= List of songs written by Lynsey de Paul =

This is a list of songs written or co-written by Lynsey de Paul.

- "A Lover Lovin' You"
- "All I Am"
- "All Night"
- "A Little TLC"
- "Beautiful"
- "Before You Go Tonight"
- "Billy"
- "Blind Leading The Blind"
- "Boomerang"
- "Brandy"
- "Bring Yourself Back To Me"
- "Call Me"
- "Central Park Arrest"
- "Certified"
- "Crossword Puzzle"
- "Dancin' (on a Saturday Night)"
- "Dedicated"
- "Do Unto Others"
- "Doctor Doctor"
- "Don't You Remember When"
- "E.O.I.O."
- "Forever And A Day"
- "Funny How Things Can Change"
- "Get Your Gun"
- "Getting a Drag"
- "Going to a Disco"
- "Happy Christmas To You From Me"
- "He Can't Dance"
- "Hearts of Gold"
- "Hi Summer"
- "Hollywood Romance"
- "Hot Shot"
- "House of Cards"
- "Hug and Squeeze Me"
- "I Gotcha Now"
- "If I Don't Get You The Next One Will"
- "If Only"
- "Instant Love"
- "Into My Music"
- "It's Been a Long Time"
- "Ivory Tower"
- "Keep Your Mouth Shut"
- "Just a Little Time"
- "Just Visiting"
- "Le Temps De Vivre"
- "Lend us a Fiver"
- "Let Your Body Go Downtown"
- "Live for Love" ("Et bonjour à toi l'artiste")
- "Losin' the Blues for You"
- "Love Bomb"
- "Mama Do"
- "Martian Man"
- "Melancholy Melon"
- "Miss Hit and Run"
- "Mona"
- "My Man and Me"
- "My One and Only (Bones song)"
- "New York Minute"
- "No, Honestly"
- "Nothing Really Lasts Forever"
- "Now and Then"
- "Nursery Rhyme"
- "On the Ride (You Do It Once, You Do It Twice)"
- "Ooh I Do"
- "Papa Do"
- "Pilger Theme"
- "Rock Bottom"
- "Rockerdile"
- "Roter Mann"
- "Sad Old Shadow"
- "School Love"
- "Side By Side"
- "So Good To You"
- "Stick to You"
- "Storm in a Teacup"
- "Strange Changes"
- "Sugar Me"
- "Sugar Shuffle"
- "Suspicion"
- "Take Back Your Heartaches"
- "Take Your Time"
- "Takin' It Easy"
- "Taking It On"
- "Talk"
- "The One Exception"
- "The Rag Trade"
- "The Thieves of Paris"
- "The Way It Goes"
- "There's No Place Like London"
- "They'd Rather Be Making Money"
- "Thunder in the Night"
- "Til You Come Back Hone"
- "Time and Place"
- "Tip of My Tongue"
- "Tigers and Fireflies"
- "Twas"
- "Water"
- "We Got Love"
- "What You Gonna Do With Your Freedom"
- "Without You"
- "When You've Gotta Go"
- "Won't Somebody Dance with Me"
- "Words Don't Mean a Thing"
- "You Give Me Those Feelings"
- "You Don't Know"
- "You Made Me Write This Song"
- "You Shouldn't Say That"
- "You've Either Got It Or You Ain't"
