= Lynsey de Paul discography =

- Studio albums: 6
- Compilation albums: 11
- Singles: 23

The discography of English singer-songwriter Lynsey de Paul consists of six studio albums, 11 compilation albums and 23 singles. Known for her top-ten hits "Sugar Me" and "No Honestly" and the Eurovision Song Contest entry "Rock Bottom" as well as her Ivor Novello Award hit "Won't Somebody Dance With Me", de Paul also wrote and/or co-wrote a number of songs that were hits for other artists, including "Storm in a Teacup" for the Fortunes and "Dancin' (on a Saturday Night)" for Barry Blue.

== Albums ==
=== Studio albums ===
Title	Album details
Surprise	Released: March 1973; Label: MAM; Formats: LP, MC, 8-track
Taste Me... Don't Waste Me	Released: November 1974; Label: Jet; Formats: LP, MC, 8-track
Love Bomb	Released: December 1975; Label: Jet; Formats: LP, MC
Tigers and Fireflies	Released: February 1979; Label: Polydor; Formats: LP, MC
Before You Go Tonight	Released: 21 November 1990; Label: Century; Formats: CD; Recorded in 1976, but not released until 1990, only in Japan
Just a Little Time	Released: 1994; Label: Music De Luxe; Formats: CD

=== Compilation albums ===
Title	Album details
Greatest Hits	Released: 1973; Label: MAM; Formats: LP, MC; Netherlands-only release
The World of Lynsey de Paul	Released: November 1975; Label: MAM; Formats: LP, MC; Reissued as Lynsey Sings
Getting a Drag – Best Collection	Released: 1976; Label: MAM; Formats: LP; Japan-only release
No Honestly	Released: October 1977; Label: Pickwick; Formats: LP
Profile	Released: 1981; Label: MAM; Formats: LP, MC; Germany-only release
The Best of Lynsey de Paul	Released: 1982; Label: HEP; Formats: LP, MC; Continental Europe-only release
Greatest Hits	Released: 1994; Label: Repertoire; Formats: CD; Germany and Japan-only release
Best of the 70's	Released: 2000; Label: Disky; Formats: CD; Netherlands-only release
Sugar and Beyond: Anthology 1972–1974	Released: 18 March 2013; Label: RPM; Formats: 2×CD
Into My Music: Anthology 1975–1979	Released: 18 March 2013; Label: RPM; Formats: 2×CD
Ten Best	Released: 14 December 2015; Label: Enterprise; Formats: digital download

== Singles ==
Title	Year	Peak chart positions										Album
Title	Year	UK	AUS	BEL (FL)	BEL (WA)	GER	IRE	NL	SWE	SWI	TUR	Album
"Sugar Me"	1972	5	4	1	2	16	—	1	4	—	9	Surprise
"Getting a Drag"	1972	18	—	—	—	46	—	—	—	—	12	Non-album singles
"All Night"	1973	56 (Note: Chart position is from the official UK "Breakers List".)	—	—	—	—	—	—	—	—	20	Non-album singles
"Won't Somebody Dance with Me"	1973	14	—	—	—	—	9	21	—	—	—	Non-album singles
"So Good to You" (Japan-only release)	1974	—	—	—	—	—	—	—	—	—	—	Non-album singles
"Ooh I Do"	1974	25	—	13	26	—	—	16	—	—	—	Non-album singles
"No Honestly"	1974	7	—	—	—	—	—	—	—	—	—	Love Bomb
"My Man and Me"	1975	40	—	—	—	—	—	—	—	—	—	Taste Me... Don't Waste Me
"Rhythm and Blue Jean Baby"	1975	—	—	—	—	—	—	—	—	—	—	Non-album single
"Dancin' (on a Saturday Night)" (Japan-only release)	1975	—	—	—	—	—	—	—	—	—	—	Taste Me... Don't Waste Me
"Hug and Squeeze Me"	1975	—	—	—	—	—	—	—	—	—	—	Love Bomb
"Sugar Shuffle" (US, Japan and Peru-only release)	1975	—	—	—	—	—	—	—	—	—	—	Love Bomb
"Happy Christmas to You from Me" (with Barry Blue)	1975	—	—	—	—	—	—	—	—	—	—	Non-album single
"Love Bomb"	1976	—	—	—	—	—	—	—	—	—	—	Love Bomb
"If I Don't Get You the Next One Will"	1976	—	—	—	—	—	—	—	—	—	—	Non-album singles
"Rock Bottom" (with Mike Moran)	1977	19	2	11	18	4	7	—	6	1	—	Non-album singles
"You Give Me Those Feelings"	1977	—	—	—	—	—	—	—	—	—	—	Non-album singles
"Hollywood Romance"	1978	—	—	—	—	—	—	—	—	—	—	Tigers and Fireflies
"Tigers and Fireflies"	1979	—	—	—	—	—	—	—	—	—	—	Tigers and Fireflies
"Strange Changes"	1981	—	—	—	—	—	—	—	—	—	—	Non-album single
"Air on a Heart String" (with Horea Crishan)	1983	—	—	—	—	—	—	—	—	—	—	Magie der Panflöte, Folge 2 (by Crishan)
"There's No Place Like London" (Lynsey & Friends)	1994	—	—	—	—	—	—	—	—	—	—	Non-album singles
"Water" (Twiggz featuring Lynsey de Paul)	2018	—	—	—	—	—	—	—	—	—	—	Non-album singles
"—" denotes releases that did not chart or were not released in that territory.

== Contributions ==
Year	Song	Artist	Album	Role
1970	N/A	The Pipkins	Gimme Dat Ding	Album artwork
1971	N/A	The Pipkins	We Want to Sing	Album artwork
1972	Sugarloaf Hill	Del Davis	N/A	Writer, Backing vocals
1973	"I Gotcha Now"	Zakatek	Non-album singles	Writer, producer, arranger
1973	"So Good to You"	Zakatek	Non-album singles	Writer, producer, arranger
1973	"Get Your Gun"	Zakatek	Non-album singles	Cowriter, producer, co-arranger
1973	"Gotta Runaway"	Zakatek	Non-album singles	Cowriter, producer, co-arranger
1974	"Alice"	Mott the Hoople	The Hoople	Backing vocals
1974	"Roll Away the Stone"	Mott the Hoople	The Hoople	Backing vocals
1974	"Rock 'n' Roll Winter (Loony's Tune)"	Wizzard	Non-album singles	Backing vocals
1974	"Roter Mann"	Zakatek	Non-album singles	Cowriter, producer, co-arranger
1976	"Don't You Remember When"	Vera Lynn	Non-album singles	Backing vocals, co-writer, producer
1976	"That Old Feeling"	Vera Lynn	Non-album singles	Producer
1976	"Because"	Lynsey de Paul	All This and World War II	De Paul guest performed the track
1977	"Hi Summer"	Carl Wayne	Non-album singles	Writer, producer
1977	"My Girl and Me"	Carl Wayne	Non-album singles	Writer, producer
1981	"All I Am"	Marti Webb	Won't Change Places	Co-writer, producer
1981	"What You Gonna Do with Your Freedom"	Marti Webb	Won't Change Places	Co-writer, producer
1983	"Air on a Heart String"	Horea Crishan	Magie der Panflöte, Folge 2	Synthesiser
1988	"Hearts of Gold"	Gold	Non-album single	Writer, producer, arranger
1988	"Sacks of Gold"	Gold	Non-album single	Writer, producer, arranger

== Hits written for other artists ==
- 1972: "Storm in a Teacup" (co-written with Ron Roker, No. 7 hit in the UK for the Fortunes)
- 1972: "On the Ride (You Do It Once, You Do It Twice)" (co-written with Ed Adamberry), No. 23 hit in the Netherlands for Continental Uptight Band
- 1972: "Crossword Puzzle" (co-written with Barry Green), No. 2 in Thailand for Dana Rosemary Scallon
- 1973: "You Do It Once, You Do It Twice" (co-written with Ed Adamberry), No. 1 hit in Malaysia for Family Robinson
- 1973: "When You've Gotta Go" (co-written with Ron Roker), No. 100 hit in Australia and No. 17 peak on the Netherlands Tipparade for Solomon King
- 1973: "Dancin' (on a Saturday Night)" (co-written with Barry Blue), No. 2 hit in the UK for Barry Blue
- 1973: "Tip of My Tongue" (co-written with Barry Blue), UK chart bubbler listing for Brotherly Love
- 1974: "Dancin' (on a Saturday Night)" (co-written with Barry Blue) No. 93 hit in the US for Flash Cadillac & the Continental Kids, No. 79 on the Cashbox Top 100
- 1974: "School Love" (co-written with Barry Blue), No. 11 hit in the UK for Barry Blue
- 1974: "Miss Hit and Run" (co-written with Barry Blue), No. 26 hit in the UK for Barry Blue
- 1974: "Hot Shot" (co-written with Barry Blue), No. 26 hit in the UK for Barry Blue
- 1974: "Central Park Arrest" written by de Paul, No. 30 hit in the UK for Thunderthighs (de Paul plays piano on this)
- 1977: "Let Your Body Go Downtown" (co-written with Mike Moran), No. 38 hit in the UK for Martyn Ford Orchestra
- 1977: "Hi Summer" written by de Paul, No. 10 hit in South Africa and No. 4 in Rhodesia, No. 141 in the UK for Carl Wayne
- 1984: "We Got Love" (co-written with Terry Britten), No. 118 UK hit for the Real Thing and No. 50 on the Music Week UK Disco and Dance chart
- 1986: "There's No Place Like London" (co-written with Gerard Kenny), No. 138 in the UK for Shirley Bassey
- 1989: "Dancin' (on a Saturday Night)" (remix version co-written with Barry Blue), No. 86 in the UK for Barry Blue
- 1996: "Martian Man" (track on "The Milkman" maxi-CD by Julianne Regan's group Mice), No. 92 in the UK
