= Eve Fights Back =

TV documentary on self-defense for women

Eve Strikes Back (a.k.a. Eve Fights Back) is a one off TV documentary on self defence for women, specially commissioned by the BBC and produced by Cat's Eye Productions Ltd. in association with Domino Films in 1992. Lynsey de Paul devised and presents the program, which provides advice to women on how to maintain their personal safety. She also demonstrates how women can defend themselves from attacks, and interviews women who have been attacked. De Paul reports that 180,000 rapes and sexual assaults are recorded each year in England and Wales, while research in the United States suggests that women can double their chances of avoiding being raped if they resist their attacker. It was first shown on BBC One on 10 August 1992 and repeated on 29 March 1993. The program won a Royal Television Society Award.

De Paul also produced a video distributed by PolyGram Video and, in 2007, an updated DVD called Taking Control that provides further instruction with de Paul and John Steadman, a ninth dan ju-jitsu black belt expert, acting out defence strategies as well de Paul presenting facts and figures. The emphasis of the video and DVD is on disabling any assailant for long enough to get away. Confrontation is always the last option, but infinitely preferable to being a passive victim, and the popular view that fighting back increases the risk of serious injury is refuted. The evidence for this was drawn from the work of Pauline Bart at the University of Chicago showing that women who screamed, shouted, resisted were at no greater risk from retaliation by their aggressors, but were more likely to successfully fend off an attacker. De Paul made numerous television appearances where she was interviewed about self defence techniques for women.

Graham Keal interviewed de Paul for the Daily Record in 2007 and she is quoted as saying "Don't address the area where he's attacking," she said. "That's might against might, and he's stronger than you. But his main weapons - his arms - are in use while yours are free to attack his vulnerable areas. If you target them quickly, you turn the control around." Keal wrote "It's a persuasive argument which looks even more convincing when you see Lynsey in action. And at a fighting weight of six-and-a-half stone, you realise that if little Lynsey can do it, anyone can". The video was released in other countries such as Spain and Germany. It was also featured in the official magazine of the British Jujitsu Association and the United Kingdom Taekwando Association Fighters: The Martial Arts Magazine.

Lord Mackenzie (Brian Mackenzie, Baron Mackenzie of Framwellgate), former president of the Police Superintendents' Association endorsed the self-defence advice presented by de Paul, saying: "It is a very positive contribution to crime prevention and the protection of women and I will be recommending it."

A book, authored by de Paul and TV producer Claire McCormack, was also published in 1993 entitled "Taking Control: Basic Mental & Physical Self Defence for Women" to underscore the lessons presented in Eve Strikes Back and Taking Control. De Paul also toured schools and universities in order to encourage them to get the self defence techniques included in their curricula.

The theme music and sound track to this video was written by de Paul and Ian Lynn, with de Paul providing the vocals. The style of the music is more in the vein of her album, Just a Little Time, that was released two years later.
