= Sugar and Beyond =

2013 double compilation album by Lynsey de Paul

Compilation album by Lynsey de Paul
- Released: March 18, 2013

Lynsey de Paul chronology
Just a Little Time (1994)	Sugar and Beyond (2013)	Into My Music (2013)

Sugar and Beyond is a double compilation album by the British singer-songwriter Lynsey de Paul released on 18 March 2013, together with a second double album, Into My Music. De Paul personally oversaw the project and was involved in the digital remastering of the tracks from the original tapes. The CD includes all her hits as well as the two LPs released in the period between 1972 and 1974.

== Overview ==
The majority of the tracks on this CD had not been reissued previously. The first CD (and the first four tracks on the second CD) contained all of the recordings for MAM Records (the four singles with A-sides and B sides) as well as tracks from the Surprise album. The version of "Sugar Me" included is the longer album version produced by de Paul, rather than the single version which was produced by Gordon Mills. Similarly, the version of "All Night" is longer than the single version originally released in 1973 and it includes an extra section that reprises "Baby sugar me" from her first hit. Sugar and Beyond also contains two unreleased songs performed by de Paul from 1972 and orchestrated by Nick Drake collaborator, Robert Kirby - "House of Cards" (a song covered by many artists) and "Taking It On", a song co-written with Ron Roker and previously released by Sacha Distel and Petula Clark, as well as dance troupe The Young Generation on their 1973 album, Give Me Love.

The second CD includes the one off international hit single on the Warner Bros label "Ooh I Do" and its B-side "Nothing Really Lasts Forever", and subsequent releases on the Jet Records/Polydor Records label such as the UK top 40 hit "My Man and Me" plus de Paul's version of "Dancin' (on a Saturday Night)" (the B-side to that single) and it concludes with de Paul's second biggest hit single "No, Honestly" and the B-side of this single "Central Park Arrest", which was a UK hit for Thunderthighs. The remaining tracks come from de Paul's second vinyl album Taste Me... Don't Waste Me. All of the songs of the album were either written or co-written by de Paul. The album came with a booklet with photographs and memorabilia from de Paul's personal archive, as well her as anecdotes about the songs and her career.

The album received positive reviews in the music press such as the UK music magazines Record Collector and Music Week, plus the US music magazine Goldmine, with one review stating "it paints the portrait of an artist whose songs stand apart from the rest, her lyrics show her as a very good lyricist and the songs span everything from piano ballads to pop, rock and even some early 70s disco tinged material". The CD was the 37th best selling album on the label in the first quarter after its release It was also listed as one of the best albums of 2013 by Dave Bash of International Pop Overthrow
