= Lord Mackenzie =

Lord Mackenzie may refer to:

- Brian Mackenzie, Baron Mackenzie of Framwellgate, member of the House of Lords
- Donald Mackenzie (advocate) (1818–1875), Scottish judge, styled Lord Mackenzie
- Earl of Seaforth, a title of the Mackenzie family in the seventeenth and eighteenth centuries
- Kenneth Mackenzie, 1st Lord Mackenzie of Kintail (died 1611), Highland clan chief
- Hector MacKenzie, Baron MacKenzie of Culkein (born 1940), Scottish nurse and former trade union official
- Lord Muir Mackenzie
