= Rebekah Fitch =

- Born: 1 December 1995 (age 30); Belfast, Northern Ireland
- Genre: Alternative pop
- Occupations: Singer-songwriter, musician
- Instruments: Vocals, piano, flute
- Years active: 2016–present
- Website: rebekahfitch.com

Rebekah Fitch (born 1 December 1995) is a Northern Irish singer-songwriter and musician, born and raised in Belfast, Northern Ireland. She released her debut EP, Broken Mind, in 2018, with a follow-up EP, Lies We Tell Ourselves, in 2019. She was a runner-up in the PRS Lynsey de Paul Prize in 2018.

== Personal life ==
Fitch is a Christian. In a 2017 interview she spoke about how, having grown up in a Christian family, her faith became fully her own whilst at University.

== Discography ==
=== Extended plays ===
Title	Details
Broken Mind	Release date: 23 February 2018; Label: Self-release; Formats: CD, digital download, online streaming
Lies We Tell Ourselves	Release date: 12 April 2019; Label: Self-release; Formats: CD, digital download, online streaming

=== Singles ===
Year	Title
2016	"Stroke of Genius"
2016	"Here We Go"
2016	"Afraid of the Light"
2016	"Hosanna"
2017	"Another Show"
2018	"A Love So Crazy
2018	"Fake Smiles"
2018	"Not Myself"
2018	"Human Condition(ing)"
2018	"Need to Feel"
2019	"Poison"
2019	"Guns With Guns"
2019	"Need to Feel"
2019	"Enigma"
2020	"Dust"
2020	"Game Over"
2021	"Loose Ends"
2021	"Goodbye"
2022	"No Pressure"
2022	"Ready Now"
