= We Got Love (Real Thing) =

Single by The Real Thing
- Released: October 1984
- Genre: Dance; soul; pop
- Label: RCA
- Songwriters: Lynsey de Paul; Terry Britten
- Producer: Nick Martinelli

The Real Thing singles chronology
"Street Corner Boogie" (1983)	"We Got Love" (1984)	"Street Scene" (1984)

"We Got Love" is a song written by Lynsey de Paul and Terry Britten that was first recorded by British soul group, The Real Thing. It was produced by the American R&B and pop record producer, Nick Martinelli, and released on the RCA label, both as a 7-inch single, and a 12-inch extended play version, in October 1984.

== Content ==
The lyrics of the song discuss love being more important than riches and wealth, and fame being meaningless.

== Reception ==
It received positive reviews from the mainstream music press. Music Week described the song (and their debut on the RCA label) as "another veteran (and home-grown) dancefloor mak[ing] a welcome reappearance in the shape of Real Thing with We Got Love... produced in Philadelphia by the ubiquitous Nick Martinelli,... [it] could well be a step back towards their old consistency for the scouse soulsters." On his weekly disco page for Record Mirror, James Hamilton wrote the following: "[the] Latest to benefit from a visit to Nick Martinelli in Philadelphia, the guys sound quite soulful... hoarsely harmonizing in unison to a nagging 103bpm beat (the tempo makes it) with nice scat break". It was already play listed on at least 10 of the UK's most prominent radio stations by late October and was made record of the week by two U.K. radio stations as well as being played on Italian radio.

=== Charts ===
The song entered the top 200 of the UK Singles Chart as compiled by Gallup on 13 October 1984 and spent six weeks on the chart peaking at number 118. The song also was a hit on the dance floor, with a three week stretch on the Record Mirror Disco Chart where it peaked at number 58, and debuted in the top 50 of the Music Week "Top Disco & Dance Songs" chart for the week including November 4, 1984, receiving playlisting by 15 radio stations. The song also charted at number 34 on the DJ Nightclub chart.

== Releases ==
The first release of the song on CD was in two different mixes ("We Got Love (dub mix))" and "We Got Love (12 inch extended version)) since both were included on the seven CD The Anthology 1972-1997, on Cherry Red Records released in 2021.

=== Compilation albums ===
"We Got Love" was also included as a track on some compilation albums, including the 1985 various artist funk/soul album Black Magic. It was also included on the Indonesian album No.1 Prambors Of The Year, released on the Team Record label as a music cassette. The extended mix was also one of the songs included in House Mixes by Italian DJ Michele Mobydick..

=== Just a Little Time ===
The song's co-writer, de Paul, released her recording of the song on her 1994 album Just a Little Time, and it is available on the album Pop Masters: Sugar Me 2005 on Spotify. According to another interview with de Paul, the song was allegedly also recorded by fellow British soul group Imagination, but this needs verification.

== Weekly charts ==
Weekly chart performance for "We Got Love (Real Thing)"
Chart (1984)	Peak position
UK Singles (OCC)	118
