= 1986 RTHK Top 10 Gold Songs Awards =

Hong Kong music awards ceremony

The 1986 RTHK Top 10 Gold Songs Awards (Chinese: 1986年度十大中文金曲得獎) was held in 1986 for the 1985 music season.

== Top 10 song awards ==
The top 10 songs (十大中文金曲) of 1986 are as follows.

Song name in Chinese	Artist	Composer	Lyricist
幾許風雨	Roman Tam	Yat ming (佚名)	Siu mei (小美)
凝望	Danny Chan	Danny Chan	Zeng Gwok-gong (鄭國江)
愛將	Anita Mui	-	Pun Wai-yun (潘偉源)
心思思	Samuel Hui	Terry Britten Lynsey de Paul	Richard Lam
無言感激	Alan Tam	神林早人 Sam Zaak-dak (深澤德)	Siu mei (小美)
朋友	Alan Tam	Hiroaki Serizawa (芹澤廣明)	Hoeng Syut-waai (向雪懷)
月半彎	Jacky Cheung	Kōji Tamaki	Kat Lung (卡龍)
海上花	Jenny Tseng	Lo Ta-yu	Lo Ta-yu
阿Lam日記	George Lam	-	George Lam
當年情	Leslie Cheung	Joseph Koo	Wong Jim

== Other awards ==
Award	Song or album (if available)	Recipient
Best new prospect award (最有前途新人獎)	-	(gold) Taiji (太極) (silver) Tat Ming Pair (bronze) Alvin Kwok (郭小霖)
Best record producer award (最佳唱片監製獎)	最愛	George Lam
Best musical arrangements (最佳編曲獎)	千個太陽	Lou dik (羅迪)
Best record design award (最佳唱片封套設計獎)	葉德嫻千個太陽	Tina Lau (劉天蘭)
Most creative song award 最有創意歌曲獎	歌詞	Pun Gwong-pui (潘光沛)
Best C-pop song award (最佳中文流行歌曲獎)	最愛是誰	Lowell Lo
Best C-pop lyrics award (最佳中文流行歌詞獎)	幾許風雨	Siu mei (小美)
Best performance award (最受歡迎演出中文歌曲獎)	愛情陷阱	Alan Tam
IFBI award (IFBI 大獎)	-	Alan Tam
RTHK Golden needle award (金針獎)	-	Tang Ti-sheng
