= Taste Me... Don't Waste Me =

Taste Me...Don't Waste Me

Studio album by Lynsey de Paul
- Released: November 1974
- Genre: R&B
- Length: 43:53
- Label: Jet
- Producer: Lynsey de Paul

Lynsey de Paul chronology
| The World of Lynsey de Paul (1973) | Taste Me...Don't Waste Me (1974) | Love Bomb (1975) |

Taste Me...Don't Waste Me is the third album by the English singer-songwriter Lynsey de Paul but the second album of completely new material (following Surprise and the compilation album The World of...) and de Paul also was the producer for all of the songs. It was released in the UK in November 1974 and was the first album on Don Arden's then new label, Jet Records, and initially distributed by Polydor, although Island Records was soon contracted by Arden to take over distribution and this confusion may have negatively affected sales. Releases in all other countries, such as Spain, Germany, Australia, Japan and South America, were on the Polydor label in early 1975. The album was generally well received by music critics from leading magazines of the day. AllMusic journalist Craig Harris stated that "one of the first successful female singer-songwriters in England, de Paul has had an illustrious career" and lists this as one of her best albums. The Sunday Sun reviewed the album and wrote "Lynsey de Paul has shown her fine smoochy new album "Taste Me Don’t Waste Me" that she consistent song-writing talent". It was also de Paul's personal favourite album and she wrote on her music store website some years later "The Taste Me... Don't Waste Me album was a romantic collection of songs that I wrote and recorded as a relaxing, late night album", echoing earlier comments to the music press. The LP was listed as one of the best album releases of 1975 by journalist Judith Simons. It has stood the test of time in that it is listed as one of the top albums released in 1974 by online site "Best ever albums", as well as one of the top 1000 albums released in the 1970s.

The album featured key session musician's such as the drummer Terry Cox, guitarist Chris Rae, bass guitarist Dave Markee, percussionist John Dean, with string arrangements by Gerry Shury, Christopher Gunning and also the Benny Goodman Trio. The sleeve notes gave "special thanks to Don Arden and the Gang". The album was released for the first time on CD in Japan in 1999 and it is listed as one of the most popular all time albums in a Japanese poll. Notable tracks include "My Man and Me", a top 40 hit for de Paul and her version of "Dancin' (on a Saturday Night)", which had previously been an international hit for her co-writer, Barry Blue. "My Man and Me" was covered in 2013 by Japanese singer "Beautiful Hummingbird" as a track on her self titled album. Other notable songs on the album included "Rainbow" which was co-written by de Paul and Allan Clarke who was the lead singer with The Hollies. Even though "Rainbow" was not released as a single, the song made the Poporama radio chart in Sweden and garnered much radio play in Italy throughout 1975. Another standout track was the ballad "When I'm Alone With You" which was performed on live on radio and TV as well as singing the song as a duet with Jack Jones on his BBC2 show broadcast 3rd February 1974.

De Paul launched the Taste Me... Don't Waste Me album at an event at The Dorchester hotel, London, on 28 November 1974. She performed many of the songs from this album as a special guest on each episode of the TV show Cooper, hosted by comic Tommy Cooper and these live versions are now available on DVD. De Paul appeared on The Old Grey Whistle Test on 31 January 1975, where she performed live versions of "Let's Boogie" and "My Man and Me" to promote the album. The performances of these songs was also featured in the BBC Four series, Singer-songwriters at the BBC, originally broadcast in 2010. De Paul also performed a series of live dates in concert halls around the UK, as well as her own prime time TV special In Concert in March 1975 to promote the album. She also found time that month to appear on the Morecambe and Wise Radio Show to perform "Let's Boogie".

== Cover versions songs on the album ==
Swedish singer Agnetha Munther (aka Agneta Munther) covered the songs "Taste Me" ("Låt dina sinnen få smaka") and "My Man and Me" ("Min man och jag"), but with Swedish lyrics by Britt Lindeborg on her 1975 album Två Sidor (Two Pages). Italian singer Mia Martini recorded a version of the song ("Sabato") with Italian lyrics on her 1975 album Un Altro Giorno Con Me, and this reached #54 on the Italian albums chart. She performed the song on the TV program Speciale Midem (1975). The album was released for the first time on CD in 1999. The punk rock song "Bata Hotel" by Crass that appeared on their album Penis Envy, directly lifts the lyrics "Use me don't lose me, Taste me, don't waste me" from de Paul's album title track. The song "Heard It All B4" by Luke Vibert on the 2017 release "Luke Vibert Presents UK Garave Vol. 1" samples de Paul's vocals from "Lying Again" ("Don't say a word, I heard it all before") and received positive reviews.

== CD releases ==
The song "Ooh I Do" was originally released as a stand-alone single in 1974 on the Warner Bros label and was a hit on the singles charts in the UK, Belgium, Sweden and the Netherlands, but it was not included on the original release of Taste Me... Don't Waste Me. However, "Ooh I Do" was included as a track on the later CD release of the album.

All of the songs from the album were remastered and issued on de Paul's 2013 Sugar and Beyond double CD release.

== Track listing ==
1. "My Man and Me" (Lynsey de Paul) 3:59 (UK #40)
2. "Moonrise" (Lynsey de Paul, Barry Blue) 4:00
3. "Taste Me" (Lynsey de Paul) 3:56
4. "Let's Boogie" (Lynsey de Paul) 3:32
5. "Dancin' (on a Saturday Night)" (Lynsey de Paul, Barry Blue) 4:01
6. "Lying Again" (Lynsey de Paul) 4:13
7. "If Only" (Lynsey de Paul, Barry Blue) 4:11
8. "Rainbow" (Lynsey de Paul, Allan Clarke) 4:23
9. "Nursery Rhyme" (Lynsey de Paul, Barry Blue) 4:21
10. "When I'm Alone With You" (Lynsey de Paul) 3:53
11. "Ooh I Do" (Lynsey de Paul, Barry Blue) 3:24 (Not on LP JET LP 07)

== Personnel ==
- Lynsey de Paul: Vocals, keyboards
- Chris Rae: Guitars
- Dave Markee: Electric and acoustic bass
- Terry Cox: Drums, percussion
- John Dean: Percussion
- String arrangements – Gerry Shury (tracks 9 & 10), "Benny Goodman Trio" (tracks 4 & 8), Chris Gunning (tracks 1, 2, 3, 5 & 6)

== Production ==
- Produced by Lynsey de Paul
- Engineered by Geoff Calver
- Art direction by Michael Doud (AGI)
- Photography by John Thornton
