= Surprise (Lynsey de Paul album) =

Studio album by Lynsey de Paul
- Released: March 1973
- Studios: Air Studio, Oxford Street, London; Audio International Studios, London W1
- Label: MAM
- Producer: Lynsey de Paul

Lynsey de Paul chronology
Surprise (1973)	The World of Lynsey de Paul (1973)

Surprise is the first album released by Lynsey de Paul on the MAM record label in 1973. In Australia, the album name was changed to Sugar Me, after de Paul's first hit single. All of the songs on the album were written or co-written by de Paul (half the tracks were re-recordings of her songwriting demos).

== Production ==
On the album, de Paul was accompanied by some of the UK's leading session musicians including Terry Cox, Ralph McTell, Ray Cooper, Jeff Daly, John Gustafson, Chris Rae, Danny Thompson, Gary Boyle, Barry de Souza, Dick Katz, Robert Kirby, Francis Monkman, John Richardson (who would later become the drummer in The Rubettes) and violinist Johnny Van Derrick.

Her debut single "Sugar Me" was re-recorded for this album and has a much longer fade out with de Paul being the producer on this version rather than Gordon Mills, who produced the hit single version.

== Release and promotion ==
Although no other tracks were released by de Paul from the album as singles in the UK, Europe and US, the track "Water" was released as "Agua" in Chile and Peru, with "Rockerdile" as the B-side. The single reached number 16 on the Peru "Mas Temas" ranking. The album's last track "Just Visiting" sees de Paul speculate that spacemen visited prehistoric man and gave continued guidance in mankind's development and that we might find ourselves in the same position, a theme taken up by Chris de Burgh in his later song "A Spaceman Came Travelling". One review in the mainstream press stated "De Paul manages to write a very good song on "Was God an astronaut?"". "Just Visiting" was included on the French duo Pilooski & Pentile's (aka Discodeine) guest mix released to promote their album Swimmer (2013).

The album front cover is a portrait photo of de Paul photographed by Clive Arrowsmith, and a gatefold sleeve with illustrations provided by de Paul, a nod to her previous career of designing album sleeves and song lyrics.

De Paul performed live versions of some of the tracks from the album on television including Top of the Pops (and an album was released to BBC radio stations around the world containing these tracks), as well as on the first episode of the German TV program, Musikladen performing "Sugar Me", and later on episode 5 performing "Doctor, Doctor". She also performed "Sleeping Blue Nights" on the German TV program Hits-a-Go-Go on 24 June 1973. Other promotional work included a lengthy interview with de Paul, as well as airplay of featured album tracks on Japanese radio (Nippon Viva Turtle Show).

== Cover versions of songs on Surprise ==
Many of the tracks on Surprise were also recorded by other artists. The jazz tinged "Mama Do" was covered by a number of artists with slightly different lyrics and with the title "Papa Do", notably by the song's co-writer, Barry Green. This version reached number 68 on the French singles chart. It was also released as a single by Greek group, The Daltons, and also as an album track by the Dutch-based Italian group Cardinal Point.

"Ivory Tower" (co-written with Elizabeth Sacks in 1971) was released as a single by singer-songwriter Caroline Hall in 1973 and it was also recorded as an album track on the self titled John Leyton album in 1973. "Crossword Puzzle" was recorded and released as a single by Dana and Dana performed the song on Top of the Pops and also on Saturday Variety, a prime time BBC1 series on 8 July 1972. This version of the song reached number 2 on the Bangkok singles chart in September 1972, spending a total of 5 weeks on the chart, as reported in Billboard. "Sleeping Blue Nights" was recorded and released by Zig-Zag on the Magnet Record label (catalog Nr. MAG 17) with favourable reviews and this was listed as a U.K. chart breaker for 4 months at the end of 1974/beginning of 1975. In an interview with Melody Maker about the Surprise album, de Paul revealed that White Plains recorded a version of "The Way It Goes", the song she co-wrote with Malcolm Roberts.

Japanese artist Nickey recorded a version of "Water", which was the last track on her 2013 album A Taste on Honey. Smoove & Turrell borrowed from the backing track to "Water" on their single "You Don't Know" and its various remixes in 2009, with permission from de Paul, who also received a writing credit for the song.

== CD releases of Surprise ==
In 2005, the album was released on CD for the first time in Japan on the AIRAC label, and featured the following additional bonus tracks on a second CD: "Storm in a Teacup", "Getting a Drag", "Brandy", "All Night", "Blind Leading the Blind", "Won't Somebody Dance with Me", and "So Good To You" i.e. all four hit singles and B-sides recorded for the MAM Records label.

== Critically acclaimed ==
On its release, the album received favourable reviews from the mainstream music press with adverts proclaiming "the first album from this enormously talented artist" being placed in most of them. Gramophone stated "she has a neatly effective knack of songwriting and puts the numbers across in a competent manner." The Sunday Herald wrote "...her first album, Surprise, demonstrated a ready facility for melody and catchy hooks, but also a knack for sidestepping the most predictable pop clichés." Record Mirror stated "Surprise for many. They said she was a Top 50 single maker. Album with many goodies. Not a dull track. Sexy as well". The album also received positive reviews from the U.K. press.

German music book, Rock Musiker, considered Surprise to be one of the best albums of 1973, and placed as the 9th best album of 1973 by Rock Candy Magazine. The album was also listed by Rock Compact Disc magazine (as Lynsey Sings) as one of the 50 Glam Era Highlights of 1972-1974. It was featured as one of the choices for best albums for Record Store Day by the Italian newspaper la Repubblica in 2011. The Guardian described Surprise as "a gem, pitched somewhere between the English baroque found on high-priced rarities like Mandy More's "But That Is Me" and the singer-songwriter slot on That's Life".

== Track listing ==
All tracks are composed by Lynsey de Paul; except where indicated

A side

1. "Mama Do" (de Paul, Barry Ian Green)
2. "Ivory Tower" (de Paul, Liz Sacks)
3. "Doctor Doctor"
4. "Crossword Puzzle" (de Paul, Barry Ian Green)
5. "Water" (de Paul, Barry Ian Green)

B side

1. "Sleeping Blue Nights" (de Paul, Barry Ian Green)
2. "The Way It Goes" (de Paul, Malcolm Roberts)
3. "Rockerdile" (de Paul, Barry Ian Green)
4. "Sugar Me" (de Paul, Barry Ian Green)
5. "Just Visiting"

== Personnel ==
- Lynsey de Paul - vocals, piano
- Gary Boyle, Chris Ray - electric guitar
- Ralph McTell - acoustic guitar on "Ivory Tower"
- Johnny Gustafson, Frank McDonald - bass
- Danny Thompson - string bass on "Ivory Tower"
- Peter Robinson - electric piano, organ
- Dave Grounds - electric piano
- Dick Katz - additional piano on "Water"
- Francis Monkman - harpsichord on "Ivory Tower"
- Robert Kirby - string arrangement on "Ivory Tower"
- Terry Cox, Barry de Souza, John Richardson - drums, percussion
- Ray Cooper, Frank Ricotti, Morris Pert - percussion
- Jeff Daly - saxophone, flute, brass
- Alan Skidmore, Henry Lowther, Geoff Wright, Mike Bailey - brass
- Johnny Van Derrek - violin on "Sugar Me"

Technical

- Peter Coleman - production engineer
- Lynsey de Paul - album design
- Clive Arrowsmith - cover photography
