= Taking It On =

"Taking It On" is a song written by Lynsey de Paul and Ron Roker, and originally published by ATV Music. Although de Paul recorded her own demo version of the song in 1972, her version of the song was not released until 2013 on her Anthology CD album Sugar and Beyond. De Paul also arranged and produced this recording.

The song was given it first official release by the popular dancing ensemble The Young Generation, together with another De Paul/Roker composition "It's Been a Long Time", on their album Give Me Love, named after the George Harrison song "Give Me Love (Give Me Peace on Earth)" that the Young Generation also cover on the album. It was released in 1973 on the RCA Victor label and promotion included an advert listing "Takin It On" as a track on the album. The song was also a track on the 1974 German release of a double album of the same name, but which included their other 1973 album "They Sold A Million" and had a gatefold sleeve. The Young Generation were a dancing and singing group, created specifically for BBC Television in the late 1960s but also popular in their own right on German television shows such as Star Parade, a West German music television programme, which was shown on ZDF.

"Taking It On" was also performed and recorded as a duet by French vocalist and songwriter Sacha Distel and Petula Clark in October 1973, produced by Wayne Bickerton and mastered by Denis Blackham. It was released on the flip side of the duo's single "(Let The Love Light In Your Eyes) Lead Me On" on the Polydor label. As well as being a single release, these two tracks, together with the song "Pretty Cherries", were destined for an album featuring a series of duets by Clark and Distel for the Polydor label that has yet to be released. "Songs Through Time" gave a glowing appraisal of the song and the singers, writing "a stunning single, calm and as reassuring as the message within the lyrics. Backing the two brilliant, famous singers in their own right are various instruments bringing out the gentle, and more powerful moments of ‘Taking It On’; soft piano, plucked guitar chords, strings, bass, some cool electric guitar noodling, and drums which come in during the bigger moments of the song. Both Clark and Distel get to show off their very different vocals; Clark with the clear voice of a global entertainer voice, and Distel with his deep, affected French voice. ‘Taking it On’ is a positive song about a couple who are determined to make their lives better, to help each-other through difficult times by providing comfort and guidance. It's suggested their lives aren't currently great, but their response is to strive to brighten them; a response of positive action. It's a beautifully-written song courtesy of ‘Sugar Me’ singer-songwriter Lynsey De Paul, and another great duet between two successful singers".
