= Hi Summer (song) =

Single by Lynsey de Paul

"Hi Summer" is a song written by Lynsey de Paul and recorded by Carl Wayne as a single released on the DJM/Weekend label on 5 August 1977, although curiously, the release of the single was announced in The Stage on 17 September 1977 The B-side of the single is another song composed by de Paul, "My Girl and Me". Both songs were produced by de Paul with "Hi Summer" being published by Standard Music. It was used as the theme tune to the popular Sunday night prime time ITV variety programme Hi Summer which also featured Carl Wayne as one of the performers. The song received good reviews, with notable British DJ and music critic James Hamilton writing "Ultra-brite and bouncy TV theme really does get ‘em jiving" for his weekly disco music feature in Record Mirror. That issue of Record Mirror also contained a half page advert for the single. Music Week also featured a full-page advert for the single. College DJ Andy Davids promoted an uptempo television theme playlist at the time, that included "Hi Summer" along with the theme tunes from Happy Days by Pratt & McClain as well as The Muppet Show.

== Chart performance ==
The single reached number 141 on the UK Singles Chart in August 1977 and by the year end had sold almost 12,000 copies. The lowly chart place was in part due to lack of BBC radio play (though it was play listed by Thames Valley radio). Nevertheless, it performed better in other countries, notably peaking at number 4 on the official Rhodesian singles chart, having been released on the Gallo label and made number 10 in the South African chart, having been released on DJM Records. The song is also mentioned in the book La saga de Roy Wood Brumbeat forever by Vincent Lasserre, as is "My Girl and Me". It is listed as the 569th best selling single of 1977 in the UK, with 11,611 copies being sold.

Later, the song was also used to advertise ITV's weekly magazine TVTimes and its affiliated regional commercial television channels,. "Hi Summer" was also included as an album track on the 1977 compilation album, T.V. Themes, released on the DJM/Weekend Records label. It receives occasional radio airplay in the U.S.
