= The Big Sleep (1978 film) =

1978 film by Michael Winner

- Theatrical release poster
- Directed by: Michael Winner
- Screenplay by: Michael Winner
- Based on: The Big Sleep; 1939 novel by Raymond Chandler
- Produced by: Jerry Bick; Lew Grade; Elliott Kastner; Bernard Williams; Michael Winner
- Starring: Robert Mitchum; Sarah Miles; Richard Boone; Candy Clark; Joan Collins; Edward Fox; John Mills; James Stewart; Oliver Reed
- Narrated by: Robert Mitchum
- Cinematography: Robert Paynter
- Edited by: Frederick Wilson
- Music by: Jerry Fielding
- Production company: ITC Entertainment
- Distributed by: United Artists
- Release date: 13 March 1978
- Running time: 99 minutes
- Countries: United Kingdom; United States
- Language: English

The Big Sleep is a 1978 neo-noir film, the second film version of Raymond Chandler's 1939 novel. The picture was directed by Michael Winner and stars Robert Mitchum in his second film portrayal of the detective Philip Marlowe (following Farewell, My Lovely three years earlier). The cast includes Sarah Miles, Candy Clark, Joan Collins and Oliver Reed, and features James Stewart as General Sternwood.

The story's setting was changed from 1940s Los Angeles to 1970s London. The film contains material more explicit than what could only be hinted at in the 1946 version, such as drug addiction, homosexuality, pornography and nudity. Mitchum was age 60 at the time of filming, far older than Chandler's 33-year-old Marlowe (or the 1946 film's 38-year-old Marlowe, played by Humphrey Bogart, who was 45 at the time).

== Plot ==
In 1970s England, private detective Philip Marlowe is asked to the stately home of General Sternwood, who hires Marlowe to learn who is blackmailing him. While at the mansion, he meets the general's spoiled and inquisitive daughter, Charlotte, and wild younger daughter, Camilla.

Marlowe's investigation of the homosexual pornographer, Arthur Geiger, leads him to Agnes Lozelle, an employee of Geiger, and to Joe Brody, a man with whom Agnes has become enamored. He also discovers Camilla at the scene of Geiger's murder, where she has posed for nude photographs, and safely takes her home to a grateful Charlotte.

Returning to the crime scene, Marlowe is interrupted by gambler Eddie Mars, who owns the house where Geiger's body was found. Mars's wife, Mona Grant, has not been seen in a while, and may have run off with Rusty Regan, Charlotte's missing husband. Due to Charlotte Regan's gambling debts, Mars appears to have a hold over Charlotte as well.

Camilla tries to get her pictures back from Brody, who is now in possession of them. Marlowe intervenes, but Brody is shot and killed by an unknown killer. A man named Harry Jones comes to Marlowe with a proposition. He is working with Agnes now, and she is willing to sell information regarding Mona's whereabouts. However, on the night when Marlowe shows up for their meeting, Harry is poisoned by Lash Canino, a hit man working for Eddie Mars.

Marlowe pays Agnes for the address. He tracks down Canino at a remote garage, where he is overpowered and taken prisoner. Mars's supposedly missing wife, Mona, is there as well. At a moment when Canino is out, Marlowe persuades her to set him free. In a shootout, he kills Canino.

Camilla appears to be grateful to Marlowe, and asks him to teach her how to use the gun, so that she can protect herself. He takes her to some woods, and sets up an empty can on the ruins of a Roman castle for her to use as a target. She points the gun at him and pulls the trigger repeatedly, but Marlowe was prepared for this, and had given her a gun loaded with blanks. She becomes hysterical at the ruse, and he takes her home. It turns out that the emotionally disturbed Camilla had murdered her sister's husband, Rusty, and that Charlotte had covered everything up with Eddie Mars's help.

After confronting Charlotte with the facts, Marlowe tells her to have Camilla hospitalized. He drives out of the Sternwood residence the same way he came in, hoping that the gravely ill general will never know the complete truth.

== Cast ==
- Robert Mitchum as Philip Marlowe
- Sarah Miles as Charlotte Sternwood Regan
- Richard Boone as Lash Canino
- Candy Clark as Camilla Sternwood
- Joan Collins as Agnes Lozelle
- Edward Fox as Joe Brody
- John Mills as Inspector Jim Carson
- James Stewart as General Sternwood
- Oliver Reed as Eddie Mars
- Harry Andrews as Norris
- Colin Blakely as Harry Jones
- Richard Todd as Commander Barker
- Diana Quick as Mona Grant
- James Donald as Inspector Gregory
- John Justin as Arthur Geiger
- Simon Fisher Turner as Karl Lundgren
- Martin Potter as Owen Taylor

== Production ==
The film was originally developed for United Artists, for when that studio bought the Warner Bros. library, they obtained the remake rights. It went to The Rank Organisation before eventually finding finance via Lew Grade. Michael Winner said that an American was meant to adapt it but he did not agree with changing the locale to Britain, so Winner did it first. "I've changed the storyline far less than in the Hawks film," said Winner. Diana Quick performs the song "Won't Somebody Dance with Me", a ballad composed by Lynsey de Paul.

According to director Michael Winner, during the big shootout at the end of the film involving Richard Boone and Robert Mitchum, both actors were drunk on the set. The resulting filming was marred by random firings of guns and shooting in the wrong direction. Winner said it was a miracle that they got enough footage they could use and make it work.

== Critical response ==
Roger Ebert of the Chicago Sun-Times gave the film 2.5 stars out of 4, and wrote that "despite all the great costumes and sets and London locations they’re given to work with, the actors don’t seem engaged". Janet Maslin of The New York Times described the film as "senselessly gaudy" and "overloaded with big names, and in this case the net effect of an all-star cast is to make an already confusing mystery even harder to follow". Gene Siskel of the Chicago Tribune gave the film 1.5 stars out of 4, and wrote, "All of the zigs and zags of the original story are in the remake; what's missing is the enthusiasm. Talented actors such as Edward Fox and Oliver Reed sleepwalk through their parts." Kevin Thomas of the Los Angeles Times panned the film as "a flat, routine procedural detective mystery utterly devoid of any film noir atmosphere".

Arthur D. Murphy of Variety wrote, "The production is handsome, but in the updating and relocation a lot has been lost." Gary Arnold of The Washington Post wrote, "Everything is out of whack in this transposition of Chandler's material. The actors seem to be going through the motions, but they look wrong, sound wrong and inhabit the wrong settings." John Pym of The Monthly Film Bulletin wrote that the location and time change had "destroyed the crucial geographical and temporal context of Chandler's novel; almost every aspect of the narrative now seems ludicrously out of place". He added that Winner "ploughs step by step through the complicated plot with a curious lack of interest in, among other things, the nature of his hero's character".

== Home media ==
The Big Sleep has been released twice on DVD: by Artisan Home Video (now Lionsgate), under license from Carlton Media (successor in interest to ITC Entertainment) on 23 April 2002 in a Region 1 full-screen format and by Shout Factory, under license from ITV Studios (successor in interest to ITC Entertainment and Carlton Media), 23 September 2014 in a Region 1 wide-screen format.

The Big Sleep was released on Blu-ray by Shout Factory 20 February 2018, as part of a two-movie package, with the remake of Farewell, My Lovely. Both the 1946 version (featuring Humphrey Bogart) and this version have been released on Blu-ray.
