= Police Superintendents' Association =

Mandatory union alternative for senior police officers

Agency overview
- Formed: 1952
- Employees: 8
- Legal personality: Professional association

Operational structure
- Headquarters: Pangbourne, Berkshire

Website
- http://www.policesupers.com

The Police Superintendents’ Association is the sole representative body for police officers in the ranks of superintendent and chief superintendent in England and Wales. Its members are the senior operational leaders in policing in the 43 Home Office forces, British Transport Police, Civil Nuclear Constabulary, Isle of Man Constabulary, the Bermuda Police Service, Royal Gibraltar Police and the Gibraltar Defence Police. The association's headquarters are in Pangbourne, Berkshire.

== National officers ==
The Association has three full-time national officers. Its acting president is Superintendent Nick Smart following the retirement of Chief Superintendent Paul Fotheringham. A president and vice president will be elected for three-year terms in January 2024. Chief Superintendent Dan Murphy is the national secretary (appointed 2017). Under association rules, the president holds office for up to three years.

== History ==
The 1919 Police Act created a Police Federation of England and Wales to represent officers below the rank of superintendent, but no formal provision was made for superintendents. In 1920 the Home Office called a conference of superintendents, one from each force, or two from those with more than twelve superintendents, to decide how they should be represented on the Police Council. The delegates decided to elect one county and one city or borough superintendent to the Police Council and a committee of eight was formed to communicate with the Home Secretary. This was the beginning of the present Superintendents’ Association.

The Police Council met for the first time on 6 July 1920 and formulated Police Regulations to provide national conditions of service, discipline and allowances for officers. The following year, the Home Secretary approved the establishment of four permanent District conferences for superintendents, with each force sending one representative, or two from larger forces. They were permitted to convene twice every year, at public expense.

In 1952, a committee chaired by Lord Oaksey published a report that contained recommendations on police pay and conditions of service. This led to the formation of the Police Superintendents’ Association of England and Wales and also included the Metropolitan Police Service in London and the City of London Police, both of which had been outside the previous arrangements

The association is the sole representative body for superintendents and chief superintendents and has represented its members through a series of reforms including most notably the Willink Commission (1960), the Edmund-Davies Inquiry (1977), the Sheehy Inquiry (1992), the Winsor Review (2010) and the Hutton pension reforms (2010).

As the association grew in strength and influence over the years, the Home Office agreed to fund a chief superintendent to be seconded from a force as the full-time secretary of the association. Additional funding was granted in 1983, 1995 and 2004 respectively for the posts of National President, National deputy secretary and vice president. In 2014 the post of deputy national secretary was removed and replaced by an employed police staff member as assistant secretary.

In 2018, the association shortened its name to become the Police Superintendents' Association (dropping 'of England and Wales') to more accurately reflect the UK-wide scope of its membership. On 23 May 2018, the Association became a private limited company. In 2020, current Home Secretary, Priti Patel, formally opened the refurbished head offices of the association in Pangbourne, Berkshire.

In May 2020, the association celebrated 100 years since the election of the first leader of the superintendents - Chief Superintendent Charles Dawson (Liverpool City Police) who was elected on 27 May 1920.

In July 2020, together with the Home Secretary and Policing Minister, the PSA held an online centenary celebration of the formation of the Police Council. The centenary was held on line due to health regulations during the pandemic

On 23 August 2021, former presidents and secretaries met at Pangbourne to celebrate the life of Superintendent Gerry Richardson, who was killed in the execution of his duty 50 years earlier.

== Membership ==
Serving police officers who are superintendents or chief superintendents in one of the 43 Home Office England and Wales police forces, the British Transport Police, the Civil Nuclear Constabulary, Isle of Man Constabulary, Bermuda Police, Royal Gibraltar Police and Gibraltar Defence Police can join the association. Since 2014, this has included the new direct entry superintendents recruited directly into the rank from outside the police service. The association has around 1,300 members. Eligible officers are not automatically enrolled and must opt-in to join, paying an annual subscription.

== Structure ==
There are currently 49 branches of the association, one for each of the 49 eligible forces. The branches are grouped together into five districts, A, B, C, D and E. These represent largely geographic areas but are configured to ensure a mixture of large metropolitan forces and smaller forces within each district. Branch officials, elected by their peers, are the voting members who attend district meetings. The number of delegates who attend from each Branch is in proportion to the number of members within the branch. District meetings are held three times a year, hosted by different branches in turn on a rota basis. National officers attend each district meeting.

The president chairs the association's national executive committee, which is its policy-making body. The NEC includes the vice president and two representatives from each district. There are also representatives for women members, black, Asian and minority ethnic (BME) members, lesbian, gay, bisexual and transgender (LGBT) members and disabled members. These ‘reserved places’ are elected and are there to ensure that the NEC represents and champions the diverse interests of superintendents and the wider service. The Association also has a representative from Wales to represent Welsh police interests. The NEC meets five times per year and the association holds an annual AGM, usually in spring. It also holds a national conference every September

== Presidents ==
Presidents were elected in March each year prior to 1993. After 1993, presidents were elected in March every three years.

- Oct 2023-Jan 2024 Supt Nick Smart, West Yorkshire (acting)
- 2022- 2023 C/Supt Paul Fotheringham, Kent
- 2019 - 2022 C/Supt Paul Griffiths, Gwent
- 2016-2019 C/Supt Gavin Thomas, Gloucestershire
- 2013-2016 C/Supt Irene Curtis, Lancashire
- 2010-2013 C/Supt Derek Barnett, Cheshire
- 2007-2010 C/Supt Ian Johnston, Gwent
- 2004-2007 C/Supt Rick Naylor, South Yorkshire
- 2001-2004 C/Supt Kevin Morris, Surrey
- 1998-2001 C/Supt Peter Gammon, Kent
- 1995-1998 C/Supt Brian Mackenzie, Durham
- 1993-1995 Chief Supt David Golding, Metropolitan
- 1992-1993 Chief Supt Eddie Day, Hampshire
- 1991-1992 Chief Supt David Golding, Metropolitan
- 1990-1991 Supt David P. Roberts, Avon & Somerset
- 1989-1990 Chief Supt Trevor B. Davey, West Yorkshire
- 1988-1989 Chief Supt Don Grieve, Merseyside
- 1987-1988 Chief Supt Michael Dixon, Norfolk
- 1986-1987 Chief Supt Leslie Stowe, Metropolitan
- 1985-1986 Supt Tony Parkes, Devon & Cornwall
- 1984-1985 Chief Supt K. Stuart Anderson, South Yorkshire
- 1983-1984 Chief Supt John Wigham, Lancashire
- 1982-1983 Chief Supt Harold Swatridge, Dorset
- 1981-1982 Chief Supt Douglas Taylor, West Yorkshire
- 1980-1981 Chief Supt Michael Bricknell, Thames Valley
- 1979-1980 Chief Supt Ken Rivers, Metropolitan
- 1978-1979 Chief Supt J. Wilkinson, South Yorkshire
- 1977-1978 Chief Supt Peter Hawkins, Avon & Somerset
- 1976-1977 Chief Supt Valentine Shortridge, Gwent
- 1975-1976 Chief Supt Robert Taylor, Metropolitan
- 1974-1975 Chief Supt H.M. Shelley, Derbyshire
- 1973-1974 Chief Supt W. John Hawkins, Gloucestershire
- 1972-1973 Supt Joan Parker, Durham
- 1971-1972 Chief Supt L. Barker, Metropolitan
- 1970-1971 Chief Supt R.E. Coombs, Hampshire
- 1969-1970 Chief Supt F.D. Slack, Norfolk
- 1968-1969 Chief Supt G.J. Kelland, Metropolitan
- 1967-1968 Chief Supt Wilkes, Cheshire

== Crest ==
In 2002, the association's 50th anniversary was marked with a new heraldic coat of arms. This was presented on behalf of Her Majesty at the association's national conference by the Lord Lieutenant for Cheshire Mr William Bromley Davenport.

== See also ==
- Police unions
