= Lynsey de Paul =

English singer-songwriter and record producer (1948–2014)

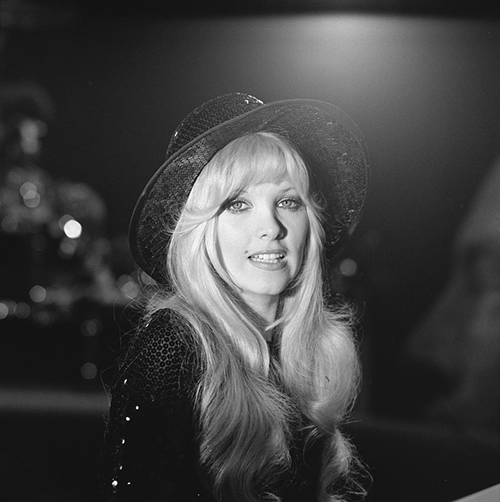
- de Paul in 1974

Background information
- Born: Lyndsey Monckton Rubin; 11 June 1948; Southwark, London, England
- Died: 1 October 2014 (aged 66) London, England
- Genre: Pop
- Occupations: Singer-songwriter; producer
- Instruments: Vocals; piano
- Years active: 1971–2014

Lynsey de Paul (born Lyndsey Monckton Rubin; 11 June 1948 – 1 October 2014) was an English singer-songwriter and record producer. After initially writing hits for others, she had her own chart hits in the UK and Europe in the 1970s, starting with UK top 10 single "Sugar Me", and became the first British female artist to achieve a number one with a self-written song (in 1972 in Belgium, Spain and the Netherlands). She represented the UK in the Eurovision Song Contest 1977 alongside Mike Moran with the song "Rock Bottom", finishing in second place and scoring another chart-topping hit in Switzerland, and had a successful career as a songwriter, record producer, actress and television celebrity.

== Early life ==
Lyndsey Monckton Rubin was born to Meta (née de Groot) and Herbert Rubin, a property developer. They were a Jewish family with a Dutch, Austrian and German background, and had one other child, John (born 1944). She studied classical music with a tutor from the Royal Academy of Music. She attended South Hampstead High School followed by Hornsey College of Art, now part of Middlesex University. After graduating, De Paul began designing record cover sleeve and poster artwork, notably for two albums by The Pipkins (who had an international hit with "Gimme Dat Ding"). De Paul later revealed that she and her brother suffered physical abuse at the hands of their father. In one incident as a student aged 19, de Paul was concussed for two days following a fight with her violent father, prompting her to leave her comfortable family home for a two-roomed flat above an Indian restaurant near her college.

== Career ==
=== Early songwriting ===
Three of de Paul's earliest songs were co-written with Don Gould (formerly a member of the Applejacks) and recorded by Oliver! performer Jack Wild: "Takin' It Easy" and "Bring Yourself Back To Me" from the album Everything's Coming Up Roses, which was released in 1971. "Bring Yourself Back To Me" was also the B-side to Wild's 1971 US single "(Holy Moses!) Everything's Coming Up Roses". Another song co-penned by her, this time with Edward Adamberry, called "E.O.I.O.", was recorded by Wild as a track on his 1972 album A Beautiful World, and also released as a single by the Beads as well as an album track, "Io...Aio (EEO-EIO)" by the Italian group Domodossola on their album D... Come Domodossola.

After these initial successes, she was contracted to ATV-Kirshner music publishing (now Sony Music Publishing) by Eddie Levy when she was 18 years old. ATV Music (now Sony Music Publishing) was located above the Peter Robinson's store on Oxford Street, where she joined a group of professional songwriters that included Barry Blue (at that time known as Barry Green) and Ron Roker (later to become Blue's brother-in-law), resulting in revenues from songs recorded by other artists. One of their earliest songs (and the only song where all three collaborated) was "Sugarloaf Hill", recorded by the reggae artist, Del Davis (with De Paul singing backing vocals) and finally released on the Trojan Carnival Box Set CD in 2003 as part of the Trojan Box Set series.

Her first major breakthrough came early in 1972 as the co-writer (with Ron Roker) of the Fortunes' top 10 UK hit "Storm in a Teacup". De Paul performed the song the same year on the BBC's The Two Ronnies. Canadian singer Ginette Reno recorded a French language version of the song ("Dans la vie, tout s'arrange") which reached No. 2 on the French-Canadian top 10. Around this time, she also had chart success in Malaysia and the Netherlands as the writer of "On the Ride (You Do It Once, You Do It Twice)", a top 30 hit by the Continental Uptight Band, and also "When You've Gotta Go", an Australian chart hit recorded and released by Solomon King. All three songs credited her as 'L. Rubin'. Other notable songs from this period included "Papa Do", which was released by Barry Green as a single, and made the lower reaches of the French singles chart, as well as "Crossword Puzzle", also co-penned with Barry Green and which led to an appearance on Top of the Pops and Saturday Variety for the Irish singer Dana. "Crossword Puzzle" peaked at No. 2 on the Bangkok singles chart. De Paul's own versions of both of these two songs would later be found as tracks on her debut album, Surprise. "Boomerang", the B-side to "Papa Do" and another de Paul/Blue collaboration was released as a single in the UK by the Young Generation, a group of dancers and singers recruited by Dougie Squires and they performed it on their BBC prime time TV show while a French version was also released by Jane and Julie. Geno Washington & the Ram Jam Band recorded their version of "Boomerang" in 1972, which appeared on their 1998 compilation album and their 2016 album, Geno!. In an interview with Cashbox in early 1972, Don Kirshner said "We are looking for another Carole King. We think we found her in Lynsey Rubin."

=== Singer-songwriter: Early to mid-1970s ===
Although she had recorded demo versions of her songs, de Paul was initially a reluctant performer. She wrote the song "Sugar Me" for Peter Noone, but her boyfriend at the time, Dudley Moore, suggested that she take a demo version to Gordon Mills, who urged her to record it herself and release it on his MAM record label. Explaining her change of name from Rubin, she said: "There had just been the massacre of Jewish athletes at the Munich Olympics and I was told that it would be better not to have an obviously Jewish name. For my stage name I took De from my mother's maiden name, De Groot, and my father's middle name was Paul". Released as a single on the MAM Records label, "Sugar Me" rapidly reached the top 10 of the UK Singles Chart, as well as the top of the singles charts in the Netherlands, Spain and Belgium. The arrangement featured a distinctive piano counter-melody motif as well as Hammond organ backing, a violin solo and a distinctive whip-crack.

This was the start of de Paul's becoming a regular British chart and television fixture over the next five years. Her follow-up single to "Sugar Me" was "Getting a Drag", which reached the UK top 20, as well as being a hit on the official German singles chart. She appeared on the first episode of the German music show Musikladen on 13 December 1972, where she performed her two German hit singles "Sugar Me" and "Getting a Drag", as well as a few weeks later performing "Doctor, Doctor", which would appear on her debut album several months later. She was listed as the best female artist of 1972 by Record Mirror, female performer of the year by Radio Luxembourg as well as the third best female singer in the 1973 New Musical Express (NME) music poll.

In March 1973, her first album, Surprise, was released on the MAM label. As well as writing or co-writing all of the songs on Surprise, de Paul was also the producer for all of the tracks. In his 2015 autobiography, label mate Tom Jones wrote: "We had Lynsey de Paul, a big star, though she fell out with Gordon (Mills) for wanting to produce her own records". Later that year, after "All Night", her third single, co-written with Ron Roker and released on the MAM label, failed to chart in the UK, de Paul returned to the UK top 20 with "Won't Somebody Dance with Me", which was also a hit in Ireland and the Netherlands and covered in the US. According to an interview with Michael Robson, featured in the liner notes to "Sugar and Beyond", de Paul had to fight hard to get this single released - indeed she would have preferred it in place of "All Night" and also to keep the long closing instrumental part of the song. She was vindicated since it was a chart hit and she was presented with an Ivor Novello Award for the song, the first woman to receive the award. The BBC Radio 1 disc jockey Ed Stewart spoke the words "May I have the pleasure of this dance" near the end of the record (he often played the record on his Junior Choice programme on Saturday mornings) although Tony Blackburn and Dave Lee Travis spoke these words when she appeared on BBC Television's Top of the Pops. De Paul performed the song on the 500th edition special on 4 October 1973, one day before the date of the release of the single. The flip side of "Won't Somebody Dance with Me" was "So Good to You", a song covered by Lenny Zakatek on the B-side of his single "I Gotcha Now". "I Gotcha Now" was also written by de Paul, originally for Slade. In Japan, "So Good to You" was released as the A-side with "Won't Somebody Dance with Me" being relegated to the B-side. Another song co-written by de Paul, "Today Gluggo, Tomorrow the World", was the B-side of "Don't You Let It Bring You Down" by the Spencer Davis Group, as well as an album track on their 1973 Gluggo.

De Paul recorded the female lyric to Mott the Hoople's album track version of "Roll Away the Stone", but the female trio Thunderthighs appeared on the hit single version of the song. However, the de Paul album version was released as a single in Japan, with the single being credited to "Mott The Hoople & Lynsey de Paul". She was also credited for backing vocals on a second track on the album The Hoople called "Alice". In 1973, when Mick Ralphs left Mott the Hoople, his replacement Luther Grosvenor was contractually obliged to change his name – de Paul suggested Ariel Bender. She also provided backing vocals (credited as "Loony") on "Rock 'n' Roll Winter (Loony's Tune) (Sorry, the Word Spring Wouldn't Fit)" and thus helped Wizzard (fronted by Roy Wood; her boyfriend at the time) reach the UK top 10 in 1974. In February of that year, de Paul was voted top female singer in the UK music weekly Disc Readers Awards Poll, while David Bowie was voted top male singer and Slade the top group. De Paul was also voted female singer of 1974 by Israeli radio station Galei Zahal.

After appointing Don Arden her new manager at the end of 1973, in part because her former manager Harold Davison fell ill earlier that year, de Paul released "Ooh I Do" in May 1974, which became a chart hit in the UK, Belgium, Netherlands, Brazil and Japan. The song's co-writer, Barry Blue, also recorded a version of the song as an album track with different lyrics for the verses. De Paul also wrote her first TV theme tune ("Pilger theme") for Pilger where journalist, John Pilger, examined various political issues at the time (1974-1977) in a series of 25 minute documentaries. Another theme song, this time co-written with Barry Blue, was recorded and released as a single by the UK group Rain, featuring Stephanie De Sykes as the vocalist. The song "Golden Day", released as a single on 12 July 1974, was used as the theme for the TV game show The Golden Shot.

A second Ivor Novello Award followed a year later for "No, Honestly", which was also the theme tune to the hit ITV comedy No, Honestly, and provided her with another UK top 10 hit. The B-side to this single was de Paul's version of "Central Park Arrest", the song she had written for Thunderthighs and which had provided them with a top 30 UK hit single a few months earlier. The TV series No, Honestly was followed by Yes, Honestly, and although Georgie Fame wrote and performed the theme tune to the first series of Yes Honestly, an instrumental version of de Paul's "No, Honestly" was chosen as the theme for the second series. "No Honestly" was the first release on the newly formed Jet Records, established by Don Arden. She also wrote the second single that was released on the label, a song called "My One and Only" by UK female singing trio Bones. Her second album, Taste Me... Don't Waste Me, was the first album release on Jet Records and was her favourite of all her albums. De Paul continued to release singles through the mid-1970s, including the UK hit "My Man and Me", which she performed an acoustic version of on The Old Grey Whistle Test, along with "Rhythm and Blue Jean Baby", "Love Bomb", "Hug and Squeeze Me" and "If I Don't Get You the Next One Will".

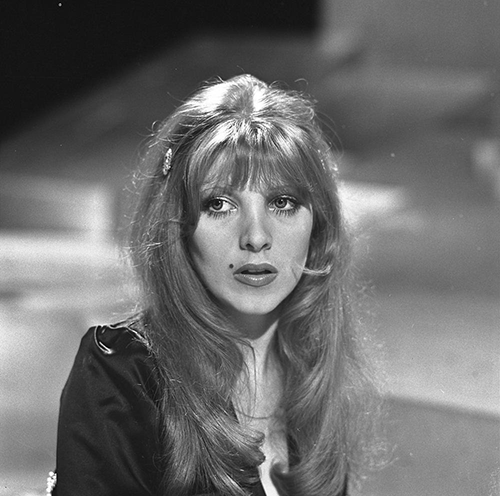
De Paul on the television program TopPop, 1973.

De Paul also continued to write songs for a wide range of recording artists. In a five-year period (1972–77), she wrote a total of fourteen UK Singles Chart hits, most notably the Carl Allen award-winning song "Dancin' (on a Saturday Night)" which was a hit for co-writer Barry Blue, as well as Flash Cadillac and the Canadian group Bond. More hit singles co-written with Blue and performed by him followed, including "School Love", "Miss Hit and Run" and "Hot Shot". They finally released a duet at the end of 1975, the festive "Happy Christmas to You from Me", which was co-written by the duo. The song received favourable reviews and continues to receive plays over the years. Other notable songs co-written by de Paul and Blue include "Tip of My Tongue" which was a radio hit and UK chart bubbler for the British group Brotherly Love as well as female vocal trio Ellie (a.k.a. the Hope Sisters who would later become Liquid Gold) and "House of Cards" recorded by artists including John Christie, Australian artist Rob Guest and the DJ Tony Blackburn. De Paul's songs have reached the charts in many territories, including the US, Japan, Germany, the Netherlands, France, Switzerland, Belgium, Austria, Sweden, Norway, Ireland, Israel, Canada and Australia. She also worked as a producer and arranger on many of these recordings.

Her third album, Love Bomb, was released on Jet Records in 1975. Whereas the title track was released as a single in most territories, in the US and Japan the track "Sugar Shuffle" was released as a single. Later, US soul singer Cheryl Lynn would release her version of "Love Bomb" on her 1979 album "In Love" and Japanese singer Asami Kobayashi released a cover version of "Sugar Shuffle" on her 1984 album Cryptograph. The cover sleeve for the Love Bomb album was photographed by Brian Aris but she was also photographed that year by Terry O'Neill. De Paul was voted best female singer in a poll by the readers of the weekly music newspaper Record Mirror & Disc for the third year in a row in February 1976.

In April 1976, she appeared with Sacha Distel (who had, together with Petula Clark, recorded a version of "Taking It On", composed by de Paul and Ron Roker in 1973) and Marti Caine at the London Palladium. Later that year she was the recipient of the 'Woman of the Year Award For Music' from the Variety Club of Great Britain. Management problems with Don Arden, however, made this a difficult time for de Paul and her third album for Jet Records, Before You Go Tonight, was shelved as the two parted ways shortly after the release of "If I Don't Get You The Next One Will", her last single of the Jet Records label. Nevertheless, that year she recorded the only cover song of her recording career, the Lennon–McCartney song "Because" that appeared on the soundtrack to the movie All This and World War II. The song appeared on a double album released in 1976 to tie in with the film. The album charted in the US, the UK New Zealand and the Netherlands, and was re-released as The Beatles and World War II on CD in July 2016.

De Paul co-wrote the song "Don't You Remember When" in 1976 for Dame Vera Lynn, after guesting on her show and being impressed by the length of time for which Lynn could hold a single note – the song features a long sustained note at the end. "Don't You Remember When" was released as a single on the EMI Records label in February 1976 and de Paul was also the producer as well as singing backing vocals. Another notable guest was ex-Beatle Ringo Starr, who played the tambourine. De Paul also wrote and performed the theme song for "A Divorce", a series of three plays by Fanny Galleymore starring Julia Foster, Polly James and Michael Kitchen for the BBC that was also broadcast on German TV. De Paul also performed her song "Funny How Things Can Change" in one of the episodes. De Paul was one of the guests at the UK premiere of The Song Remains the Same by Led Zeppelin at Warner West End Cinema, London on 4 November 1976. On 22 December that year, de Paul attended a charity dinner hosted by Prince Charles, that was also attended by Elton John and Gary Glitter. De Paul and John played Christmas carols on the piano for the Prince.

=== Eurovision and the late 1970s ===
"Rock Bottom", which she wrote with Mike Moran originally for Blue Mink, was chosen as the UK entry in the Eurovision Song Contest 1977 and released on Polydor. The duo also wrote and performed the B-side, the amusing "You Shouldn't Say That". De Paul made history by being the first woman to perform her own composition at the Eurovision Song Contest. As she later explained, as well as being an honour, taking part in Eurovision was a way to circumvent the legal wrangles that were preventing her from signing to a new record label. Although it was the favourite to win, it came second in the Eurovision Song Contest and went on to become a Top 20 hit in many European countries including France, Germany, Austria and Switzerland, where it reached the top of their singles chart. It was the 15th best selling single of 1977 in Switzerland and the 32nd best selling single in Germany. The Eurovision experience resulted in a formal offer to stand as a Liberal parliamentary candidate by chief party whip John Pardoe. "It started when I shot my mouth off over the strike of BBC cameramen that threatened to black out the song contest in England", she recalled. Pardoe, deputy leader of the Liberal Party, invited her to tea at the House of Commons and suggested that she run for a seat in Parliament. That year she also joined the Council of the Songwriters Guild of Great Britain, the only woman on the council at that time.

Together with Moran, de Paul subsequently wrote other songs, notably "Let Your Body Go Downtown" (1977) for the Martyn Ford Orchestra, a No. 38 UK chart hit that Ford and his Orchestra performed on Top of the Pops; and the follow-up non-album single "Going to a Disco", credited solely to Martyn Ford as well as the songs "Without You", and "Now and Then", which appeared on the albums Tigers and Fireflies and Just a Little Time, respectively.

Beach Boys member Bruce Johnston released his version of "Won't Somebody Dance With Me" on his 1977 solo album Going Public, as did Lena Zavaroni on her 1977 album Presenting Lena Zavaroni. The song was also featured in the 1978 film The Big Sleep, a remake of the American classic featuring Robert Mitchum, Joan Collins, Edward Fox, John Mills and directed by Michael Winner. The character Mona Grant, played by Diana Quick, actually sings the song. "Won't Somebody Dance With Me" was also featured in The Muppet Show, sung by Gonzo (Season Two, Episode 41 with Julie Andrews) as well as in The New Mickey Mouse Club performed by Lisa Whelchel.

De Paul released a further single "You Give Me Those Feelings" in August 1977. The song was also recorded by Gracie Rivera, a Filipina singer based in Hong Kong with EMI as a track on her 1978 album Grace Anne Rivera. In 1977, de Paul also wrote and performed the theme music for the revival by London Weekend Television of the sitcom, The Rag Trade (1977), with the song "The Rag Trade" performed by Joan Brown. That same year she composed "Hi Summer", the title of an ITV variety show, performed by Carl Wayne and released as a single produced by de Paul. In addition to songs composed by her serving as the themes of nine prime-time UK television series, de Paul's songs have been featured in internationally released films such as The Big Sleep, The Long Good Friday, Anita and Me, Side by Side, Aces Go Places, American Swing, Northern Soul, Fraulein Phyllis and Cut Snake.

Just over a year after the release of "You Give Me Those Feelings", de Paul released her next single "Hollywood Romance", probably inspired by her then recent move to California; the lyric is a playful homage to some of Hollywood's classic films. The single garnered radio play and was also covered by Lena Zavaroni on her TV show. It was a teaser and track on the 1979 album Tigers and Fireflies, which was produced by Rupert Holmes. Justin de Villeneuve was de Paul's manager at the time and the album was recorded at Long View Farm. A second single, "Tigers and Fireflies", released in 1979 and lifted from the album, told of de Paul's experiences with various former managers. Holmes and de Paul co-wrote the song "Twas", which also appeared on Tigers and Fireflies. The album also featured a bluesy version of de Paul's hit "My Man and Me".

=== Branching out in the 1980s ===
After a four-year period in California in the late 1970s and early 1980s with her partner at the time, actor James Coburn, whom she met at a party thrown by Joan Collins de Paul returned to England. Although she only released one self-composed solo single, "Strange Changes", in the 1980s, it made the UK disco chart, published in the music magazine Record Mirror, and resulted in prime time TV appearances in the UK and Germany. She co-wrote with Terry Britten "A Little TLC", which was covered by Sam Hui as "心思思" with Cantonese lyrics and it was awarded an RTHK Top 10 Gold Songs Award in Hong Kong in 1986. Other versions of this song were recorded by Latino boy band Menudo, with lead vocals by Ricky Martin as a track on their 1988 album Sons of Rock; as well as Japan based Filipina soul singer Marlene as a track on her album Looking for Love; and also featured in the US children's television programme, Kidd Video. De Paul later released her own version of the song on her website music store. Her song "Brandy", which had been the B-side of the single "Getting a Drag" was released by Japanese singer Miki Asakura on her 1981 album "Sexy Elegance" with new lyrics and the title "Friday Night". Whilst continuing to write songs for artists as diverse as Shirley Bassey ("There's No Place Like London"), funk/soul band Heatwave, Marti Webb (both recording the song "All I Am") and the Real Thing ("We Got Love"), de Paul also branched out into record production, acting in musicals and plays, interviewing and TV presentation and drawing cartoons. She also continued to compose TV themes, including for the BBC's 1981 comedy series The Olympian Way and in 1988 the long-running Esther Rantzen programme Hearts of Gold which was released as a single on CBS by the artist "Gold" in November 1988.

De Paul was a celebrity participant in the TV show Christmas Star Games, a Thames Television production shown on ITV on 26 December 1980. In 1982, she hosted a Sunday morning radio show on Capital Radio (now Capital London) to promote new talent in the music business. The show included selected examples of the many demonstration tapes received by the station from London's vast popular music-making population over the years. Eduard Parma Jr. a musician from the Czech Republic, was selected as the winner of a contest on de Paul's show with his own quirky song "King Kong in Hong Kong" and it was released as a single, which became a hit in his native country. It was widely played at London discos, in particular at the Empire, Leicester Square by DJ Roy Kelly.

In 1982, De Paul made her acting debut onstage in Iain Blair's thriller Shriek! at the Churchill Theatre, Bromley and, in the following year, on television in Granada's The Starlight Ballroom, when she played the lead female character, alongside Alvin Stardust. Her first panto appearance was as "Cinderella's Star Night" where de Paul played Cinderella with Joanna Lumley playing Prince Charming as part of an all-star cast to raise funds for The Bobath Centre held at the Prince Edward Theatre, London, on 31 January 1982. The script was written by writers including Michael Frayn, Jack Rosenthal and John Cleese with the epilogue provided by Alan Ayckbourn and narrated by Ian McKellen and also featured Joanna Lumley, Nigel Havers and Helen Mirren. De Paul also appeared in Aladdin at the Shaftesbury Theatre in 1983 and Jack and the Beanstalk (Oxford Playhouse, 1989). She also appeared as the character Prudie in Pump Boys and Dinettes (Piccadilly Theatre, 1985).

In 1983, de Paul orchestrated, played, and produced two updated classical recordings for Deutsche Grammophon and released "Air on a Heart String" ("Air on the G String" composed by Bach) backed with "Arrival of the Queen" ("The Arrival of the Queen of Sheba" composed by Handel) with panflautist Horea Crishan. During this period, de Paul began composing and performing songs for children. This included writing the music for the children's film Gabrielle and the Doodleman, in which she had a starring role as an actress. That same year, she also appeared with Carl Davis in a specially commissioned film "What Price Music?" for the Performing Rights Society (PRS) (now known as the PRS for Music) explaining how the PRS looks after its 15,000 members as well as almost half a million affiliated members worldwide.

De Paul also composed jingles for radio stations including Capital Radio. In 1983, she appeared at the Conservative Party conference with DJ Kenny Everett and film producer Michael Winner, where she sang a song she had composed especially for the occasion: "Vote Tory, Tory, Tory/For election glory". She was the subject of the first episode of a TV series about female singers called "Ladybirds", directed by Bryan Izzard.<ref>Rock & Pop on British TV, Jeff Evans, Omnibus Press, 2017-01-27, ISBN 9781783057955</ref> As well as being interviewed about her music and life, she played some of her most famous compositions, as well as her version of "All I Am" and a new song, "Thunder in the Night". She also played a solo version of "Arrival of the Queen of Sheba" on various synthesisers/keyboards on a London roof top with a great view overlooking St Paul's Cathedral. Some years later, her version of this song would later become the theme song for a German TV programme.

De Paul was the special guest of the day on Good Morning Britain: with Nick Owen and Anne Diamond on 17 February 1984. She also made a guest appearance on the Rod and Emu Show (aka Rod and Emu's Saturday Special) on the 10 March 1984, where she performed her self-composed song, "Thunder in the Night". On 19 November 1984, de Paul was honoured to be one of the performers at the Royal Variety Performance in the presence of Queen Elizabeth II as well as the Queen Mother and the Prince and Princess of Wales and Lady Sarah Armstrong-Jones at the Victoria Palace Theatre. The complete show was aired on BBC One.

In 1985, she was a judge on the television talent show New Faces and also on "Sky Star Search" as well as a regular panellist on the television shows Call My Bluff, Punchlines, and Blankety Blank. She hosted television shows such as Club Vegetarian, Shopper's Heaven, Eat Drink & Be Healthy, Women of Substance, The Vinyl Frontier and 15 episodes of Living Room Legends, which featured home videos.

In 1986, she appeared on Spanish TV as a guest on the Àngel Casas Show singing two of her 1980s compositions "Suspicion" and "Words Don't Mean a Thing" as well as her Spanish number one hit single "Sugar Me". A year later, de Paul was back on UK television singing "Take Back Your Heartaches" (co-written by Gerard Kenny - his version appeared on his 1995 album An Evening with Gerard Kenny Live) and "Words Don't Mean a Thing". That year, de Paul took part in two days of music and fun on 5 and 6 July at the Royal Academy of Music in aid of its international appeal

De Paul also appeared on the ITV Telethon in 1988 and was part of the celebrity ensemble singing a medley of songs with presenter and singer Cilla Black. On 21 April 1989, she was a special guest and performed songs during RTÉ Television coverage of the first People in Need Trust Telethon.

=== Taking control: the 1990s ===
In January 1991, de Paul (along with Midge Ure and Justin Hayward) was elected to BASCA's decision making council. De Paul was a member of the judging panel for the UK 1992 "Song For Europe" entry, the only woman on the 13 member panel. That year, de Paul returned to the public spotlight in a different role in 1992 when she released a self-defence video for women called Taking Control. As well as starring in the video, both as the presenter and demonstrator of self-defence techniques, she co-wrote and was the producer for the theme song and incidental music with Ian Lynn. Baron Mackenzie of Framwellgate, former president of the Police Association, endorsed it by saying: "It is a very positive contribution to crime prevention and the protection of women and I will be recommending it". She also presented a documentary about women's self-defence, called Eve Fights Back, which won a Royal Television Society award. A book based on the programme and video written by de Paul and Clare McCormick with the title Taking Control: Basic Mental & Physical Self Defence for Women, was published by Boxtree in 1993. In 2006, an updated DVD of her self-defence training programme, Taking Control: Simple Mental & Physical Self Defence for Women, was released and featured on television (The Wright Stuff) and in the media. The programme showed the importance of self-defence for women, and she approached schools and universities to include the DVD in the curriculum. It was also released in Germany, (title Selbstverteidigung für Frauen: Das komplette Trainingsprogramm) dubbed in German.

That same year, music magazine Rock Compact Disc Magazine, published by Northern & Shell PLC, listed the de Paul MAM 1970's compilation album Lynsey Sings aka The World of Lynsey de Paul (comprising all of the tracks from the Surprise album plus various non-album singles and B-sides) as one of the top 50 glam rock era albums in their "Wham Bam, Thank You Glam: 50 Glam Era Highlights 1972-1974" listing, with a greatest hits album from co-writer and colleague Barry Blue that also included his four hit singles written with de Paul also featuring in the listing and cementing their glam credentials.

In 1994, she released her first album in 15 years entitled Just a Little Time. It featured newly recorded and released songs, notably "Words Don't Mean a Thing" and "We Got Love", as well as reworked and updated versions of many of her classic hits, plus two club mixes of "Sugar Me" and "Getting a Drag". This was a CD-only release on the Music DeLuxe label that has since been re-issued on other labels such as ARC Records and Tring International. That year, she also released a new single "There's No Place Like London", her version of the song she had written for Shirley Bassey, featuring an all-star cast that included Frankie Vaughan, Patti Boulaye, Gareth Hunt, Kenny Lynch, Rula Lenska, Gwen Taylor, Lionel Blair, Lorraine Chase, Pam St. Clement, Harry Fowler, Polly James, Larry Adler, Rose Marie, Victor Spinetti, Gorden Kaye and the St Joan of Arc School Choir and credited to Lynsey & Friends. The song was the winning record for the LBC London Parade and it went on sale to raise money for the Variety Club. In an LBC radio programme, de Paul discussed how it came about and how it got its title. Lorraine Chase who sang on the track, also discussed her role. Elizabeth Cohen of Nonsuch High School and David Burditch of St Joan of Arc School in Rickmanshaw, described how their schools became involved in the recording. Lionel Blair urged everyone to join the parade to promote London and Ian Fenn provided a report from Stock Aitken Waterman's Hit Factory, where the record was produced.

One year later, de Paul also co-wrote with Ian Lynn an album How Do You Do - I'm Marcus, for the opening of Eurotunnel, which was released on CD in 1995. It was a children's album that told the story of Marcus the Mole and various other characters, as featured in the book by Cheryl Wilson. De Paul also performed some of the tracks on the album credited as the character Michelle ("He Can't Dance") and also Moleye ("Old Mole and Grandma"). Other artists appearing on the album included Ron Moody (who sang "A Little Learning" as Prof. Maurice Molehead), Kate Robbins, Ian Lynn, Tony Jackson (bass player) and Jon Glover. It came with an accompanying song colouring book for Eurotunnel's mascot, entitled Marcus The Mole,

De Paul also signed up with Leosong in 1995, along with Barry Mason, Lonnie Donegan and Debbie Wiseman. Gerard Kenny released his version of "Take Back Your Heartache", a song that he co-wrote with de Paul on his 1995 album, An Evening with..., as well as his Old Friends album and that de Paul performed as "Take Back Your Heartaches" on TV in the UK. In 1996, her song "Martian Man" was featured on a CD single "The Milkman" by the Julianne Regan fronted group Mice. Regan is a long-time fan of de Paul and sought her approval to record the song, albeit in a very different style to the original more ethereal version. The single made it to the lower reaches of the UK Singles Chart. It was also a track on the album New & Improved by Mice. In 1998, an album entitled Kucinta by the Indonesian singer Yana Julio, featured a cover version of the de Paul/Sheridan song "All I Am".

De Paul conceived and presented the TV series Women of Substance in 1998. Guests included Judy Finnigan, Diana Moran, Claudia Winkleman, and Heather Mills. In 1999, de Paul was featured on the cover of Saga Magazine, published by Saga plc, together with a lengthy interview where she discussed her early years, how she became a successful songwriter and her later four-year relationship with James Coburn and living with him in Los Angeles. De Paul stated for the first time that during this period she was in talks with Dolly Parton's management, but that they mysteriously broke off. She also spoke at length about her belief in the need for self-defence for women, giving the background to how she conceived the "Eve Fights Back" (aka "Eve Strikes Back") TV documentary and the "Taking Control" video. That year she was also one of the judges for the Sony Radio Awards.

=== 2000s ===
In 2000, de Paul was present for the launch of the charity "Support for Africa 2000", with the aim to help those suffering from the effects of HIV/AIDS or malaria at a reception at the Nigerian Embassy in London, hosted by HE Prince Bola Ajibola, the Nigerian High Commissioner to the UK. Among the guests were Princess Katarina of Yugoslavia; tenor Russell Watson, who sang a duet with the charity's president Patti Boulaye; and Errol Brown. De Paul was a long-term supporter of this charity and appeared at a number of their events and concerts. She was a guest at the Cosmopolitan 30th anniversary event in 2002. In 2002, the de Paul/Blue song "Dancin' (on a Saturday Night)" was featured in the film Anita and Me as well as on the soundtrack album and one year later it was also featured in the cult TV program Monkey Dust.

De Paul, together with friend and Childline founder Esther Rantzen was one of the comperes and appeared with a host of stars and celebrities at the "Children Will Listen: A 75th Birthday Tribute to Stephen Sondheim" event in aid of Childline held on Sunday 23 October 2005.

Her longstanding contribution to the music industry was recognised in 2005 when de Paul received a Gold Badge Award from BASCA (now the Ivors Academy). This was followed by her becoming a director on the board of the Performing Rights Society (PRS) on 30 June 2006 where she proved to be a long serving and active member. The PRS was renamed PRS for Music and in 2009 de Paul was re-elected for a second three-year term. She was held in high regard by her peers at PRS, where she also served as Trustee of the Members Benevolent Fund.

Since she had trained as an artist at the Hornsey College of Art and was a talented cartoonist (as evidenced from the gatefold album sleeve of her debut album, Surprise and other album sleeves she designed), she was employed as the resident cartoonist for OK! in its first year of weekly distribution in 2006, with her humorous pocket-cartoon series entitled "Light Entertainment". She also provided cartoons for the women's magazine Chic with another series of pocket-cartoons entitled "Woman to Woman".

A 2006 episode of the BBC Radio 2 series Sold on Song, included Gamble and Huff, who talked about how they wrote some of their classic songs. Some were performed with Sheila Ferguson singing, and the program featured de Paul as well as Kim Appleby, Guy Fletcher, Steve Levine and David Arnold.

In 2007, de Paul briefly returned to acting and played the glamorous character 'Sheila Larsen' in the first episode of Kingdom, the Stephen Fry drama series. Peter Kingdom managed to clear up a feud between Sheila Larsen's two sons that starts after she dies suddenly and whose money apparently disappeared. She also appeared on the BBC program Breakfast on 4 October 2007 talking about the loss of her friend and colleague Ronnie Hazlehurst; specifically the TV themes he penned and his conducting of the orchestra with rolled up umbrella for de Paul and Moran at the 1977 Eurovision Song Contest, where he was dressed in a pin-striped suit and a bowler hat. On 10 April 2008, de Paul participated in a celebrity version of the Channel 4 show Come Dine with Me along with Tamara Beckwith, MC Harvey and Jonathan Ansell. De Paul, who was the only vegetarian among the group, came in last place. She was also the subject of a celebrity version of Cash in the Attic in March 2009 where she became a temporary auctioneer.

In 2008, a digital-only album of songs by members of the British Academy of Songwriters, Composers, and Authors (BASCA - now The Ivors Academy) entitled Songs From The British Academy, Vol. 1 featured de Paul singing her song "Words Don't Mean a Thing", as well as other classic British artists such as Boy George, Peter Gabriel, KT Tunstall, Brian May, The Pretenders, Robin Gibb and Cliff Richard.

She wrote the foreword for the 2009 book Medium Rare about the spiritual medium Liam Scott who is one of the UK's leading stage psychics. She was one of the interviewees in an article "60 years old: happy birthday to the single" where celebrities and media personalities were asked to name a single that was important to them. De Paul chose "Love Came to Me" by Dion and the Belmonts (1962) and said "It was a really good pop record of its time. Certain songs have emotional associations in one's life. This was almost a coming of age."

In 2011, de Paul had her own programme on Sky, entitled Lynsey's Love Songs. According to a news item on her website, she chose the songs she liked and researched the songwriters and people who made the records. De Paul also joined Vintage TV and in February 2012, the channel broadcast three episodes where de Paul interviewed the songwriters Gilbert O'Sullivan, Mike Batt and Howard Jones. Aled Jones interviewed de Paul on his Good Morning Sunday programme on BBC Radio 2 on 29 April 2012. He asked her about her life, career and religious beliefs as well as what inspired her. She attended the 2012 Ivor Novello Awards held at the Grosvenor House Hotel, London, on 17 May 2012. She was a member of the UK jury for the Eurovision Song Contest 2012. On 31 May that year, an interview with de Paul and her songs "Sugar Me" and "Getting a Drag" were featured in the BBC Radio 2 documentary, "The Radio Luxembourg Story", about former rival station Radio Luxembourg.

On 15 September 2012, de Paul, together with Noddy Holder, co-hosted the Marc Bolan 35th anniversary concert, a special charity event for the PRS for Music Members Benevolent Fund held at the O2 Shepherd's Bush Empire featuring Marc Almond, Boy George, Tony Visconti, Steve Harley, Alvin Stardust, Linda Lewis, Sandie Shaw, Glen Matlock, Mike Lindup, Andy Ellison and the Marc Bolan tribute band, Danielz and T.Rextasy. De Paul and Holder received glowing reviews as did the performers. One week later, de Paul was on stage again, appearing in the play, Hollywood Love. She played the role of the American actress and gossip columnist Hedda Hopper, together with Jeff Stewart, who portrayed the actor Gareth Hughes, who was Hopper's friend. From 2013 until her death, de Paul was a regular guest newspaper reviewer for BBC Radio London 94.9 FM on the Simon Lederman Show, commenting on the day's news and current affairs.

Two double CD anthologies of de Paul's songs from the 1970s including previously unreleased tracks, entitled Sugar and Beyond and Into My Music, were released in March 2013 on the Cherry Red/RPM record label, a project that was personally overseen by de Paul. Also that month, de Paul appeared as a guest on The Ken Bruce BBC Radio 2 programme, "Tracks of my Years", where she selected some of her favourite songs from other artists such as John Lennon, Earth, Wind & Fire, Lee Ann Womack and R. Kelly. De Paul was one of the guests at the PRS for Music event "100 Years of Music" VIP launch in London, along with other UK based songwriters such as Cathy Dennis, Glenn Tilbrook, Mike Batt, Bob Geldof and Gary Kemp in March 2014. One of her last public appearances was as a trustee and guest at the unveiling of the Spike Milligan statue at Avenue House in Finchley on 4 September 2014.

In 2015, PRS for Music established an annual Lynsey de Paul prize for emerging female singer-songwriters in honour of the singer-songwriter. The 2015 winner of the prize was Emma McGrath, who was presented with the award at an event celebrating the life of Lynsey de Paul, hosted by Esther Rantzen. McGrath later said in an interview with Women's Music News "...I was 15 and I won the Lynsey de Paul Prize. I think that award is significant because she was creating a career at a time when it probably wasn't as easy as it is now to be a female in the music industry". The second Lynsey de Paul prize was presented to Elsa Hewitt in September 2016. Jemio was awarded the prize in 2017. The PRS Foundation announced the 2018 winners of the Lynsey de Paul Prize on 27 September 2018, with soul singer-songwriter Amahla receiving the top bursary and five other (Bianca Gerald, Dani Sylvia, Fiona Lee, Rebekah Fitch and Harpy) being runners up. Amahla went on to receive a "Rising Star Award" from Apple Music, as announced by PRS.

In March 2018, de Paul was listed as one of the 65 iconic, most influential, women who have helped define the UK music industry from the 1950s until the present day by Annie Rew Shaw in Women's Music News. Her performance of her song "Sugar Shuffle" appeared on the Bob Stanley compiled album, 76 In The Shade, released in August 2020. It reached No. 23 on the Dutch album charts.

=== Media mentions and influence ===
At least four of de Paul's songs have been used as the basis for other songs. The first was "All I Am", which formed the music for the Buddha Monk song "Dedicated" that appeared on his 1998 Billboard charting album The Prophecy and that was co-credited to de Paul and Susan Sheridan. Bilal performed the song "Certified" which incorporates a looped sample of Klaus Wunderlich's version of "Sugar Me" and resulted in a writing credit for de Paul and Blue on Guru's Jazzmatazz, Vol. 3: Streetsoul album, released in 2000, which reached No. 32 on the Billboard 200 and No. 72 on the UK Albums Chart. The third song is "You Don't Know", by UK soul/funk outfit Smoove & Turrell, that credits de Paul with co-writing the song; as it featured a long sample of her track "Water" from her debut album, Surprise.

The original recording of her song "Won't Somebody Dance With Me" featured on a playlist of songs that director Nicolas Winding Refn circulated to the cast and crew of his film The Neon Demon to get them into the right mood for filming, and this was released on the album The Wicked Die Young, although this appears to be a cover version by Tina Charles.

De Paul has been impersonated on television programmes such as The Goodies Rule – O.K.?, aired on BBC One on 21 December 1975 where de Paul is played by Tim Brooke Taylor. The book Diary of a Rock'n'Roll Star by Ian Hunter mentions de Paul as a singer/songwriter of repute. In the 1998 novel Breakfast on Pluto by Patrick McCabe, the main character Patrick is said to resemble de Paul when he dresses up as his alter ego "Pussy". One chapter in the book is entitled "Lynsey de Paul" and another "Dancing on a Saturday Night"; plus de Paul's first hit "Sugar Me" was also mentioned. In the film version, his alter ego became "Kitten" and the de Paul reference was replaced by Dusty Springfield. De Paul is also mentioned in the book Untorn Tickets by Paul Burke. A character in the TV comedy movie You Are Here played by Paul Kaye is named Detective Inspector Lindsay de Paul. Her song "Sugar Me" is mentioned as one of the 10 songs used for writing the Dave Jeanes book Sweet Dreams.

The actor and writer Tom Conti told de Paul that he had written the book The Doctor, and she put him in contact with the publisher Jeremy Robson who published the book. De Paul was a guest of honour at the book launch party held at The Royal Society of Medicine, Chandos House, London on 29 September 2004. Carla Lane, writer of The Liver Birds, Butterflies and Bread, credited de Paul for goading her to write her autobiography, Someday I'll Find Me. The Sharon Osbourne autobiography, Sharon Osbourne Extreme: My Autobiography, reveals that she was de Paul's day-to-day person at Jet Records and that the two of them travelled to Los Angeles and the Seychelles. De Paul is also mentioned in Vail by Trevor Hoyle.

Muppets creator, Jim Henson, was a friend of de Paul and James Coburn and, in his Red Book, revealed that he stayed in a guest house owned by de Paul in 1978, and he also spent Christmas Eve 1979 with de Paul and Coburn. She also featured in David Bailey and David Litchfield's Ritz Newspaper in 1979. De Paul is also a contributor to Looking at Life, a book by Joe Pyle, a boxer turned film producer/recording manager, dispensing advice based on his life's experiences. An article in The New York Times by Laura Rysman entitled "How to Host a Dinner Party", included de Paul's "Sugar Me" on D.J. Michel Gaubert's special dinner-party playlist. De Paul is also featured in the 2009 book, Style City: How London Became a Fashion Capital, written by Robert O'Byrne.

Robert Holmes, the founder of the musical group Love Bomb, was inspired to choose this name for the group because of the de Paul song of the same name. The song "Rock 'n' Roll Winter (Loony's Tune)", a UK chart hit by Wizzard was inspired and dedicated to de Paul by the song's writer, Roy Wood. She is mentioned in the song "False Grit" by Half Man Half Biscuit. She is also mentioned in the lyrics to the song "Man out of Time" by musician, poet and erstwhile The Smiths collaborator, Vinny Peculiar (aka Alan Wilkes) that appeared on his 2019 album While You Still Can. De Paul was also name checked in the film The Great Rock 'n' Roll Swindle where it is mentioned that Richard Branson is in a mansion that "overlooked the tomb of Karl Marx and the bedroom of Lynsey de Paul". The song "Black Crow" by London-based duo Beyond the Wizard's Sleeve, was inspired by her song "Sugar Me". De Paul is mentioned in the chorus of the song "70s Angels" by Tom Aspaul, a track on his 2025 album, Cabin Fever.

Spanish singer-songwriter, Lia Pamina, cites de Paul as an influence, as has the British singer Kim Wilde. Toyah Willcox also acknowledged that de Paul was "a really good songwriter". The American singer songwriter Tori Amos has been compared to de Paul. In 2026, the American singer songwiter Kate Bollinger revealed that her "Shop Girl" was inspired by de Paul as well as Kate Bush.

De Paul's photo appeared in the Patrick Lichfield book The Most Beautiful Women. The Louis Vuitton Spring Summer 2012 fashion show advertisement campaign, used de Paul's "Sugar Me" as the soundtrack, as did Adam Selman for his Spring/Summer 2018 show as part of the New York Fashion Week held in September 2017. "Sugar Me" also featured on the sound track to the 2021 US TV series "Physical".

Paul Phillips, the British singer-songwriter, journalist at Music Week, and a former A&R man and record producer at CBS Records, recalled "Lynsey de Paul was tougher than she looked, and more talented than her career appeared to allow for. She was the first female to win an Ivor Novello Award, and it wasn't her last. Her name as writer or co-writer is on a lot more songs than those you remember her for. She was a woman in what was, for sure, a man's world. For all her female and feminine attributes, she held her own with the toughest, including Sean Connery and James Coburn. Later, she learned self-defence and made documentaries on the subject, for other women. She donated to charities that helped battered women. Later still, she admitted her father had been violently abusive. Much of her post-pop life was devoted to bringing focus to ways in which women could protect themselves, mentally and physically. So she wasn't the pop poppet of her 70s image. She was a gifted musician, classically trained. She arranged and recorded various pieces of classical music, which she scored for her own style".

In an interview with Drew Tosh from Northern Soul about female singer-songwriters, Bronté Barbé said: "In the early 70s UK musical landscape, Lynsey de Paul was the only British woman to achieve major success with her own work. She wrote 14 hits over five years and performed seven of them herself. In 1974 she became the first woman to win a coveted Ivor Novello song writing award going on to win another the following year. An accomplished pianist, producer and arranger, her distinctive multi-tracked falsetto vocals were later favoured by the likes of Enya. Often seen as a precursor to Kate Bush".

Light is shed on de Paul's character in the book Everybody Died, So I Got a Dog, written by the writer and radio presenter, Emily Dean, who as a girl was fascinated by her neighbour and she recounts wise advice that de Paul gave her. Dean also mentioned de Paul in a magazine interview she gave for Saga. De Paul is also mentioned several times in Broken Greek, the evocative memoir by the music writer by Pete Paphides. She also features prominently in the biography of James Coburn, written by Coburn's daughter-in-law and based on material from tapes recorded by Coburn for an unfinished autobiography.

Esther Rantzen was quoted as saying: "Lynsey was a close friend and neighbour and we saw a lot of each other. She was beautiful and ageless; she looked 35 and was so gifted. She was a writer and composer but she was also very clever with words, very witty. Obviously she sang and played the piano, but she was also an artist, she painted as well. In fact, she could do everything. I called her Renaissance woman. She really was quite outstanding".

== Personal life ==
De Paul never married. She was romantically involved with Dudley Moore, Chas Chandler, Roy Wood, Ringo Starr, James Coburn, Bill Kenwright, Dodi Fayed, George Best, Bernie Taupin and David Frost, receiving five marriage proposals, including one from Chandler and another from Coburn. De Paul also had an affair with Sean Connery, which she later said she regretted. She said she was "horrified" after discovering comments Connery had made in interviews in which he had suggested it was acceptable to hit women. De Paul later stated that Connery's remarks and her upbringing with a violent father inspired her participation in campaigns to raise awareness against domestic violence. In his autobiography, George Best said that de Paul was "fiercely independent". In 1977, in an interview with music journalist Barry Cain that appeared in Record Mirror, de Paul prophetically said, "I guess I'll never get married. My first love will always be music."

Prince Charles was also quite taken with de Paul. The two met at a charity dinner party at The Ritz in Piccadilly. In his book Settling Down, James Whitaker, the Daily Mirror's royal editor, wrote, "Fellow guests that night sat entranced as the Prince grew more and more friendly towards Lynsey, clearly bowled over by the diminutive singer's looks and bubbly personality".

She was a patron of the Spike Milligan Statue Memorial Fund and was present for the unveiling of the statue in his honour on 4 September 2014; this was less than four weeks before her own death. She was also a friend of another ex-Goon, Michael Bentine, and a former neighbour of Michael Palin, who mentions her in his published diaries.

During the 1970s, de Paul bought a gothic style home, facing Highgate Cemetery East, in Holly Village, Highgate, before moving in the 1990s to a Victorian mansion in Hampstead, in North London. She named it "Moot Grange", an anagram of "No Mortgage", after also considering "Gnome Groat" and "No Meat/Grog", the latter because she was vegetarian and teetotal. Her home at the time of her death, was in Mill Hill, in North West London. De Paul was a long-time campaigner for animal rights and shared her house with a three-legged cat called Tripod.

Politically, de Paul was referred to as a supporter of the Conservative Party and appeared at the 1983 Conservative conference along with other celebrities where she sang a jingle she had composed for the event, even though earlier in her career she was more associated with the Liberal party.

She put her career on hold at the end of the 1990s until the end of 2001 to look after her ailing mother, who, until she died, was the company secretary for Lynsey de Paul Music Limited.

== Death and tributes ==
De Paul suffered a brain haemorrhage on the morning of 1 October 2014 at her home in Mill Hill and was later pronounced dead at Barnet General Hospital. Her niece told The Times that her death was "completely unexpected", adding: "She was a vegetarian, she didn't smoke, she didn't drink—she was amazing, in fact." She was interred with a humanist funeral at Hendon Cemetery.

Broadcaster and friend Esther Rantzen, for whose television series Hearts of Gold de Paul had written the theme, said: "She was a renaissance woman. She could do everything: she could sing, she could compose, she was an immensely talented artist. She became a huge star but she was also a loyal and generous friend. It's an absolutely tragic loss." Def Leppard singer Joe Elliott paid tribute to de Paul on his 4 October 2014 Planet Rock radio show, playing the album version of "Roll Away The Stone" by Mott the Hoople featuring de Paul's spoken vocals. Elliott described her as "a wonderful lady" and "a fantastic singer and songwriter". De Paul is listed on the official Grammy website under "remembering the music people we lost in 2014–15".

== Discography ==
- Surprise (1973)
- Taste Me... Don't Waste Me (1974)
- Love Bomb (1975)
- Tigers and Fireflies (1979)
- Before You Go Tonight (1990)
- Just a Little Time (1994)

== See also ==
- List of performers on Top of the Pops
- List of pop and rock pianists
- List of singer-songwriters
- Songs written by Lynsey de Paul
- The Ivors Academy
- List of music artists and bands from England
- United Kingdom in the Eurovision Song Contest
- Rear of the Year

Awards and achievements
| Preceded by Brotherhood of Man with "Save Your Kisses for Me" | UK in the Eurovision Song Contest; 1977 (with Mike Moran) | Succeeded by Co-Co with "The Bad Old Days" |
