= Ian Lynn =

British musician

Ian Stuart Lynn is a British musician and composer. He was performing in London's West End as a jazz pianist while still in his teens, and rose to prominence as a musician during the 1970s as the musical director for Barbara Dickson, Sheena Easton, Gerry Rafferty, and Leo Sayer.

Since then he has divided his efforts between writing scores for TV and film, and making documentary films, while also working with George Michael, Katrina and the Waves, Miriam Stockley and Elaine Paige.

Film credits have included Sweet Talker (Taylor Hackford), The Clandestine Marriage (Sir Nigel Hawthorne) and one of 2006's Royal Premiere films, These Foolish Things, starring Lauren Bacall, Anjelica Huston and Terence Stamp. In TV he has scored a wide range of programmes, from all the Great Railway Journeys series, to the TV feature film, Bravo Two Zero.

In the 1990s, he worked with Lynsey de Paul, co-composing the music on her "Taking Control" video as well as co-writing songs on her Just a Little Time album, and the children's album, Marcus The Mole.
