= Horea Crishan =

Horea Crishan (born 1945, Sibiu (former Austro-Hungarian city of Hermannstadt), Romania) fled his homeland in 1971 for Hamburg, Germany, where he became a violinist for the NDR Symphony Orchestra in Hamburg as well as a pan flautist. In 1979, together with organist Marcel Cellier, Crishan released his first pan flute album. It was followed by four more albums until he moved to the Polydor Records label with the release of two albums, The Magic Of The Pan Flute volume 1 in 1983, and The Magic Of The Pan Flute volume 2 in 1984. Notable singles released included a collaboration with James Last on "Paradiesvogel" / "Empty Glasses", and the British singer-songwriter Lynsey de Paul on "Air On A Heart String" / "Arrival of the Queen", with de Paul as the record producer.

His most recent release as a pan flautist was Pan's Concerto, which was released on the WEA label in 1991.
