= Hearts of Gold =

- Created by: Esther Rantzen
- Directed by: Robin Bextor; Malcolm Smith; Phil Chilvers (1990 Christmas special)
- Presented by: Esther Rantzen; Michael Groth (1988–1991); Mike Smith (1992–1993); Carol Smillie (1995–1996)
- Theme music composer: Lynsey de Paul
- Country of origin: United Kingdom
- Original language: English
- No. of series: 8
- No. of episodes: 49

Production
- Producers: Jane Elsdon-Dew; Nick Vaughan-Barratt; Bryher Scudamore; Richard Woolfe
- Running time: 30–60 minutes

Original release
- Network: BBC1
- Release: 29 October 1988 – 1 May 1996

Hearts of Gold is a BBC television programme devised and presented by Esther Rantzen, with Michael Groth, Mike Smith and Carol Smillie as co-presenters. Running for six years in the 1980s and 1990s, the programme commended members of the public for their good deeds.

Rantzen devised the show in 1988. The premise of the show was to commend those who had done good deeds to others. They would usually be tricked into appearing on the show using a practical joke, a device which some critics (such as The Independent's Geraldine Bedell) compared to Beadle's About. Journalist Bedell explains that participants "are inviegled into the studio under false pretences and presented with gold hearts on blue ribbons while they wonder where to put themselves. (There is also a sub-Beadle segment in which Esther and chums dress up as folk in distress and wait for passers-by to come to their aid)." For some of its life, the show was filmed at The Fountain Studios in Wembley.

== Transmission details ==
- Series 1: 29 October - 17 December 1988: 7 Episodes.
- Series 2: 28 October - 24 December 1989: 9 Episodes.
- Series 3: 14 October - 23 December 1990: 6 Episodes. (five normal episodes plus a Christmas special)
- Series 4: 6–20 December 1991: 3 Episodes
- Series 5: 4–18 December 1992: 3 Episodes
- Series 6: 5 October - 9 November 1993: 6 Episodes
- Series 7: 8 March - 26 April 1995 : 8 Episodes
- Series 8: 27 March - 1 May 1996 : 6 Episodes

== Theme song ==
The 1988 theme song was written by Lynsey de Paul and released as a single by Gold on the CBS record label in 1988. The B-side of the single was the song "Sacks of Gold", also a De Paul composition.
