= E.O.I.O. =

"E.O.I.O"

Single by Lynsey de Paul
- Written: Lynsey de Paul

"E.O.I.O" (a.k.a. "Eeo-Eio" and "Io... Aio") is a song written by Lynsey de Paul (credited as Rubin) and Edward Adamberry, and published by Chappell. It was originally released as a single by the group the Beads, on the Decca label in October 1971. This was one of the earliest records produced by Peter Collins; he also wrote the B-side "Sweetie Peetie". The single was released in the UK and most territories in Europe, as well as Turkey (with a picture sleeve) and Lebanon.

The actor and singer Jack Wild recorded his version of "E.O.I.O.", produced by Biddu, for his 1972 album A Beautiful World. It was released on Buddah Records in the US and received positive reviews from Billboard and "High Fidelity Magazine". Although the vinyl album version lists the song as "E.O.I.O.", the eight-track cartridge release lists the song as "Eeo-Eio" and features it twice. The song also appeared as a track on his 1972 Japanese album, Punch And Judy. Writing for "Do You Remember", Dana Daly mentions "E.O.I.O." as the stand out track from Beautiful World album. The song is still played on American radio.

A version of the song with Italian lyrics by Dino Sarti called "Io... Aio" was also released by the Italian group, Domodossola (also known as "I Domodossola"), a vocal and instrumental ensemble named after their birthplace, on their first album D... Come Domodossola in November 1971. The album is listed in the "Discogrefia nazionale della canzone Italiana" (the Italian National Discography of Songs). The group was championed by Italian singer Mina and the album was released on her PDU record label (distributed by EMI).
