= Papa Do =

"Papa Do" is a song written by Lynsey de Paul and Barry Blue, who are credited as Rubin and Green. The song was released as a single performed by Barry Green (a.k.a. Blue) in February 1972, backed with "Boomerang" on the Decca label (both songs credited as written by Rubin and Green respectively), and had a modicum of chart success in Spain, France (where it reached number 68 on 11 May 1972) and Sweden, where it reached number 11 on the Tio i Topp chart.

It received a number of favourable reviews, including one from the BBC DJ Alan Freeman on his Sunday radio show Pick of the Pops and adverts for the song appeared in the music press. The Dutch group, Cardinal Point, recorded a version which was similar in style to that recorded by Green, as a track on their self-named album, and the Greek group, The Daltons, also released a version of the song as a single on the PanVox record label.

Another version of the song, re-titled as "Mama Do" with slightly modified lyrics and in a jazzed up style was recorded and released by de Paul as the opening track for her demo album as well as becoming the lead track on her debut album, Surprise, which was released in 1973.

In January 1974, Decca Records re-released the single to capitalize on Barry Blue's chart success at the time on Bell Records and the song made the Hessen charts in Germany. Again, the re-released single received positive reviews from the music press. The song is still played on various European radio stations, such as on "Radio Topo", as well as in the United States.

The B-side "Boomerang" was released as a single by dance ensemble The Young Generation on the RCA label in 1972 as well as by Jane and Julie on the Barclay label. Both releases credited the songwriting to B. Green and L. de Paul. "Boomerang" was also covered by Geno Washington & the Ram Jam Band in 1972 but this version was not released until 1998.

== CD releases ==
Barry Green's version of the song appeared on compact disc on the compilation album The Electric Asylum, Vol. 5: Rare British Freakrock in 2010. The Dalton's version was included on a various artists compilation CD in 2008. Cardinal Point's version was released on the various artist compilation CD Cut Loose (More Junk Shop Glam!). The version by Geno Washington & The Ram Jam Band was released in 1998 and again in 2016. De Paul's version of "Mama Do" has also been released on CD.
