= Hi Summer =

British television series

Hi Summer is a British television variety show made by London Weekend Television and shown on UK television in 1977 by ITV, the oldest commercial network in the UK. A total of eight episodes were made and featured a cast that included Leslie Crowther, Lena Zavaroni, Carl Wayne, Pearly Gates, Anna Dawson, Derek Griffiths, Chris Quinten and Stephanie Lawrence. This travelling variety show featured sketches, topical comedy and musical numbers that were recorded both in studio and on location (Stratford upon Avon, Crystal Palace, Knebworth House among others). The theme tune was composed by Lynsey de Paul, and sung by Carl Wayne and was released as a single in 1977 as well as later that year on the album TV Themes (A Selection Of Top Television Series). De Paul's theme was later re-used on commercials for TV Times.
