= Water (Lynsey de Paul song) =

Song by Lynsey de Paul and Barry Blue

from the album Surprise
- Released: 9 March 1973
- Studio: Audio International, London, UK
- Genre: Singer-songwriter; Pop
- Length: 4:10
- Label: MAM
- Songwriters: Lynsey de Paul; Barry Blue
- Producer: Lynsey de Paul

"Water" is a song written by the British female singer-songwriter Lynsey de Paul and Barry Blue, who was credited as Barry Green. It was first released as a track on De Paul's debut album Surprise in March 1973. Shortly afterwards, a live version that de Paul recorded for the BBC, appearing on the BBC Transcription Services album number 443 in April 1973. It was released as a single later that year in Peru (and possibly other South American countries) with the title "Agua", where it reach No.16 on the singles chart, but the song was not released as a single in Europe, Japan and the United States. It has since appeared on a number of de Paul compilation albums such as Greatest Hits, The Best of Lynsey de Paul and the Sugar and Beyond anthology.

"Water" was covered by the Japanese singer Nickey, on her 2013 album, A Taste of Honey and it was also included on her All Time Best 1985–2013 CD. The song has also been sampled by other artists, such as by Smoove & Turrell, who used the backing track to "Water" on their single "You Don't Know", which was released on 13 April 2009. When de Paul heard "You Don't Know" she loved how they had used her music and personally intervened with her record company and publishers to make sure the licensing deal happened. De Paul and Blue also received co-writing credits on "You Don't Know". As well as being released as a CD single with various remixes, it was included as a track on the Smoove & Turrell album, Antique Soul, and their 2019 compilation double album, Solid Brass: Ten Years Of Northern Funk.

The song, with de Paul's original vocal repeating the title, was also used as a backing track for the rap "Water" by British rap artist Twiggz on his 2018 release. This version was credited to Twiggz, featuring Lynsey de Paul.
