= You Give Me Those Feelings =

"You Give Me Those Feelings" is a song written by Lynsey de Paul, and produced by de Paul and Jon Kelly. It was released as a non-album single, with the B-side "Beautiful" also composed by de Paul, on Polydor in August 1977, as the follow-up to the European hit single "Rock Bottom". The German and French releases of the single both had picture sleeves. The romantic song makes clever use of vocal overdubbing and has a false ending making the shorter version more radio friendly that the whole song, which clocks in at over four minutes. The song was well received by the press, with the Daily Mirror writing "Lynsey de Paul has written a slow, beautiful song, ideally suited to her voice", and the record was play listed by a number of British radio stations. It also was popular in some European countries, and is listed as one of the songs of 1977 in a German music database "Musik des Jahres 1977".

A cover version of "You Give Me Those Feelings" was recorded by Gracie Rivera, a Filipina singer based in Hong Kong. Rivera's version appeared on her third album, Grace Anne Rivera, released by EMI (Hong Kong) in 1978.

Originally released as a stand-alone single, de Paul's original recording was more recently released for the first time on CD as a track on her 2013 anthology album Into My Music. A different, updated, recording of B-side song "Beautiful" was also included on the anthology CD. "You Give Me Those Feelings" still receives radio plays, most recently (7 November 2016) on CXCU Night Trax hosted by Professor Mike.
