= Won't Somebody Dance with Me =

1973 single by Lynsey de Paul

Single by Lynsey de Paul
- B-side: "So Good to You"
- Released: 1973
- Genre: Europop
- Length: 3:31
- Label: MAM Records
- Songwriter(s): Lynsey de Paul
- Producer(s): Lynsey de Paul

Lynsey de Paul singles chronology
| "All Night" (1973) | "Won't Somebody Dance with Me" (1973) | "Ooh I Do" (1974) |

"Won't Somebody Dance with Me" is a song written by Lynsey de Paul in 1973, which was awarded an Ivor Novello Award in 1974. Her original version of the ballad made the top 20 of the UK, Irish and Dutch charts, and the song was featured in Michael Winner's remake of the film The Big Sleep, The Muppet Show, and the 1970s version of the New Mickey Mouse Club (performed on that show by Lisa Whelchel).

== History ==
This autobiographical song, inspired by an event from de Paul's teenage years, included some spoken dialogue by a male voice; on the original single it was by the BBC Radio 1 DJ Ed Stewart. It was her last single released on the MAM Records label. The recording was produced by de Paul and the strings were arranged by Christopher Gunning. It received positive reviews from the music press with favourable reviews from the likes of John Peel and British music critic Ian MacDonald of the NME writing "a perfect pop record and a certain smash hit". US music industry magazines also praised the song, with Cash Box magazine listing it under its "Pick for the Week" section and stating "Her tender vocal, when coupled with a perfectly fitting string section, gives this one greater hit potential than any disk she has had released since her tremendous "Sugar Me" a year ago". "Record World" gave the release a recommendation in its "Spins and Sales" listing.

The single reached number 14 on the UK Singles Chart in November 1973, where it spent seven weeks on the chart, number 9 on the Irish Singles Chart, number 4 on the Israeli chart, number 17 on the Netherlands singles chart, and number 3 on the Radio Northsea International Top 30. It also spent two weeks on the Swedish "Tio I topp" charts, peaking at number 20. The song was re-released as the B-side to "Sugar Me" on the MAM record label in 1977, presumably to tie in with de Paul's "Rock Bottom" which was her entry for that year's Eurovision Song Contest and was in the UK Singles Chart at the same time.

== Chart performance ==
| Chart (1973) | Peak position |
|---|---|
| Israel | 4 |
| Ireland | 9 |
| Netherlands | 17 |
| UK | 14 |

== Other recordings ==
An alternative recording of the song by de Paul was featured as the second track on the album The Wicked Die Young. It was compiled by the film director Nicolas Winding Refn and chosen as one of songs that inspired his horror film The Neon Demon. Rob Wacey reviewed the album for AllMusic and rated the track as one of the highlights of the album. De Paul also re-recorded the song for her 1994 CD album, Just a Little Time. This version reflected maturity and featured additional text about waiting for love and destiny, with strings being replaced by a saxophone.

The track has been covered by Bruce Johnston, Petula Clark, Alan Tew Orchestra, Sounds Orchestral, Peter North (aka Piet Noordijk), Jeannie, Denis King, Lena Zavaroni, Tina Charles (singer) and S. Sebber. A French version ("Je voudrais tant danser") with lyrics by Charles Level was recorded by Martine Tourreil featuring male vocals by Sacha Distel. Tourreil performed the song with Distel on his television show on 12 November 1977. A Danish version "Hvem danser en dans med mig" was released by Maria Stenz with Jesper Klein in 1974 and reached number 8 in the official Danish hit list chart. A comedic version with different lyrics was released by George Jones and Tommy Thomas on their 1982 album, Up Ulster.
