= Martian Man =

Song by Lynsey de Paul

"Martian Man" is a song written by Lynsey de Paul that was destined to be a track on her 1976 album Before You Go Tonight (aka Take Your Time), but was shelved as part of a legal dispute with former manager Don Arden.

Although the dispute was solved in de Paul's favour, the album was first released in 1990, in Japan, as well as on a Best of.. CD (albeit as "My Martian Man") that was released in 1993. "Martian Man" finally appeared internationally as a track on de Paul's 2013 anthology CD, Into My Music: 1975-1979. De Paul explained that the ethereal song is about former boyfriend and zany musician Roy Wood, hence the strange lyrics about a woman who falls in love with a stranded Martian. "He came to collect me at my flat and he's dyed his hair green - I thought he looked like a Martian", she said in the booklet to her Into My Music album. Ironically, it was Wood who had recommended Don Arden as her new manager when she left MAM Records.

In 1996, the ex-All About Eve singer and longterm de Paul fan, Julianne Regan, released an electronic version of the song that was approved by de Paul, as a track on the extended play CD The Milkman by Regan's group, Mice. Released on 22 April 1996 on Permanent records, it reached No. 92 on the UK Singles Chart in May that year. This recording of the song was also included on the 2001 Julianne Regan and Mice CD album, New and Improved on Jamtart Records.
