= On the Ride (You Do It Once, You Do It Twice) =

Song by Continental Uptight Band
- A-side: "On the Ride (You Do It Once, You Do It Twice)"
- B-side: "Northern Islands"
- Released: 1972
- Label: Imperial 5C 006-24486
- Composers: E. Adamberry, L. Rubin

"On the Ride (You Do It Once, You Do It Twice)" is a song written by Lynsey de Paul (credited as Rubin) and Edward Adamberry that has become a chart hit for three different artists in three different countries, as well as cover versions being released by at least another three artists/groups.

== Chart hit versions ==
It was first recorded and released as a single in January 1972 by the Dutch musical ensemble, Continental Uptight Band. The single was a chart hit in the Netherlands, reaching No. 23 in March 1972. It also reached No. 21 on the Radio Northsea International Prediction Hit 40 listing on 4 March 1972 after being a Smash Play on the radio station a month earlier. The single was also released in most territories of the world including the UK, US, Germany, Spain, Turkey, Brazil and Argentina, with "Northern Islands" being the B-side on all of these releases. A promotional film of the group was shown on the Austrian TV (ORF (broadcaster)) music show Spotlight on 25 June 1972 singing the song while driving through the streets of Utrecht in an old timer car. The song was released on CD in 2002 on Top 40 hitdossier : collectables 70's and, in 2005, on compilation albums in the Nederpop series.

Another version of the song with the title "You Do It Once, You Do It Twice" was released by Family Robinson on the Singaporean record label Libra in 1972. This version reached No. 1 on the Malaysian singles chart in February 1973. and was also one of the tracks on the EP "Magnificent Song Hit". It was also a track on the 1973 compilation albums Hits Of Right Now and Top Hits of 1973. The Family Robinson Band are seen performing "You Do It Once, You Do It Twice" somewhat incongruously, in a nightclub at the beginning of the 1975 horror film, Pontianak.

Swedish singer Dick Zetterlund & Sweet Wine released a version as a single on the Philips label in 1974, albeit with the title "On The Ride (I Do It Once I Do It Twice)" This version of the song reached No. 20 on the Tio I topp chart on the 9 March 1974.

== Other recorded cover versions ==
A German language version of the song entitled "So Knall Auf Fall", with German lyrics by Günther Behrle, was also released by singer and actress Elke Sommer as her final single in 1972, and this also appeared on a compilation album that year. The French language version was released as a single in 1973 by Virus, a French rock group founded by Jean-Claude Deseure (vocalist and songwriter) and Jacques Villette (guitarist). It was entitled "Le Temps De Vivre" ("The Time to Live") with French lyrics provided by the band's singer, Jean-Claude Deseure.

Indonesian born, Singapore based singer Ervinna, famous throughout Asia in the 1970s for her cover versions of western pop songs, also recorded a Chinese (Mandarin) version of "On the Ride (You Do It Once, You Do It Twice)" with the title "人生最可愛" on her 1973 album 山地多情花, and this version also appeared on the EP "我走在風雨中".
