= Don't You Remember When =

Single by Vera Lynn
- B-side: "That Old Feeling"
- Released: February 20, 1976
- Recorded: Marquee Studios, London
- Label: EMI
- Songwriters: Lynsey de Paul and Barry Blue
- Producer: Lynsey de Paul

"Don't You Remember When" (also known as "Don't You Remember") is a song written by Lynsey de Paul and Barry Blue, that was released as a single by Vera Lynn on 20 February 1976 on the EMI record label, in the UK as well as in Europe. The song was recorded at the Marquee Studios, London and was produced by de Paul and she also sang backing vocals on the track. In an interview with Tony Robinson of the Sunday Mirror at the time, De Paul said "I was absolutely thrilled at working with Dame Vera". Ringo Starr, who was de Paul's partner at the time, was widely reported as playing the tambourine on the song, with Lynn recently recalling this in a 2019 interview in Saga Magazine. The music collectors magazine "Goldmine" listed it as one of Starr's 5 greatest session performances. De Paul also produced the B-side of the single, "That Old Feeling", written by Lew Brown and Sammy Fain. The English keyboard player, pianist and composer Tony Hymas, who had worked with de Paul before on her Love Bomb album and who went on to be a member of the duo Ph.D., arranged the song. The song received favourable reviews, with the Record Mirror writing that the song is "a perfect vehicle for her with a well-honed nostalgic lyrics and lots of big long notes". Lynn performed the song on her own BBC One TV show.

De Paul was interviewed about how she wrote the song with Barry Blue especially for Vera Lynn, after appearing on Lynn's TV show, as well as details about its recording in an article in the UK music magazine, Music Week. Lynn and de Paul held a press reception at the Dorchester Hotel in February 1976 to announce the release of the single. The two ladies had also met previously at the Dorchester Hotel when they were both recipients of Ivor Novello Awards on 22 May 1975; de Paul receiving the Best Television Theme award for the song "No, Honestly", and Lynn receiving a special award for services to the music industry. Later that year, de Paul appeared on The Vera Lynn Show on BBC One, leading to Lynn asking de Paul if she had a suitable song for her as a single.

The song appeared on CD for the first time in 2007 as a remastered track (with the shortened title "Don't You Remember") on the Vera Lynn compilation album, The Singles Collection, that was released worldwide to coincide for her 90th birthday on the EMI Gold record label and on Parlophone in digital download format. The extensive sleeve notes for the CD states "The last tracks not to appear on an album were issued in the same year and really are the diamonds among the collected pearls on this collection. Singer-songwriter Lynsey de Paul wrote the song "Don't You Remember"... This was backed by yet another Sammy Fain classic "That Old Feeling"". The French music site Purebreak charts mentions the song and album as of Lynn's most important releases. It was also released again on 8 May 2020 on the album, We'll Meet Again (VE Day 75 Edition), by the Warner Music Group - X5 Music Group. The German radio station, Radio Rund Hamm, listed its release on its pop history site. The recording was also released on the CD Beatles Undercover Volume Ten.

Lynn was interviewed by Saga magazine in 2019 and mentioned recording "Don't You Remember When". A more recent article also recalled the connection between Lynn, de Paul and Starr in the recording of the song and states "Decades after she became the darling of the troops', Dame Lynn returned with a comeback single. "Don't You Remember When" was well received by music critics when it was released in 1976", which was echoed by Bill Moeller in his article "How That Nightingale Could Sing!". When Lynn died in June 2020, several press obituaries mentioned the song. It was included on the We'll Meet Again (VE Day 75 Edition) album in 2020 and it reached No. 55 in the UK Albums Chart. It is mentioned in an interview with Lynn's daughter "Vera Lynn's songs, daughter and early life as We’ll Meet Again singer dies aged 103" by Aidan Milan that was featured in the British newspaper Metro, as well as "a come back hit in 1976" by The New York Post, the Los Angeles Times and Ian Robertson in his "Pot Pourri" column in Canadian Stamp News. It is also mentioned in the June 2020 article "Paul McCartney pays tribute to Vera Lynn - and she sings Beatles songs" on The Beatles Journal site. The de Paul produced B-side "That Old Feeling" is also listed among Lynn's top 100 songs.

In more recent years, the song has become popular at funerals and memorials due to the reminiscing tone and nostalgia of the lyrics.
