= Sugar Me =

Single by Lynsey de Paul
- B-side: "Storm in a Teacup"
- Released: 1972
- Venue: Studio One AIR Studios, Oxford Circus, London
- Genre: Pop
- Label: MAM Records
- Songwriters: Lynsey de Paul and Barry Green

Official audio
- "Sugar Me" on YouTube

"Sugar Me" is a song written by Lynsey de Paul and Barry Green. The first version of this song to be released was recorded by de Paul as her first single on MAM Records in 1972. It was produced by Gordon Mills and the B-side was de Paul's version of "Storm in a Teacup", a song she had co-written and had been a hit for the Fortunes earlier that year.

== Background and reception ==
The single was a hit in many countries, notably reaching the top of the singles chart in the Netherlands (where it stayed for five weeks), Belgium, Sweden and Spain. It reached the top 20 in the UK (peaking at number 5), Australia, Germany, Austria, Denmark and Japan. The song also reached the number 1 position on the Bangkok HSA chart in October 1972, and was play listed on some (WERS-FM, KCRW, KFAI, WPKN etc) US radio stations. It also received favourable reviews in the United States, and was listed as being among the best 5 singles of 1972 by Cashbox. It also reached number 10 in India, as reported by the Junior Statesman magazine otherwise known as the JS.

"Sugar Me" was ranked the 14th best-selling single of 1972 in the Netherlands, the 40th best seller the same year in Australia, the 80th best-selling single of 1972 in the UK, and the 89th best-selling single on the 1973 German chart. Two of the Cashbox editorial staff (Robert Adels and Mark Pines) listed the song as one of their favourite singles of 1972. "Sugar Me" entered the Netherlands Digital Top 100 on the 5 October 2014, just after De Paul died. The version on de Paul's debut album, Surprise, was a re-recorded and slightly extended version that featured a longer solo by violinist Johnny Van Derek and was produced by de Paul. "Sugar Me" was re-released as a single in 1977 backed with "Won't Somebody Dance With Me" on the MAM label to tie in with the release of her Eurovision Song contest entry "Rock Bottom".

De Paul re-recorded the song in an updated style including a club mix version of the song and both versions appeared on her 1994 album, Just a Little Time. A 12 inch white label version of the song credited to Dj Baz & Lynsey De Paul was also released in 1994. This club mix was also included on the 2001 compilation album, Dance Sensation (The Ultimate Urban Dance Remix Collection) as well as on Oldie Club Classics released in 2002 and the 2008 compilation "Dance Megamixes".

In 2026, "Sugar Me" was one of the tracks on the compilation album "Now Yearbook '72" that reached #1 on the U.K. official compilation album charts.

== Chart performance ==
Chart (1972/73)	Peak position
Argentina	71
Belgium	1
Netherlands	1
Spain	1
Sweden	1
Austria	2
Australia	4
UK	5
Singapore	7
Turkey	9
Germany	16

== Other versions ==
The song has been recorded by many other artists, notably Nancy Sinatra, as a non-LP single, and received positive reviews. This version appeared as the lead track on her 1999 album How Does It Feel and on her 2023 album Keep Walkin': Singles, Demos & Rarities 1965-1978. Claudine Longet also recorded her version of the song on her 1993 album Sugar Me. The song was also covered by actress Abigail on her 1973 self-titled album. Later it was covered by Dutch group Gigantjes, Belgian female trio Candy, Nydia Caro (both as a single and also as a track on her 1978 album), Esmaye on her album Elements in Me, plus singer-songwriter Nasia Christie who released her version of "Sugar Me" as her first single produced by Brian Canham from Pseudo Echo in 2007. There has also been a rock version of the song performed by the German group Gwen Stacey, on their 1989 EP "Sugar Me". More recently, it has been recorded by Papernut Cambridge, Italian artist, LIM, Karl Jonas on his 2016 album, In a Gilbert Play, and most recently by "The Lickerish Quartet" as a track on their 2022 album Fables from Fearless Heights, that made number 35 on the Weekly Best Selling Albums chart in Japan on 24 July 2022.

In 1973, Klaus Wunderlich performed an instrumental version of "Sugar Me" as a medley with "Standing in the Road", originally by Blackfoot Sue. This version was sampled for the song "Certified" by Guru on his 2000 album Guru's Jazzmatazz, Vol. 3: Streetsoul, featuring Bilal on vocals and de Paul received co-writing credits. Guru's Jazzmatazz, Vol. 3: Streetsoul reached #24 on the CMJ New Music Report charts and #3 on their Hip Hop chart as well as making the album charts in most European countries. The track was also released as a single with various remixes. This version of the song also appeared on the album Rap History 2000 and also on the 2007 CD Sound Maeuvers by DJ Mitsu The Beats, DJ Mu-R, where it is entitled "Certified/Sugar Me", and the 2010 CD Wolt Beats – My Brain Dilla's Anthology, as well as on the 2016 CD Mr.Beats a.k.a. DJ Celory J Dilla Mix Pt. 2.

== Film and television soundtrack use ==
The de Paul album version of "Sugar Me" is featured as the first song in the movie Cut Snake, and it is performed by Austrian actress Sophie Rois in the German comedy film La série" aka "Fräulein Phyllis. It was also featured in the 1980 Russian movie Тростинка на ветру (Reed in the Wind). It was also featured in episode 1 of the 2021 TV series Physical. The version by Claudine Longet appears on the sound track to the 2019 German film, Club der einsamen Herzen (Lonely Hearts Club). The original version of "Sugar Me" is used as the opening music for the Canadian film Dad, released in 2019 and the character Deborah (played by Masa Lizdek) sings the song in the movie.
