= Miss Hit and Run =

Song written by Lynsey de Paul and Barry Blue

"Miss Hit and Run" is a song written by Lynsey de Paul and Barry Blue. Blue released the single in 1974 as a follow-up single to "School Love" on Bell Records in the UK, Germany, Italy and Spain and on the Barclay label in France and recorded it with a "Beach Boys" type of arrangement. Indeed, the Liverpool Echo wrote "Barry Blue could easily have a case of mistaken identity on his hands this week - for on his new release "Miss Hit And Run" he sounds more like the "Beach Boys" than they do themselves". The single sided acetate label of the single reveals that the original title was "Little Miss Hit and Run", confirming what was reported in the music press at the time. The song was Blue's fourth consecutive hit, reaching number 26 on the official UK Singles Chart in August 1974. It also reached number 9 on Capitol Radio's "Capitol Countdown" chart, number 24 on the Melody Maker singles chart and it spent three weeks on the Dutch Tipparade. In some UK regional charts based on sales (such as the HMV store in Birmingham), it reached the Top 20 The original single version of the song performed by Blue was also a track on the K-Tel album, Music Explosion, Music Power (which reached No. 1 on the Austrian and German albums charts) and the Polydor album, 20 Super Power Hits.

Notable TV performances of the song included appearances on 10 August 1974 on TopPop, the Dutch pop music program as well as Lift Off with Ayshea (Episode 124) on 22 July 1974 and the BBC programme Top of the Pops. "Miss Hit and Run" was re-released by Blue as the B-side to "Do You Wanna Dance" in 1980. The song has been released on a number of Barry Blue compilation CDs such as The Singles Collection, Dancin' (On A Saturday Night)... Best Of. and most recently Out of the Blue - 50 Years of Discovery (2021).

== Weekly charts ==
Weekly chart performance for "Miss Hit and Run"
Chart (1974)	Peak position
UK Singles (OCC)	26
