= Brian Mackenzie, Baron Mackenzie of Framwellgate =

British peer (born 1943)

The Right Honourable The Lord Mackenzie of Framwellgate OBE
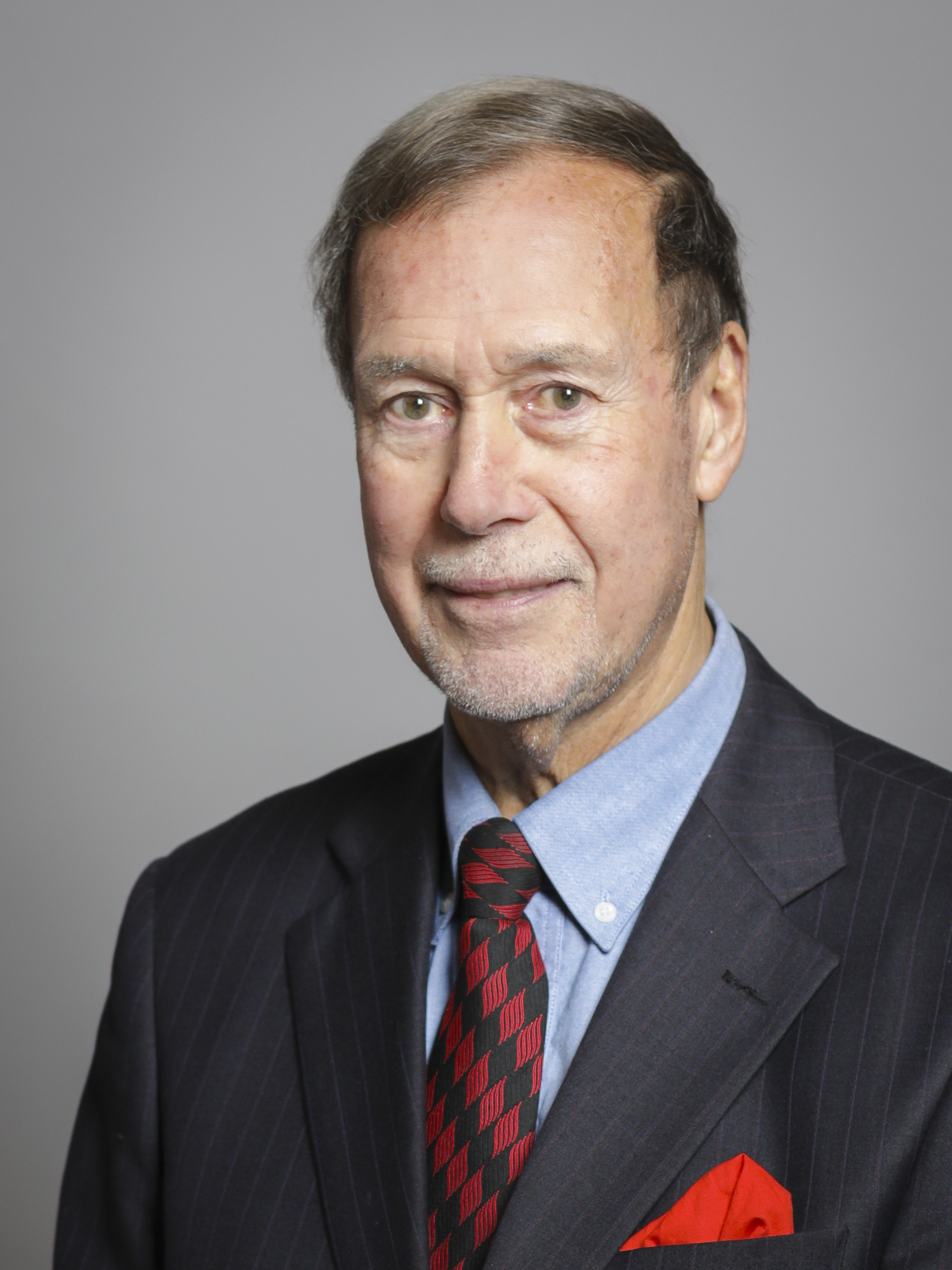
- Official portrait, 2019

Member of the House of Lords
- Lord Temporal
- Life peerage 17 July 1998

Personal details
- Born: Brian Mackenzie; 21 March 1943 (age 83) Darlington, Durham; United Kingdom
- Party: Non-affiliated (since 2013)
- Other political affiliations: Labour (1998–2013)
- Education: University of London
- Occupation: Politician
- Profession: Law enforcement

Brian Mackenzie, Baron Mackenzie of Framwellgate, OBE (born 21 March 1943), is a British life peer and former police officer. He now sits in the House of Lords as a non-affiliated member, having formerly been a Labour Party peer. He is the former President of the Police Superintendents' Association.

== Early life ==
Mackenzie was born in Darlington and educated at Eastbourne Boys School. After joining the police studied law at the University of London.

== Career ==
Mackenzie rose through the ranks of the police service, becoming a Superintendent upon secondment to the Home Office and later becoming Chief Superintendent in the Durham Constabulary. A graduate of the FBI Academy at Quantico, Virginia, he was active in the Police Superintendents' Association and was its President for three years.

== Politics ==
In 1998, Mackenzie was raised to the Peerage as Baron Mackenzie of Framwellgate, of Durham in the County of Durham. In the House of Lords, Mackenzie has been most active in speaking on issues relating to crime and policing issues and retains personal interests in business ethics and sustainability. He published his memoir, "Two Lives of Brian – from Policing to Politics" in 2004. [Published by The Memoir Club]

=== Investigation into "paid advocacy" and suspension ===
In June 2013, following investigations by undercover reporters from the Sunday Times, The Telegraph, and the BBC, in which he was filmed offering to become a paid advocate for a firm pushing for new laws to benefit its business. He also said he could set up an all-party parliamentary group as a lobbying vehicle. When the videos came out Baron Mackenzie was suspended from the Labour Party. An investigation by the House of Lords Commissioner for Standards and subsequent appeal heard by the Lords Committee for Privileges and Conduct published on 9 December 2013 resulted in a six-month suspension from the House of Lords.

Since 3 July 2013, he has sat in the House of Lords as a non-affiliated member.

== Honours and awards ==
Mackenzie held the historical and honorary appointment of Billet Master of the City of Durham between 1989 and 2003. He was made an Honorary Member of the Rotary Club of Chester-le-Street in 2001. He was appointed OBE in the 1998 New Year Honours for services to the Police Service and the Police Superintendents' Association of England and Wales.

Coat of arms of Brian Mackenzie, Baron Mackenzie of Framwellgate
| Crest A prairie dog sejant erect Azure supporting with the forepaws a truncheon Or. Escutcheon Azure a cross voided throughout Or the angles thereof enfiling the inner cuff of four handcuffs in saltire Argent. Supporters On either side a great crested newt Or semy of roundels Azure. Motto Firmitas Lepos Constantia |

Orders of precedence in the United Kingdom
| Preceded by The Lord Butler of Brockwell | Gentlemen; Baron Mackenzie of Framwellgate | Followed by The Lord Clement-Jones |
