= Central Park Arrest =

1974 Thunderthighs song composed by Lynsey de Paul

"Central Park Arrest" is a song composed by Lynsey de Paul for the vocal trio Thunderthighs, and told the story of a policewoman apprehending a flasher in New York's Central Park. This song in the style of TV cop theme tunes of the day featured police sirens wailing, shots being fired and megaphone radio. The recording was produced by Steve Rowland (who got de Paul to write the song specifically for the trio) with a musical score by British composer, arranger and conductor, John Cameron. According to "Beat Instrumental", de Paul also played the piano on the recording.

The song was a top 30 hit in the UK Singles Chart It also reached number 3 on the Radio Northsea Toppers chart and number 2 on the Swedish Poporama chart. The record was a forecast hit on the New Zealand Pop-o-Meter chart and listed in the German Hessen chart. A short film was also produced by the German film director Reinhard Bock. It was written by Bock and featured footage of the trio travelling to Rockfield Studios in the Wye Valley, Monmouthshire, Wales (where, a few months later, Queen recorded "Bohemian Rhapsody").

The release garnered good reviews in the music press, with Record World choosing it as a single pick and saying "Do-do-do ladies from Lou Reed's "Walk on the Wild Side" do their own hit shopping'". The New Musical Express listed it as one of the best songs in 1974 in their year end review. It was released as a track on the compilation album, Dancing On A Saturday Night, Vol. 2, on Philips Records. The recording was released on CD in 1994 on World Hits 1974, a German compilation CD album as well as on Tower Of Strength. In 2009, it was included in the five CD box set 100 Hits Collection 70's.

The song's writer recorded and released her own version on the B-side to the hit single "No, Honestly" a few months later, as a lighter bongo driven song with de Paul as the producer. More recently, de Paul's version appeared on her anthology album, Into my Music. It is still played on the radio in the US, New Zealand, and the UK. It is listed in the U.S. Catalog of Copyright, Library of Congress and has been mentioned in a number of books on 1970s pop/rock.
