= So Good to You =

1973 song by Zakatek

"So Good to You" is a song that was written by Lynsey de Paul, and first released by Zakatek (aka Lenny Zakatek) as the B-side to his 1973 single, "I Gotcha Now", which also penned by de Paul. The single was released on 2 March 1973 and both songs were produced and arranged by de Paul. Her own version appeared in October 1973 as the B-side to her award-winning single "Won't Somebody Dance with Me", which was arranged by Christopher Gunning and produced by de Paul. In Japan and some South American countries, however, "So Good to You" was released as the A-side of the single release with "Won't Somebody Dance with Me" being relegated to the B-side on its release in 1974. AllMusic lists "So Good to You" as one of De Paul's song highlights. It was also a radio hit in Italy and ranks as one of de Paul's biggest songs there according to Radiocorriere magazine. It is still played on radio stations around the world.

De Paul's version appeared for the first time on CD in 1996 on the album Greatest Hits, and in 2000 on the Best of the 70's compilation album, and later as a remastered track on the CD compilation Sugar & Beyond: Anthology 1972-1974. It was also a track on the Brazilian CD compilation album, 70's Celebration - Greatest Hits of the 70's.
