= Getting a Drag =

Second single released by Lynsey de Paul

"Getting a Drag" was the second single released by Lynsey de Paul. The song was co-written with New Zealand born musician David Jordan and featured the de Paul penned b-side "Brandy".

Released in November 1972 on MAM Records, the single entered the UK Singles Chart and peaked at number 18 and was still in the charts in early 1973. The single also reached number 46 on the German Singles Chart and had a four week run on the Dutch Single Tip chart where it peaked at number 7. It reached number 1 on the Israeli Galei Tzahal chart, No. 2 for two weeks on the Radio Northsea International chart, No. 12 in January 1973 on the Turkish singles chart as published in Milliyet, and No. 19 on the Swedish Poporama charts. The song had a 6 week chart run on the Radio Luxembourg charts, peaking at No. 16.

== Chart performance ==
Chart (1973)	Peak position
Israel	1
Turkey	12
UK	18
Germany	46

Reviews for the single from the music were positive, with the American magazine, Record World, writing "Ms De Paul, who scored quite a hit in England with "Sugar Me", returns with a "Lola" like story of sexual identity confusion. The rocking beat and expertly produced by Gordon Mills keeps this clever song a winner. Commenting on her song, De Paul later said "This was my comment on the times and is about a girl who finds her boyfriend wearing her clothes and is angry, not because he is wearing them, but because he looks better than she does. It was tongue-in-cheek. I did it on Top Of The Pops when Marc Bolan was on set and was waiting to perform his song immediately afterwards". In his article "'Children of the Revolution': Glam Rock and the 70s" published in the New Socialist, Toby Manning wrote "'Getting a Drag' cleverly using gender performativity to queer gender roles (“I thought you were a brother but you turned out like my mother”)". The song appeared on the 2023 LP album Queer Sounds La Musique De Genres.

== Cover versions ==
The song has also been covered by Franz Lambert, Excelsior on the album Música Em Sua Vida, and most recently by a group named Grease Jar. A Japanese language version by Kuko & Angels was released as their debut single in 1973. The B-side was also covered by Miki Asakura with new lyrics as "Friday Night" on her 1981 album Sexy Elegance. In 1994, De Paul released a re-recorded and radically different version of the song on her Just a Little Time CD, as well as a remixed club version of the updated song.

== Awards ==
De Paul's performance of "Getting a Drag" was a prize winning song at the second International Contest of the Tokyo Music Festival in 1973. The song title was translated as "Sigh of Love" and De Paul was presented with the top singer performer award. She was competing against other international artists such as Olivia Newton-John, Paul Williams, Lauren Copley and Mickey Newbury.

== Mentions in books ==
The song is mentioned in a number of published books, such as In Perfect Harmony Singalong Pop in '70s Britain, by Will Hodgkinson and Mixing Pop and Politics: A Marxist History of Popular Music.
