= Just a Little Time =

Studio album by Lynsey de Paul
- Released: 30 September 1994
- Label: Music Deluxe

Lynsey de Paul chronology
Lynsey de Paul (1994)	Just a Little Time (1994)	Best of the 70s – Lynsey de Paul (2000)

Just a Little Time is an album by Lynsey de Paul. It was originally released on 30 September 1994 on the Music Deluxe (catalogue number MSCD9) label but has since been released on the Tring International PLC label (catalogue number JHD128) and on Arc Records/The Magic Collection (Catalogue number MEC 949080). All of the songs on the album are written or co-written by de Paul.

== Songs ==
The songs "Sugar Me", Getting a Drag", "Storm in a Teacup and "Dancing on a Saturday Night" are radical re-recordings of her earlier hits performed in an updated and uptempo fashion. "Won't Somebody Dance with Me" is still performed as a ballad, but has been updated and extended with an extra refrain. Never before released songs on the album include the ballads "Words Don't Mean a Thing" co-written with Scott English and title track "Just a Little Time" co-written with Gerard Kenny which are both about personal relationships as well as the more uptempo songs "Instant Love" and "Now & Then". "Sugar Me" and "Getting a Drag" are remixed as club versions and feature as the last two tracks on the album.

== Covers ==
The song "We Got Love", was previously recorded and released in 1984 by the British soul group the Real Thing. The recording also appeared on the 1985 compilation album, Black Magic, as well as on the group's own 2021 Anthology 1972-1997 CD collection. The Real Thing's version peaked at No. 118 on the UK chart and also made the UK Disco and Dance Chart at No. 50. A Spanish language version of "Words Don't Mean a Thing" was released by Spanish group Cadafal on their 1984 album En La Carretera. However, de Paul's versions of these two songs were released for the first time on this album, although she did perform the latter on a TV programme, Ladybirds, about her. "Words Don't Mean a Thing" was subsequently featured on the album Songs from the British Academy, Vol. 1 in 2008, showcasing some of the UK's leading artists including Peter Gabriel, Boy George and KT Tunstall.

The club mix of "Sugar Me" (track 12) was released as a white label 12-inch single and credited to DJ Baz & Lynsey de Paul in 1994. This version also appeared on the album Dance Megamixes as well as on Dance Sensation – The Ultimate Urban Dance Remix Collection in 2001. This track and also "Words Don't Mean a Thing" are among the most played tracks from de Paul on BBC radio in the UK.

Although it was not included on the original CD version of this album, another track recorded at the same sessions was "A Little TLC" and this is included as part of the album on de Paul's online music store. The song was recorded for the first time by de Paul on this album, although it had previously been recorded by Latin boy band Menudo on their album Sons of Rock, with Ricky Martin on lead vocals, as well as by Japanese soul singer Marlene, Chinese singer Sam Hui with Chinese lyrics as "Xin Si Si" and US/Israeli TV band, Kidd Video.

== Track listing ==
1. "Sugar Me" (Lynsey de Paul, Barry Blue)
2. "Getting a Drag" (Lynsey de Paul, David Jordan)
3. "Words Don't Mean a Thing" (Lynsey de Paul, Scott English)
4. "We Got Love" (Lynsey de Paul, Terry Britten)
5. "Storm in a Teacup" (Lynsey de Paul, Ron Roker)
6. "Dancing on a Saturday Night" (Lynsey de Paul, Barry Blue)
7. "Just a Little Time" (Lynsey de Paul, Gerard Kenny)
8. "Instant Love" (Lynsey de Paul, Ian Lynn)
9. "Now & Then" (Lynsey de Paul, Mike Moran)
10. "Won't Somebody Dance with Me" (Lynsey de Paul)
11. "Sugar Me" (Club Mix) (Lynsey de Paul, Barry Blue)
12. "Getting a Drag" (Club Mix) (Lynsey de Paul, David Jordan)
