= Rotherham (disambiguation) =

Rotherham is a town in South Yorkshire, England.

Rotherham or Rotheram may also refer to:

== Places ==
- Rotherham (UK Parliament constituency), the borough constituency covering the town
- Metropolitan Borough of Rotherham, including the town
- Rotherham, New Zealand, a village

== People ==
- Alan Rotherham (1862–1898), English rugby union footballer
- Arthur Rotherham (1869–1946), English rugby union footballer
- Edward Rotheram (1753–1830), Royal Navy captain
- Gerard Rotherham (1899–1985), English cricketer
- Hugh Rotherham (1861–1939), English cricketer
- Joseph Bryant Rotherham (1828–1910), British biblical scholar, minister of the Churches of Christ and prolific writer
- Roland Rotherham, British historian and lecturer
- Steve Rotheram (born 1961), Metro Mayor of the Liverpool City Region and former UK Member of Parliament
- Thomas Rotherham (1423–1500), English cleric and statesman, Archbishop of York and twice Lord Chancellor of England

== Other uses ==
- HMS Rotherham (H09), a Second World War Royal Navy destroyer
- Baron Rotherham, an extinct title in the Peerage of the United Kingdom
- Rotherham United F.C., a football club based in the English town
- Rotherham Titans, a rugby union club based in the town

== See also ==
- Rotherham Town F.C. (disambiguation)
