= Into My Music =

Compilation album by Lynsey de Paul
- Released: 18 March 2013
- Recorded: 1975–79
- Label: RPM
- Producer: Lynsey de Paul, Rupert Holmes

Lynsey de Paul chronology
Sugar and Beyond (2013)	Into My Music (2013)	Ten Best (2015)

Into My Music - Anthology 1975-1979 is a digitally remastered double album, featuring songs written and performed by Lynsey de Paul, that was released on 18 March 2013 on Cherry Red's RPM Retrodisc label. All recordings have been remastered by de Paul and Simon Murphy from original tape sources and co-produced by de Paul and Mark Stratford. The album is packaged with photographs and memorabilia from de Paul's personal archive and text by Michael Robson.

== History ==
Disc one featured tracks from de Paul's 1975 Jet Records album, Love Bomb including the title song (which was released together with "Sugar Shuffle" in the US, and was covered by the US soul singer Cheryl Lynn on her album In Love), plus two non-album singles ("Rhythm and Blue Jean Baby" backed with "Into My Music" and "If I Don't Get You The Next One Will") plus "You Made Me Write This Song", which was the B-side to the single (and the Love Bomb album track) and has never been released before on CD. Other notable tracks include the single "Hug and Squeeze Me" and the quirky but philosophical song "Season To Season", that de Paul often played on TV shows in the mid 1970s.

The second disc contains tracks from the previously unreleased third LP for Jet Records recorded in 1976 - outside of Japan, this was the first time that these songs had officially been released. Also on the second CD is "Rock Bottom", de Paul's international Eurovision hit written and performed with Mike Moran, as well as the B-side duet, "You Shouldn't Say That". The follow-up 1977 non-album single, "You Give Me Those Feelings", is also included are some but not all of the songs from the Rupert Holmes produced Tigers and Fireflies album, including "Losin' the Blues For You" and "Melancholy Melon", two songs that were co-written with the US actor James Coburn and the jaunty "Without You", co-written with Mike Moran. Despite releases on vinyl, this was the first time that these songs had been released on CD.

As was the case for the previous anthology double album, Sugar and Beyond, the CD comes with a booklet containing stories about the songs and de Paul's career, as well as photos and items that de Paul personally chose from her own archive. Journalist Stephen Unwin reviewed the album and gave it 4/5, writing "...on the barometer between Deborah Harry and Farrah Fawcett was Lynsey de Paul, a pop star who did sexy without going above the knee. She was also a formidable songwriter, a talent sometimes forgotten". Ian Sime writing in "The Press" gave the album a rating of 4 out of 4 stars in a review that also encompassed the Lily Allen album "Sheezus" and he stated "Vocally and arrangements wise, there are very close similarities to the works of Allen and De Paul. Those ethereal overdubbed harmonies are very distinctive, and copied by very few others". The online music magazine "Popshifter" also gave the album a positive review, along with its companion release Sugar and Beyond and mentioned de Paul as the trailblazer for Kate Bush, but also as a pioneer in her own right, since she had critical success and being a woman performing her own songs in an era when this was not common. They state that "the tone of de Paul's music is unique and provides a feminine tone of detachment, sexual agency, wit, and sharp observation, which are things not often seen in mainstream modern cultural ideas of femininity" and concluded "While obviously recognized at the time both by fellow musicians and critics, history is never kind to female artists in male-dominated fields. She is one of the best musicians of her genre and of mainstream British music in general".

== Track listing ==
CD Disc 1

1. "Sugar Shuffle" (de Paul, Barry Blue)
2. "Shoobeedoo Wey Doobee How" (de Paul, Blue)
3. "Love Bomb" (de Paul, Blue)
4. "Dreams" (de Paul)
5. "Crystal Ball" (de Paul, Blue)
6. "Hug and Squeeze Me" (de Paul, Blue)
7. "Hungry for Love" (de Paul, Blue)
8. "You Are The Happiest Day of My Life" (de Paul, Blue)
9. "Season to Season" (de Paul)
10. "Rhythm and Blue Jean Baby" (de Paul)
11. "Into My Music" (de Paul)
12. "You Made Me Write This Song" (de Paul)
13. "If I Don't Get You The Next One Will" (de Paul)

CD Disc 2

1. "Call Me" (de Paul)
2. "They'd Rather Be Making Money" (de Paul)
3. "Before You Go Tonight" (de Paul)
4. "Take Your Time" (de Paul)
5. "You Either Got It Or You Ain't" (de Paul, David Jordan)
6. "Martian Man" (de Paul)
7. "Do Unto Others" (de Paul)
8. "Rock Bottom" (de Paul, Mike Moran)
9. "You Shouldn't Say That" (de Paul, Moran)
10. "You Give Me Those Feelings" (de Paul)
11. "Beautiful" (de Paul)
12. "Tigers and Fireflies" (de Paul)
13. "Losin' The Blues for You" (de Paul, James Coburn)
14. "Without You" (de Paul, Moran)
15. "Forever and a Day" (de Paul)
16. "Melancholy Melon" (de Paul, Coburn)
