= Love Bomb =

Love Bomb may refer to:

== Music ==
=== Albums ===
- Love Bomb (Lynsey de Paul album) or the title song (see below), 1975
- Love Bomb (The Tubes album), 1985
- Love Bomb, by Bobby Braddock, 1980
- Love Bomb - Live 1967-69, or the 1969 title song (see below), by Blossom Toes, 2009

=== Songs ===
- "Love Bomb" (B'z song), English-language version of "Ai no Bakudan", 2012
- "Love Bomb" (Lynsey de Paul song), 1975
- "Love Bomb", by AC/DC from Ballbreaker, 1995
- "Love Bomb", by Blossom Toes from If Only for a Moment, 1969
- "Love Bomb", by Clare Grogan, 1987
- "Love Bomb", by Fromis 9 from From.9, 2018
- "Love Bomb", by Girls Aloud from Sound of the Underground, 2003
- "Love Bomb", by Grinderman from Grinderman, 2007
- "Love Bomb", by N.E.R.D. from Seeing Sounds, 2008
- "Love Bomb", by Simon F of Intaferon
- "Love Bomb", by Tinsley Ellis from The Hard Way, 2004
- "Love Bomb", by d3r, 2024

== Other uses ==
- Love Bomb, a fashion line by Lover
- The Love Bomb, a podcast by Nico Tortorella

== See also ==
- Love bombing, an attempt to influence a person by demonstrations of affection
