= The Dolmen =

English folk rock band

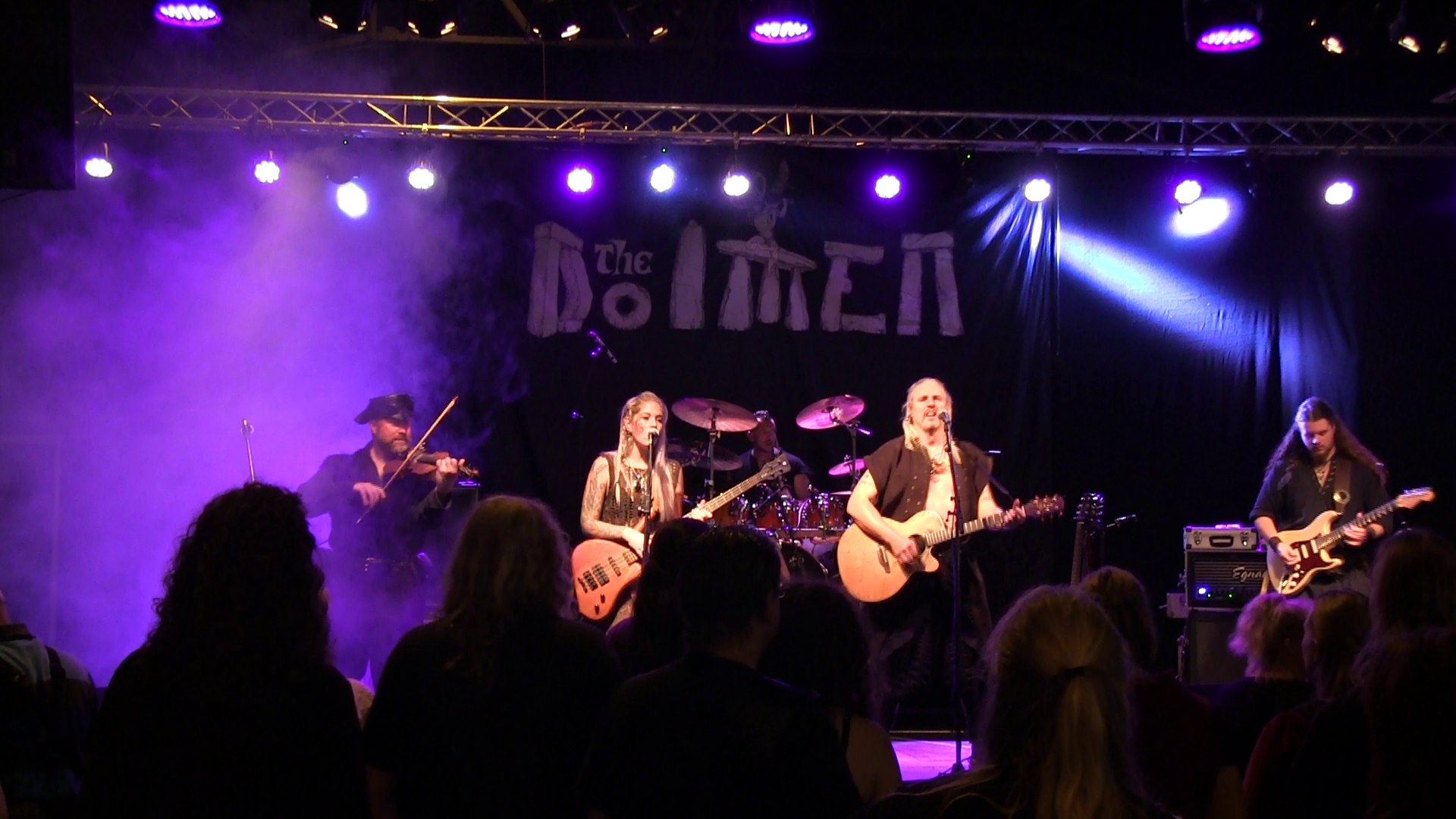
- The Dolmen at the Gothic & Fantasy Fair at De Broodfabriek in Rijswijk, Netherlands (2014)

Background information
- Origin: United Kingdom
- Genres: Celtic rock, pagan rock, gothic rock, alternative rock
- Years active: 1990–present
- Members: Taloch Jameson; Josh Elliott; Connach Jameson; Lena M. Paak; Rob Van Barschot
- Past members: Kayleigh Marchant; Chris Jones; Anja Novotny

The Dolmen are an English, Weymouth, Dorset-based, Celtic rock/folk rock band that incorporate elements of Celtic, folk, pagan-themed, and historically based musical works into their largely original repertoire. Founded by singer and songwriter Taloch Jameson, the band has had various lineups over the four decades of its existence. Current band members are:

- Taloch Jameson (lead vocalist, guitar)
- Josh Elliot (electric guitar, vocals, whistle)
- Connach Jameson (electric guitar, bass guitar, vocals, drums)
- Lena M. Paak (keyboard, bass guitar, vocals)
- Rob Van Barschot (drums)

Essential non-musician members of the band are lyric contributor and collaborator, Mark Vine and sound engineer Kirsty Kelly.

The majority of the band's songs and music are composed and produced by multi-instrumentalist Jameson. On more recent albums the other band members have contributed lyrics, musical compositions and production assistance.

== History ==
The Dolmen was founded by Taloch Jameson and began rather informally in or about 1990, with their first public appearance at The Duke of Albany pub in Weymouth, Dorset, where they debuted as a mainly folk music oriented group. Since that time, they have become well known on the local and surrounding areas music scene, appearing over the years for repeat performances at many major UK music venues and festivals; among them the Glastonbury Festival in 1995 and 1997, the Farnham Jazz and Guilford Festivals, The Children of Artemis Witchfest, and The Pagan Federation festivals. They have also appeared frequently at Stonehenge in support of The Dolmen Grove, a United Paths Pagan organization based in the South of England.

In 2007, members of The Dolmen were invited special guests at the first New Seven Wonders of the World ceremonies in Lisbon, Portugal, Jameson's original composition having been chosen as the official anthem of that year's "Wonders" contest.

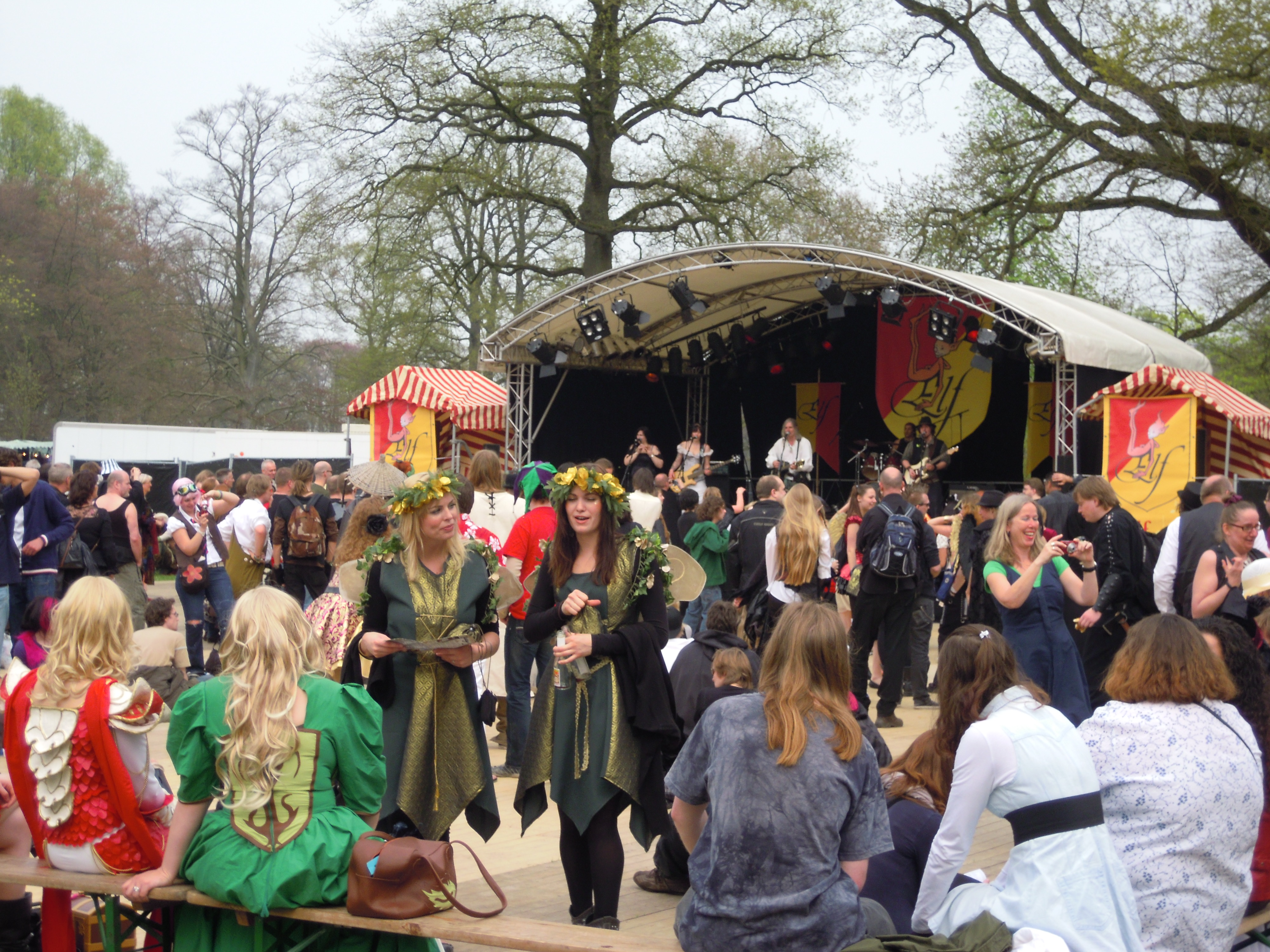
The Dolmen at the Elf Fantasy Fair in Haarzuilens, Netherlands (2011)

In 2011, the band debuted the continental European leg of their "Storm Tour" with performances at the Elf Fantasy Fair in Haarzuilens, Netherlands.

The Dolmen also appeared over the summer of 2011 at the Keltisch Midzomer Festival, Fantastyval Wouwse Plantage, the Sneek Festival; and in September 2011, at the finale of the Highland Games, in Hank, Netherlands.

Summer 2012 tours for the band included several festival appearances from June through September at the "Mittelalterlich Phantasie Spectaculum" in Germany and also in the Netherlands. 2013 saw the inauguration of the band's "Nuada God of the Sun" tour.

In August 2014, and many years onward, the band performed at Castlefest in Lisse, Netherlands, one of their live albums was recorded at the Castlefest show in 2016. In October 2014 they performed at the Gothic & Fantasy Fair in Rijswijk, Netherlands and in December 2014 they performed at the Midwinter Fair in the Archeon in Alphen aan den Rijn, Netherlands.

The Dolmen played at the very first Fantast Forest festival in the UK in July 2019, and have played at the festival every year since then (up to 2025 at the time of writing) except for 2020 when the festival was cancelled because of Covid restrictions.

In 2019, The Dolmen were named "Best International Live Band", at the Bastaard Fantasy Awards, where they also won "Best Album Of The Year" for their 2018 album, "Wytches and Cunningfolk". In addition, The Dolmen were named "Best Pagan Band UK" in the 2018 "Pagan Events UK" competition.

The band has since undergone several changes in the line-up. In 2024, Kayleigh Marchant, bass player and lead vocalist of several songs, decided to leave the band. Their album The Horned Man, released in 2025, was the first one with Lena M. Paak as bass player.

== Music ==
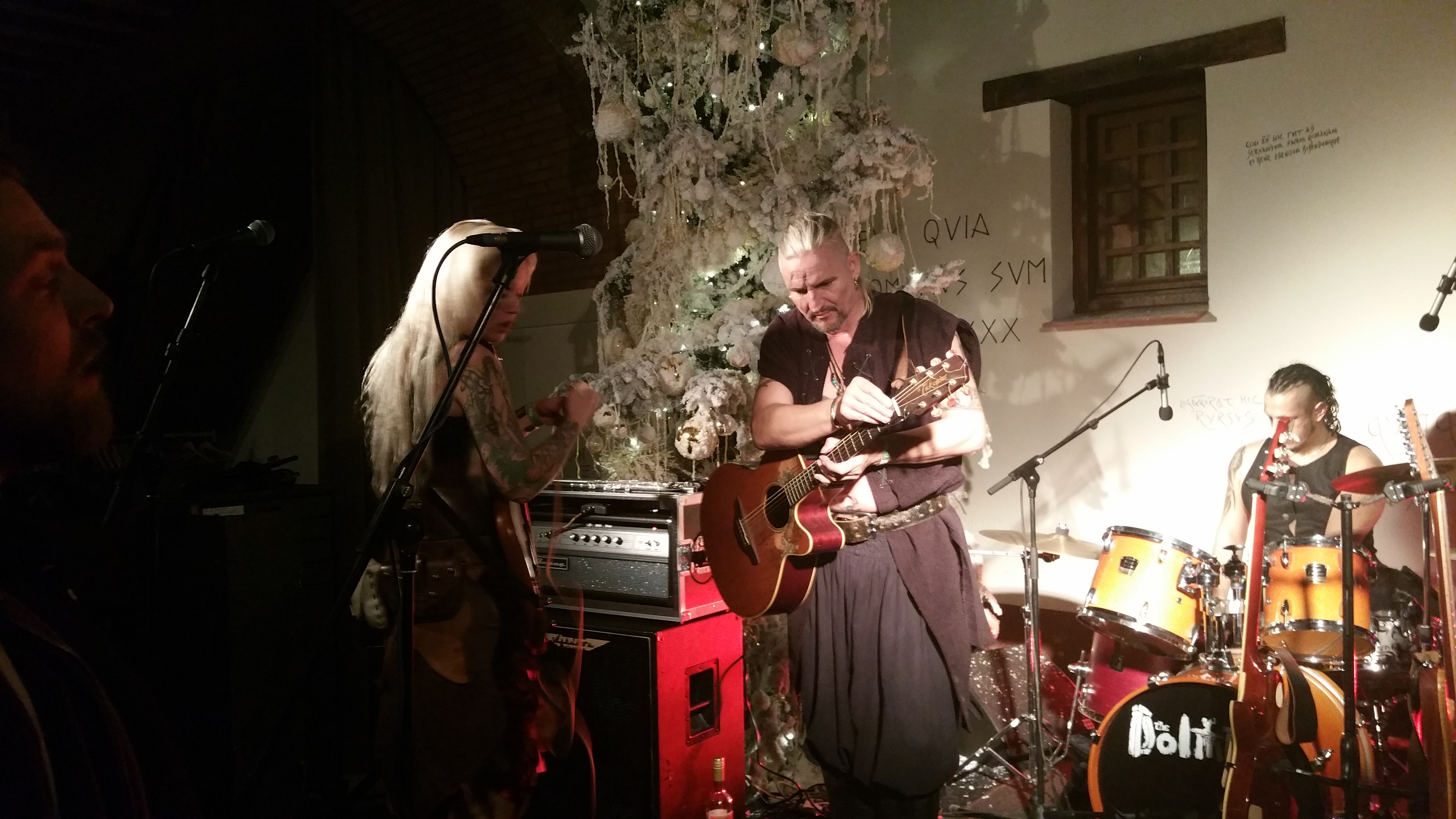
The Dolmen at the Midwinter Fair in Archeon, Alphen aan den Rijn (2015)

The Dolmen are an independent, self-published group. Their musical style covers a wide range from traditional Celtic folk music to electric rock, including modern interpretations of historical material and events.

In 2008, the band released "Winter Solstice", a collection of original carols and songs inspired by the ancient pre-Christian themes of the season, drawing heavily upon the pagan traditions and mythology of the British Isles associated with the celebration of Yule.

The Dolmen's early 2010 album, The Crabchurch Conspiracy is a departure in many ways from their general offerings in that it is a musical re-telling of the events of a little-known but decisive battle of the English Civil War taking place in February 1645 at the strategic Dorset seaport of Weymouth. Based on the book of the same name by author/historian and Dolmen collaborator Mark Vine, the album utilizes both song and spoken word to recount the daring exploits of the Sydenham brothers, William and Francis, who thwarted the Royalist conspirators in their bid to seize the town, culminating in The Battle of Weymouth. Professor Ronald Hutton of the University of Bristol, a leading expert on 17th century Britain, speaks a stirring introduction to the album.

In August 2010, the band released their first double album, "Spirits of the Sea", a collection of original songs, sea chanteys, and atmospheric musical arrangements interspersed with tales and narrations of the historical exploits of several well-known pirates, buccaneers and 'gentlemen of the marque'. Among the album's Poole, Devon, Dorset and Bristol UK privateers are Blackbeard, John Rackham, William Lewis, Edward Low, Henry Strangways, and the sinister husband-and-wife team of Eric Cobham and Maria Lindsey. The album also celebrates in song and story the infamous Harry Paye of Poole, whose life and adventures are spoken of on the album by a linear descendant, Mr. Bob Paye. Mr. Paye, a retired educator, lives still within the area from which his famous ancestor sailed forth. "Paye Day", now a charitable event, is celebrated each Summer in Poole in honor of their famous pirate son.

The Dolmen created "The Pirates Keep", a musically oriented gathering that, with the support of several historically influenced re-enactment groups, meets at various venues within the UK to re-create pirate gatherings.

Aside from the band's collective efforts, Taloch has released several solo albums over the years. Among the most notable is Crow Dance, a largely shamanistic themed journey that explores his ancestral Native American heritage, incorporating also ancient spiritual elements of his Welsh roots.

== Album art ==
Since the release of Taloch Jameson's solo album, Crow Dance, all subsequent album art and overall CD design have been created by Weymouth, Dorset artist and illustrator, Semirani Wolf Vine. Notable for her fluid imagery and utilization of vivid, primary colours, she also collaborates with the band in the production of concert posters and a variety of material for media release.

== Discography ==
- 1994: Dolmenation
- 1995: Spirits of the Land
- 1998: Above & Below
- 2000: Undefeated
- 2005: Dolmen Folk
- 2007: Songs From the Cauldron
- 2008: Ah Ry Ah
- 2008: Winter Solstice
- 2010: Crabchurch Conspiracy, based on a historical work by Mark Vine
- 2010: Spirits of The Sea
- 2011: Whispering Winds
- 2012: Storm
- 2012: Wytchlord
- 2013: Crann Tara (Collaboration with the band Soar Patrol)
- 2014: The Banquet
- 2014: The Ballad of Cape Clear
- 2015: Kayleigh
- 2016: Live at Castlefest
- 2016: NUADA
- 2018: Wytches & Cunningfolk
- 2019: Victor Vassago's Infernal Theatre
- 2022: Celtic Giants (Collaboration with the band Connach)
- 2023: Devil's Crest
- 2024: The Horned Man
- 2025: The Dolmen, Best of 2007-2023
- 2025: Pirate Soul
