= Elfia (festival) =

Costume and Fantasy festival

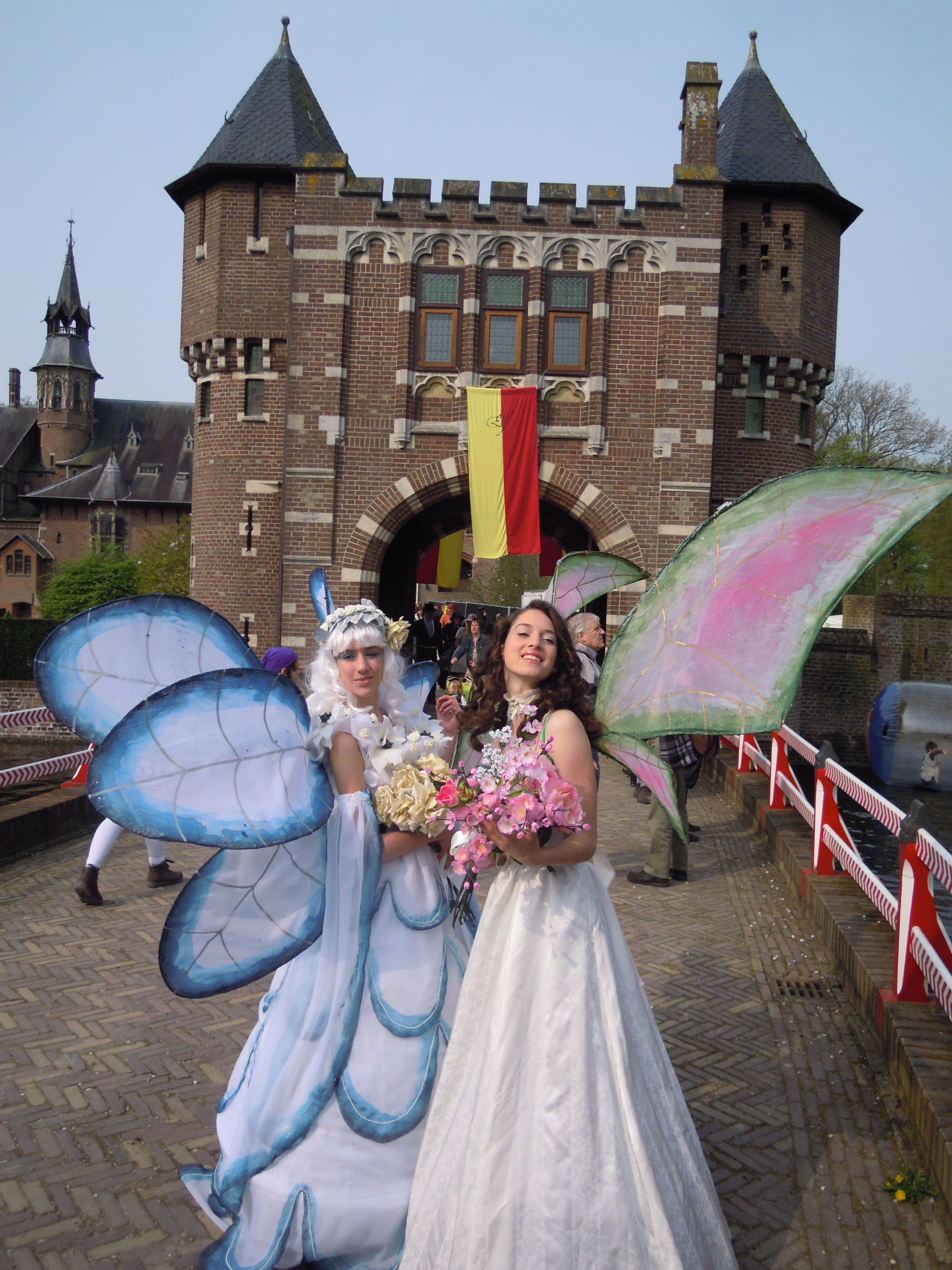
Cosplayers at the fair in 2011

Elfia, formerly known as the Elf Fantasy Fair, is a fantasy-themed cosplay festival held twice a year in the Netherlands. Besides fantasy, Elfia hosts themes from science fiction, LARP, gothic, manga, cosplay and historical reenactment genres.

It was organized in 2001 in the historical theme park Archeon. From 2009 Elfia (also known as the Kingdom of Elfia) appears twice a year, in April at Castle de Haar, Haarzuilens, and in September at Castle Arcen, Arcen. The Haarzuilens event is the largest fantasy and costume event in Europe, and attracts some 27,000 visitors every year. Elfia was created by Stefan Struik, but is now managed by his sister Helena Struik, with the support of a group of small companies.

The fair characterizes itself as a kingdom with a real flag, a border with fantasy customs officers, and royal elections. There are ambassadors appointed in seven different countries.

Previous guests of honour included Terry Pratchett, Robert Jordan, Tarja Turunen, Stanislav Ianevski, Brian Froud, Brian Muir and Christopher Paolini. The German band Faun often headlined the event, and the English lecturer Roland Rotherham regularly gives lectures in the castle's chapel.

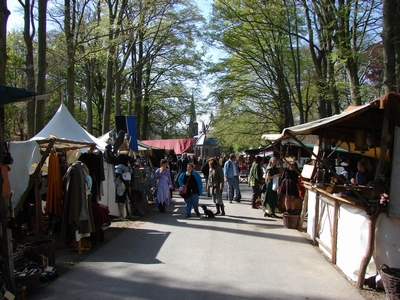
The fair in 2007

== Other events ==
Since the Elf Fantasy Fair proved to be a success, there have been other fantasy related events held in The Netherlands, such as the Gothic & Fantasy Beurs at De Broodfabriek in Rijswijk (Gothic & Fantasy Exhibition, since 2003, now Fantasy Fest), the Midwinter Fair at the Archeon, Alphen aan den Rijn (since 2003), Castlefest at the Keukenhof, Lisse (since 2005), the Gothic & Fantasy Fair in Arnhem (between 2007 and 2009), Keltfest near Dordrecht (since 2008, now near Amsterdam), the MysticFair in Rotterdam (in 2008 and 2009), Nox Obscura (in 2008), Phantasium in Eindhoven (between 2009 and 2013), Fantastic Amsterdam in Amsterdam (in 2009 and 2010) Fantastyval (between 2009 and 2014). and the Midzomer Fair (Midsummer Fair, between 2010 and 2012).

== See also ==
- Renaissance fair
- Tewkesbury Medieval Festival
