= RTFC =

RTFC may refer to one of the following British association football clubs:

- Radstock Town F.C.
- Raunds Town F.C.
- Reading Town F.C.
- Rhayader Town F.C.
- Rhuddlan Town F.C.
- Ringwood Town F.C.
- Rochdale Town F.C.
- Romsey Town F.C.
- Ross Town F.C.
- Rotherham Town F.C. (disambiguation)
- Rothwell Town F.C.
- Royston Town F.C.
- Rugby Town F.C.
- Ruthin Town F.C.
