= Tigers and Fireflies =

Studio album by Lynsey de Paul
- Released: April 1979
- Studios: Long View Farm Studios, North Brookfield, Massachusetts, U.S.
- Genre: Pop
- Label: Polydor
- Producer: Rupert Holmes

Lynsey de Paul chronology
Getting a Drag (1976)	Tigers and Fireflies (1979)	Profile (1981)

Tigers and Fireflies (sometimes referred to as Tigers & Fireflies) is an album recorded in 1978 and released by Lynsey de Paul in April 1979 on the Polydor record label in the UK, Europe, Japan, Hong Kong, Singapore, Malaysia and South America. It was launched at a special event at the Mayfair Club in London, with de Paul looking similar to the 1940s film star Veronica Lake with Busby Berkeley film clips. The album was recorded at Long View Farm Studios with additional recording at Mediasound Studios, New York and produced by Rupert Holmes. In his 1986 biography, Justin de Villeneuve, de Paul's manager at the time wrote "I gave Rupert Holmes a call in New York. He agreed to see me if I flew to America. Polydor, with the prospect of the involvement with Holmes, agreed to up the budget". The collaboration between de Paul and Holmes on Tigers and Fireflies was mentioned on the Ray Shasho Show, when Shasho interviewed Holmes on his BBS radio show on 7 August 2018. The story behind the recording of the album was also discussed in the book Dervish Dust: The Life and Words of James Coburn. Speaking to Music Week about the album, Jim Cook said "Throw away all of your preconceived ideas about Lynsey de Paul" and the Scottish press reported "Nifty production by Rupert Holmes has the petit blonde back on form. Not a weak song on the album".

== Tracks ==
The first album track is the lead single "Hollywood Romance" (co-written by de Paul and David Jordan) which was released ahead of the album in October 1978 and was well received. It was BBC Radio 1 DJ Dave Lee Travis's record of the week during his time as "the Hairy Cornflake" and became a radio airplay hit. It was also released on the BBC Latin America label (together with "Don't Take Love for Granted" by Lulu and "Got to Get You into My Life" by Earth, Wind and Fire), and it is still played on BBC radio.

The follow-up single "Tigers and Fireflies" was released on 26 January 1979 just prior to the album itself. Some years later, de Paul revealed that the song 'Tigers and Fireflies' was about two of her former managers Gordon Mills and Don Arden and is about being cheated and lied to with dazzling promises. De Paul had already performed a precursor version of the song with the more telling title "False Friends and Fireflies" and slightly different lyrics on the Des O'Connor Tonight show in October 1977, shown on primetime BBC. Both versions of the song are listed in the ASCAP ACE song database. "Tigers and Fireflies" was playlisted by national BBC Radio 2 as well as many BBC local radio stations but it received little if any play on the UK commercial radio stations.

Other tracks include "Losin' the Blues for You" (which was the B-side to the single version of "Hollywood Romance") and "Melancholy Melon", both co-written by de Paul and her boyfriend at the time, the actor James Coburn, Coburn was present when the album was being recorded, having flown from South America where he was filming Firepower with Sophia Loren. "'Twas" is a piano bar song with a blues tinged feel and is the only song that was co-written with the album's producer, Rupert Holmes. "Before You Go Tonight" was an affectionate song for former partner Ringo Starr, who was leaving for the US while de Paul remained in the UK. De Paul teamed up with former Eurovision Song Contest writing and singing partner Mike Moran to write the jaunty "Without You". The album also featured a striking, updated, re-recording of her earlier hit single "My Man and Me" that has a more bluesy feeling than the original ballad. The final track, "Beautiful", is a song in its own right but ends by reprising snatches of each of the album's songs woven into the fade out.

As noted elsewhere, de Paul's vocals had never sounded stronger, in a style somewhere between Crystal Gayle and Maria Muldaur, in spite of her apparently suffering from a bout of hay fever at the time. The album was well received and garnered positive reviews in the music press, with Smash Hits nominating "Hollywood Romance" and "Losin' the Blues for You" as the album's best tracks.

Six of the original album tracks, including the title track, "Melancholy Melon" and "Without You", were finally released for the first time on CD on de Pauls' anthology CD Into My Music in March 2013 and the original striking album sleeve was used for a limited issue release on Think! Records label in Japan. Surprisingly, "Hollywood Romance" was not included on Into My Music - since de Paul herself oversaw the selection - and it has yet to be released on CD, although it is available as a mp3 download. It still is played on International radio stations, most recently on the David Sheppard show as is "Tigers and Fireflies".

De Paul played the song "Forever and a Day" on her piano while being interviewed as part of her taking part in the Celebrity Special of Come Dine With Me first shown on primetime TV in 2008.

== Musicians and other credits ==
A number of well respected and accomplished U.S. musicians were recruited to play on the album, including Tom Malone who played all of the brass, reeds and flutes on the album and Joel Diamond played acoustic piano. Long term Holmes collaborators Dean Bailin and John Caruso played various guitars and electric bass guitar, respectively. Gary Burke played drums and percussion, Bob Christianson played synthesizers as well as clavinet and singing backing vocals, and former Mick Ronson collaborator Dede Washburn provided percussion and backing vocals. Holmes also played clarinet and electric piano. Jesse Henderson and Michael Barbiero were the engineers and Henderson mixed the album. The striking photography for the front cover (de Paul hiding around a corner from a man with a torch) and back cover (de Paul marching away, hair fluttering behind her) sleeve was by John Shaw, with art direction and design by Jo Mirowski.

== Cover versions ==
Songs on the album that have been covered by other artists include "My Man and Me", recorded by Carl Wayne (as "My Girl and Me"), as well as the Swedish artist Agneta Munther, and by the Japanese musician Hummingbird. A jazzy/blues version of "Hollywood Romance" was given Japanese lyrics and recorded as "Romance" on the 2013 album Froggie by Japanese singer-songwriter Yoshiko Goshima (aka 五島 良子). Chinese singer 濃情 covered the song as Track A4 on her 1981 album 林嘉寶 with lyrics by Caron (卡龍) under the title "濃情" ("Passionate"). Lena Zavaroni also covered "Hollywood Romance" as a song and dance routine with the "Ace Eight dancers". It was the fifth number from the second episode of her first BBC prime time TV series, Lena Zavaroni and Music. Jake H. Concepcion, a saxophonist of Philippine descent but active in Japan, recorded his version of "Without You" on his 1983 album, J.

== Track listing ==
A-side

1. "Hollywood Romance" (Lynsey de Paul, David Jordan)
2. "My Man and Me" (Lynsey de Paul)
3. "Without You" (Lynsey de Paul, Mike Moran)
4. "Forever and a Day" (Lynsey de Paul)
5. "Tigers and Fireflies" (Lynsey de Paul)

B-side

1. "Melancholy Melon" (Lynsey de Paul, James Coburn)
2. "Losin' the Blues for You" (Lynsey de Paul, James Coburn)
3. "Before You Go Tonight" (Lynsey de Paul)
4. "'Twas" (Lynsey de Paul, Rupert Holmes)
5. "Beautiful" (Lynsey de Paul)
