= Love Bomb (Lynsey de Paul song) =

1975 song performed by Lynsey de Paul

"Love Bomb" is a song and title track from the album Love Bomb by Lynsey de Paul, written by de Paul and Barry Blue. It is listed in the Catalog of Copyright Entries held by the Library of Congress 1976. The song's lyrics express "a call for love and peace".

As a single, it was released on the Mercury Records label in the United States and by Jet Records in the UK. In some European countries, it was released by Polydor Records. The recording also featured on the French dance compilation album, Special-Discotheque Club Privé – N°3, released on the Polydor label. De Paul's single version most recently appeared as a track on her double CD anthology, Into My Music. The Record Mirror & Disc gave the single a positive review, stating "a thumping chorus and explosion... scarcely what you would expect from Lynsey". It was also praised with one British newspaper writing "By the blonde bomb, Lynsey's syrupy, breathy, voice should take her to the top of the charts with this bouncy number".

The song has been covered by U.S. soul singer Cheryl Lynn, English Celtic rock band The Dolmen, and German band The Cherry Chords. On 28 May 2020, Dornbirn 78 released a CD single with four versions of the song. This release received favourable reviews. The Dornbirn 78 versions were championed by "Special Requests", a promoter of cutting-edge electronic music.

The song is still played on radio, for example on "The Evan "Funk" Davies Show" (WFMU) and "radio x - Frankfurter Stadtradio".
