= Love Bomb (Lynsey de Paul album) =

Studio album by Lynsey de Paul
- Released: 1975
- Studios: Marquee Studios, London
- Label: Jet
- Producer: Lynsey de Paul

Lynsey de Paul chronology
The World of Lynsey de Paul (1974)	Love Bomb (1975)	No, Honestly (1975)

Love Bomb is the fourth album released in 1975 by the British singer-songwriter Lynsey de Paul, and her second album released on Jet Records in the UK and Polydor in Germany, Australia and Japan. In the US and Canada, it was released in January 1976 on Mercury Records. The album was recorded at the Marquee Studios, London, England, produced by de Paul and arranged by Tony Hymas, with Terry Cox playing drums, John Dean percussion, Chris Rea guitar and Frank McDonald bass. The striking sleeve cover photo of de Paul in U.S. military style clothing was taken by Brian Aris.

== Live performances ==
De Paul performed live versions of some of the album's songs as a special weekly guest on Cooper, the Tommy Cooper series produced by Thames Television, that was broadcast on ITV in late 1975. Songs performed from the album included "No, Honestly", "Hungry for Love" and "Shoobeedoo Wey Doobee How", with each song introduced by a witty exchange between de Paul and DJ David Hamilton. The shows were released on DVD by Network Distributing in 2008.

== Singles ==
As well as containing the hit single, "No, Honestly" (which was also the theme for the TV comedy series of the same name), the album included the soul/disco infused UK single "Love Bomb" (at 4:54 minutes too long for radio play) and the ballad "Hug and Squeeze Me" (sometimes referred to as "Hug and Squeeze" on later compilation albums), which was also released as a single in November 1975 (backed by the non-album song "You Made Me Write This Song"). The song highlights of the album according to AllMusic are "Dreams" and "No, Honestly".

"Sugar Shuffle" was released as a single in the US and Japan, with the UK single A-side "Love Bomb" being relegated to the B-side. "Sugar Shuffle" received positive reviews in the US in industry trade magazines such as Record World, with Cashbox writing "Lynsey is a very hot writer in Great Britain at this point in time, and so she's earned a shot at the United States "Sugar Shuffle" is well worth that shot. Cool little teasing vocal gets straight to the point, "Get some honey/forget the money/do the sugar shuffle." The lady works with words very well and has a memorable voice". Although it was not released as a single in the UK, "Sugar Shuffle" was popular on a number of mainstream UK radio stations, including BBC Radio 1. In 2020, it was included on the album Bob Stanley Presents 76 in the Shade with reviewer Martin Ruddock singling it out as "The poolside cool of Lynsey De Paul’s sedate Sugar Shuffle".

== Other recordings ==
The song "Love Bomb" was covered in 1979 by the American singer Cheryl Lynn as a track on her U.S. charting album In Love, which was produced by De Paul's writing partner, Barry Blue and has been remixed by Glenn Rivera. According to the magazine Sepia, "Love Bomb" was one of three outstanding tracks on Lynn's In Love album and Record World also mentions it in their review of the album. It was also covered by the UK Celtic/folk-rock band, The Dolmen. In 2020, three mixes of "Love Bomb" were released by Dornbirn 78 on Codek Records with vocals by the Lithuanian artist Adelina Sasnauskaitė, produced by Sasa Crnobrnja & Bryan Mette. "Sugar Shuffle" was updated and covered by Japanese artist Asami Kobayashi on her 1984 album, Cryptography which reached number 4 on the Japanese album charts. The song "No, Honestly" was covered by Brazilian singer, Jeannie and also by the Danish singer Vivian (a.k.a. Vivian Johansen).

The track "Love Bomb" appeared on a French discotheque compilations album in 1975. More recently, a remix of de Paul's version of "Love Bomb" is featured in the TOWN II // TELEGRAPH footage for the Peter Hutton film, Three Landscapes, which was released in 2013. The German group "Lovebomb" is named after the title song, as is the U.S. band formed by Robert Holmes.

The song "Shoobeedoo Wey Doobee How" was featured as a track on the 1992 compilation album "'Tis Blue Drops; A Sense of Suburbia Sweet". In March 2019, as part of International Women's Day, Jann Arden chose "You Are The Happiest Day of My Life" from Love Bomb as one of the songs that means most to her. The track "Crystal Ball" was sampled and used as the basis for the song "Takista" by Finnish artist "Huge L" on his 2011 album "Yo Yo!" In 2020, de Paul's version of "Sugar Shuffle" was released as a track on the compilation vinyl album 76 In The Shade, presented by Bob Stanley, which peaked at number 23 on the Dutch albums chart and number 78 on the UK Official Compilations chart.

== Reception ==
The album has been critically acclaimed including by de Paul's peers, such as musician, journalist, author Bob Stanley and was a notable album. The album was featured as one of Billboard 's recommended LPs on 27 December 1975 issue of Billboard magazine, and also received a positive reviews on 27 December 1975 issue of Cashbox, with the reviewer writing "The ingrained sultreyness of Lynsey de Paul's voice is the major focal point on "Love Bomb " The textured soulfulness of her pop oriented vocals makes the most of ballad and lightly up-tempo numbers. An effective adjunct to the singing is some carefully orchestrated instrumentals that seem to change moods in tandem with the singing registers. Good AM possibilities with equally strong chances at middle of the road and disco oriented stations. Top cuts include "You Are the Happiest Day of My Life," "Sugar Shuffle", "Hug and Squeeze Me" and “Season to Season" as well as High Fidelity and Stereo Review. UK weekly music paper Record Mirror stated "In a field of music where mediocrity is rife, Lynsey shows in no uncertain terms how things should be done properly". Canadian music magazine RPM stated "The beautiful and talented Britisher produced the LP and penned very cut".

The album is held by the US Library of Congress Washington, D.C., 20540 United States. It is also rated as one of the top albums released in 1975 by online site "Best ever albums", as well as one of the top 1000 albums released in the 1970s, a listing that also includes de Paul's previous albums Taste Me... Don't Waste Me and debut album Surprise. The album is also mentioned in the book How to Open & Operate a Financially Successful Independent Record Label as being popular as well as in the book The Mercury Labels: The 1969-1991 Era and Classical Recordings.

== Track listing ==
A side

1. "Sugar Shuffle" (Lynsey de Paul, Barry Blue)
2. "Shoobeedoo Wey Doobee How" (de Paul, Blue)
3. "Love Bomb" (de Paul, Blue)
4. "Dreams" (de Paul)
5. "Crystal Ball" (de Paul)

B side

1. "Hug and Squeeze Me" (de Paul)
2. "Hungry for Love" (de Paul, Blue)
3. "You Are the Happiest Day of My Life" (de Paul, Blue)
4. "No, Honestly" (de Paul)
5. "Season to Season" (de Paul)

== Re-issues ==
The "Love Bomb" album was re-issued on CD in Japan in 1990 on the Century label, but on this version the track "Crystal Ball" was replaced by "Rhythm and Blue Jean Baby" (originally a single only release). It was released again in 1999 in Japan on the Vivid label with "Crystal Ball" re-instated but also with "Nothing Really Lasts Forever" (the B-side to de Paul's 1974 hit single "Ooh I Do" and also composed by her) included. In 2010, the album was released on CD in the USA on the Renaissance label and included (in addition to the original tracks) "Sugar Me", "Getting a Drag", "Won't Somebody Dance with Me", "If I Don't Get You the Next One Will" and the Eurovision Song Contest 1977 entry "Rock Bottom", as bonus tracks, all of which were UK hit singles for de Paul. The CD album reached number 57 on the Brazilian iTunes chart in August 2018.
