= Roland Rotherham =

British writer and scholar

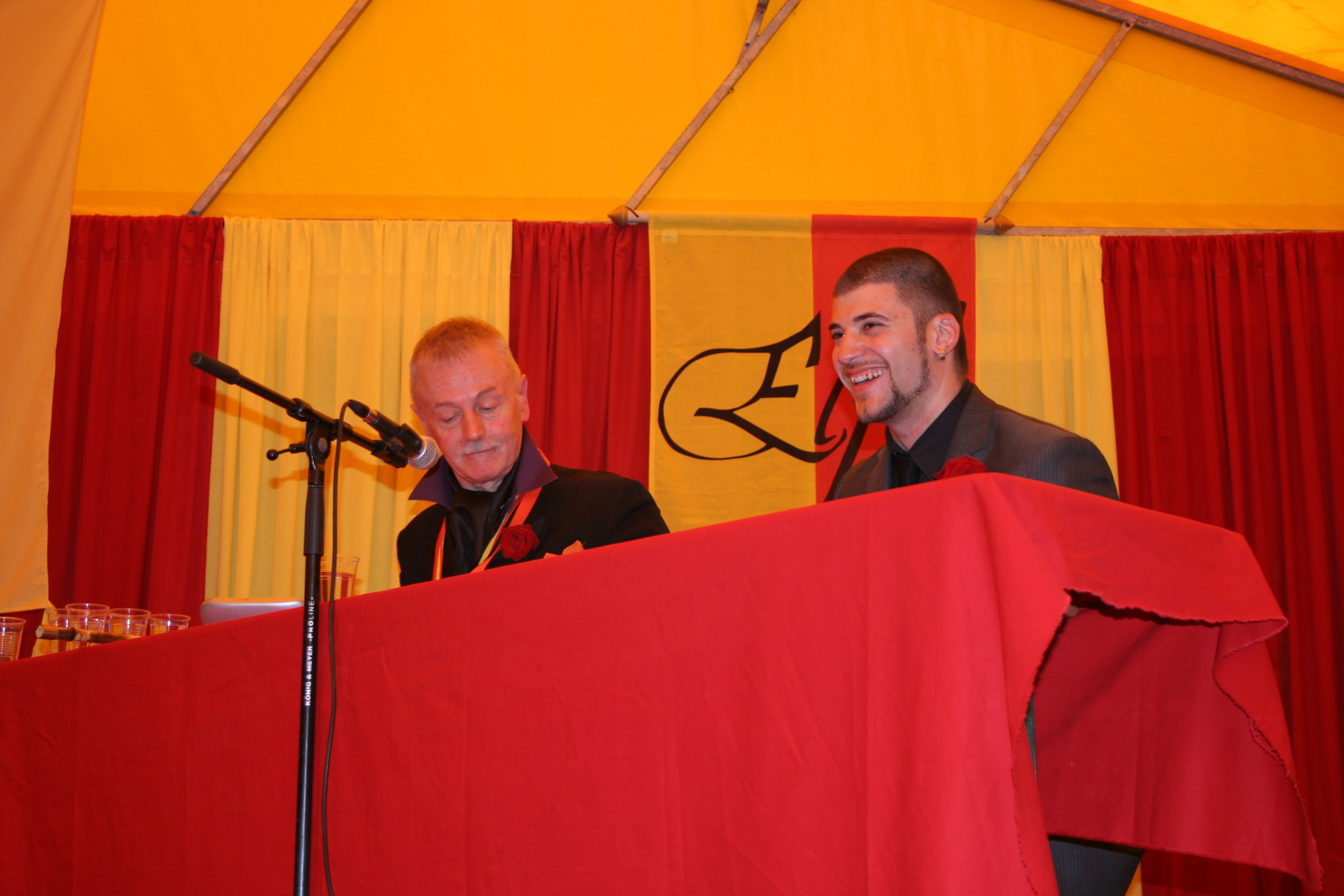
Roland Rotherham (on the left) at the Elf Fantasy Fair in 2010

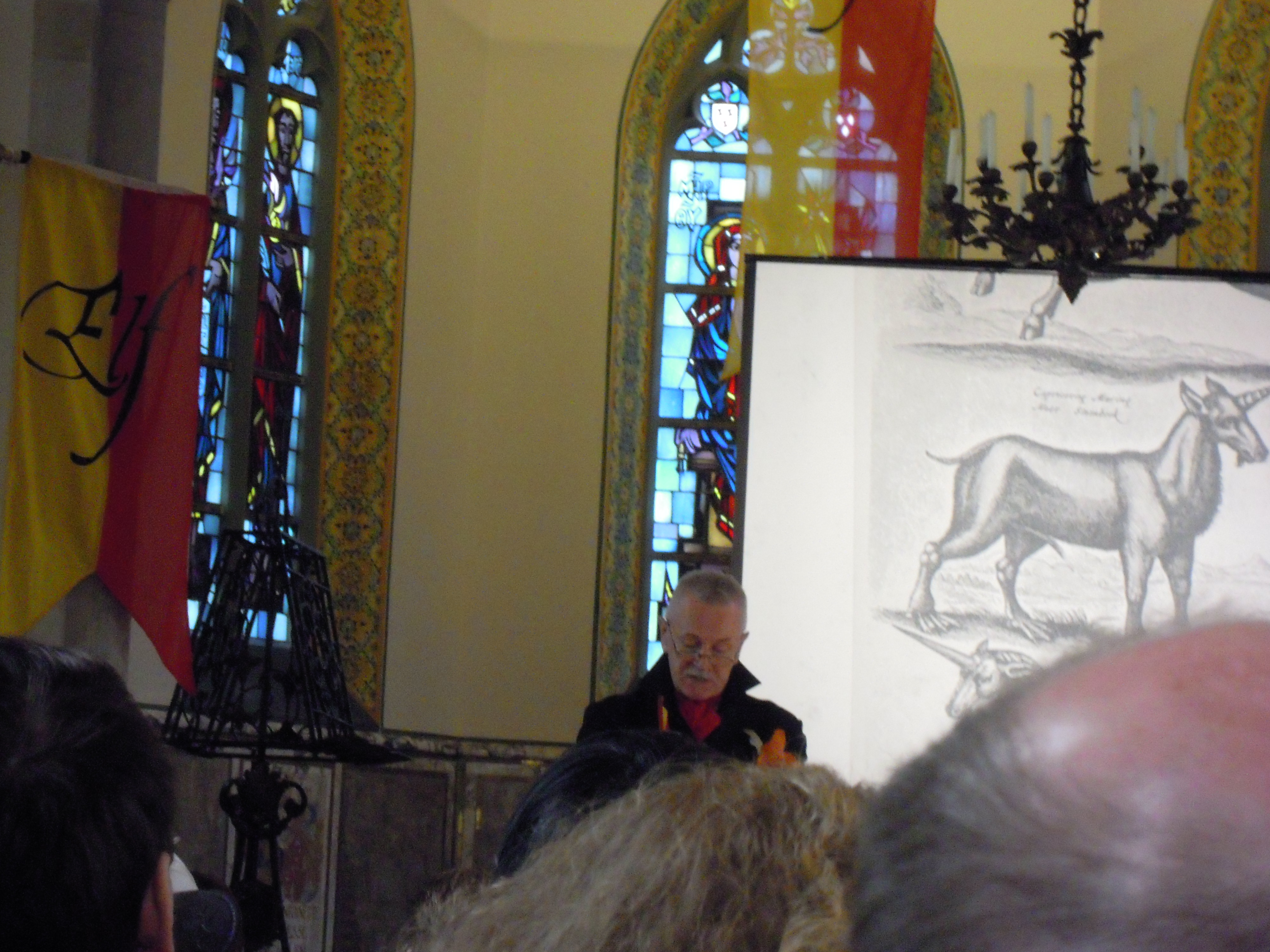
Roland Rotherham lecturing at the Elf Fantasy Fair in 2011

Roland Rotherham is a retired British writer and lecturer, specializing in medieval legends and lore (especially those related to King Arthur, Merlin and Glastonbury) and historical cookery. He is credited to having multiple degrees in ancient and medieval studies and theology.

In the Netherlands, he lectures at fantasy events, such as the Elf Fantasy Fair at Castle de Haar and the Midwinter Fair at the Archeon.

Rotherham is Knight-Seneschal (equivalent to Grand-Master) of the Order of the Fellowship of the Knights of the Round Table of King Arthur. He is also a member of the Institute of Heraldic and Genealogical Studies and the Experimental Food Society.
