= My One and Only (Bones song) =

Song written by Lynsey de Paul

"My One and Only" is a song written by Lynsey de Paul and first recorded by the female vocal trio Bones. It was released as a single in 1974 in the UK on Jet Records (the second release from the label), and on Polydor in France, Germany and Italy. The recording was produced by de Paul. The song is about a summer holiday romance and is influenced by the style of 1960s girl groups such as the Shangri-Las. It received favourable reviews from the U.K. press, with comments such as "are tipped as the girlie trio most likely to succeed in 1975 they've got everything in their favour"

Bones performed the song on British television as guests on the Granada TV programme, Rock On With 45, on 16 January 1975. The B-side of the single, “Baby Don’t Make Me Cry”, was a doo-wop sounding song co-written by de Paul and Barry Blue, and again it was produced by de Paul. The single was re-released in September 1976, again to favourable reviews.

Bones had three members – American Jacquie Sullivan, Suzanne Lynch (born Sue Donaldson, originally half of the Chicks duo with sister Judy) and Joy Yates (the latter two both from New Zealand). They performed with Neil Sedaka at the Royal Festival Hall in his 1970s comeback concert, which was later released as a live album. Bones provided back-up vocals on the UK pop TV programme Get It Together for some of the UK's biggest stars of the 1970s, and they appeared on the show singing the song. De Paul also recorded a version of the song for her shelved 1976 album, Before You Go Tonight, and it was finally released on this album in 1990, as well as on her album Best of Lynsey de Paul.
