= Hollywood Romance =

Song by Lynsey de Paul and David Jordan

"Hollywood Romance" is a song written by Lynsey de Paul and David Jordan. It was released as a single on Polydor Records on 20 October 1978 in a picture sleeve, almost six years to the day after the release of their last hit collaboration "Getting a Drag", and it was play-listed on BBC Radio 1. The record label for this single was unusual in that it was printed in silver instead of the usual Polydor red label. The release was announced in a full page advert "Hollywood Romance - a new single from a very special lady" published in Music Week. In Japan, it was released in February 1979 in the same picture sleeve cover with the title in Japanese added, plus the lyrics were included on the back cover. It was listed as a major release in Hong Kong. It was also released as a track on the 1978 BBC transcription album Servicio Latinoamericano de la BBC vol. 44 (produced for Latin American radio) together with "Don't Take Love for Granted" by Lulu and "Got to Get You into My Life" by Earth, Wind and Fire.

The song name checks a number of classic era Hollywood movies such as King Kong, Last Tango in Paris, The African Queen, Citizen Kane and Tarzan, as well as the popular song "Begin the Beguine", written by Cole Porter that Fred Astaire and Eleanor Powell danced to in the musical film Broadway Melody of 1940. "Hollywood Romance" was influenced by de Paul's move to California in the late 1970s to be with her partner at the time, the actor James Coburn. The B-side to the "Hollywood Romance" single was a blues song that de Paul co-wrote with Coburn, entitled "Losin' The Blues For You". Polydor hosted a launch party in London to celebrate the release of "Hollywood Romance" in a Hollywood style setting complete with Busby Berkeley film clips. The single garnered good reviews with UK music press including the weekly publication, Record Mirror, writing "De Paul is set for a comeback ...with this real eye opener". It was playlisted by BBC Radio 1 and also was played on Singapore's FM radio station.

Both songs were produced by Rupert Holmes for the Holmes Line and they went on to appear as tracks on the Holmes produced 1979 album, Tigers and Fireflies that was recorded at Long View Farm and released by de Paul a few months later on the Polydor record label in 1979. Although it is considered a major de Paul single release, it is one of the few de Paul tracks that has yet to be released on CD, although it is available as a download from de Paul's official online music store. Lena Zavaroni performed her own version of "Hollywood Romance" on episode 2 of her popular Saturday night prime time BBC 1 TV series, Lena Zavaroni and Music, in 1979, with Zavaroni displaying her skills os an impersonator as Moe West, Ruby Keeler and Judy Garland using "Hollywood Romance" to bookend some classic show tunes. It was also featured in the music art book HK Pop Album 101: Part 1 1971-1987.

A Japanese version of the song with the title "Romance" and Japanese lyrics by Ryoko Goshima was released in 1995 by Japanese singer, songwriter Yoshiko Goshima (五島 良子) on her album Froggie. A remastered version of the album was released in 2013 with Japanese lyrics. It also featured as a track on the 2001 Yoshiko Goshima CD Merry-Go-Round where it is listed as "ロマンス" (the Japanese translation of Romance). The Chinese singer Ka Po Lam Lin Jiabao (林嘉寶) covered the song with lyrics by Caron (卡龍) as forth track on her 1981 LP 林嘉寶 with the title "濃情" ("Passionate").

De Paul's version of the song is listed by the BBC's official music website as one of her most played songs on BBC radio, and was recently played in honour of the anniversary of her birthday.
