= My Man and Me =

Single by Lynsey de Paul

from the album Taste Me...Don't Waste Me
- B-side: "Dancing on a Saturday Night"
- Released: 1975
- Genre: Pop
- Length: 3:46
- Songwriter: Lynsey de Paul

Lynsey de Paul singles chronology
"No, Honestly" (1974)	"My Man and Me" (1975)	"Rhythm and Blue Jean Baby" (1975)

"My Man and Me" is a song written, recorded and produced by the British female singer-songwriter Lynsey de Paul for her second album, Taste Me... Don't Waste Me, and released as a single backed with de Paul's smoochy version of "Dancing on a Saturday Night" on 21 February 1975.

== Chart performance ==
It reached the UK top 40 in March 1975 and was de Paul's seventh UK Singles Chart hit. It was listed as one of the best singles of 1975 in the UK music paper Record Mirror. The song also reached No. 23 on the Radio Capital Countdown on 29 March 1975, No. 27 on the Radio Luxembourg singles chart on 1 April 1975 and No. 35 on the NME singles chart. Despite not being her biggest hit, it is rated the most played de Paul song on the BBC. It was also listed as one of the best singles of 1975 by the Record Mirror (at that time known as Record Mirror & Disc).

== Other recordings ==
Notable performances of the song include a live version for The Old Grey Whistle Test, and a live performance on David Nixon's Christmas Magic shown on prime time TV on Christmas Day, plus an appearance singing the song on Top of the Pops on 20 February 1975. De Paul also performed the song on The Russell Harty Show on 14 March 1975, and on the British children's TV programme Magpie. De Paul also performed the song as part of a special televised concert for the BBC. It was included as one of the tracks on the K-Tel 1976 compilation album 44 Superstars, (which reached No. 14 on the UK Albums Chart in 1976) as well as various Polydor compilation albums such as That's When the Music Gets Me, 14 Internationale Hits, Super Dance Party 3 and Pop Pourri.

The song has been released as a cover version by Swedish singer Agneta Munther with Swedish lyrics by Britt Lindeborg on her 1975 album Två sidor; as well as by Japanese duo Beautiful Hummingbird (Mitsuko Koike and Nobuaki Tabata) accompanied by acoustic guitar on their self titled 2013 CD album.

The song title and lyric was altered to "My Girl and Me" on the 1977 single release by ex-the Move member Carl Wayne, which was produced by de Paul. It was given a more bluesy makeover that seems to be a precursor to de Paul's re-recorded version of the song for her 1979 album Tigers and Fireflies. It has since been released on a number of de Paul compilation albums.
