= Sugar Shuffle =

1975 song performed by Lynsey de Paul

"Sugar Shuffle" is a song written by Lynsey de Paul and Barry Blue. It first appeared as the lead-in track on de Paul's album Love Bomb as an ethereal, chilled and dreamy song about nightlife and dating. AllMusic rated "Sugar Shuffle" as one of de Paul's song highlights. Musician and music critic Bob Stanley wrote in The Guardian, "Sugar Shuffle is an especially gorgeous, woozy mid-70s confection, fit to sit at the table with Liverpool Express's You Are My Love".

Although never released as a single in de Paul's UK home market, it was released in edited form as a single in the US, where it was play-listed by radio stations such as KBBC-Phenix and in Japan, where it was backed by the song "Dreams". In the US, de Paul version received positive reviews in Record World ("This English chart vet has racked up an admirable string of hits back home, but her soft sound should appeal to many tastes here as well.") and Cashbox. Most recently it was played on Flaneur Radio: MacArthur Park and France's Radio Nova, played by Bill Brewster.

An updated cover version of the song was released on the 1984 album Cryptograph by the Japanese artist Asami Kobayashi (小林麻美). This version had lyrics by Kobayshi and Yumi Matsutoya. It received the "Best Album" award at the 26th Annual Japan Record Awards (Nihon Record Taisho) and reached the top 10 in the Japanese album chart in 1984. The album was ranked #40 in the 1984 Japanese year end chart. The song was also included on Kobayashi's "Best Collection" album, released in 1986.

The song was released on CD in the US as a track on the Renaissance Records release of Love Bomb in 2010. A remastered version of the de Paul version of the song was finally released on CD on her 2013 compilation CD Into My Music. The song is also a track on the 2020 album, Bob Stanley presents 76 in the Shade, with Martin Ruddock highlighting it as one of the standout tracks, writing in his review of the album "The poolside cool of Lynsey De Paul’s sedate Sugar Shuffle". The album entered the Dutch compilations chart at No. 23 and reached No. 78 on the UK Official Compilations Chart in September 2020.
