= Before You Go Tonight =

Studio album by Lynsey de Paul
- Released: 1990
- Recorded: 1976
- Label: Century Records, Vivid Sound
- Producer: Lynsey de Paul

Before You Go Tonight also known as Take Your Time is a Lynsey de Paul album recorded in 1976 for Jet Records, but shelved out of spite by then manager Don Arden, and not released until 1990. Then it appeared as a CD release in Japan on Century Records, and again on the Vivid Sound (with a different sleeve) under licence from Trojan Records. The album was originally called Singer-Songwriter and was finally released on de Paul's music store as Take Your Time, albeit with a slightly different track listing. All of the songs were written by de Paul, except the amusing "You've Either Got It or You Ain't" (also known as "The Charisma Song"), which was co-written with David Jordan. The album was produced by de Paul. The track "If I Don't Get You The Next One Will" was released as a single in 1976 and this version is included (although a longer version was originally recorded especially for the album). "My One and Only" is de Paul's version of a song recorded and released in 1975 by her label mates at the time, the British female vocal trio Bones.

"Before You Go Tonight" is a de Paul love song written for Ringo Starr. De Paul said of the title track "I wrote the song "Before You Go Tonight" for Ringo Starr when we were dating, but, when he had to go abroad to be a tax exile in the 70s, I could not follow him as I was working in the U.K. - and so we split up. We actually wrote a song together called "E & A", which was about how he could only play two chords on the guitar - namely "E and A"!

"Martian Man" (written about fellow musician Roy Wood because he had green and red hair at the time), had a similar vocal overdub as de Paul's version of "Because", that she released on the Beatles cover album and soundtrack to the film All This and World War II, recorded at around the same time. This song was covered in 1996 by Julianne Regan's group Mice as a track on the "Milkman" EP and was a UK chart hit. It also appeared on their album, New & Improved.

Three of the tracks from this album ("Martian Man", "My One And Only" and Phil Spector girl group influenced "The One Exception") appeared on the 1993 CD compilation album, Best of Lynsey De Paul, which was released in Japan only on the Century record label.

In 1995, essentially the same album was released as a CD in Switzerland and the rest of Europe with the title I Love You, albeit with the tracks in a different order (and also different titles) on the K point label. It was licensed from Tentcrest/The Merlin Group. The 2013 compilation CD Into My Music also contained remastered versions of tracks from this album such as "If I Don't Get You The Next One Will", "Call Me", "They'd Rather Be Making Money", "Before You Go Tonight", "Take Your Time", "You Either Got It Or You Ain't", "Martian Man" and "Do Unto Others".

== Track listing ==
All tracks composed by Lynsey de Paul; except where indicated

A side

1. "Call Me"
2. "They'd Rather Be Making Money"
3. "Before You Go Tonight"
4. "Take Your Time"
5. "The One Exception"

B side

1. "Do Unto Others"
2. "You've Either Got It or You Ain't" (Lynsey de Paul, David Jordan)
3. "If I Don't Get You The Next One Will"
4. "Martian Man"
5. "My One and Only"
