= Gerard Rotherham =

English cricketer

Personal information
- Full name: Gerard Alexander Rotherham
- Born: 28 May 1899; Coventry, Warwickshire, England
- Died: 31 January 1985 (aged 85); Bakewell, Derbyshire, England
- Batting: Right-handed
- Bowling: Right arm medium
- Role: All-rounder

Domestic team information
- Years: Team
- 1919–1920: Cambridge University
- 1919–1921: Warwickshire
- 1928/29: Wellington
- FC debut: 21 May 1919 Cambridge University v Australian Imperial Force Touring XI
- Last FC: 22 January 1929 Wellington v Auckland

Career statistics
Competition	First-class
Matches	65
Runs scored	1,801
Batting average	18.76
100s/50s	0/7
Top score	84*
Balls bowled	9,556
Wickets	180
Bowling average	28.36
5 wickets in innings	8
10 wickets in match	0
Best bowling	7/69
Catches/stumpings	48/–
- Source: CricketArchive, 23 August 2007

Gerard Alexander Rotherham (28 May 1899 – 31 January 1985) was a first-class cricketer for Cambridge University and Warwickshire in England and for Wellington in New Zealand. His uncle, Hugh Rotherham, played first-class cricket in the 1880s.

Rotherham's chief cricket fame was achieved as a schoolboy at Rugby School, where his record as a fast-medium bowler led to him being named as a Wisden Cricketer of the Year in the 1918 edition of Wisden, at a time when first-class cricket was suspended for the First World War. He then went up to Trinity College, Cambridge.

Rotherham's later first-class career lasted only a few seasons. He got a Blue at Cambridge in both 1919 and 1920, when his swashbuckling lower-order batting was almost as valuable as his increasingly wayward bowling. In 1921, he had a full season of county cricket with Warwickshire, and this time the bowling was more valuable than the batting, and he took 88 wickets in the season. But at the end of the season he moved to New Zealand, where he made just a few appearances for Wellington in 1928–29.
