= Rhythm and Blue Jean Baby =

Song performed by Lynsey de Paul

Single by Lynsey de Paul
- B-side: "Into My Music"
- Released: July 1975
- Studio: Lynsey Music Ltd.
- Genre: Pop
- Length: 3:18
- Label: Jet Records
- Songwriter: Lynsey de Paul
- Producer: Lynsey de Paul

Lynsey de Paul singles chronology
| "My Man and Me" (1975) | "Rhythm and Blue Jean Baby" (1975) | "Love Bomb" (1975) |

"Rhythm and Blue Jean Baby" is a song that was written and produced by Lynsey de Paul, and released in July 1975 as her third single on the newly designed yellow Jet Record label in the UK, as a follow-up to the hit single "My Man and Me". It was released on Polydor in Belgium, France and Germany (with different picture sleeves in each country); backed with another de Paul composition "Into My Music". The release of the single was also announced in the American music industry magazine Cashbox. The song as well as the lyrics and credits are listed on the Italian music resource "Rockol".

== Live performances ==
De Paul performed the song live on BBC TV's Top of the Pops on 17 July 1975, with the show being presented by Dave Lee Travis. It was the tenth song on episode 596 of the show. This episode was thought to have been lost from the BBC archives, but was tracked down in 2013 and found to be in the private collection of record producer and songwriter Ian Levine, along with performances by Elton John, Marc Bolan and T. Rex, Barry White, Diana Ross and various Pan's People appearances. It was the 10th song of this episode, being preceded by David Essex and being followed by Typically Tropical. This version of the song suffered from part of the backing music being omitted. De Paul also performed the song, sat on a motorcycle, rather than at her more usual piano on the BBC1 prime time show "Jim'll Fix It" on 5 July as well as on the Bay City Rollers show Shang a Lang on 7 July 1975. Another TV performance of the song was on "Rock on with 45". De Paul also performed the song as a special international guest on German TV's Die aktuelle Schaubude, where she played it on a gold painted upright piano.

== Release on CD ==
Although originally a non-album single, it was released for the first time on CD on the de Paul album, Greatest Hits, and has since appeared on a number of CD albums such as Best of the Seventies. More recently, it appeared in a remastered form with an additional backing track, giving it a fuller sound, on Into My Music Anthology 1975-1979, where also the B-side "Into My Music" was included as an album track for the first time. Both songs also recently appeared on the MP3 album, Singles Collection 1974-1979.

== Reception ==
The single received favourable reviews, including from DJ and music journalist James Hamilton who, in his first column for Record Mirror, wrote "With a bass line not unlike ‘Bend Me Shape Me’ and some sexy stop/starts, Lynsey makes straight happy pop noises that sound fine to me". It was reported to be a dance floor hit according to a reaction report. Deborah Thomas, music critic at the Daily Mirror wrote "de Paul will captivate her adoring fans with this light, pacey rocker. It was also a Radio Luxembourg "Hot Shot" single as well as a BBC Radio London "Favoured Play" and play listed by BRMB (now Hits Radio Birmingham).

=== Chart performance ===
The song reached no. 16 on the Poporama Swedish chart, and it reached no. 30 and spent two weeks on Capital London Radio's "Capital Countdown chart" (where it was wrongly listed as "Rhythm And Blue Jeans Baby") on 12 July 1975 (now Capital FM). It was also included on the "Disco Top Ten" as a breaker published in the British music industry paper Record Mirror. The song was playlisted on Radio London, BRMB and it was a Radio Luxembourg Hot Shot in June 1975, while still being played on radio stations such as Radio Mi Amigo a year later in 1976.

== Other uses ==
"Rhythm and Blue Jean Baby" was used as backing music for Karlie Kloss at the Sonia Rykiel Spring/Summer 2008 Fashion Show in Paris, France. It still receives radio play, for example in 2018 on the German programme, "Musik á la Carte" and on "radio x - Frankfurter Stadtradio".
