= Tewkesbury Medieval Festival =

Medieval-themed fair near Tewkesbury, England

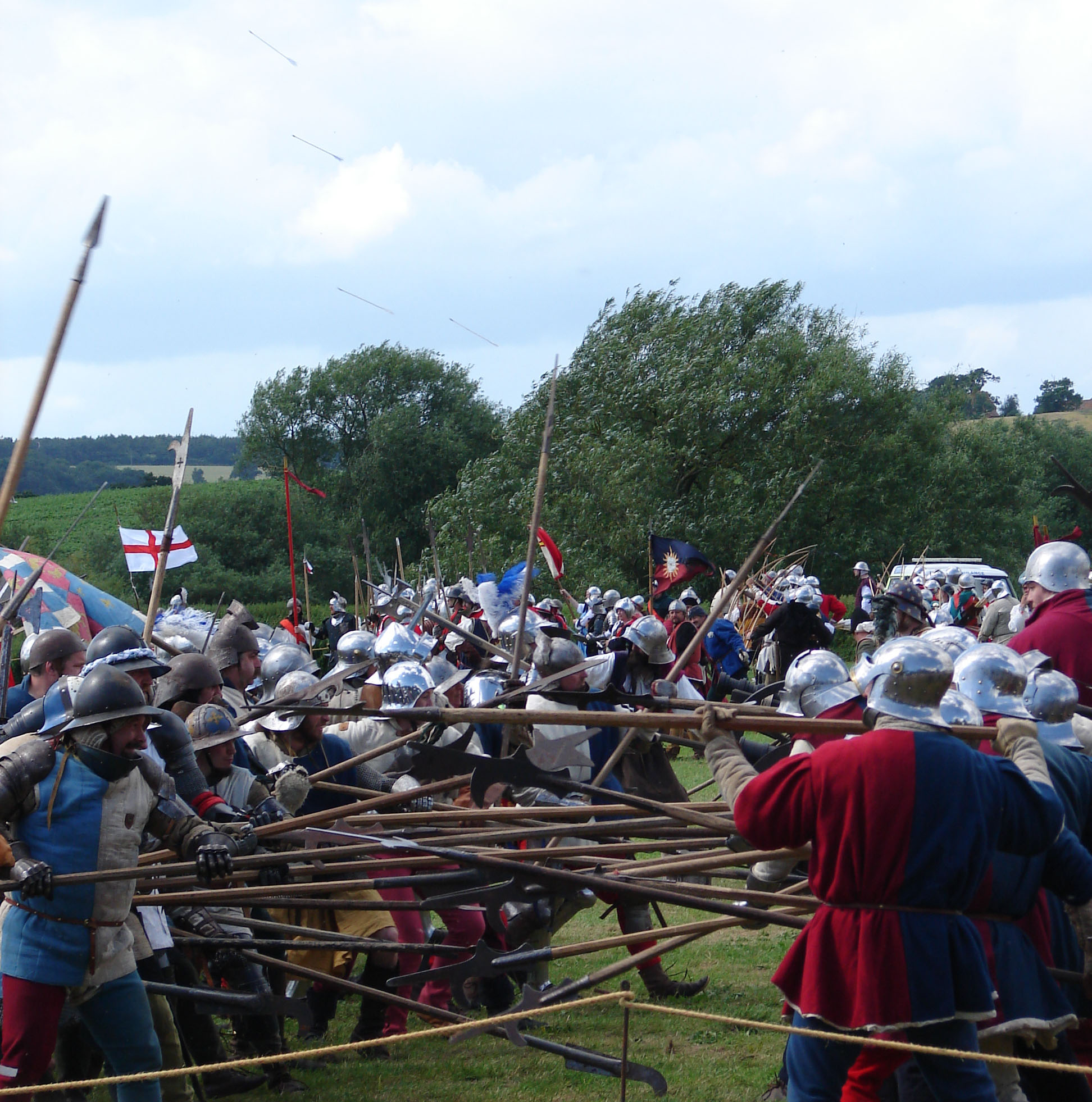
Tewkesbury Medieval Festival's re-enactment of the Battle of Tewkesbury

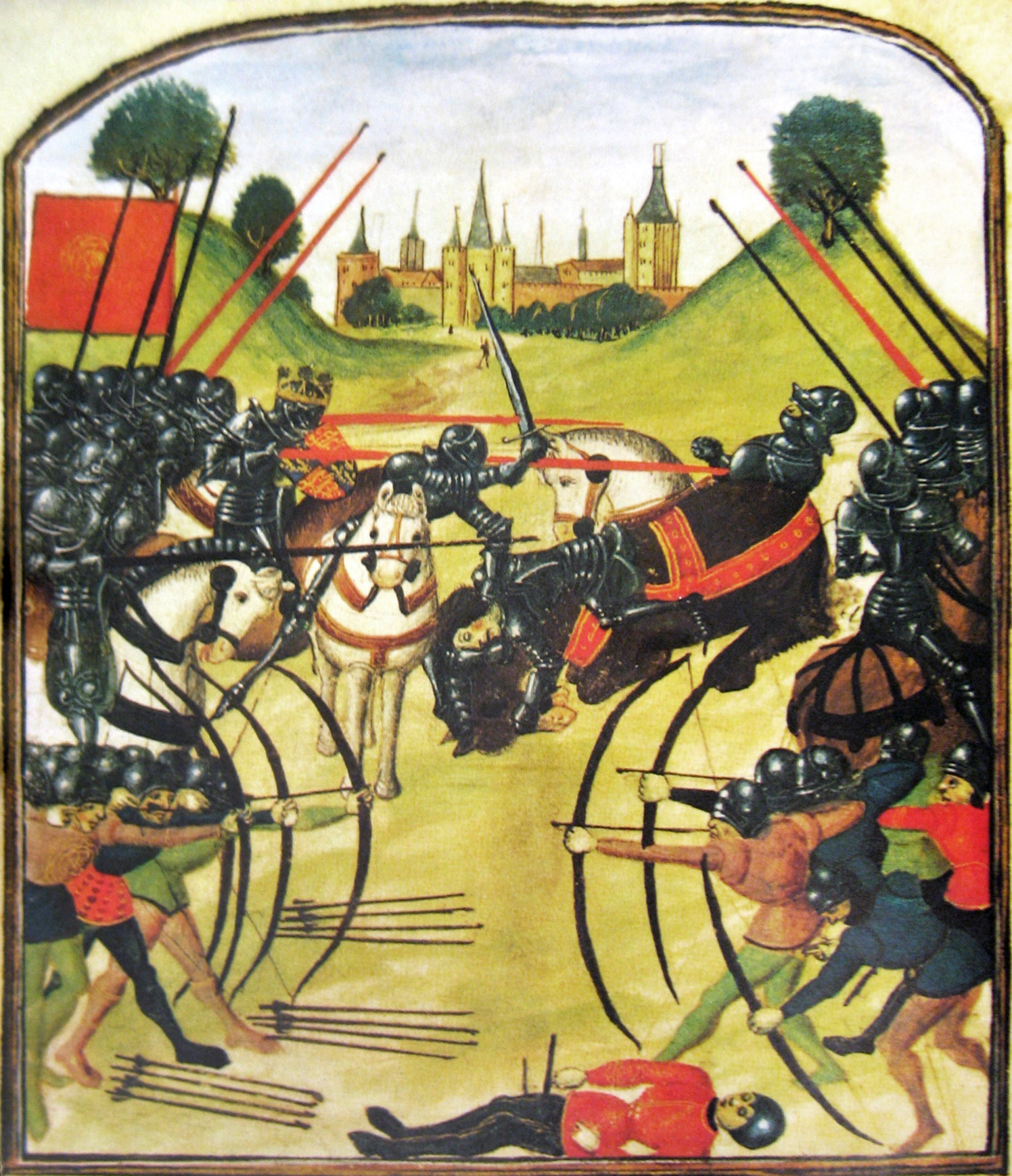
The battle of Tewkesbury, depicted in a Ghent manuscript

The Tewkesbury Medieval Festival is a medieval fair held over the second weekend of every July near the town of Tewkesbury, United Kingdom. Its main feature is the re-enactment of the Battle of Tewkesbury, which was fought in 1471. Located on parts of the ground where the original battle was fought, the festival also features a medieval camp, in which traders ply their wares and visitors are entertained by musicians and acrobats. The largest medieval fair in the United Kingdom, the Tewkesbury Medieval Festival was listed in Footprint England as one of the "ten most bizarre festivals" in the country.

== Background ==
The Tewkesbury Medieval Festival was an original idea of then husband and wife, Len and Peggy Clatworthy, in 1984. They were joined by a small group of others including Rachael Mason as a simple fair with 10 stalls, a beer tent, and a small-scale re-enactment of the Battle of Tewkesbury, the town of Tewkesbury, United Kingdom. The festival became a regular celebration held over the second weekend of every July on parts of the original battlefield. In 2005, the organisers—a group of local re-enactors named the Companions of the Black Bear—registered the event as a company to facilitate the application of grants and their protection. Besides the re-enactment and the camp, the festival offers guided walks of the battlefield. Since its start, the event has expanded to become the largest medieval fair in the United Kingdom. Attendance of the festival is open to all, but participation as a re-enactor is by invitation only. The sight of hundreds of men dressed as medieval soldiers and fighting in a battle led Footprint England to list the event as one of the "ten most bizarre festivals" in the country.

== Re-enactment of the Battle of Tewkesbury ==
The festival's main feature is its re-enactment of the Battle of Tewkesbury, which was fought on 4 May 1471 between the Houses of York and Lancaster. The engagement was a decisive victory for the Yorkists and their leader, King Edward IV. The forces of the House of Lancaster were decimated, and their leaders killed or captured, leaving Edward as the unchallenged ruler of England. Several Lancastrians fled the battlefield and sought sanctuary at Tewkesbury Abbey. The Yorkists stormed the abbey, captured their foes, and executed them.

The re-enactment at the first festival was a simple affair compared to later years: approximately 100 local enthusiasts, kitted out in crude imitations of medieval gear, fought each other on the fields of Tewkesbury. They wore woollen mail or armour made of fibreglass. Their swords and pole arms were made from wood; arrows were rolled-up wallpaper. As the festival became more popular over the years, the scale and quality of the re-enactment changed. Re-enactors from other parts of the United Kingdom joined the event, as well as those from Poland, Germany and other European countries. The armour and weapons used in the later years were faithful steel reproductions that could cost thousands of pounds sterling (£). By 2002, the Battle of Tewkesbury was re-enacted by approximately 2,000 men and women, and the British Broadcasting Corporation called the next year's re-enactment the largest in Europe. Aside from the battle, the storming of Tewkesbury Abbey is also re-enacted during the festival. The subsequent trial and execution of the prisoners are acted out in a mock fashion.

== Medieval camp ==
Since 2002, the festival has been more than a small setup of stalls. It has grown to be a camp of up to 120 stalls, where life in medieval times is enacted by participants of the battle and their families. The beer tent is a regular fixture, and the stalls peddle herbs, sweets, and food. Entertainers, such as acrobats, fire-eaters, and jugglers, wander the area, performing their arts. Musicians and dancers also entertain visitors. Re-enactors demonstrate pottery, yarn spinning, and other medieval craft. Many enthusiasts come from foreign countries, such as Belarus and Hungary. The German Mittelalter rock band Schelmish has performed several times at the festival. Short bouts of simulated duels are performed in the camp and a jousting tournament was also featured. The festival has attracted visitors from as far as New Zealand and the west coast of the United States; the local tabloid quoted an estimate of 25,000 visitors to the festival in 2003.

== Town of Tewkesbury ==
Although the town council of Tewkesbury plays no part in organising the festival, it has supported the event by giving it grants (the amount for 2005 and 2008 was £1,000 each). Most of the money for organising the festival is recouped from "tithes paid by the [stall holders]", which at times proved insufficient to cover the expenses; the event was operating in the red for 2002–2004. Under encouragement from the Companions of the Black Bear and the Chamber of Commerce, the town's traders support the event by decorating their shops and dressing up in medieval-period costumes. The pubs and restaurants serve medieval-style fare as well. A free bus service connects the town and the festival.

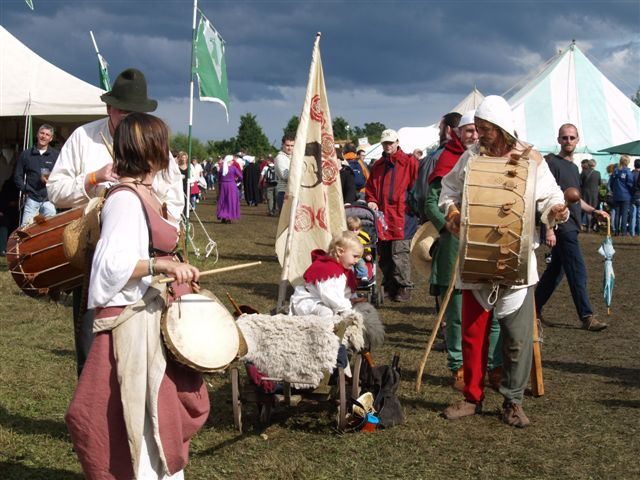
Entertainers at the festival

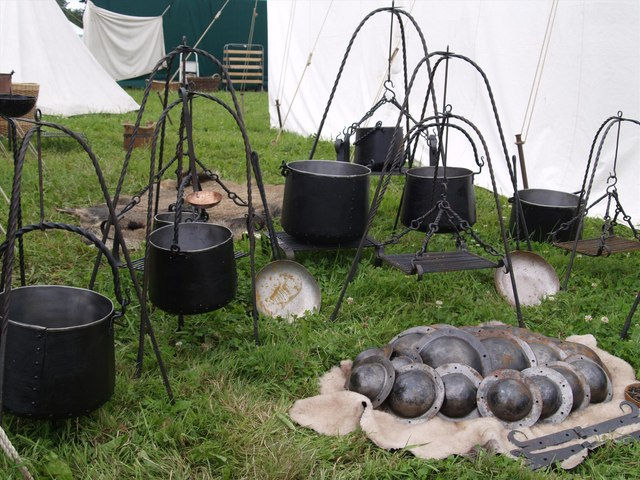
Facets of medieval life

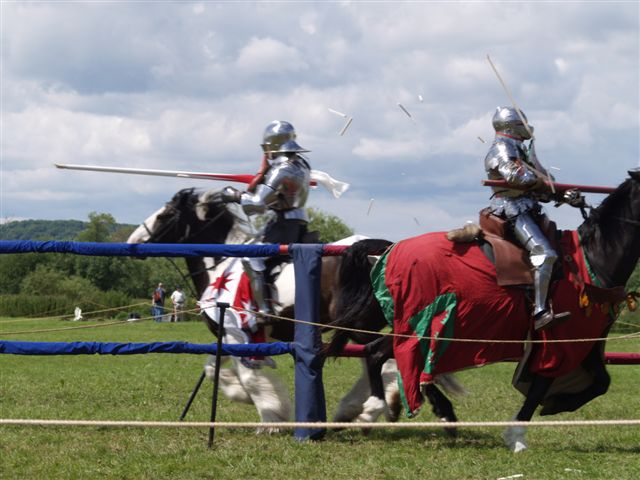
Jousting

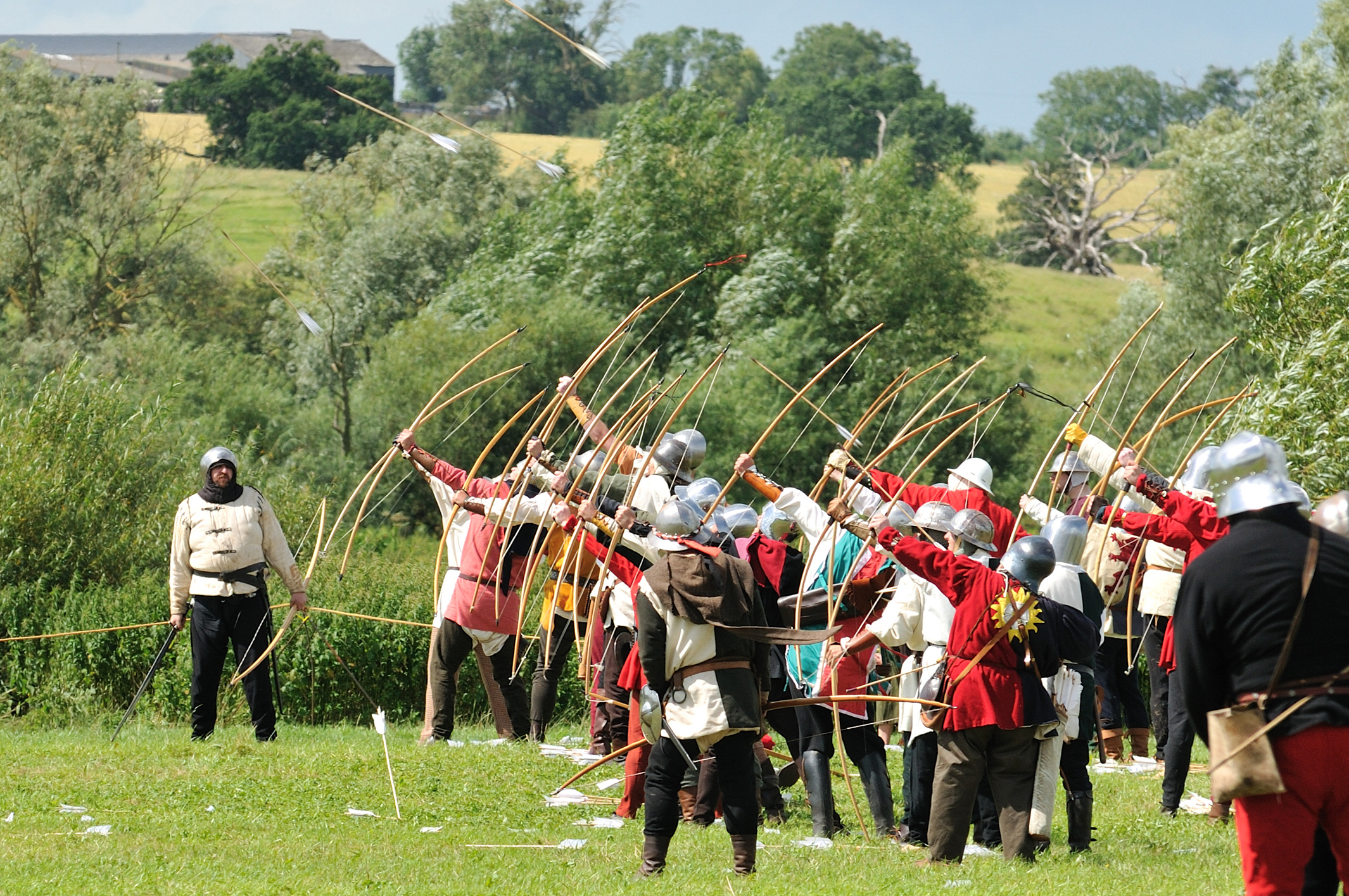
Re-enactment of the missile exchange

== See also ==
- Castlefest
