= Castlefest =

Dutch fantasy festival

Coordinates: 52.267698°N 4.540143°E

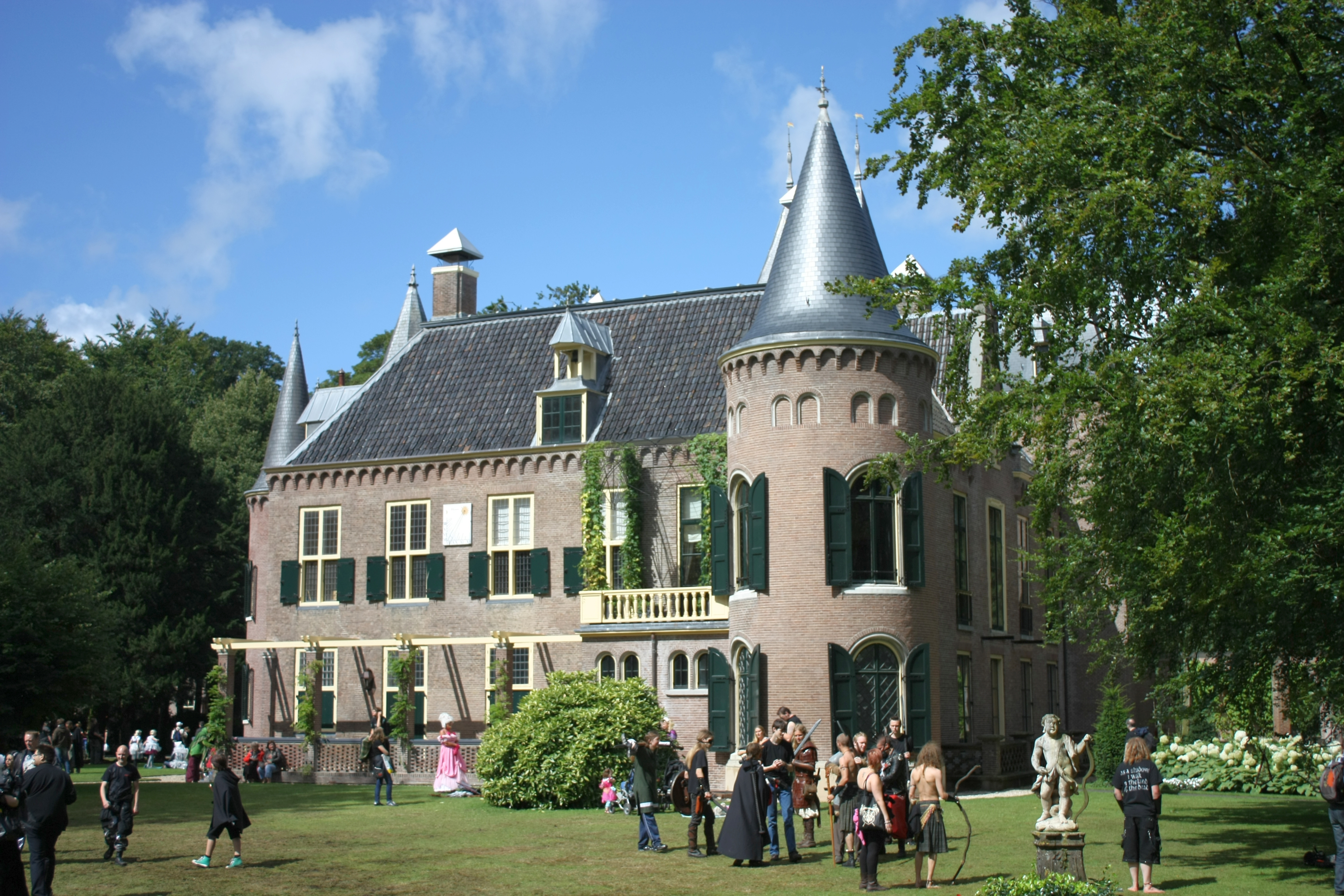
Castle Keukenhof during Castlefest 2011

Castlefest is a medieval/fantasy festival in the Netherlands, held in the gardens of Castle Keukenhof in Lisse since 2005.

== History ==
During the first edition in 2005, 3,500 visitors attended the event, in 2007 the festival attracted 16,000 visitors and in 2011 more than 24,000 visitors entered the gates of Castlefest. In August 2015 the festival attracted a record number of 35,000 visitors. At the 14th edition in 2018, more than 40,000 people attended the festival. Because of the COVID-19 pandemic in the Netherlands, the 2020 and 2021 editions were cancelled. The 2020 edition was replaced by a three-day online event with music and guests, and the regional television station TV West aired a programme looking back at the 2019 edition.

Along with the Wave-Gotik-Treffen in Leipzig, Germany, Castlefest has played an important role in the establishment of a community for neopagan music in Europe.

== Activities ==
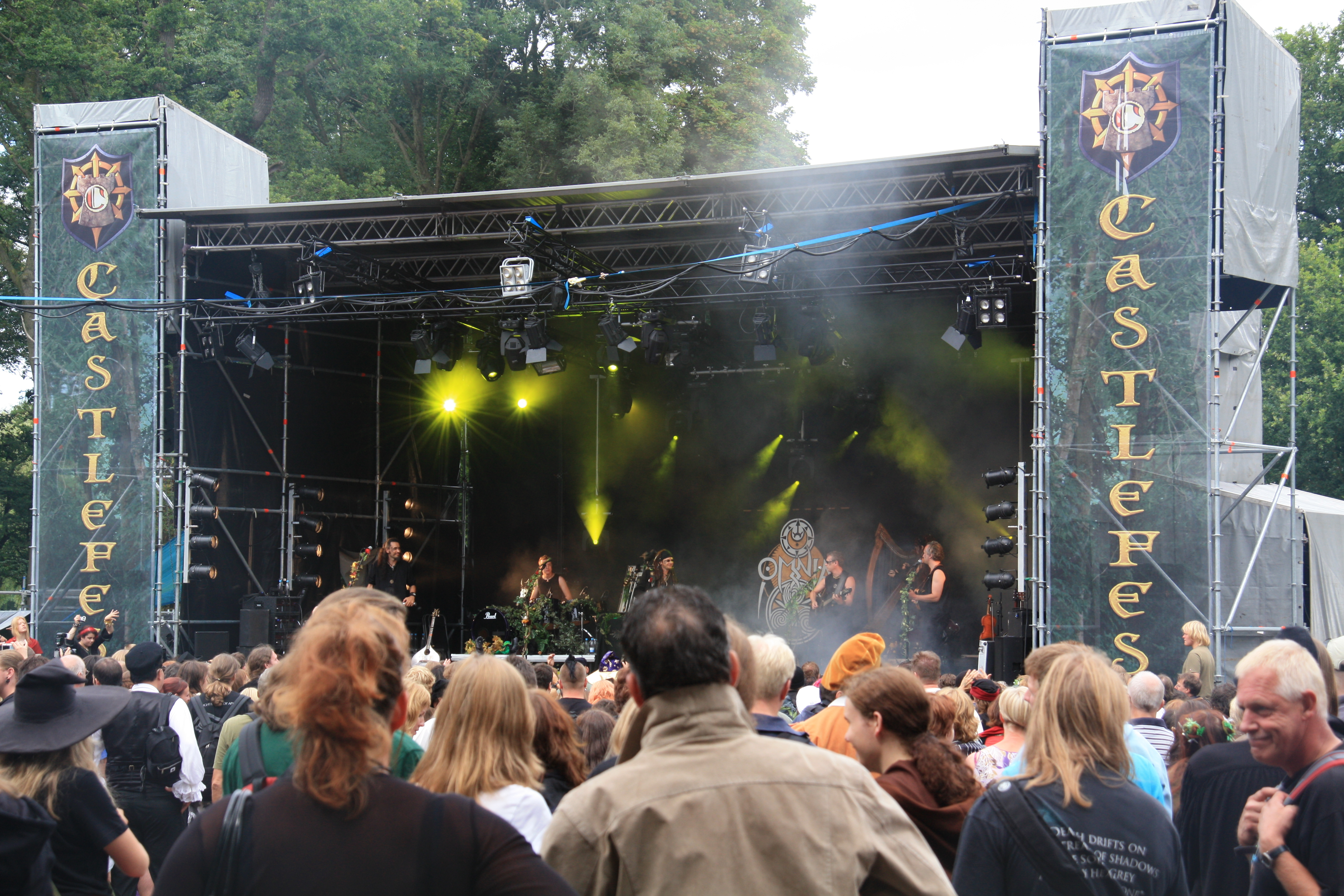
Omnia performing at Castlefest 2009

Castlefest is held on the first weekend of August in the gardens of Castle Keukenhof in Lisse, the Netherlands. It takes part during three days on Friday, Saturday and Sunday with an opening concert on Thursday (since 2011). There are several folk and neo-medieval bands performing each year at the festival. In addition to music, there are workshops, stands with medieval food and drinks, medieval dancing and writers of fantasy literature present. The festival is based on the Celtic feast of Lughnasadh and Saturday night is the Pagan Night (most notable for the wicker burning each year).

== See also ==
- Elfia Fantasy Fair
- Renaissance fair
- Tewkesbury Medieval Festival
