= Rotherham Town F.C. =

Rotherham Town F.C. was the name of two football clubs:

- Rotherham Town F.C. (1878), a member of the Football League 1893-1896
- Rotherham Town F.C. (1899), merged with Rotherham County F.C. to form Rotherham United F.C.
