= Archeon, Netherlands =

Open-air living museum in Alphen aan den Rijn, Netherlands

Archeon
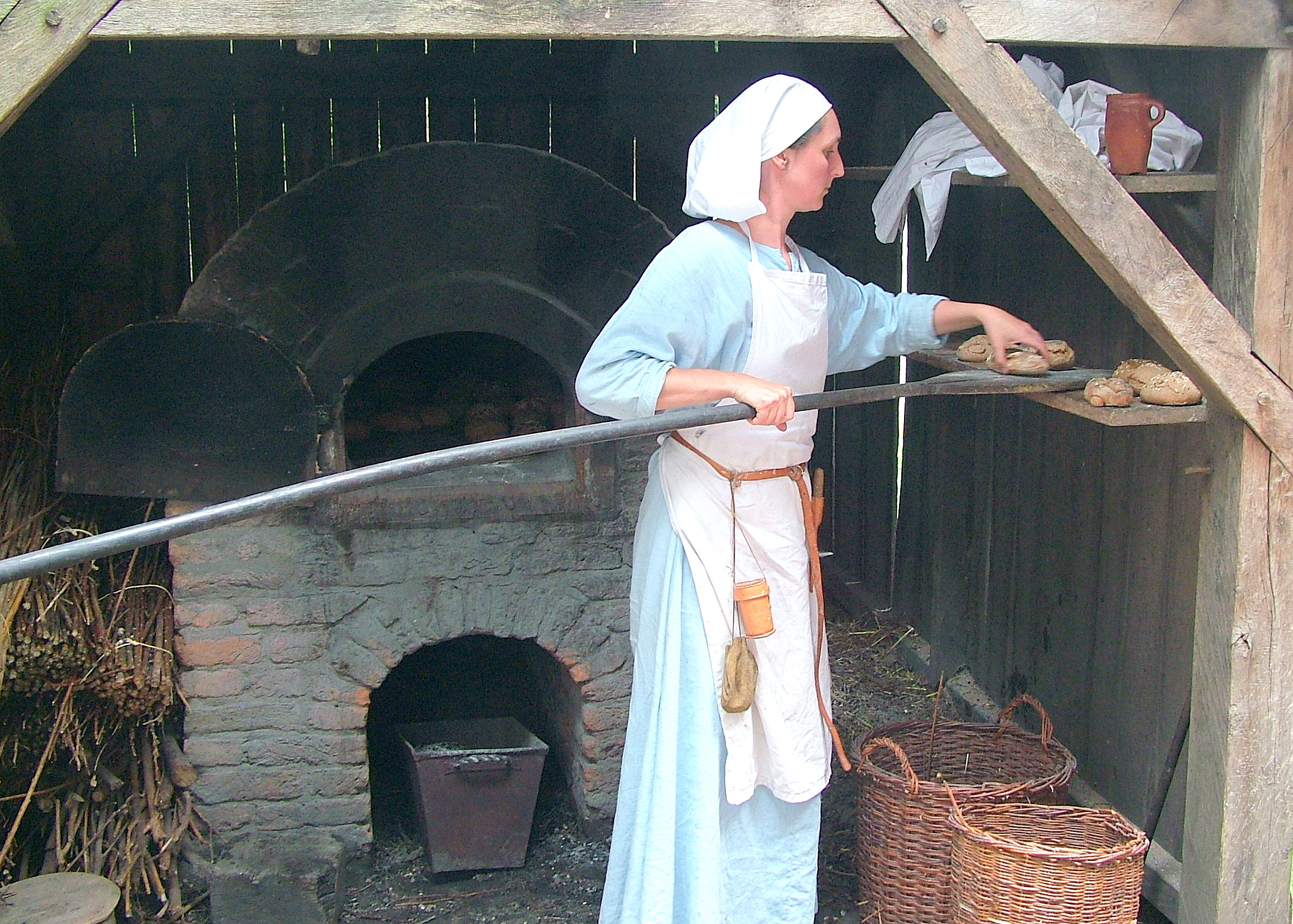
- Archeon medieval bakery
- Interactive map of Archeon
- Location: Alphen aan den Rijn, Netherlands
- Coordinates: 52.114928°N 4.650462°E
- Opened: 1994
- Theme: archeology, stone-age, Roman period, middle-ages
- Attendance: 300.000
- Website: https://www.archeon.nl/index.html

Archeon is an archeological open air and living museum in Alphen aan den Rijn, Netherlands.

== Background ==
Archeon opened as a theme park in 1994, with a focus on demonstrating archaeology to the public. It quickly underwent financial trouble and was on the brink of bankruptcy in 1995. However, it recovered and then evolved into an open air museum, reconstructing various eras from Dutch history. In 2011, the South Holland House of Archaeology was opened, (in Dutch: Archeologiehuis Zuid-Holland). Under the management of Archeon and located at its entrance, it exhibits various archaeological discoveries in the area. In 2015, Archeon was recognised as a formal museum and under the management of the Archeon Museum Park Foundation (in Dutch: Stichting Museumpark Archeon)

== Current Activities ==
The museum features various historical periods of Dutch history via archeological reconstructions and historical reenactments. Educated actors called archeo-interpreters inform visitors about the living circumstances at those days. Visitors can engage in activities. Among the periods portrayed are the Stone Age, the Roman times and the Medieval period. A restoration yard with original wooden ships from the Roman period, found at Zwammerdam, is part of the collection. The museum also contains an arena, where reenactments of Roman gladiator fights are held.

Archeon was and is host to several festivals such as the Midsummer Fair, the Midwinter Fair, the Roman Festival and the Elf Fantasy Fair.

== Collection selection ==
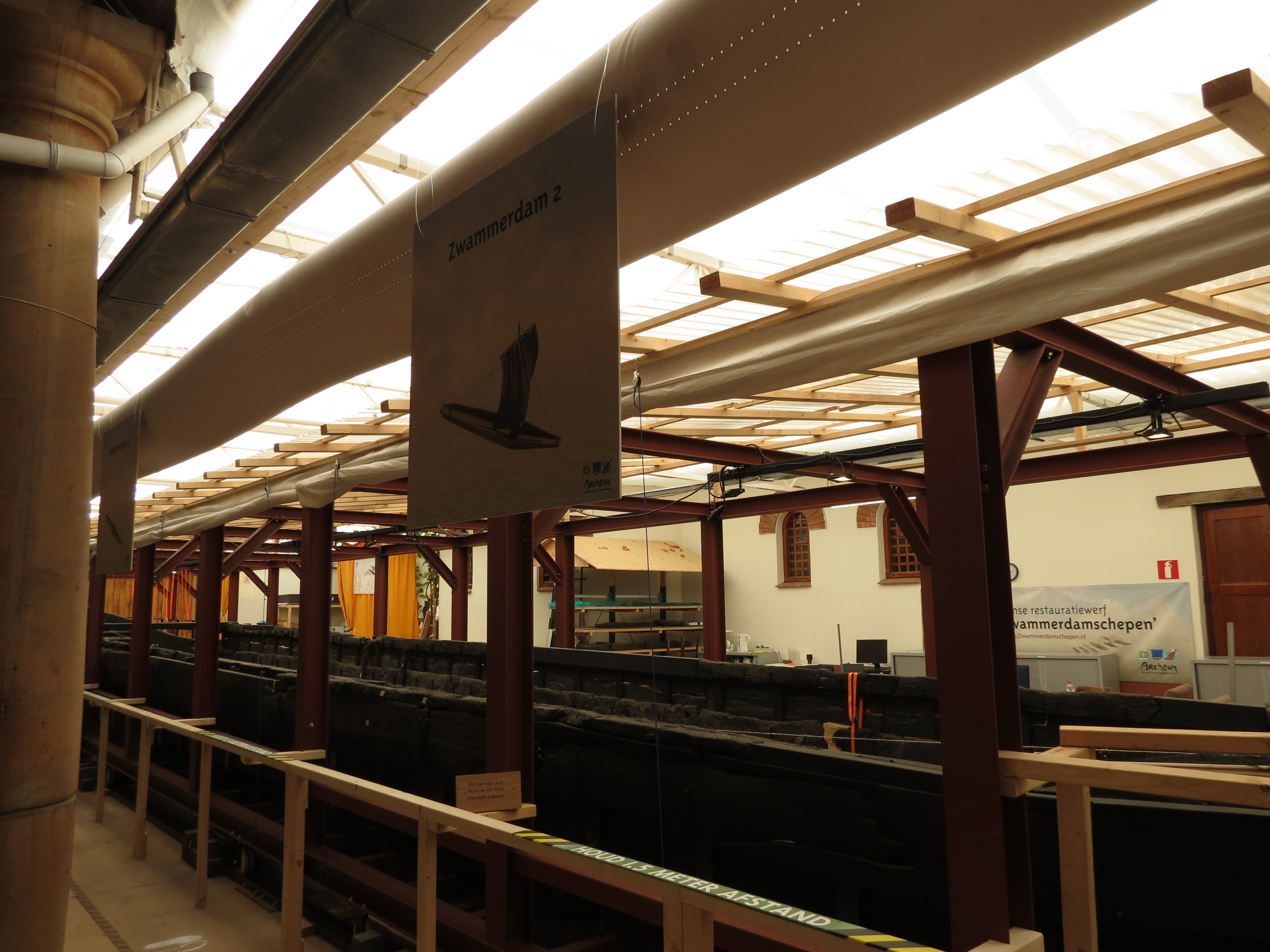
Restoration yard with Roman ships

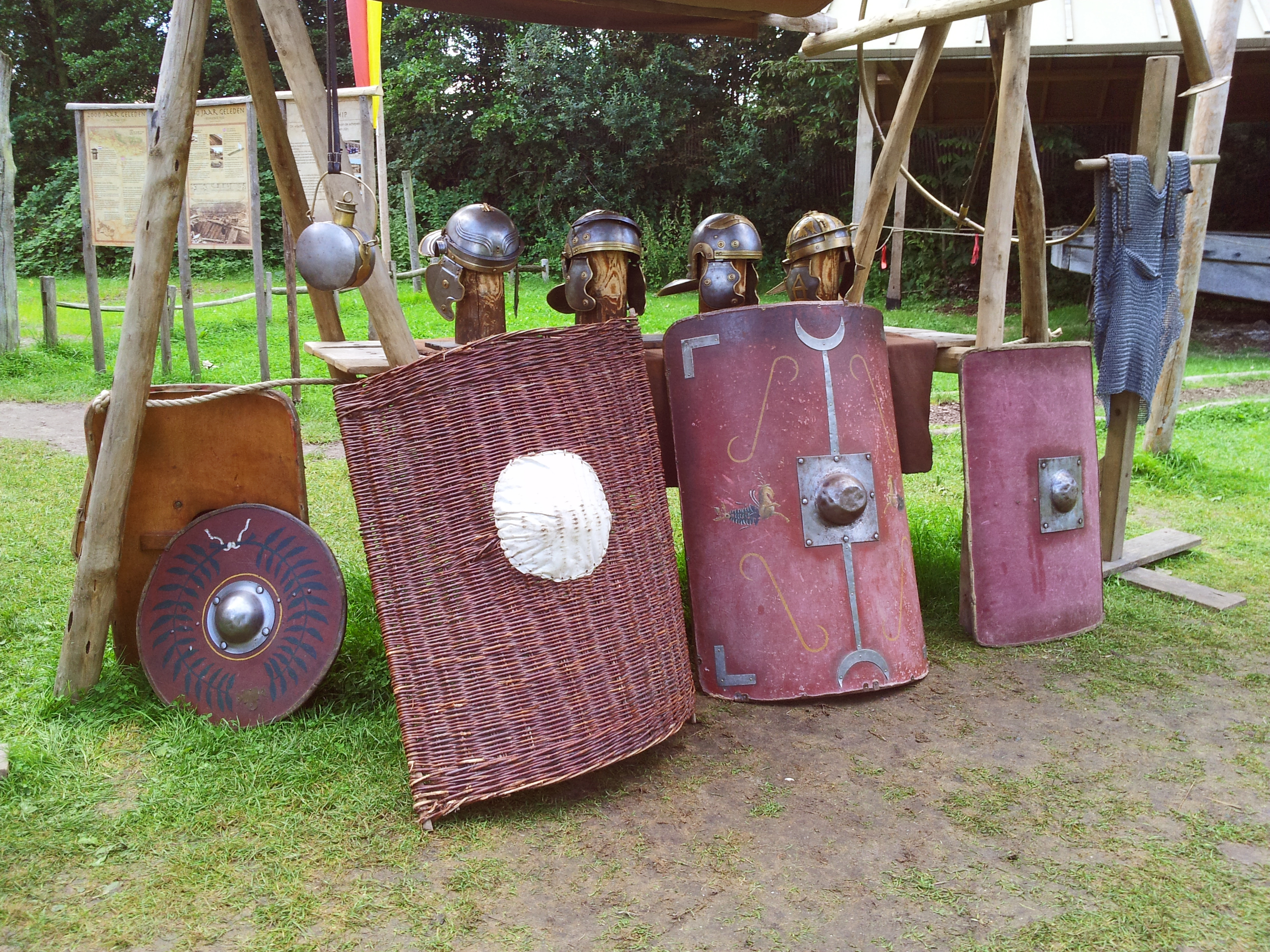
Roman shields and helmets (replica)

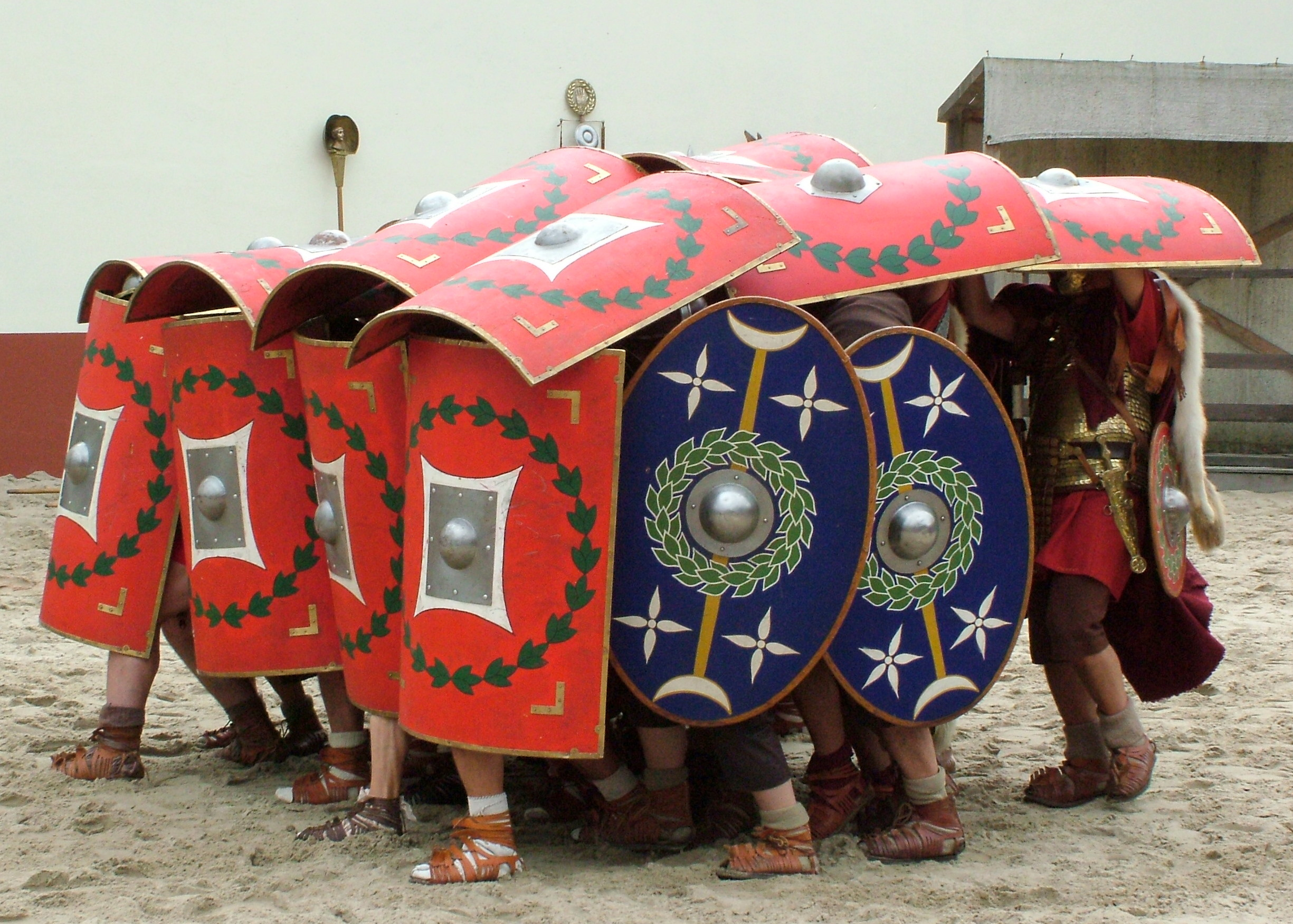
Roman fight technique Testudo

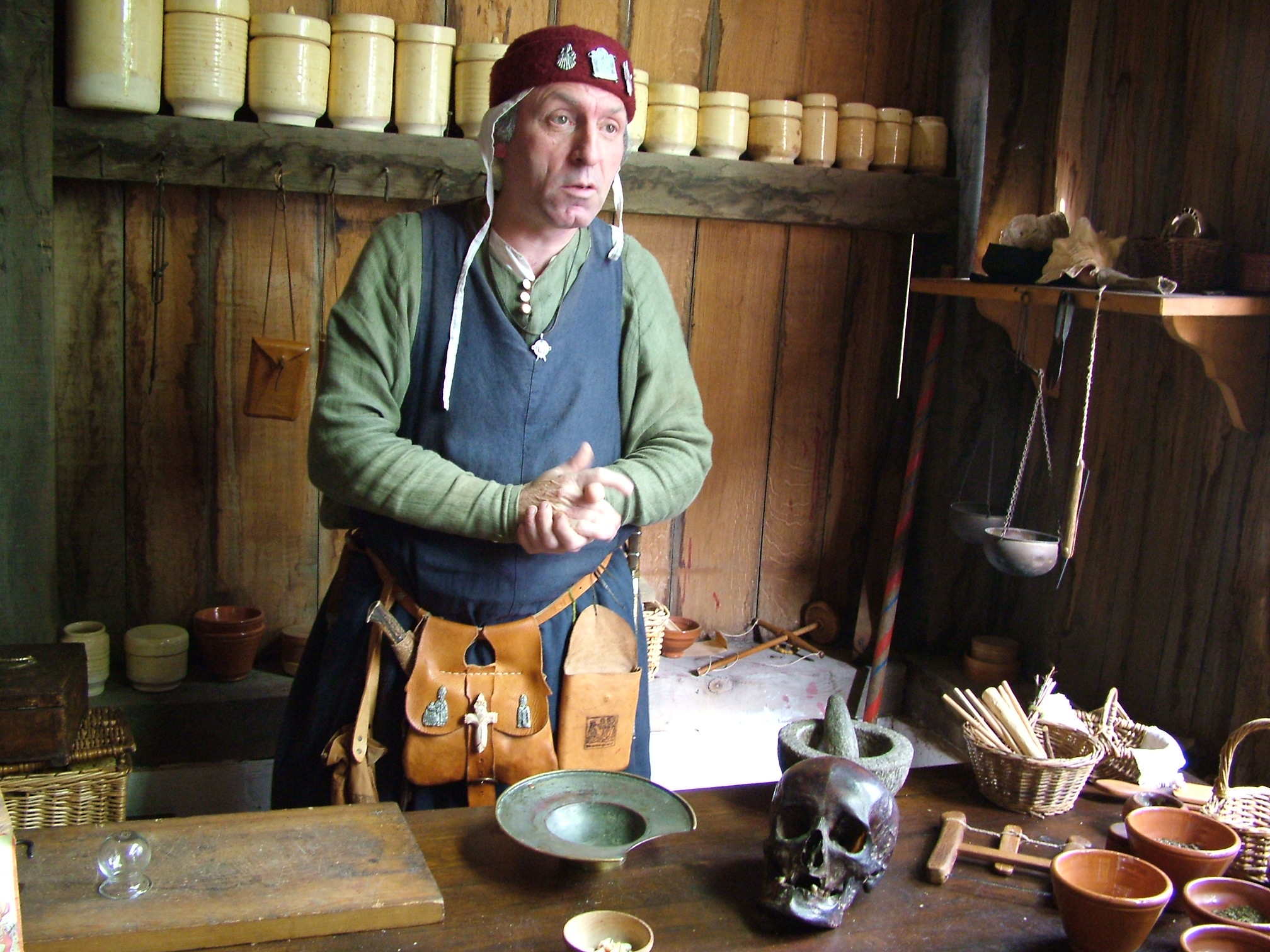
Medieval pharmacy with re-enactor

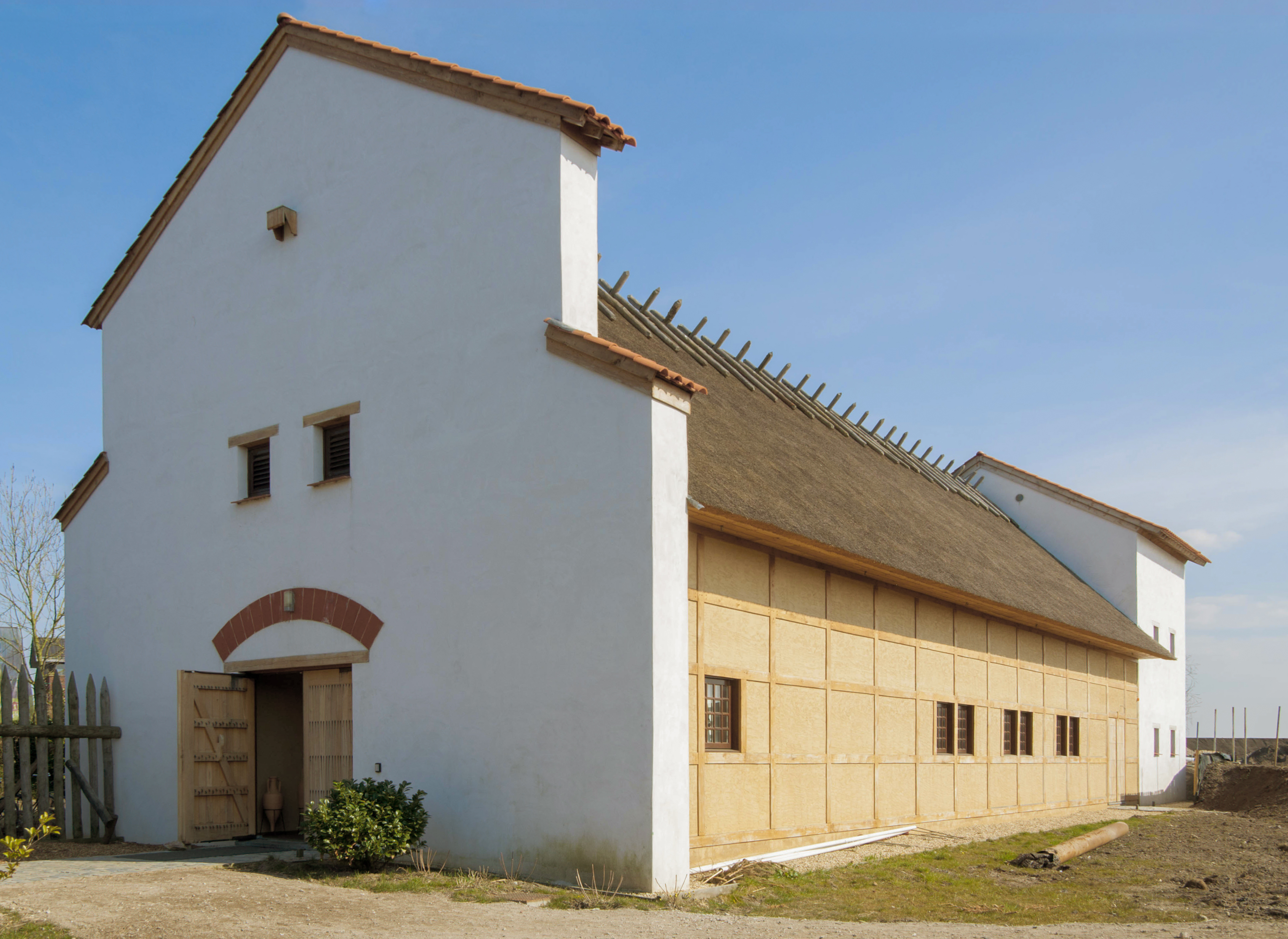
Reconstructed Roman Villa Rijswijk

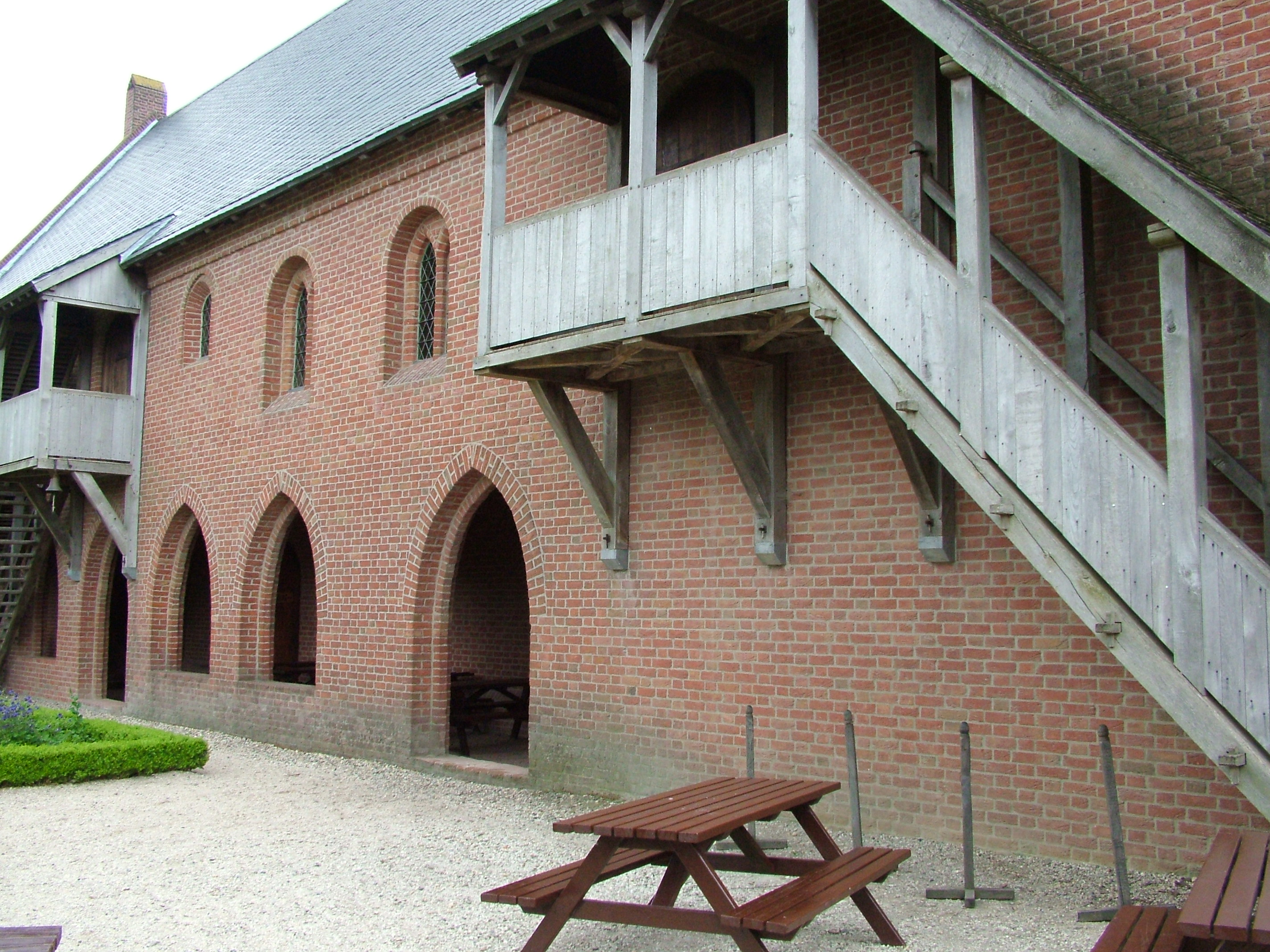
Monastery

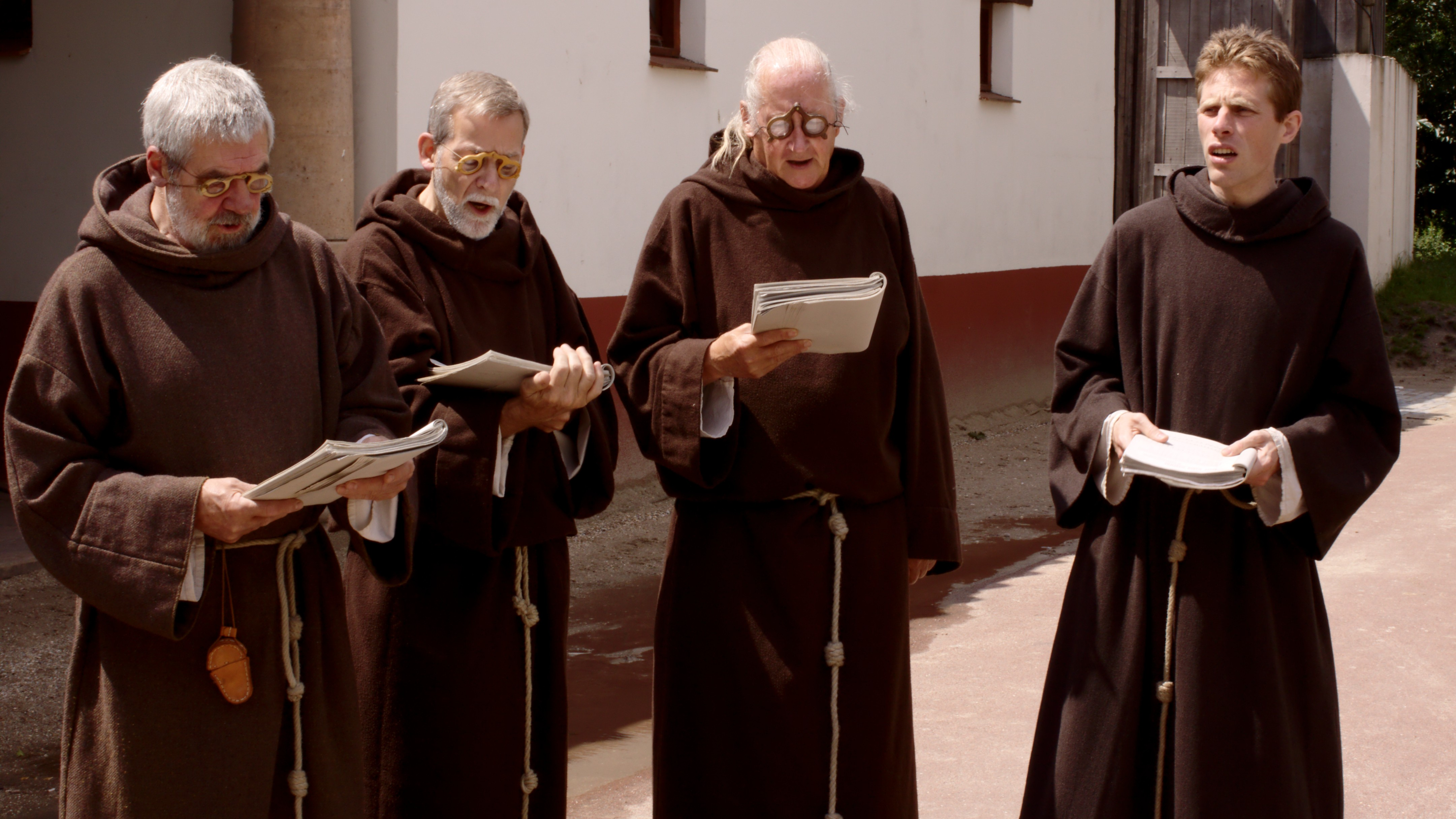
Singing monks

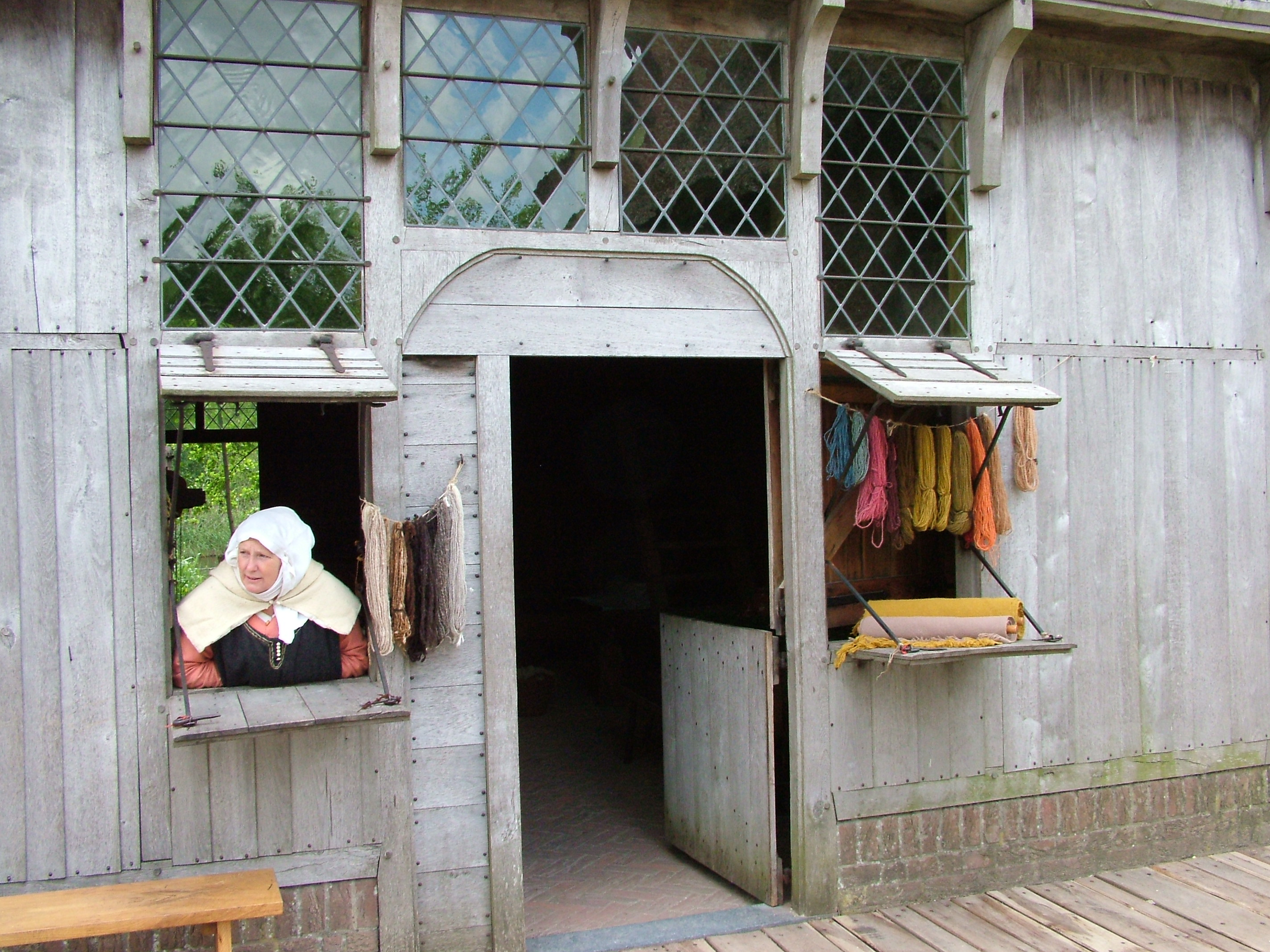
Medieval shop with re-enactor

== See also ==
- Netherlands Open Air Museum at Arnhem
- Zuiderzee Museum at Enkhuizen
- Zaanse Schans at Zaandam
