= If I Don't Get You the Next One Will =

1976 song performed by Lynsey de Paul

"If I Don't Get You The Next One Will" (ISWC: T0115826782) is a song written, recorded and produced by Lynsey de Paul and released in April 1976 in the UK as her seventh and final single on Jet Records. The B-side of the single was another de Paul song and fan favourite "Season to Season". It was supposed to be the lead single and album taster for the 1976 album Take Your Time, (with the album version being an extended mix) but the album was shelved as part of a dispute between de Paul and Arden, and when it was finally released on CD in 1990 in Japan as Before You Go Tonight, the single version was included.

This humorous and tongue in cheek song relates many of de Paul's negative dating experiences (sample lyric "I’ve been dated and waited until I was blue, I’ve been cheated, mistreated and broken in two, I've been lied to, denied to, till I've had my fill, so, if I don’t get you, well, the next one will"). One well known muse for the song was former boyfriend, Ringo Starr, who missed a dinner date with de Paul. De Paul herself described the song as being about revenge, after Starr missed a dinner appointment with her because he fell asleep in his office. Stylistically, it was quite a departure from previous releases, with prominent use of synthesiser and a sparse arrangement that received positive reviews. At the time, the Record Mirror wrote "Cleverly constructed song with Lynsey's voice playing leap-frog over itself. Uptempo rhythm that winds itself all over the place, following the intricate vocal patterns" with the Hammersmith & Shepherds Bush Gazette also praising the single. Already in the week of its release, the song was one of radio's top spins. The song is listed as one of the hits of 1976 by Parada Hits as well as on the Belgian official charts, Ultratop and Swiss Hitparade site.

De Paul performed this song live on UK prime time TV shows such as The Arrows hosted by the British/American band Arrows on 18 May 1976. She was introduced by band member Alan Merrill. One of De Paul's performances of the song has also been released on DVD. The song still receives occasional radio plays on US radio and most recently in 2023 on Frankfurt, Germany Radio X. It also featured on Beatmakology - the Art and Science of making beats.

== Releases on CD ==
Its first appearance on CD outside of Japan was on the 1994 compilation album, Greatest Hits, released on the Repertoire label and, most recently, the song also appeared on the anthology double album, Into My Music, with one positive review of the anthology mentioning the song as interesting. However, it has also been included on her own Best of Lynsey de Paul, Best of the 70s, as well as on The Singles Collection 1974-1979 and the de Paul album, I Love You. It is listed as one of de Paul's song highlights on the online music site, AllMusic. "If I Don't Get You The Next One Will" was also a track on the US compilation album Glitter Girlz, that featured female glam rock era contemporaries such as Noosha Fox (lead singer of Fox), Dana Gillespie and Fanny.

== Book chapter and citations ==
It also became the title of a chapter in the book and audiobook, Ringo Starr: Straight Man or Joker, by the writer Adam Clayson, which related this and other amusing stories about de Paul and Starr's time together, both of whom were well known for their sense of humour, and also as a four book collection "The Little Box of Beatles". An audio book narrated by DJ Mike Read, and with a chapter entitled "If I Don't Get You, the Next One Will", was released in 2003 on the Sanctuary label. The song is also mentioned in the book The Guinness Encyclopedia of Popular Music as well as in the German book Pop-History Band 3: Duos & Sängerinnen. The story behind the song was also recounted by de Paul herself in an interview for the book The Ringo Starr Encyclopedia, written by Bill Harry. To celebrate Ringo Starr's 84th birthday on 7 July 2024, the U.S. radio station WSND included the song in their playlist "Deep Dive of Ringo Starr".
