= De Broodfabriek =

Dutch convention center

Coordinates: 52.03616°N 4.33084°E

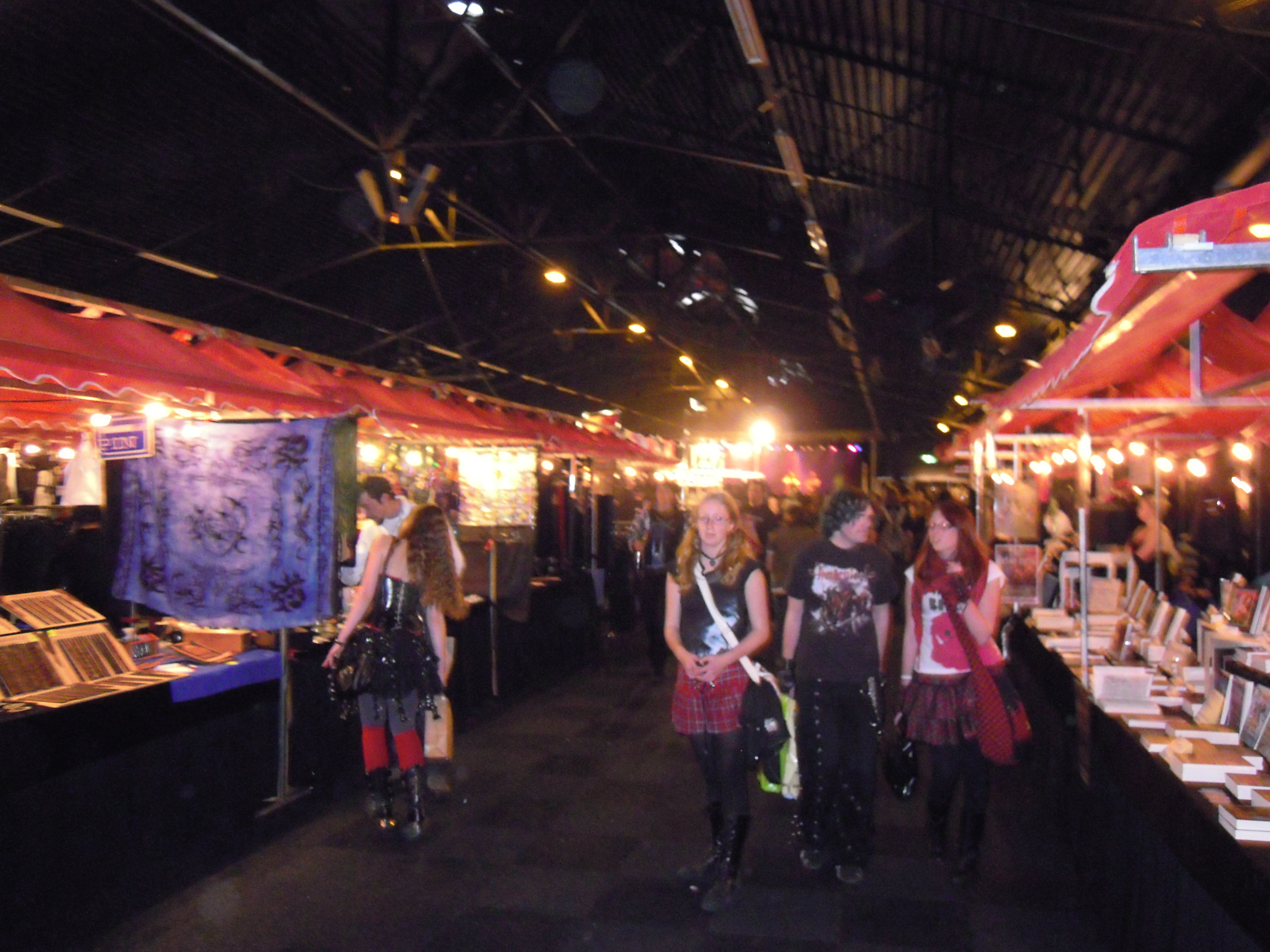
- Gothic & Fantasy Fair at the Beurshal Haaglanden in February 2011
- Interactive map of De Broodfabriek
- Former names: Darling Market, Expo Rijswijk, Beurshal Haaglanden
- Location: Rijswijk
- Owner: Henk van der Straaten († 2012)

Construction
- Opened: 1996

Website
- de-broodfabriek.nl

De Broodfabriek (English: The Bread Factory) is an exhibition and convention center in the Dutch city of Rijswijk. It was founded in 1996 by Henk van der Straaten (co-founder of the former Konmar supermarket chain) as the Darling Market, a recreation of the Paddy's Markets in Haymarket, near Sydney's Darling Harbour, which he encountered during a trip to Australia).

In later years it became known as a venue for many fairs such as the Gothic & Fantasy Beurs (English: Gothic & Fantasy Fair) which is held there since 2003 (as of October 2018 renamed Fantasy Fest.) Since 2019 the festival has expanded from one to two music stages that host international folk artists. The main stage, is Fantasy Fest Stage, presenting larger amplified acts. The smaller stage is the 'Friendly Folk Stage', sponsored by local record label, Friendly Folk Records, it serves as a podium for smaller acoustic acts. The exhibition part of the venue later became known as Expo Rijswijk and after that Beurshal Haaglanden. The current name refers to the building's previous use as a bread factory of Meneba.

The Darling Market was discontinued in 2010.

== See also ==
- List of convention centres in the Netherlands
