= Eleanor (disambiguation) =

Eleanor is a female given name.

Eleanor, Elenore, Elinor, Elinore, Ellinore, Elynor or variations thereof may also refer to:

== Arts and entertainment ==
- "Elenore", a 1968 song by The Turtles
- "Elinor" (song) by Basshunter, 2013
- Elinor, a 1980 album by Zohar Argov, also the title track on the album
- Eleanor (picture book), a biography of Eleanor Roosevelt's childhood by Barbara Cooney
- Eleanor (novel), a novel by Mary Augusta Ward
- Elanor, the name of a flower in J.R.R. Tolkien's fantasy work Lord of the Rings
- Eleanor (automobile), a car in the film Gone in 60 Seconds and a different car in the 2000 remake

== Places in the United States ==
- Eleanor, Iowa, an unincorporated community
- Eleanor, Illinois, an unincorporated community
- Ellinor, Kansas, an unincorporated community
- Eleanor, West Virginia, a town
- Lake Eleanor, a reservoir in Yosemite National Park, California
- Mount Eleanor, a mountain in Alaska

== Ships ==
- USS Eleanor (SP-677), a United States Navy patrol boat in commission from 1917 to 1918
- PS Eleanor (1873), a paddle steamer cargo vessel operated by the London and North Western Railway from 1873 to 1881
- PS Eleanor (1881), a paddle steamer cargo vessel operated by the London and North Western Railway from 1881 to 1902
- Eleanor (sloop), a racing sloop built in 1903
- Eleanor, one of the three tea ships boarded in the Boston Tea Party
- Mission Eleonore, a refugee rescue ship operated in the Mediterranean Sea by Mission Lifeline
- Eleanor (1894), the largest yacht built in America when she was launched, and in World War I, the USS Harvard

== Other uses ==
- Tropical Storm Eleanor, name used for several tropical cyclones
- Eleanor (horse) (1798–c. 1824), British Thoroughbred and the first female horse to win the Epsom Derby
- 2650 Elinor, an asteroid

== See also ==
- Eleonora cockatoo, a parrot
- Eleanora (disambiguation), also Eleonora
- Leonora (disambiguation)
