= Lenore =

Lenore may refer to:

== Arts and entertainment ==
- "Lenore" (poem), by Edgar Allan Poe
- Lenore, an unrelated character in the poem "The Raven", also by Edgar Allan Poe
- "Lenore" (ballad), a 1773 poem by Gottfried August Bürger
- Symphony No. 5 (Raff), a symphony by Joachim Raff entitled "Lenore"
- the title character of Lenore, the Cute Little Dead Girl, a comic series

== Places ==
- Lenore, Idaho, an unincorporated community
- Lenore, West Virginia, an unincorporated community
- Lake Lenore (Washington)
- Lenore Lake (Saskatchewan), Canada

== People ==
- Lenore (given name), a list of people

== See also ==
- Leonore (disambiguation)
- Lenora (disambiguation)
- Lenor, a fabric softener
- Eleanor (disambiguation)
