= Leonor =

Leonor or Léonor is the Spanish form of the given name Eleanor.

People bearing the name include:

- Leonor Acevedo Suárez (1876–1975), Argentine translator and mother of Jorge Luis Borges
- Leonor Allende (1883–1931), Argentine writer and journalist
- Leonor Andrade (born 1994), Portuguese singer and actress
- Leonor Antunes, Portuguese contemporary artist
- Leonor Arfuch (1945–2021), Argentine critic and academic
- Leonor Baldaque (born 1977), Portuguese actress
- Leonor Beleza (born 1948), Portuguese politician
- Leonor Bonilla (born 1970), Mexican actress
- Leonor Briones (born 1940), Filipino academic and civil servant
- Leonor Cecotto (c.1920–1982), Argentine painter and engraver
- Léonor Chabot, French noble and lieutenant
- Leonor de Cisneros (died 1568), Spanish Protestant martyr
- Leonor Cortés Moctezuma, Aztec noble
- Leonor de Almeida Portugal, Marquise of Alorna (1750–1839), Portuguese noblewoman, painter and poet
- Leonor de Alvim, Portuguese noblewoman
- Leonor de La Guerra y Vega Ramírez (died 1816), Venezuelan protester
- Leonor De Ovando, Dominican poet
- Léonor de Récondo (born 1976), French violinist and writer
- Leonor de Velasco Álvarez (1907–1975), First Lady of Colombia from 1926 to 1930
- Leonor Espinoza (born 1998), Peruvian para-taekwondo practitioner
- Leonor Ferrer Girabau (1874–1953), Spanish draftsperson
- Leonor Fini (1907–1996), Argentine surrealist painter
- Leonor Giménez de Mendoza, Venezuelan businesswoman
- Leonor Gonzalez Mina (1934–2024), vocalist in the cumbia genre of Colombian music
- Leonor Izquierdo (1894–1912), wife of Antonio Machado
- Leonor Lasso de la Vega, Spanish noble
- Leonor Llausás (1929–2003), Mexican actress
- Leonor López de Córdoba (1362–1420), advisor and confidant of Queen Catalina of Lancaster
- Leonor F. Loree (1858–1940), American civil engineer, lawyer and railroad executive
- Leonor Maia (1926–2010), Portuguese film actress
- Leonor Manso (born 1948), Argentine actress
- Leonor Martín (born 1989), Spanish actress
- Leonor Martínez Villada (born 1950), Argentine politician
- Léonor Mérimée (1757–1836), French painter
- Leonor Michaelis (1875–1949), German-born American biochemist and physician
- Leonor Noyola Cervantes (born 1962), Mexican politician
- Leonor Nzinga Nlaza, African noblewoman
- Leonor Ordóñez (1837–1882), Peruvian guerrilla fighter
- Leonor Orosa-Goquinco (1917–2005), Filipino national artist in creative dance
- Leonor Oyarzún (1919–2022), First Lady of Chile, wife of former President Patricio Aylwin
- Leonor Piuza (born 1978), Mozambican 800 metre runner
- Leonor Poeiras (born 1980), Portuguese television presenter
- Leonor Rivera (1867–1893), the childhood sweetheart of Philippine national hero José Rizal
- Leonor Rodríguez (born 1991), Spanish basketball player
- Léonor Serraille, French screenwriter and director
- Leonor Romero Sevilla (born 1958), Mexican politician
- Leonor Silveira (born 1970), Portuguese actress
- Léonor Jean Soulas d'Allainval (1696–1753), French playwright
- Leonor Sullivan (1902–1988), American politician
- Leonor Teles (born 1992), Portuguese filmmaker
- Leonor Telles de Menezes (1350–1386), queen consort of Portugal and regent in 1383–1385
- Leonor Urueta (born 1954), Mexican swimmer
- Leonor Varela (born 1972), Chilean actress, and model
- Leonor Villegas de Magnón (1876–1955), Mexican-American politician
- Leonor Watling (born 1975), Spanish film actress
- Leonor Zalabata (born 1954), Colombian Arhuaco politician, writer, chronicler and defender of human rights
- Leonor, Princess of Asturias (born 2005), heir presumptive to the Spanish throne

== See also ==
- Leonore (disambiguation)

Leonor means:god is my strength or god is my light
