= Lenora =

Lenora may refer to:

== People ==
- Lenora de Barr (born 1953), Brazilian artist and poet
- Lenora Champagne, American playwright and performer
- Lenora Claire, American media personality
- Lenora Crichlow (born 1985), British actress
- Lenora Fisher (born 1937), Canadian swimmer
- Lenora Fulani (born 1950), American academic and activist
- Lenora Garfinkel (1930–2020), American architect
- Lénora Guion-Firmin (born 1991), French sprinter
- Lenora Hume, Canadian producer
- Lenora Mandella (1931–2005), American baseball player
- Lenora Misa (born 1997), Samoan netball player
- Lenora Moragne (1931–2020), American nutritionist
- Lenora Nemetz, American actress
- Lenora Qereqeretabua (born 1968), Fijian broadcaster and politician
- Lenora Rolla (1904–2001), American activist, businesswoman, educator and historian
- Lenora Mattingly Weber (1895–1971), American writer

=== Surname ===
- R. B. Lenora (1906–?), Sri Lankan physician and politician

=== Fictional characters ===
- Lenora (Pokémon), a Unova Gym Leader in the Pokémon franchise
- Lenora Laferty, character in The Devil All the Time

== Places ==
=== Settlements ===
- Lenora, Kansas, city
- Lenora, Minnesota, unincorporated community
- Lenora Township, Griggs County, North Dakota, township
- Lenora, Oklahoma, unincorporated community
- Lenora (Prachatice District), a municipality and village in the Czech Republic

=== Structures ===
- John J. and Lenora Bartlett House, Nebraska
- Lenora Methodist Episcopal Church, Minnesota
- Lenora wooden bridge, Czech Republic

== See also ==
- Lenorah, Texas
- Leonora (disambiguation)
- Lorena (disambiguation)
