= Beautiful Friendship =

Beautiful Friendship may refer to:

- Beautiful Friendship (Elise Wood & John Hicks album), 2000
- Beautiful Friendship (The Three Sounds album), 1965
- "Beautiful Friendship" (song), a 1970 single by the Continental Uptight Band
- Beautiful Friendship, a 1970 album by Continental Uptight Band
- Beautiful Friendship, a 2006 album by The Drummonds
- Beautiful Friendship, a 1989 album by Mike Nock
- "Beautiful Friendship", a song by Ernest Tubb and Loretta Lynn, from the album Singin' Again

== See also ==
- A Beautiful Friendship (disambiguation)
