= Kienberg =

Kienberg (German pronunciation: [ˈkiːnbɛʁk]) is the name of several places:

- Kienberg (Gärten der Welt) (Berlin U-Bahn), a railway station
- Kienberg, Bavaria, Germany
- Kienberg, Switzerland
- Loučovice, a village in South Bohemia, known as Kienberg in German
