= Eleonora of Sweden (disambiguation) =

Eleonora of Sweden (Swedish: Eleonora av Sverige) may refer to:

== People ==
- Maria Eleonora, Princess of Brandenburg (1599–1655), queen consort of Gustav II Adolph of Sweden
- Eleonora Catherine, Countess Palatine of Zweibrücken (1626–1692), sister of Charles X Gustav of Sweden
- Hedwig Eleonora, Princess of Holstein-Gottorp (1636–1715), queen consort of Charles X Gustav of Sweden
- Ulrika Eleonora, Princess of Denmark (1656–1693), queen consort of Charles XI of Sweden
- Ulrika Eleonora, Princess of Sweden (1688–1741), queen regent and queen (in her own right) of Sweden

== See also ==
- Leonora (disambiguation)
