= Lenore (given name) =

Lenore is a feminine, rarely masculine, given name which may refer to:

- Lenore Aubert (1913–1993), American actress
- Lenore E. Bixby (1914–1994), American statistician
- Lenore Blum (born 1942), American mathematician and professor of computer science
- Lenore Chinn (born 1949), American artist
- Lenore Coffee (1896–1984), American writer
- Lenore Kandel (1932–2009), American poet
- Lenore Kight (1911–2000), American swimmer
- Lenore RS Lim (born 1945), Filipino artist
- Lenore Manderson (born 1951), Australian medical anthropologist
- Lenore Marshall (1899–1971), American poet, novelist and activist
- Lenore Miller (1932–2025), American labor union leader
- Lenore Muraoka (born 1955), American golfer
- Lenore Carrero Nesbitt (1932–2001), American judge
- Lenore Raphael (born 1942), American jazz pianist and educator
- Lenore Romney (1908–1998), wife of American businessman and politician George W. Romney and mother of politician Mitt Romney
- Lenore Skenazy (born 1959), American newspaper columnist
- Lenore Smith (born 1958), Australian actress
- Lenore Tawney (1907–2007), American artist
- Lenore Ulric (1892–1970), American actor
- Lenore Zann (born 1959), Canadian politician and actress
