= A Beautiful Friendship =

A Beautiful Friendship may refer to:

== Fiction ==
- "A Beautiful Friendship", a short story by David Weber in the 1998 Honorverse anthology More Than Honor
- A Beautiful Friendship (novel), a 2011 Honorverse novel by David Weber

== Music ==
- "A Beautiful Friendship" (song), a song by composer Donald Kahn and lyricist Stanley Styne, recorded by Ella Fitzgerald, 1956
- A Beautiful Friendship (album), by the Don Thompson Quartet, 1984
- A Beautiful Friendship, an album by Brian Lemon, 1995
- A Beautiful Friendship, an album by Lenore Raphael
- A Beautiful Friendship, an album by Rebecca Parris, 1994

== See also ==
- Beautiful Friendship (disambiguation)
