= Lenora wooden bridge =

Rechle u Lenory Lenora wooden bridge
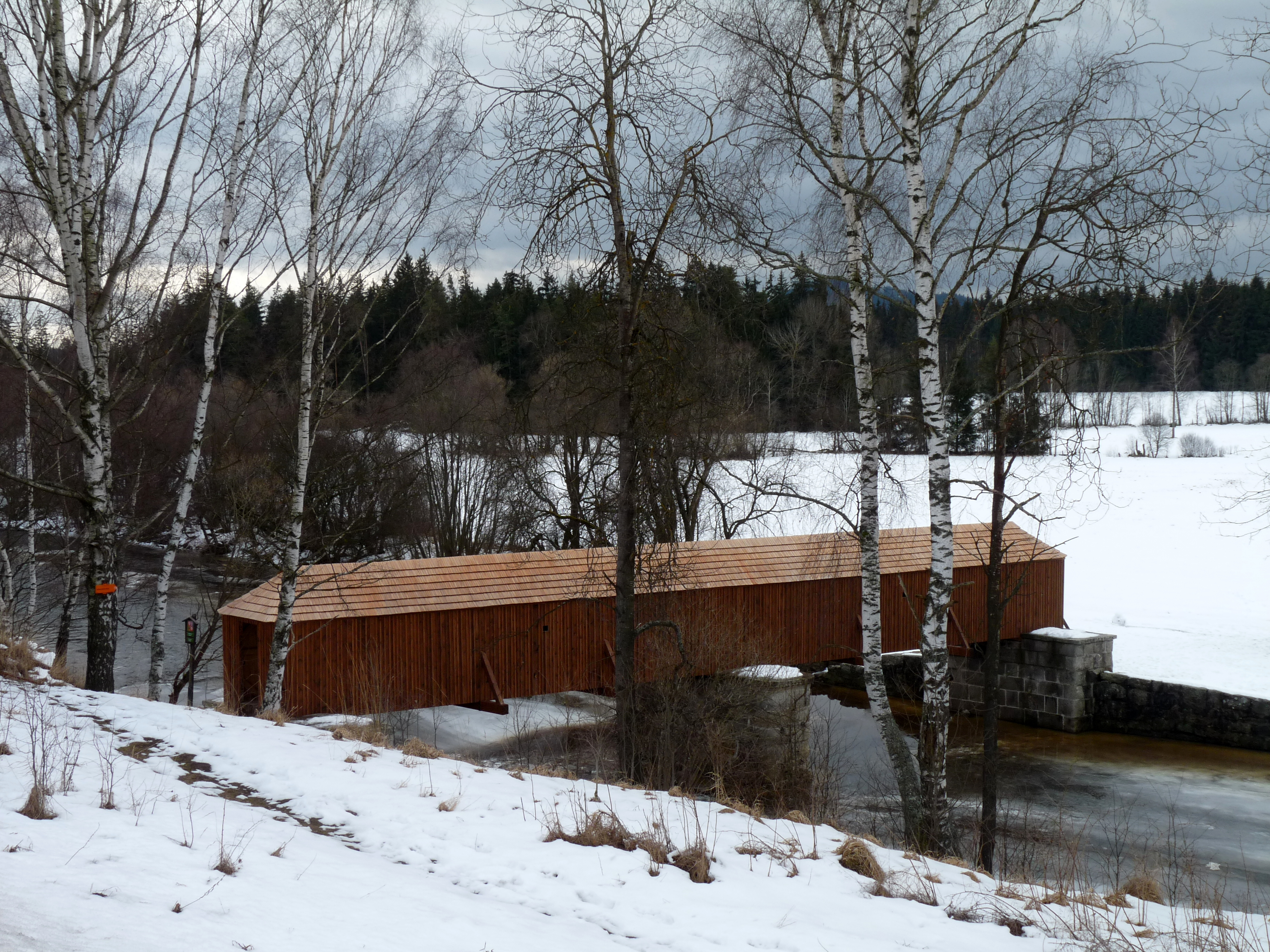
- View from the road
- Coordinates: 48.9222°N 13.8065°E
- Crosses: Teplá Vltava
- Locale: Lenora
- Official name: Rechle u Lenory

Characteristics
- Design: 3 pylons
- Total length: 27.77 metres (91.1 ft)
- Width: 1.8 metres (5.9 ft)
- Height: 3 metres (9.8 ft)

History
- Opened: 1870

Location
- Interactive map of Rechle u Lenory; Lenora wooden bridge

Lenora wooden bridge (official name: Rechle u Lenory) is a wooden footbridge with hip roof over the Teplá Vltava river in Lenora in the South Bohemian Region of the Czech Republic. The main purpose of the bridge was holding the floating wood. It served its function until the middle of the last century. The structure is located next to road I / 39 in the Volary direction. The structure was declared a cultural monument in 1958.

== History ==
The covered wooden footbridge was built in 1870 and was used for the retention, counting, rectification and discharge of timber floating down the Vltava River from the Bohemian Forest, namely from the Boubín area, to the paper mills in Loučovice and Větřní.

The Czech name Rechle comes from the German word Rechen, which means 'rake'. And that describes what the function of the bridge used to be. There were openings in the floor of the bridge where beams were inserted into the river, and they were used similar to rakes for retaining the wood during low water. The logs were released when water level has risen again. The bridge carried on this function until the Lipno dam was built in 1959 an timber was not flown down the river anymore.

An overall repair of the bridge was carried out in 1985 on the initiative of the Lenora municipality. Although it survived the 2002 floods unscathed, it had to be renovated in 2014. More than three million crowns were raised from the European Union for the repair.

== Description ==
The wooden structure is 25 meters long and 1.8 meters wide. The bridge deck lies on three stone pillars at a height of about 3 meters above the water. The building is covered with a hipped roof and is accessed from the south side by wooden stairs.

== Recognition ==
There are nineteen covered wooden bridges in the Czech Republic, of which only two were used when floating wood – one is in Lenora and the other is in Český Krumlov. The Lenora bridge is an authentically preserved example of a technical structure, which proves the constructional qualities of the 19th century builders, it was declared a cultural monument in 1958.

The footbridge uniqueness was recognized by the Czech National Bank when it issued a commemorative 5000 CZK gold coin in 2013 depicting the "Rechle".
