= The Village Subway =

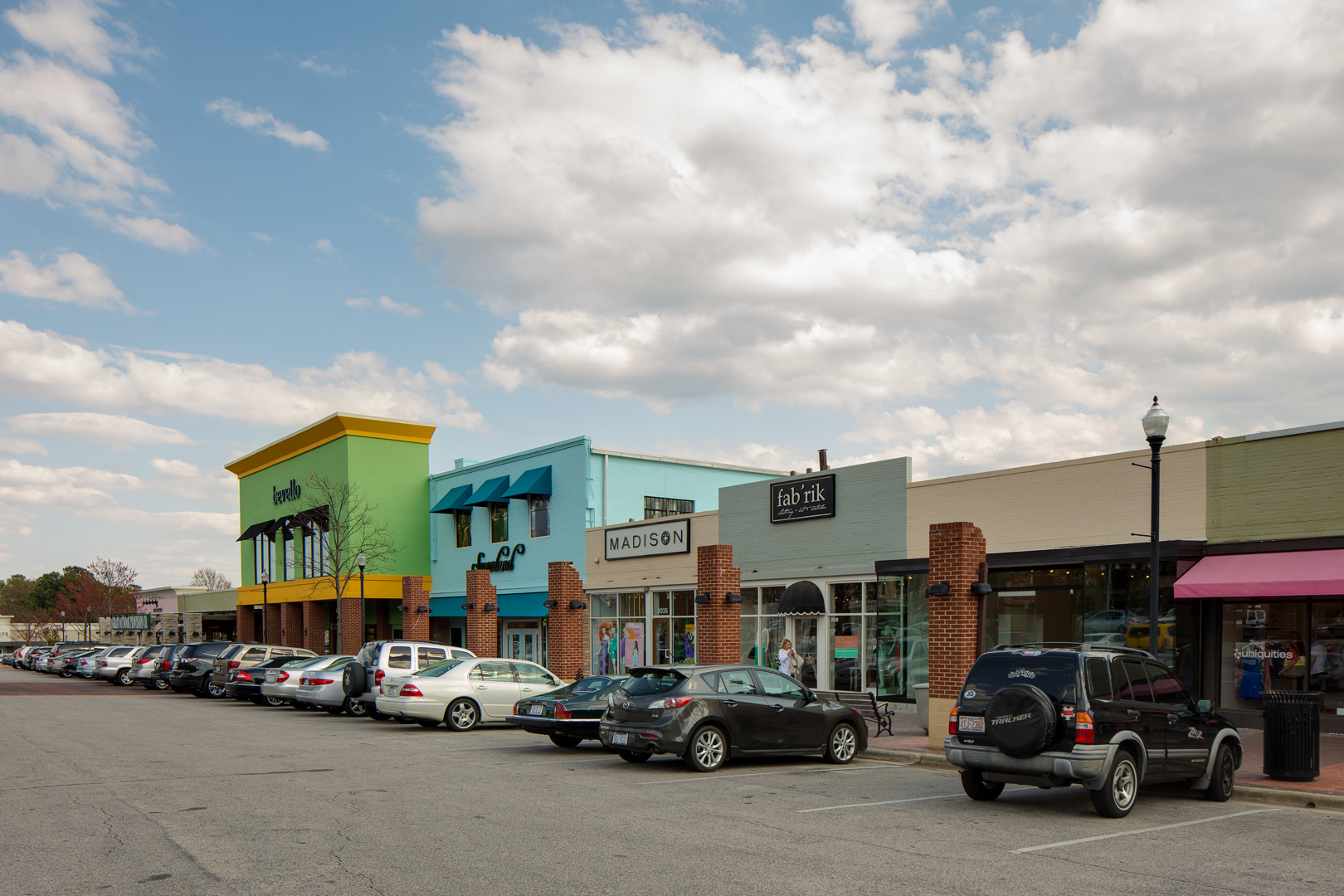
- Location: Raleigh, North Carolina, USA
- Opened: 1972
- Closed: 1984
- Developer: J.W. York and R.A. Bryan
- Manager: York Properties
- Owner: Regency Centers www.regencycenters.com
- Website: www.shopcameronvillage.com

The Village Subway, also commonly known as Raleigh Underground, was an underground entertainment district located underneath the Cameron Village shopping center in Raleigh, North Carolina. During the 1970s and 1980s, this underground network contained nightclubs, restaurants, commercial shops, and an arcade. Live music and entertainment consistently made appearances there. The underground music venues included The Frog and Nightgown, The Pier, The Bear's Den, Elliot's Nest and Cafe Deja Vu. The Village Subway, opened in 1972, was shut down in 1984 due to concerns about the fire code, drug use and customer safety.

== History ==
In 1947, the 158 acres of land that make up Cameron Village were purchased by J. W. York and R. A. Bryan. Their company, York Properties, owned the land until 1964, when the property was sold to Brookmont Corporation in the Dutch Antilles. York Properties still managed the area after they sold it.

The 20,000 square feet space was originally constructed as a bomb shelter during the Cold War. It was planned to be used not only as a place for citizens to go during an attack, but also for the federal government to recuperate.

The Village Subway was modeled after Underground Atlanta, a similar entertainment and shopping complex, which is still in use today. Both locations have a similar mix of restaurants, clubs, and boutiques.

The name "Village Subway" came from its New York City-like subway entrance with a long stairwell that led to paintings of trains. There was also rectangular paintings of shops that decorated the walls.

Author David Sedaris, who spent his high school years in Raleigh, said he remembers going to the Frog and Nightgown and thinking "This is what New York is like!"

Although The Village Subway had early popularity, there wasn't enough traffic during the day to keep up with the nightlife. Security became a problem, since drugs were beginning to be distributed in the parking lot and service areas surrounding the Village. These issues as well as concerns about the fire code led to the closing of The Village Subway in 1984.

== Music Scene ==
As interest was recently rekindled in The Village Subway, many former artists that performed at one of the three nightclubs beneath Cameron Village shared their experiences. Dave Adams, a musician who used to play in many of the underground venues, describes how often artists became famous after their performances at The Village Subway more than thirty years ago. Adams played keyboard and sang for many bands during the 1970s. Among them are local bands Glass Moon and The Fabulous Knobs, who both had regional popularity at the time.

The atmosphere of The Village Subway, as described by Adams, was "diverse and expansive," with "all types of music there, from jazz to international groups." Many artists, both well-known and obscure, performed in the underground venue. Some artists are famous for their performances at Raleigh's The Frog and Nightgown, including Paul Jeffrey, known for working with Thelonious Monk. He spent 10 days in North Carolina performing at the Village Subway in 1970. At a later concert of his, excerpts from his set in the Raleigh club were played.

The Frog and Nightgown served as Raleigh's only jazz club at the time. Jazz music was popular in Raleigh, and audiences had to keep an eye on who was performing frequently because performers were not often announced in advance. Finding her niche in jazz music, artist Lenore Raphael connected with Peter Ingram, owner of the Frog and Nightclub from 1968 until 1975. Both jazz players, they performed together. Some artists though, like Dave Adams, performed frequently at events such as "Rock Night," which took place every week.

Many other up and coming bands played in the basement venues, from R.E.M. to Jimmy Buffett. The first known concert footage of R.E.M. was recorded in 1982 at The Pier. In addition, Sonic Youth recorded the live track "I Wanna Be Your Dog", a Stooges cover, at The Pier for its album Confusion is Sex.

The Connells also found their start here, performing at Cafe Deja Vu and other underground clubs in The Village Subway during their early years. They lived in close proximity to Cameron Village, and were able to walk to some of the shows, carrying their equipment with them.

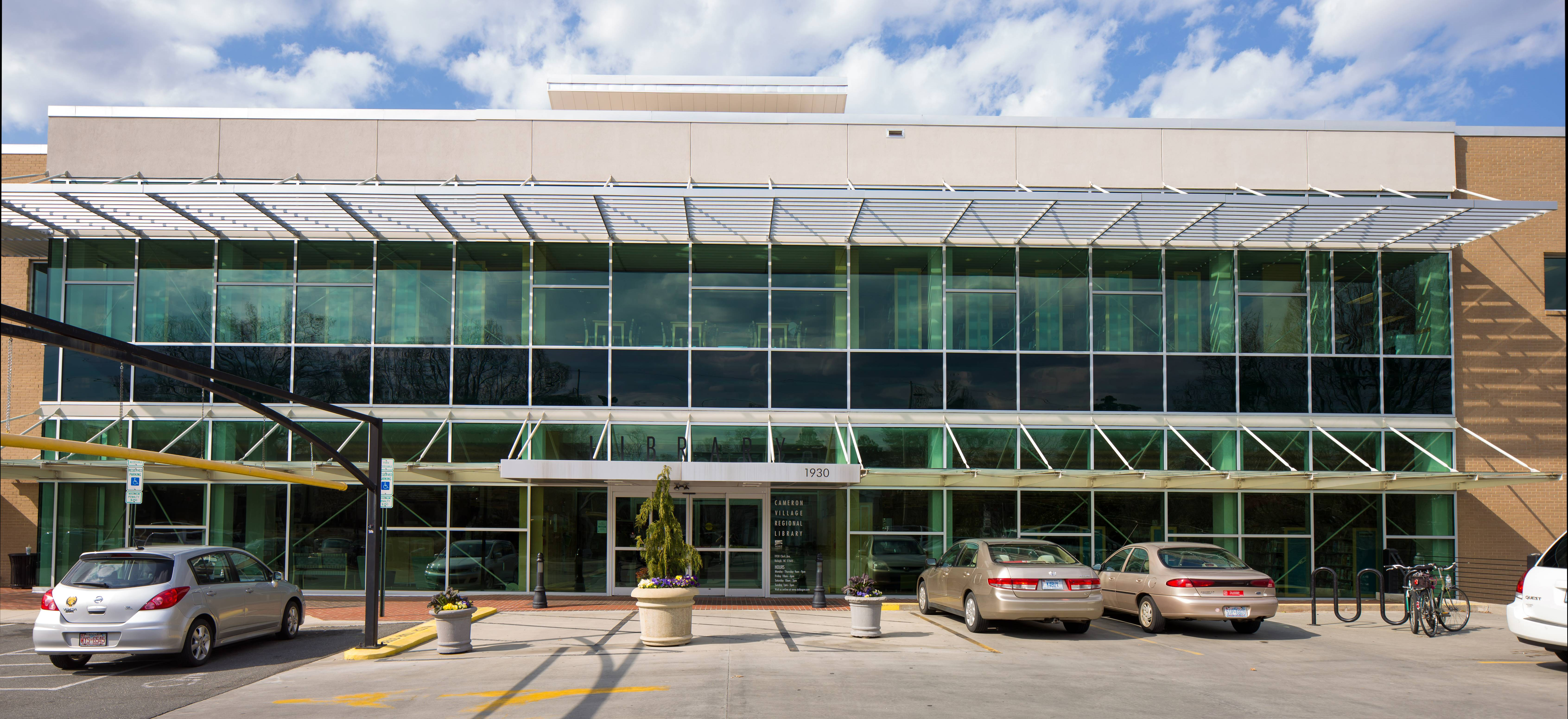
Cameron Village Regional Library today. The Village Subway was located directly underneath.

== Petition and plans ==
The interest in The Village Subway was rekindled after a Candid Slice article, written by Heather Leah, reminded people of the vacated area. Upon being shown blueprints of the area by a friend, Leah expressed her interest via her online article.

More than five hundred thousand people read the article since July 2013, and the nostalgia associated with the underground club scene caused a petition for a revival of The Village Subway. The groups were asking to bring back the popular nightlife location instead of allowing the space to go unused.

The current president of York Properties is G. Smedes York.

Fresh Market signed a lease March 28, 2014 to use the old The Village Subway space for food preparation. John Pharr, the senior vice president of Regency's Southwest Region said, "This was an unusual situation because The Fresh Market has been at the shopping center a long time, but it's one of their smallest stores. Right now, they are fenced in by the library next door, so it was go vertical or go below. They decided to go below." The Fresh Market Underground will not be open to the public.

Fresh Market has one of the two remaining entrances to the underground, the other being behind the former Party Shop (now Steven Shell Living).

== Farewell events ==
On April 25, 2014, music returned briefly above The Village Subway in an event called "Cameron Village Live." The Love Language were performers.

This vacant space then reopened one time for a special event on May 16, 2015, to benefit local charities; as reported by the Raleigh News & Observer. The event included a fashion show, live music and a chance to view historic photographs. After this event, an undefined renovation is planned. The underground space is a wide open shell at present, because the structures that enclosed the various clubs and stores have been removed in the past. The article remarks that the prices for admission are not equivalent to those in the 1980s. To gain admission to the event beneath Cameron Village, VIP passes would be $125 and general admission would be $85.

The admission tickets sold out within four hours, Indy Week reported; $25,000 was to benefit the Inter-Faith Food Shuttle.

There was some criticism in an article by Indy Week after the event, that none of the bands who created the original scene were invited to play again. A wedding band, Crush, was the only live music. As well, Rod Abernethy, a past member of Arrogance, who played at least 75 times in the Underground, said he knew "few people" from past bands who would be attending because they "couldn't afford it". When asked if he would be attending, he remarked: "No, I didn't buy a ticket. They cost too much for me."

== See also ==
- Music of North Carolina
- Red Hat Amphitheater
- Urban exploration
- Hopscotch Music Festival
- Duke Energy Center for the Performing Arts
