= Leonore =

Leonore may refer to:

- Leonore (given name), a list of people with the name
- The title character, and original title, of Beethoven's opera Fidelio
- Léonore, ou L'amour conjugal, a 1798 opera by Pierre Gaveaux
- Leonore, Illinois, a village in the United States
- Base Léonore, a database of recipients of France's National Order of the Legion of Honor
- Princess Leonore, Duchess of Gotland

== See also ==
- Leonor, a given name
- Léonor, a 1975 horror film
- JB Leonor, Filipino drummer and songwriter born Domingo Leonor III
- Leonora (disambiguation)
- Lenore (disambiguation)
