= Internationale Gartenausstellung 2017 =

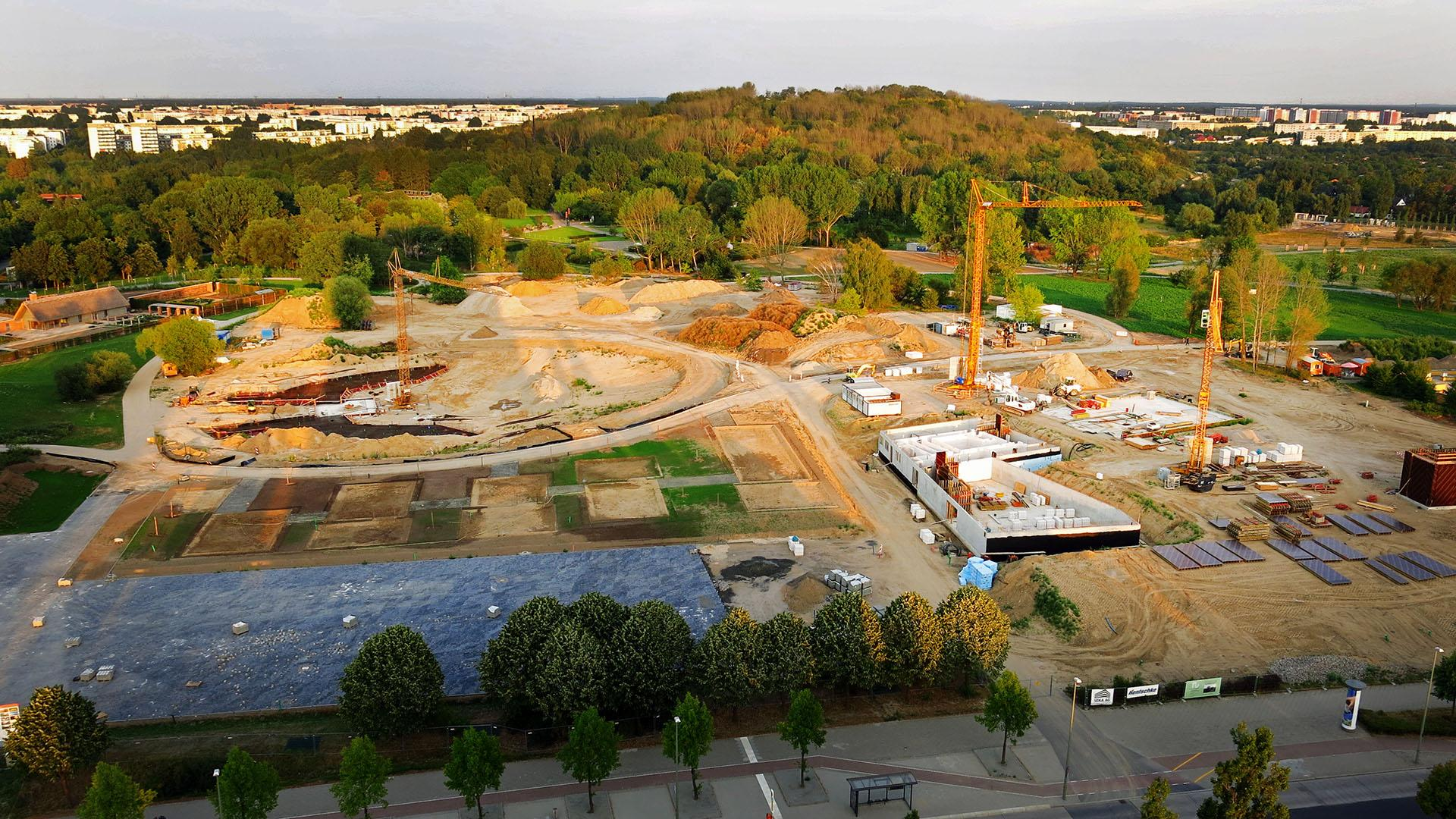
- Works at the Erholungspark Marzahn in August 2015
- Coordinates: 52°32′22″N 13°34′36″E
- Area: 100 hectares (250 acres)
- Website: IGA2017

The Internationale Gartenausstellung 2017 (IGA 2017) was an international horticultural exhibition that took place in Berlin, Germany, in 2017.

== History ==
=== History of the site ===
The venue is the area surrounding the Kienberg that was originally known as Berliner Gartenschau. This was the horticultural exposition held in 1987, in that times in East Germany, in commemoration of the 750th birthday of the city of Berlin. In 1991, after German reunification the park was renamed to Erholungspark Marzahn and expanded afterwards. During the years 2000 - 2006 several gardens modeled after Asian examples were added. Since 2007 gardens modelled after European examples followed. In 2013 works began to prepare for the IGA 2017.

== Transport ==
The nearest metro station is Kienberg (Gärten der Welt), on the U5 line which was named "Neue Grottkauer Straße" until 2016, when it was renamed for the upcoming event. The station is also the eastern terminus of the IGA Cable Car (German: IGA-Seilbahn), a 1.5 km-long aerial tramway line serving and crossing the Erholungspark Marzahn, built for the expo.
