= Village District =

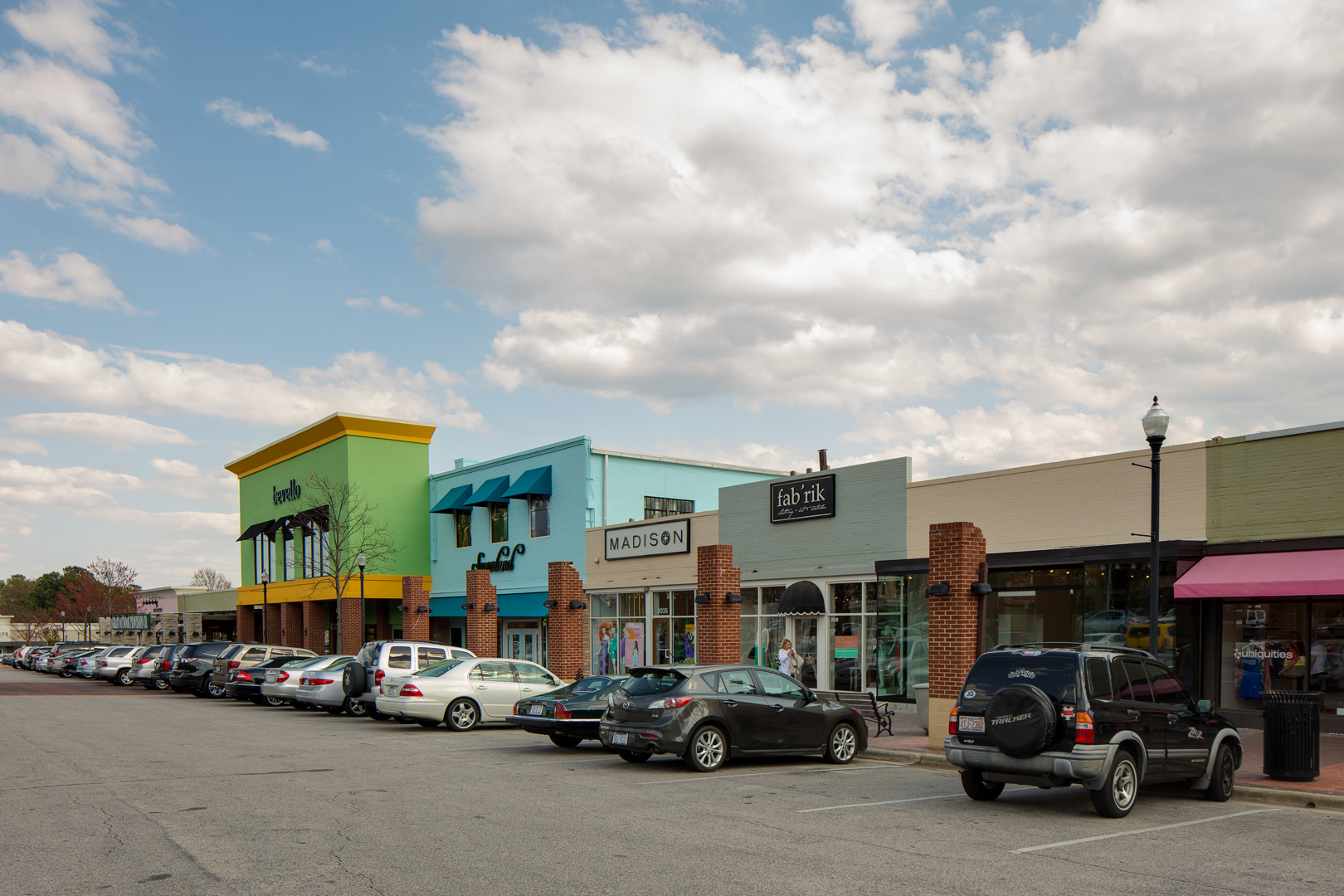
- Village District storefronts
- Location: Raleigh, North Carolina, United States
- Coordinates: 35.79380°N 78.65760°W
- Opened: 1949
- Developer: J.W. York and R.A. Bryan
- Manager: York Properties
- Owner: Regency Centers
- Website: shopvillagedistrict.com

Village District (formerly Cameron Village), is the first planned community to be developed in Raleigh, North Carolina. Development was started in 1947 when J.W. York and R.A Bryan bought 158 acres (64 ha) of undeveloped land two miles west of downtown Raleigh, near the North Carolina State University campus. The "village" would consist of a shopping center, apartments, and single family homes. As of the mid-2010s, the shopping center had over 100 stores.

The area was renamed Village District in 2021 to distance itself from the slave owning Cameron family, who owned Stagville Plantation, that it was originally named after.

== History ==
The shopping center opened in 1949 as Cameron Village, and quickly became the premier shopping area in Raleigh. It is also considered the first shopping center to be built between Washington, D.C., and Atlanta. The shopping center is an open-air shopping mall, but unlike a strip mall, the stores are divided into blocks with some on two levels. Several parking decks were built in the 1960s, although most of these were removed in later renovations.

Cameron Village grew quickly, and by 1950 the community had 65 stores, a movie theater, more than 600 homes and apartments, and over 100 business/professional offices. Downtown Raleigh, which had been the primary shopping location in the Raleigh area, started to see a decline in business as consumers gravitated toward the convenient parking of Cameron Village.

The Occidental Life Insurance Company Building was added to Cameron Village in 1956. It was listed on the National Register of Historic Places in 2003.

On January 28, 2021, Cameron Village shopping center was renamed to Village District, after 71 years to avoid celebrating the plantation owner for whom the center had been named and who held people enslaved to operate the plantation.

== Neighborhood Association ==
Residents of the single family homes, condominiums, and apartments in Village District are represented by the Cameron Village Neighborhood Association.

== Entertainment ==
In the 1970s, “The Village Subway,” an underground area, formerly used as a bomb shelter in the Cold War, was converted into an entertainment and music venue that included shops and restaurants. It was located beneath the current The Fresh Market and the Oberlin Regional Library (formerly Cameron Village Regional Library). Nightclubs such as The Frog and Nightgown, The Pier, and Cafe Déjà Vu opened and attracted many regional and national upcoming performers as diverse as Muddy Waters, Barry Manilow, and R.E.M. “The Village Subway” existed for about 12 years; however, most establishments closed during the 1980s.

== Currently ==
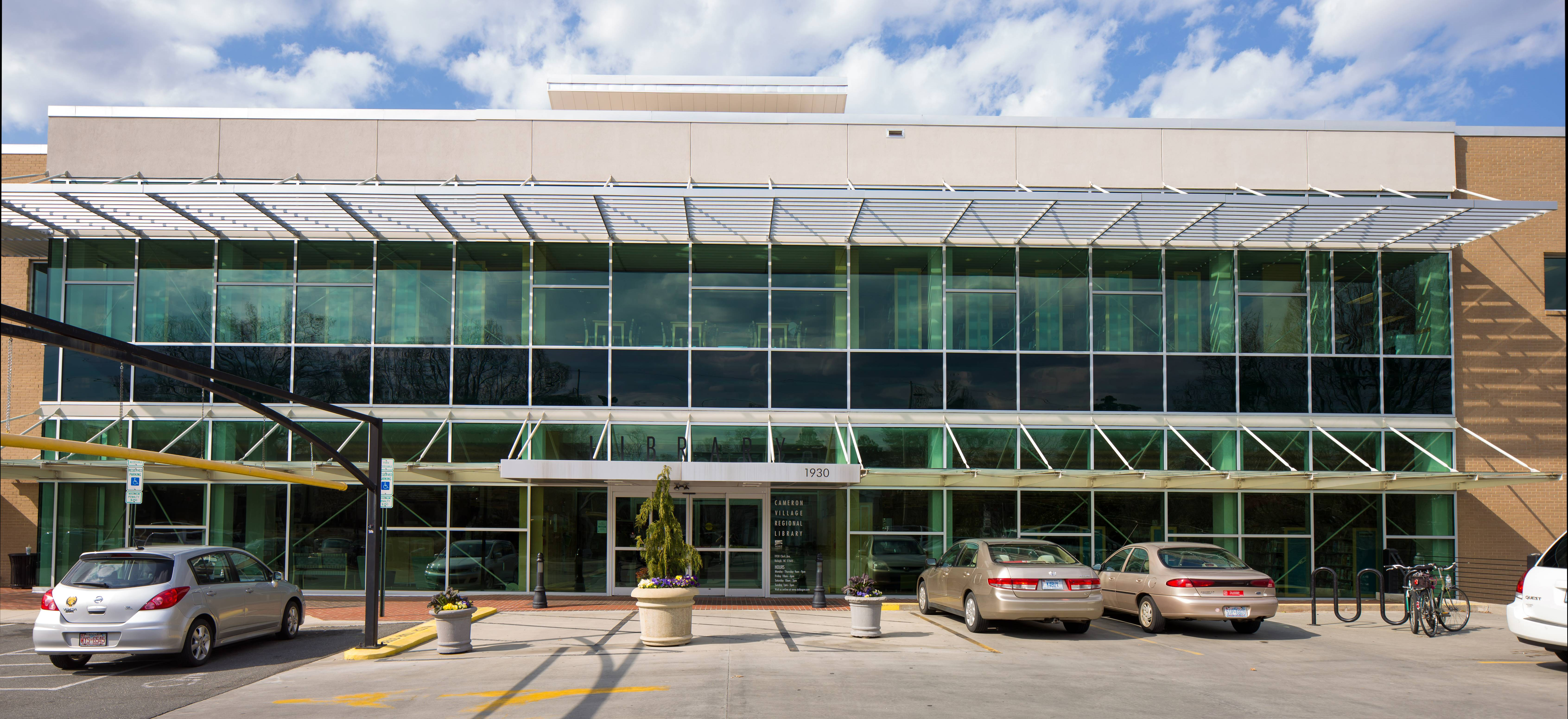
Renovated Oberlin Regional Library

The Fresh Market, Harris Teeter, Walgreens, and a Wake County Public Library branch serve as anchors. The shopping center has been expanded and renovated several times, including a restyling in the mid-1980s and another in the early 2000s. As of the mid-2010s, Village District had over 100 stores including over a dozen restaurants like The Flying Biscuit Cafe and the world's first two-story Chick-fil-A.

== See also ==
- Cameron Village Historic District
