= IGA Cable Car =

Rail line in Marzahn-Hellersdorf, Berlin, Germany

IGA-Seilbahn (Seilbahn Berlin)
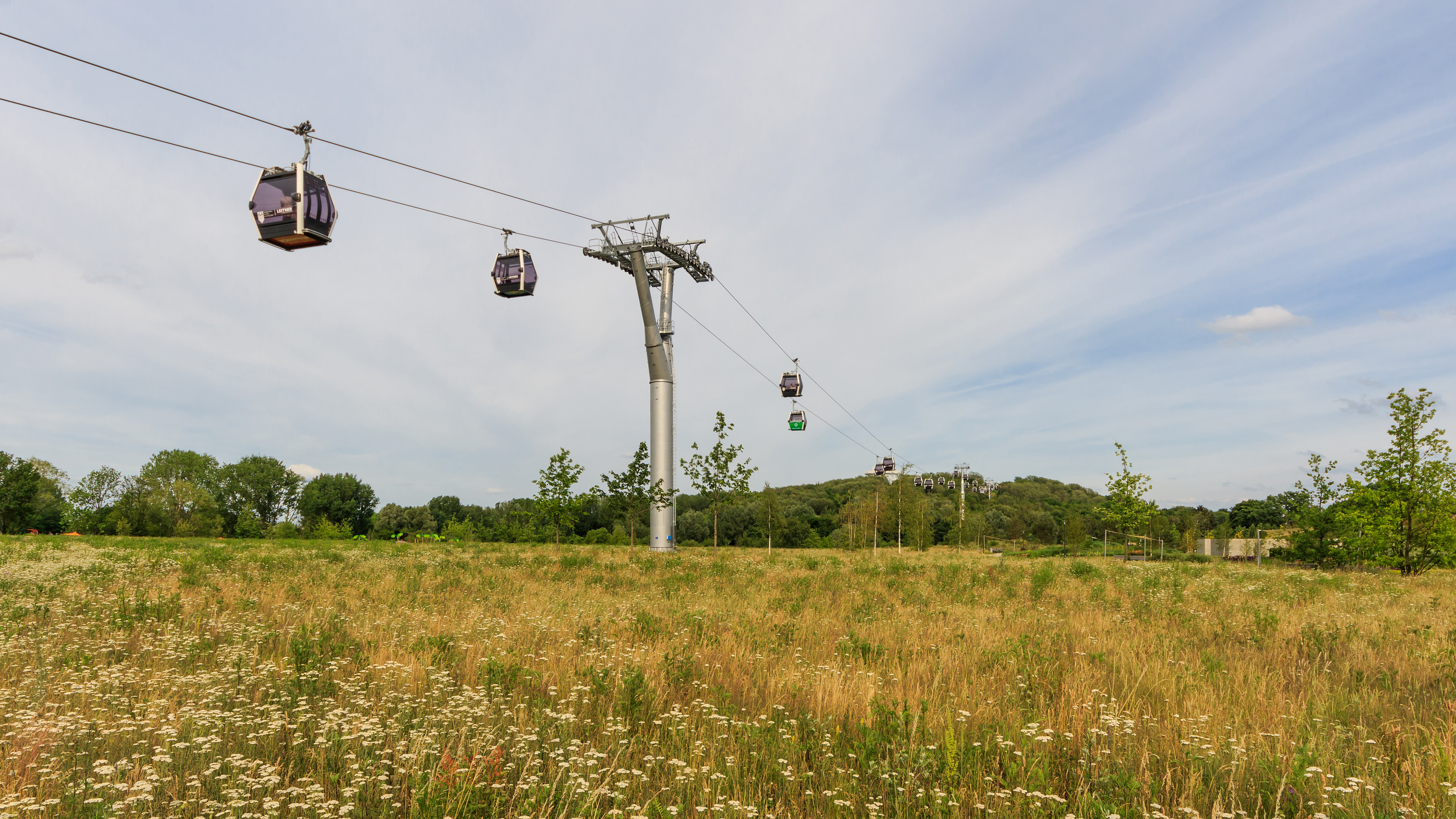

Overview
- Status: Operating
- Owner: IGA Berlin 2017
- Locale: Marzahn and Hellersdorf, Marzahn-Hellersdorf (Berlin, Germany)
- Coordinates: 52°32′2.34″N 13°34′49.61″E
- Termini: Kienbergpark (east); Gärten der Welt (west)
- Stations: 3
- Website: Official website

Service
- Type: Gondola lift
- Rolling stock: 62 gondolas

History
- Opened: 13 April 2017; 9 years ago

Technical
- Line length: 1,580 m (5,180 ft)
- Character: Elevated
- Highest elevation: 102 m (335 ft)
Route map
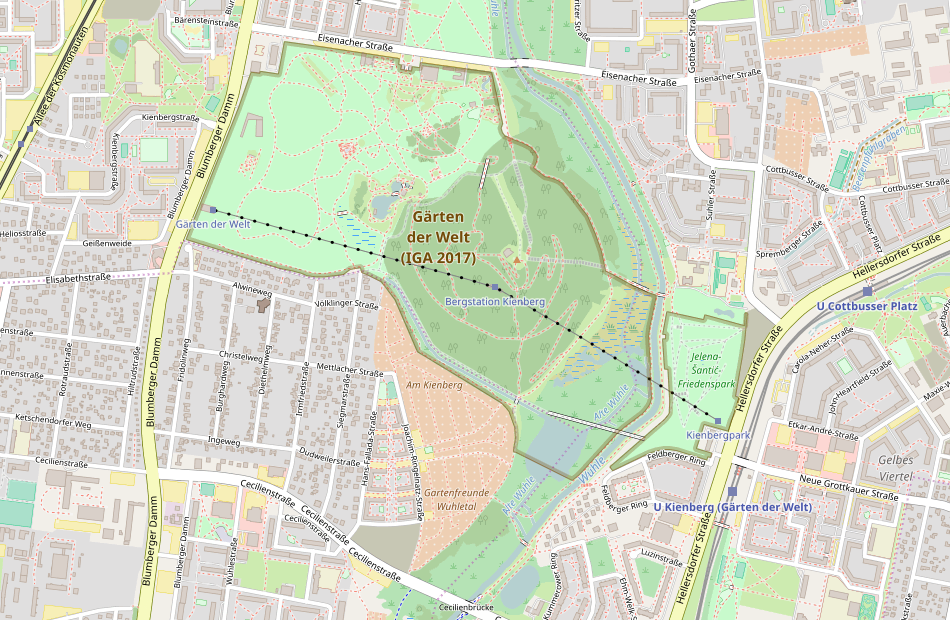

The IGA Cable Car (German: IGA-Seilbahn, IGA 2017-Seilbahn, Seilbahn Berlin), also known as Berlin Cableway, IGA Ropeway or IGA Cableway, is a 1.58 km (0.98 mi)-long gondola lift line serving and crossing the Erholungspark Marzahn in Berlin, capital of Germany. Built for the Internationale Gartenausstellung 2017 (IGA 2017), an international horticultural exhibition, it is the first cableway opened in the German capital.

== History ==
On 27 February 2014, the contract between the Italian society Leitner AG, from South Tyrol, and the IGA Berlin 2017 GmbH, was signed for a new cableway. Leitner AG bears the costs for construction and operation of around 14 million EUR. The construction of the cableway started on 16 March 2016 and went on until the late summer of that year. In September 2016, the first testing trip started with the mayor Michael Müller. The official opening was on April 13, 2017, and the ride was included in the admission ticket to the expo.

== Route ==
The line runs 1.58 km (0.98 mi), across the Erholungspark Marzahn, from the Kienbergpark to the Kienberg hill, and then down again to Blumberger Damm, at Gärten der Welt station. A journey takes five minutes, can transport 3,000 passengers per hour in both directions and there will be around 62 gondolas for ten people each.

The eastern terminus station, Kienbergpark, is linked with the U-Bahn station of Kienberg (Gärten der Welt), on the U5 line. Named "Neue Grottkauer Straße" until 2016, it was renamed in that way for the upcoming expo.

Station	Km	Amsl	Coords	Links
Kienbergpark	0.00	35	52.530483°N 13.590005°E	Kienberg (metro station)
Kienberg (Bergstation)	0.75	102	52.533983°N 13.580446°E	–
Gärten der Welt	1.58	40	52.535951°N 13.568617°E	–

== Gallery ==
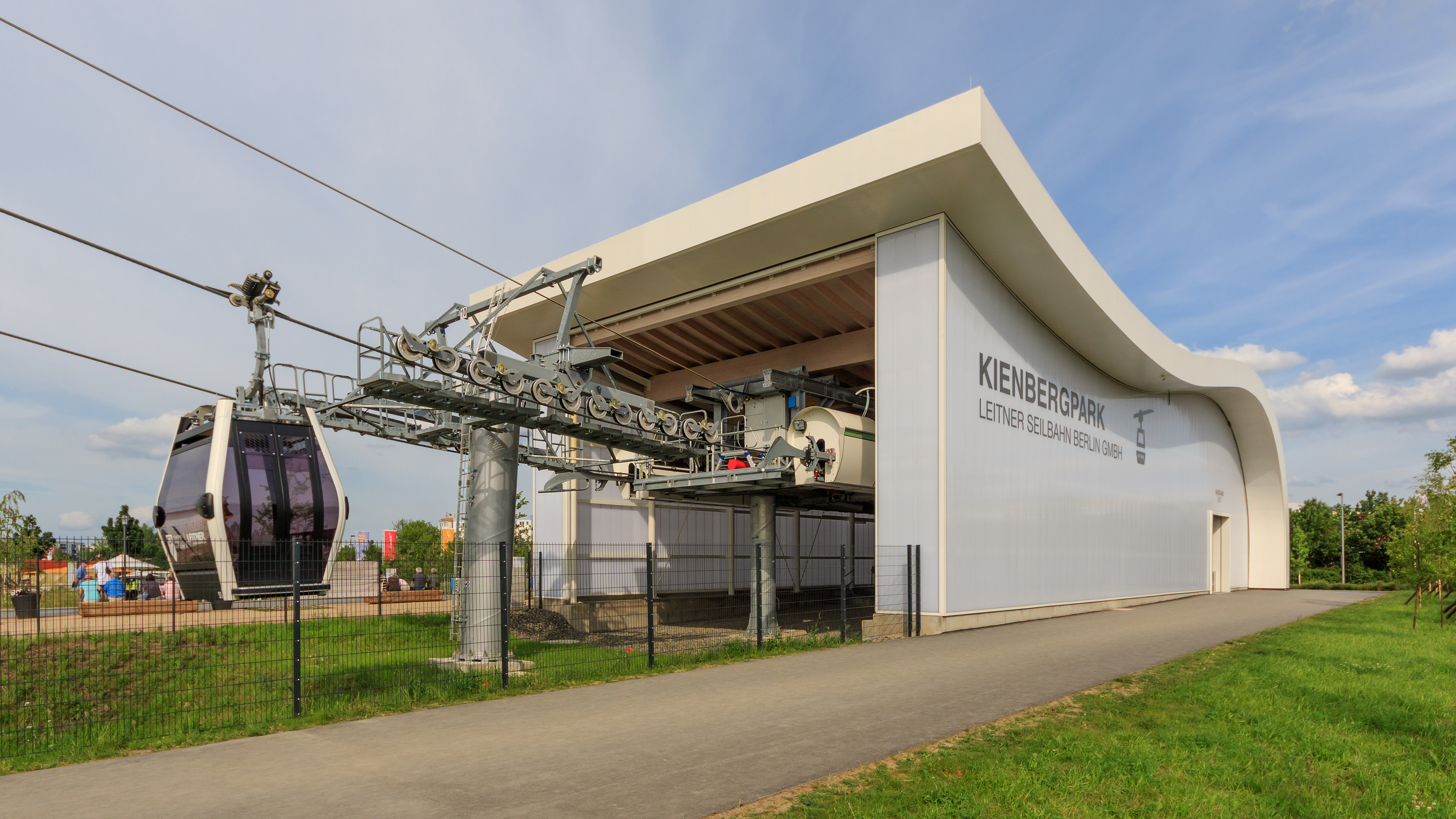
Kienbergpark station

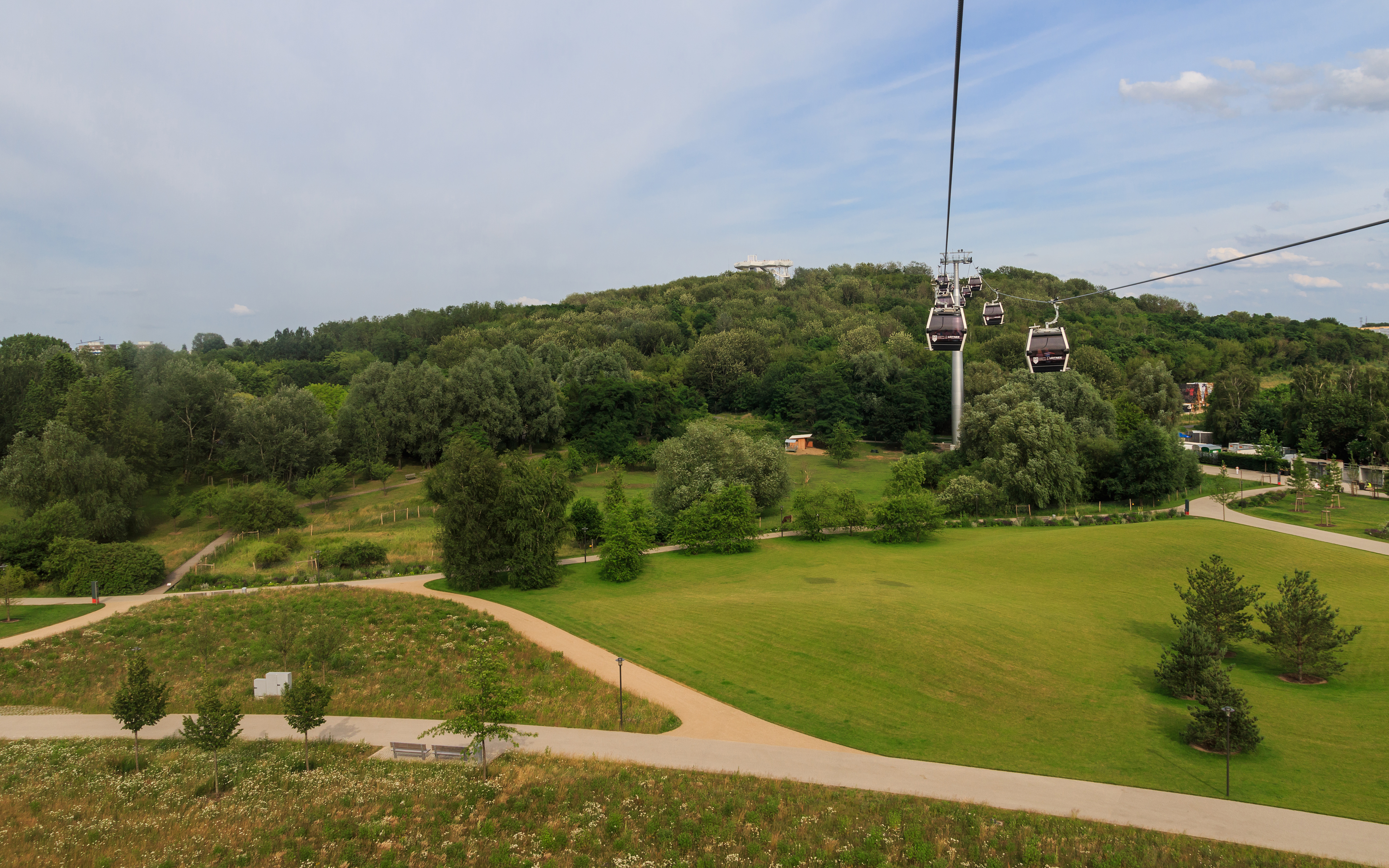
The cableway with Kienberg Hill in background

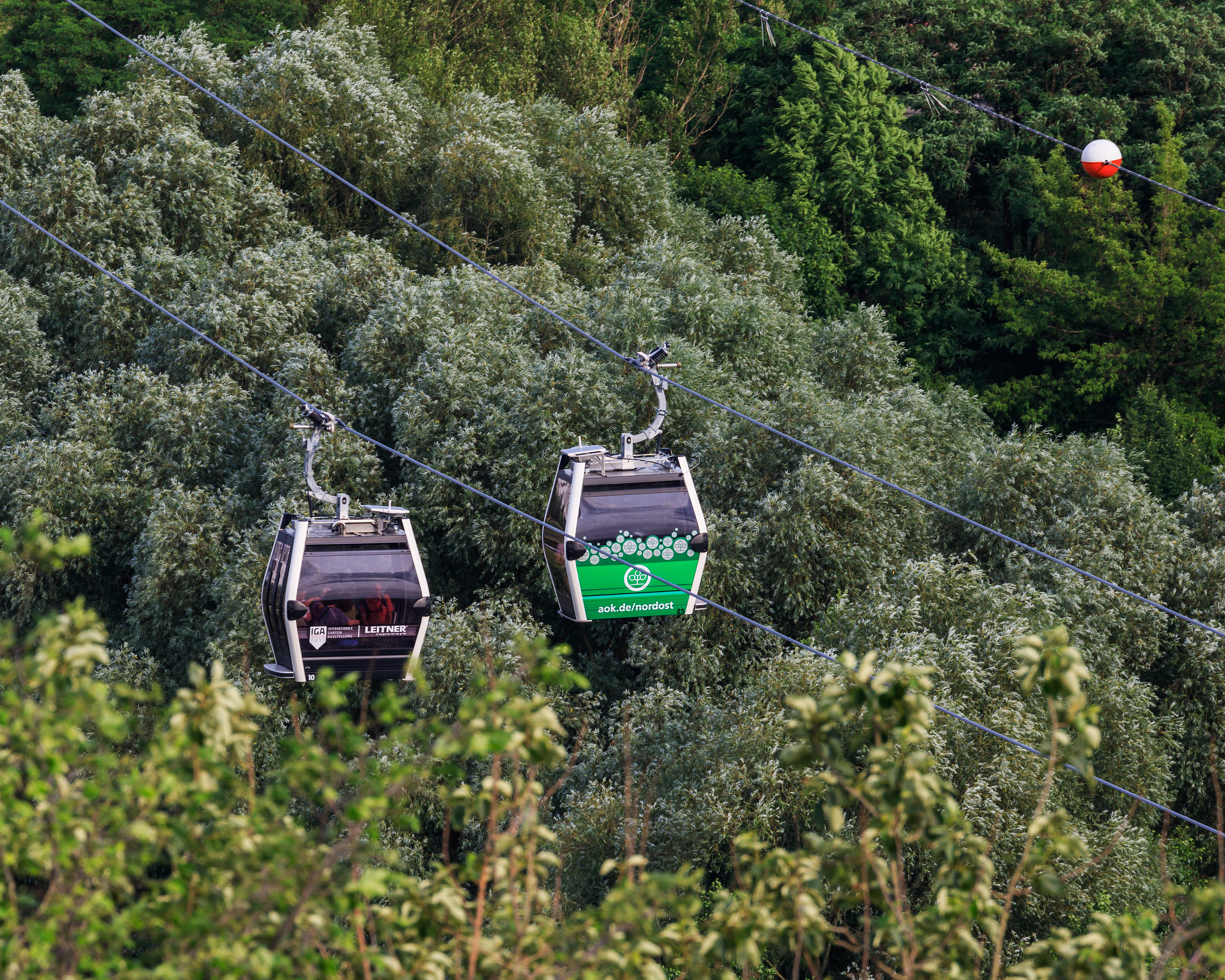
Gondolas

== See also ==
- Cologne Cable Car
- List of gondola lifts
- Emirates Air Line (cable car)
