= Gärten der Welt =

Park in Berlin, Germany

Coordinates: 52°32′22″N 13°34′36″E

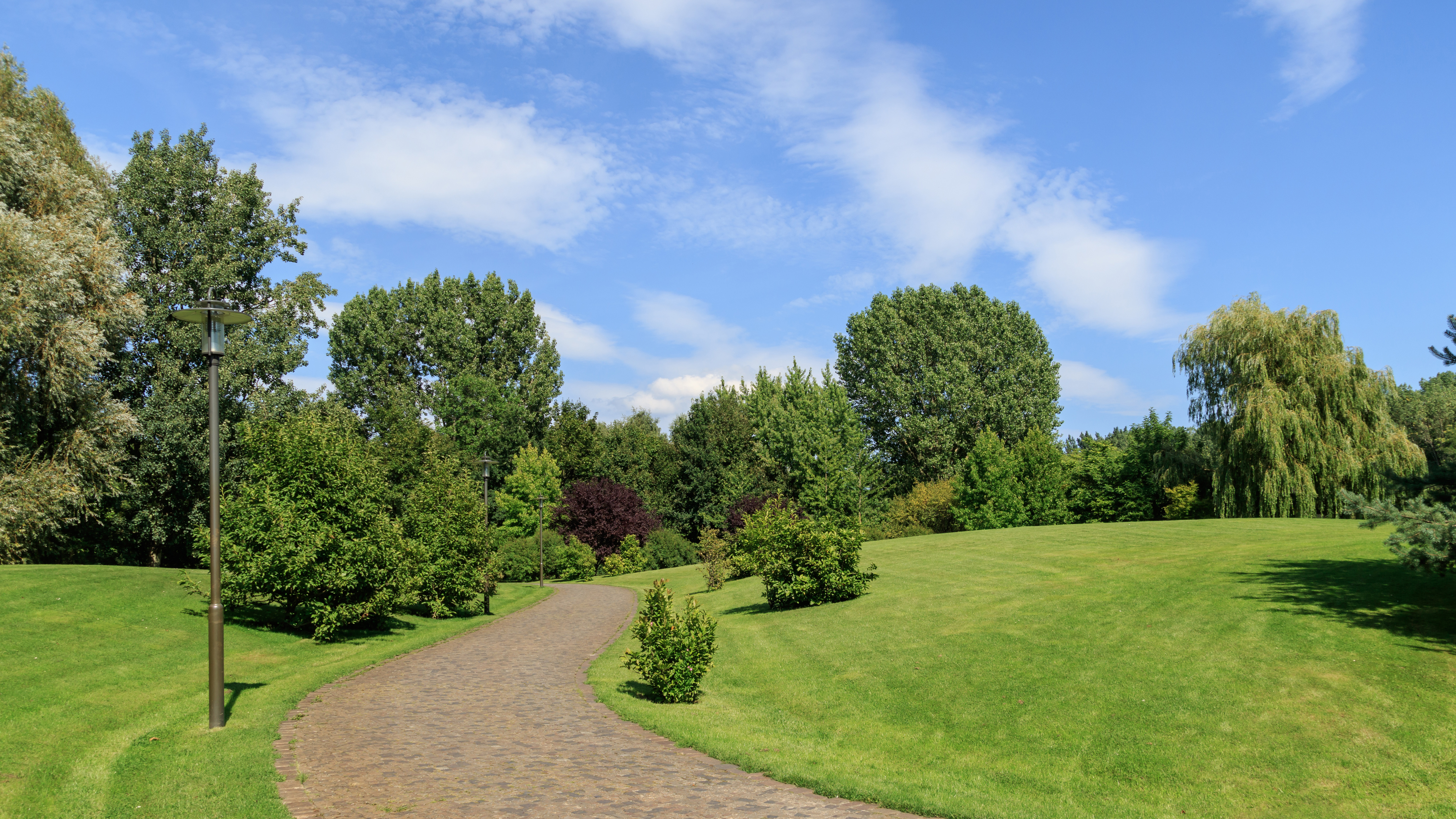
Gärten der Welt

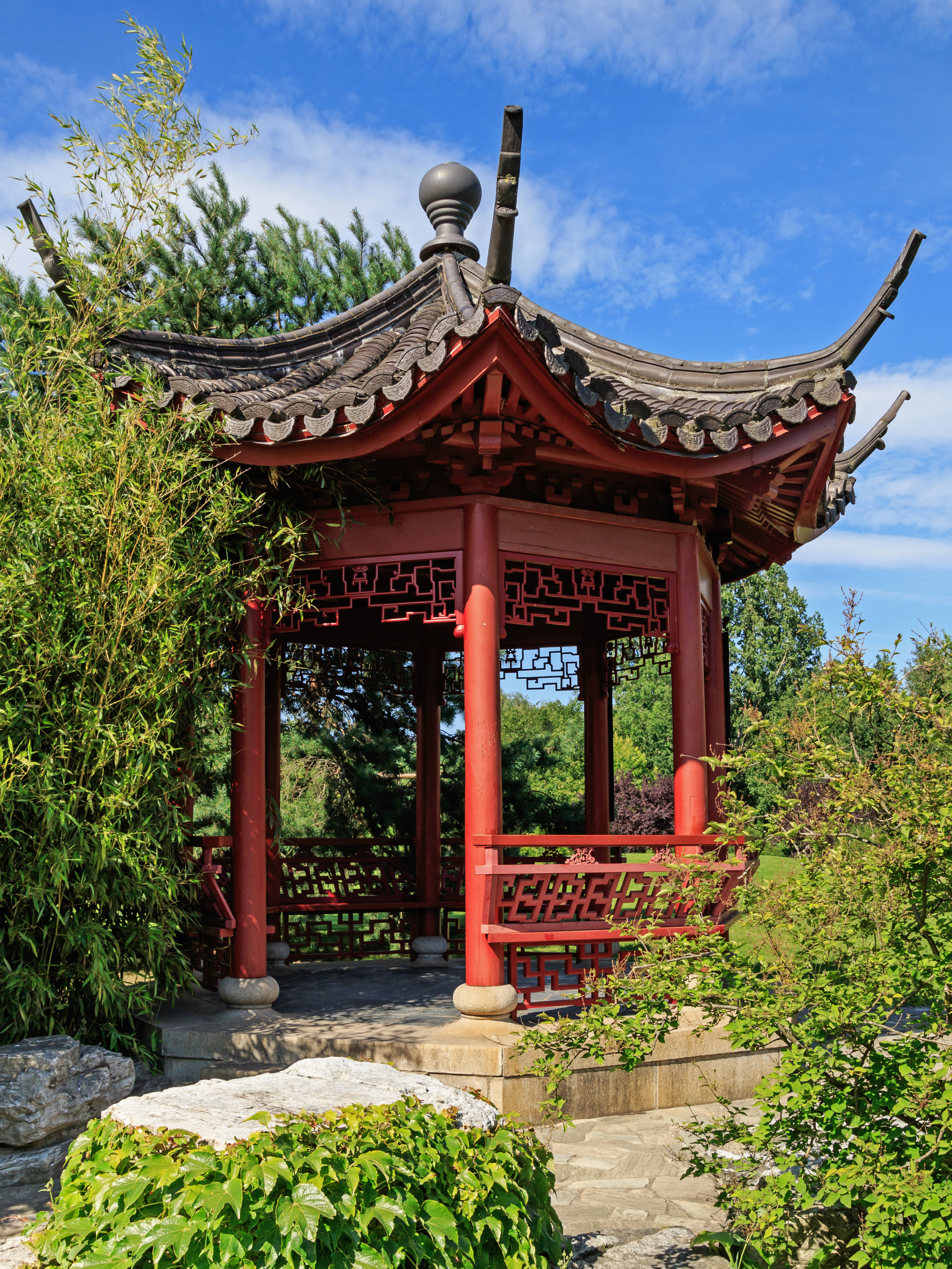
Pavilion in the Chinese garden

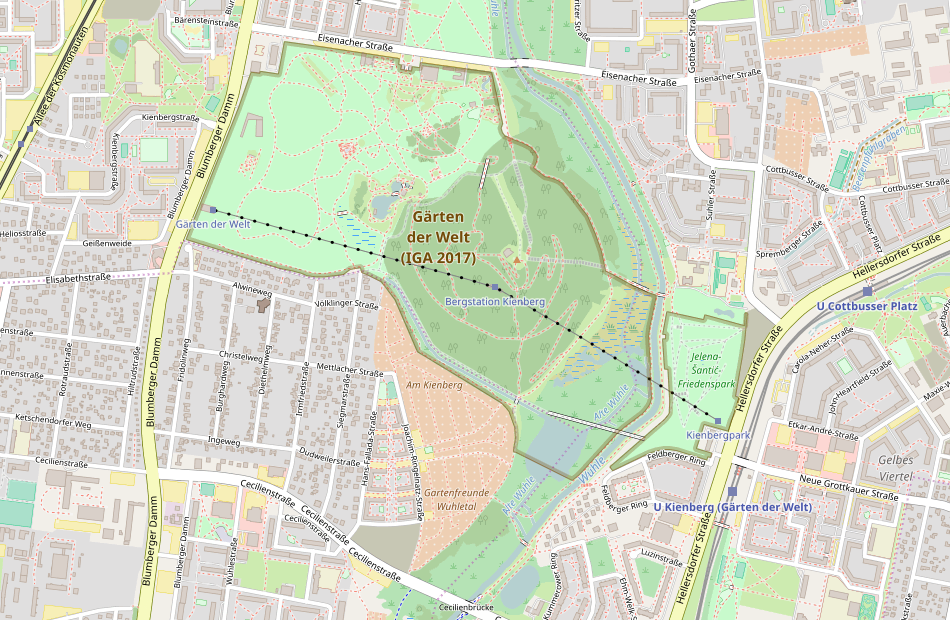
OSM map of the Erholungspark Marzahn showing the IGA Cable Car route. Nearest U-Bahn stations (right) and tramway stops (left) are shown in the map.

Gärten der Welt ("Gardens of the World") is a public park in Marzahn, Berlin. It was opened on 9 May 1987 as Berliner Gartenschau and was renamed Erholungspark Marzahn in 1991, before adopting its current name in 2017. The total area encompasses more than 100 hectares (250 acres).

== History ==
=== Overview ===
In 1991, the park was renamed to Erholungspark Marzahn. In October 2000, the Chinese garden is opened as a part of Gärten der Welt (Gardens of the World). This was followed by other gardens, including Oriental, Italian, Balinese, Korean, and Japanese. In 1995, it welcomed 132,000 visitors. By 2007 the number has increased to 650,000. The park was renamed to "Gärten der Welt" in 2017.

In 2018 the English garden was open in the park.

=== IGA 2017 ===
The park was chosen as the site of the Internationale Gartenausstellung 2017 (IGA 2017), an international horticultural exhibition.

=== Pura Tri Hita Karana ===
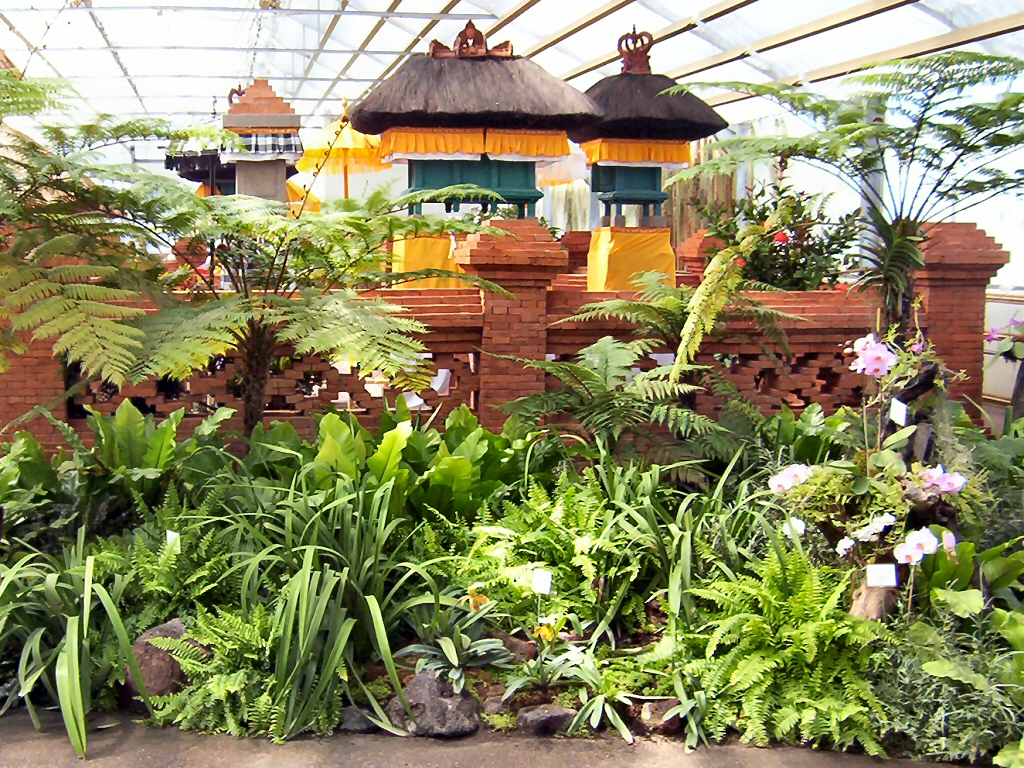
Pura Tri Hita Karana

Pura Tri Hita Karana is a functioning Hindu temple located in the Balinese Garden of the park. It is one of the few Hindu temples of Balinese architecture built outside Indonesia.

== Gärten der Welt ==
Theme	Area	Opened
Chinese garden	27,000 m^{2} (290,000 sq ft)	15 October 2000
Japanese garden	2,700 m^{2} (29,000 sq ft)	30 April 2003
Balinese garden	500 m^{2} (5,400 sq ft)	18 December 2003
Oriental-Islamic garden	6,100 m^{2} (66,000 sq ft)	7 July 2005
Korean garden	4,000 m^{2} (43,000 sq ft)	31 March 2006
Italian Renaissance garden	3,000 m^{2} (32,000 sq ft)	31 May 2008
English garden		2018
Christian garden		
Jewish garden	2,000 square metres	October 2021

In addition to the 11 Themed Gardens, Gärten der Welt also contains 9 International Artisan Gardens, or garden cabinets, featuring modern designs from landscape artists with connection to the respective countries, and often containing social commentary.

For example, the "Los Angeles Garden" representing the United States features a mock parking lot with a gated-off patch of grass, palm trees, and two parked SUVs. The artist Martin Kaltwasser modeled it off an actual parking lot in Santa Monica to address "the displacement of nature by industry," inviting visitors to "critically examine" an "overwhelmingly urban landscape."

== Transport ==
Nearest metro station is Kienberg (Gärten der Welt), on the U5 line. Named "Neue Grottkauer Straße" until 2016, it was renamed in that way for the IGA 2017. The station is also the eastern terminus of the IGA Cable Car (German: IGA-Seilbahn), a 1.5-kilometre-long (0.93 mi) aerial tramway line serving and crossing the park, built for the expo.
