= Leonora (film) =

- Directed by: Derek Strahan
- Written by: Derek Strahan
- Produced by: Geoffrey Brown
- Starring: Mandi Miller; David Evans; Leon Marvel; Angela Menzies-Wills
- Cinematography: Geoffrey Brown
- Production company: Revolve Pty Limited
- Distributed by: Showcase
- Release date: 1985
- Country: Australia
- Language: English
- Budget: A$500,000

Leonora is a 1985 Australian sex film about a couple who have an open marriage.

== Plot ==
Ex motor ace Simon Erickson pushes his wife Leonara into an open marriage. She has an affair with Mark Trainer.

== Release ==
The movie was not released theatrically and went straight to video.
