= Lenore RS Lim =

Filipino–Canadian–American artist

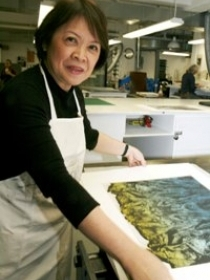
Lenore RS Lim in the studio

Lenore RS Lim is a Filipino–Canadian–American artist who specializes in printmaking. She is a recipient of the Philippine Presidential Award for Arts and the Jackson Pollock-Lee Krasner Foundation Grant. Lim has exhibited in Austria, Canada, France, Iraq, Italy, Japan, Jordan, the Philippines, Peru, the United Arab Emirates, and the United States. In 2005, she published a book entitled, "Profound Afterglow: The Prints of Lenore RS Lim". In 2009, she founded the Lenore RS Lim Foundation to aid young artists in furthering their education and in exhibiting their work around the world.

Lim graduated from the University of the Philippines College of Fine Arts in 1967. She continued her studies at the School of Visual Arts in New York City, where she learned computer art and printmaking techniques. There, Lim was able to master the modern techniques of lithography, solar etching, monotype, collotype, carbonundrum, and chine collé.

She has a website with a selection of her artwork:https://www.lenorelim.com/selected-work

,
