= Leonor Arfuch =

Argentine critic and academic (1945-2021)

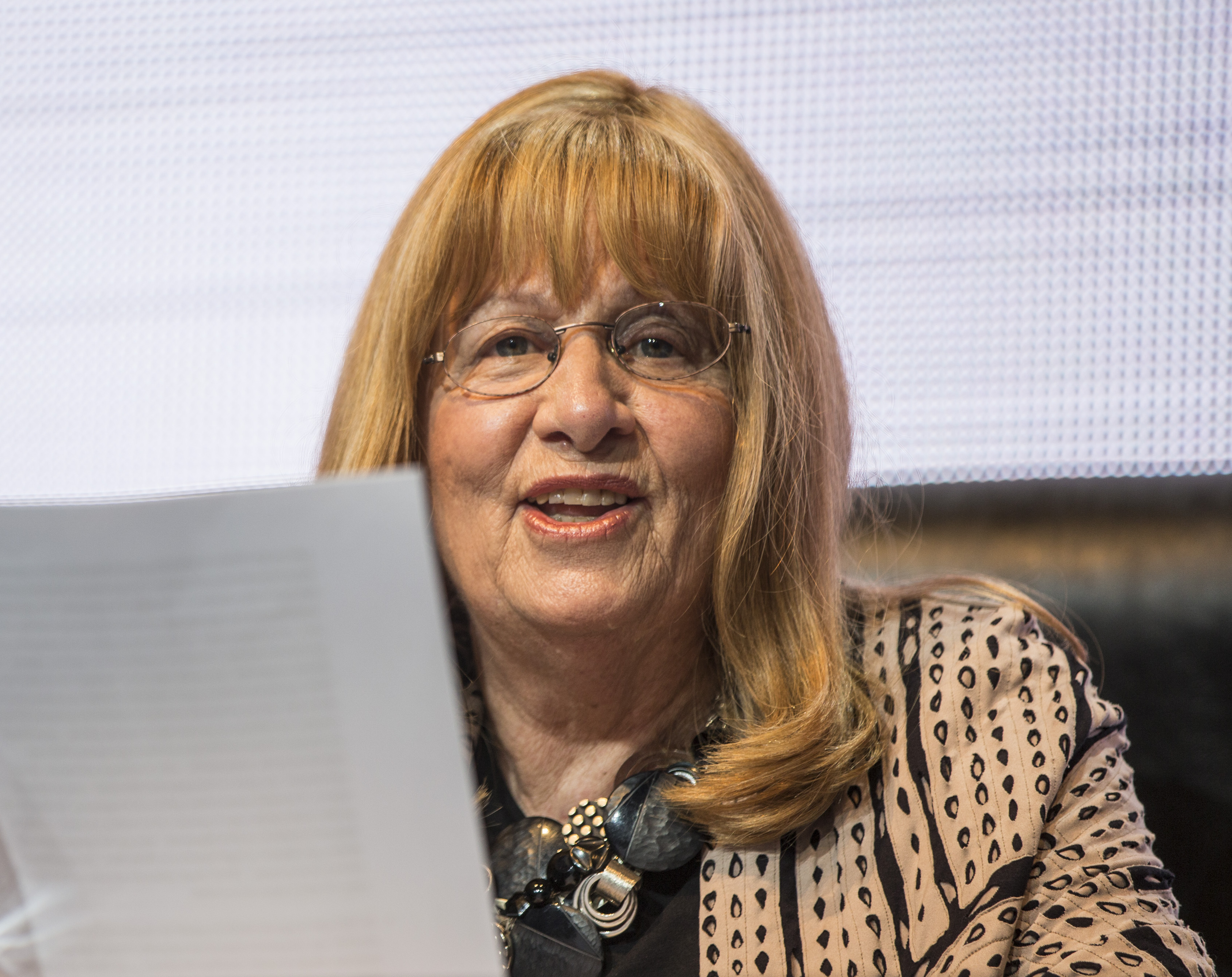
- Born: 9 May 1945; Buenos Aires, Argentina
- Died: October 2021 (aged 76)
- Occupations: Cultural critic; Communication studies scholar
- Children: 2
- Awards: Guggenheim Fellow (2007)

Academic background
- Education: University of Buenos Aires

Academic work
- Discipline: Communication studies
- Institutions: University of Buenos Aires

Leonor Arfuch (9 May 1945 – October 2021) was an Argentine critic and academic of communication studies. A professor at the University of Buenos Aires, her work included the book Memory and Autobiography. She was a 2007 Guggenheim Fellow.

== Biography ==
Arfuch was born on 9 May 1945 in Buenos Aires. She became an assistant professor at the University of Buenos Aires in 1984 and was promoted to full professor in 1987, before becoming a professor at the Faculty of Architecture, Design and Urbanism, University of Buenos Aires in 1993. She got her PhD in literature at the UBA in 2000, and joined the UBA's PhD program in 2002. She joined the Gino Germani Institute as a researcher in 1990.

Arfuch was a 1985-1986 Latin American Council of Social Sciences Fellow, a 1986-1989 National Scientific and Technical Research Council Fellow, and a 1998 Thalmann Fellow at UBA. In 2007, she was appointed a Guggenheim Fellow for "a study of identity, subjectivity, memory: narratives of the recent past".

Arfuch authored several books in fields like communication studies, one of which specialized in media coverage of the Trial of the Juntas. She often used feminist theory in her work. Thomas Cryer called her "a leading scholar of self-representation in contemporary culture", and Eva Alberione called her a "great essayist, cultural critic, and keen observer of the present [who] knew how to weave filigree with words, articulating rigorous analysis with a unique sensitivity."

In 2013, Arfuch published Memory and Autobiography, focusing on the genre of autobiography; it was later translated to English by Christina MacSweeney. In 2018, she published another book, La vida narrada. Memoria, subjetividad y política. In 2019, she worked as a co-organizer of an International Consortium of Critical Theory Programs seminar at the Centro Cultural de la Memoria Haroldo Conti.

Arfuch had two children.

Arfuch died in October 2021.

== Bibliography ==
- El espacio biográfico (2002)
- Memory and Autobiography (2013)
