= Boubín =

Coordinates: 48°59′28″N 13°49′06″E

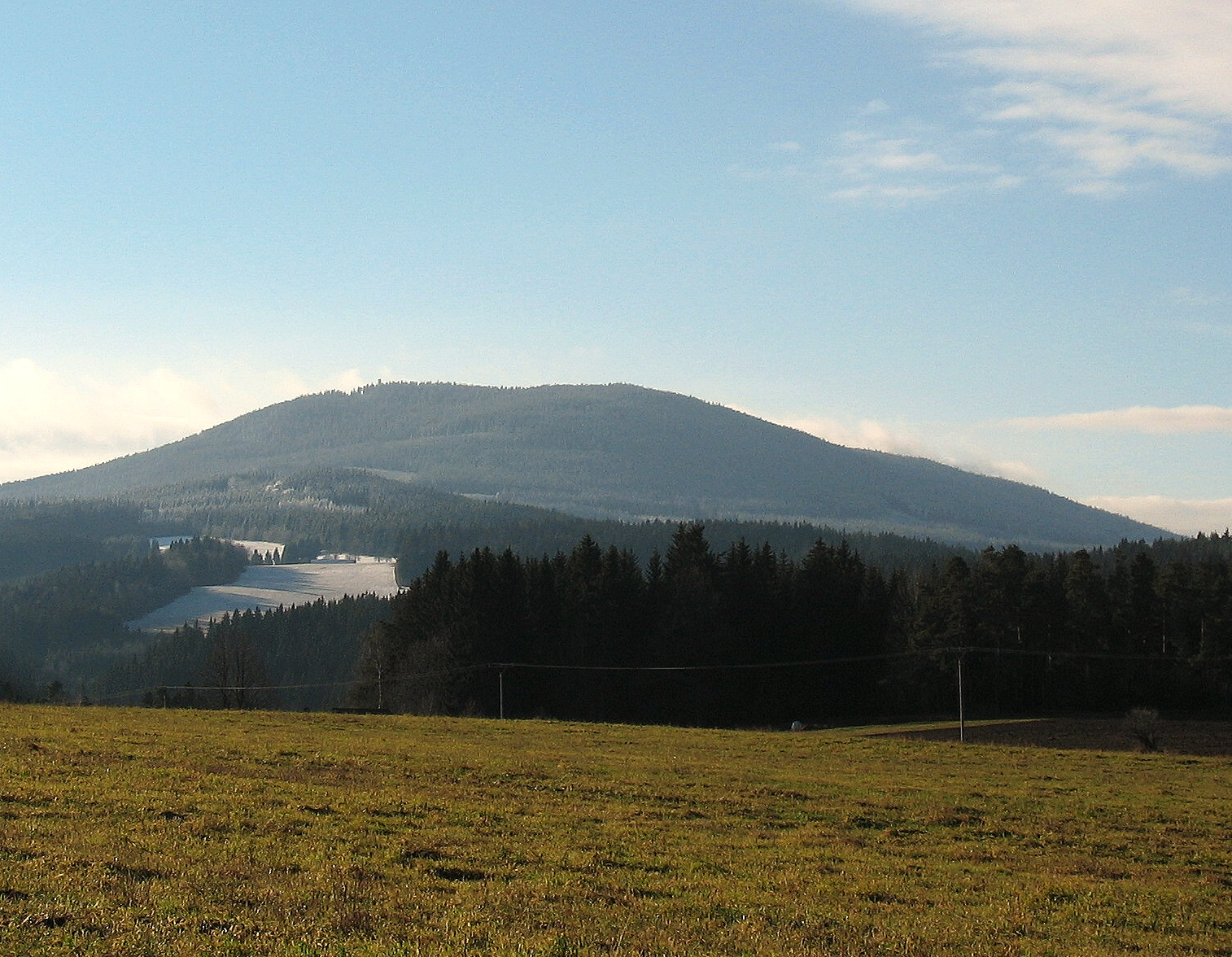
Boubín Hill in South Bohemian region.

Boubín is a 1362 m high hill in the South Bohemian region of the Czech Republic. It is located 3.5 km east of the village of Kubova Huť. Most of the hill is covered by a primeval forest called Boubínský prales which, has been a natural preserve since 1858.
