= Lenora de Barros =

Brazilian artist and poet (born 1953)

- Born: November 6, 1953 (age 72); São Paulo, SP
- Education: University of São Paulo
- Notable work: Onde Se Vê (1983), Ping-poema (1990-), ... umas (1993-1996), Procuro-me (2001), Pregação (2014)

Lenora de Barros (São Paulo, SP, 1953) is a Brazilian artist and poet. She studied linguistics at the University of São Paulo before establishing her artistic practice during the 1970s, and has remained committed to the exploration of language through a variety of media, including video, performance, photography and installation.

Barros started out working with visual poetry. Her early work was influenced concrete poetry, particularly the Noigandres group, and incorporated techniques from pop art, body art, and conceptual art.

Her work has evolved to a focus on the sonority of words, particularly through sound installations and voice performances.

== Work ==
Lenora de Barros started working in the 1970s, simultaneously exploring verbal and visual communication through poetry.

In 1983, she exhibited a video with poems at the 17th São Paulo Art Biennial. That same year, Barros published Onde Se Vê, an artist book featuring photography and concrete poetry set in progressive fonts and layouts. The photographic sequence of a tongue interacting with the keys of a typewriter marked the artist's turn to a more visual exploration of linguistic themes as a visual pun on the word "lingua" - that in Portuguese can mean both "language" and "tongue".

The use performances documented through of photography or video permeates the artist's work.

In 1990, Barros began her ongoing project Ping-poemas, a broad group of works that appropriate elements of table tennis. With Poesia é coisa de nada exhibited that year in Milan, she featured 5000 balls imprinted with the name of the exhibition scattered through the gallery floor with one poised on a velvet cushion. She would return the ping-pong balls creating a visual and sound installation for the 1994 Arte Cidade, in São Paulo. She expanded her table tennis repertoire in Ping-poema para Boris (2000), making use of rackets, nets and ping-pong tables. More recently, in Volume Morto (2015), Barros created another visual and sound installation with ping-pong balls dropping down from a water container onto the tiles of an empty swimming pool as a comment on the drought that was plaguing São Paulo.

Between 1993 and 1996, Barros wrote an experimental weekly column for the newspaper Jornal da Tarde, in São Paulo, entitled “… umas”. She published numerous photo-performances, visual poems, and poetic texts, experimenting with graphic design, and proposing new relationships between text and image, as well as creating dialogues with other artists. She would use many of the initial ideas explored in "… umas" as the starting point for other artworks, going as far as calling the column a "laboratory for many experiences”. Lenora de Barros exhibited the columns in 2014 at Pivô, in downtown São Paulo. There, the artist filmed two new video installations, in which she plays checkers against herself and performs some of the texts written for "… umas".

During the 1990s, she was also the photography editor at Folha de São Paulo, and the art director of the sports magazine Placar.

Lenora de Barros has had group and solo shows in renowned institutions in Brazil and abroad, including Paço Imperial in Rio de Janeiro, the Museum of Modern Art in Rio de Janeiro, Casa Daros, also in Rio, the Banco do Nordeste Cultural Center in Fortaleza, and the Proa Foundation in Buenos Aires. She has participated in three São Paulo Biennials (the 17th, in 1983, the 24th, in 1998, and the 29th, in 2010), and in two Mercosul Biennials in Porto Alegre (the 5th, in 2005 and the 7th, in 2009).

Her works are featured in the collections of the Museu d’Art Conteporani, in Barcelona, Daros Latinoamerica, São Paulo Museum of Modern Art, and the Centro Cultural São Paulo.

== Personal life ==
Lenora is the daughter of one of the pioneers of Concrete art in Brazil, Geraldo de Barros, and the sister of the Switzerland-based artist Fabiana de Barros.
