= Leonor de La Guerra =

Venezuelan activist (died 1816)

Leonor de La Guerra y Vega Ramírez (died 1816) was a Venezuelan protester against the Spanish Colonial administration during the Venezuelan War of Independence. Despite being whipped 200 times by Spanish soldiers, Leonor refused to name her fellow sympathizers or renounce her beliefs.

== Biography ==
Born in Cumaná, Leonor was the daughter of Luis Beltrán de la Guerra, councilman, attorney and trustee. Her mother was Rosa Ramirez Valderrín Antonia. She had at least two brothers, Luis Guerra Ramírez de la Vega, and Vega Ramirez. She married Joseph Tinedo by whom she had a daughter, Francisca Antonia.

On one day in 1816, Leonor peered out her window wearing a blue hair ribbon, blue being the color of the separatist forces. She was arrested by Spanish forces. Colonel Juan Aldama threatened Leonor with torture if she did not recant her political convictions and reveal fellow sympathizers. Leonor refused.

From a young age, she supported the cause of independence. Like her father, she is remembered for her act of rebellion against the royal forces, wearing a blue ribbon in her hair. It ultimately cost her her life. For punishment, Leonor was paraded through Cumaná on a donkey while receiving 200 lashes. Around every corner, she was admonished to give in, to which she always replied "Viva la Patria, death to the tyrants!" After fainting, Leonor was taken home. From then on, she refused food and medical care. Leonor died in Cumaná later in 1816.

The school Unidad Educativa Leonor de la Guerra in Nueva Esparta, Venezuela, is named in her honor.
