= Eleanor (sloop) =

- ELEANOR (Sailing Sloop)
- U.S. National Register of Historic Places
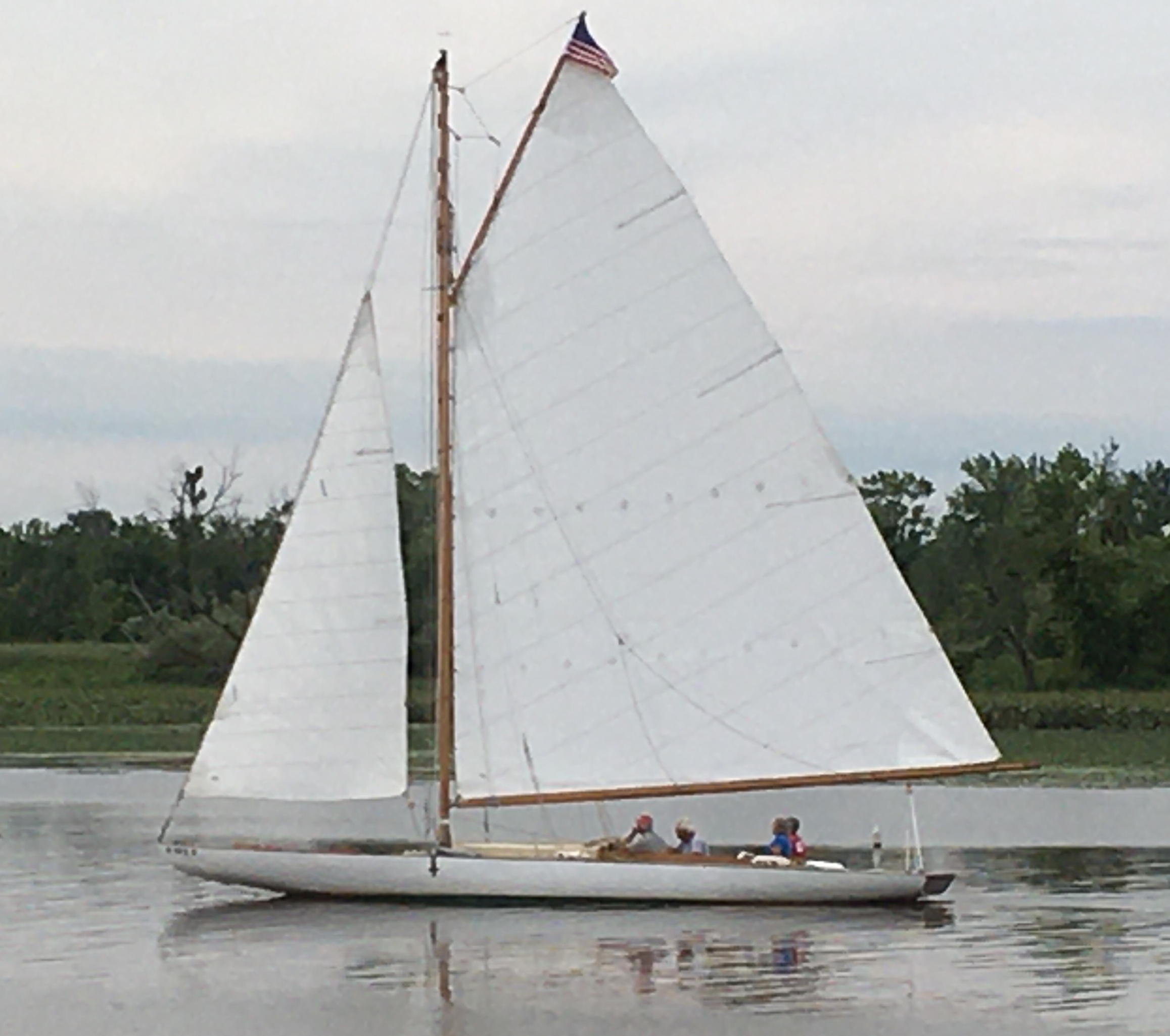
- Restored 1903 Raceabout class sloop Eleanor in 2020

- Location within New York Location within the United States
- Location: Off Lower Main St. in Catskill Creek, Catskill (village), New York
- Coordinates: 42°12′44″N 73°51′41″W
- Area: less than one acre
- Built: 1903
- Architect: Clinton H. Crane
- NRHP reference No.: 82001174
- Added to NRHP: December 27, 1982

The Eleanor is a historic gaff-rigged racing sloop built in 1903 at the B. F. Wood shipyard, City Island, Bronx and designed by Clinton H. Crane. She is homeported at the Catskill Marina, 10 Greene St., Catskill, New York. Her hull is 36 feet (11 m) in length and around 28 feet (8.5 m) at the waterline, her beam is 8.5 feet (2.6 m), and her draft is 4.5 feet (1.4 m).

She was listed on the National Register of Historic Places in 1982.

Starting in 2010, Eleanor's restoration was undertaken by the Hudson River Historic Boat Restoration and Sailing Society. The restoration was completed in 2020. The Eleanor is owned, maintained, and sailed by the Hudson River Historic Boat Restoration and Sailing Society.
