= Mount Eleanor =

Mountain in Alaska, United States

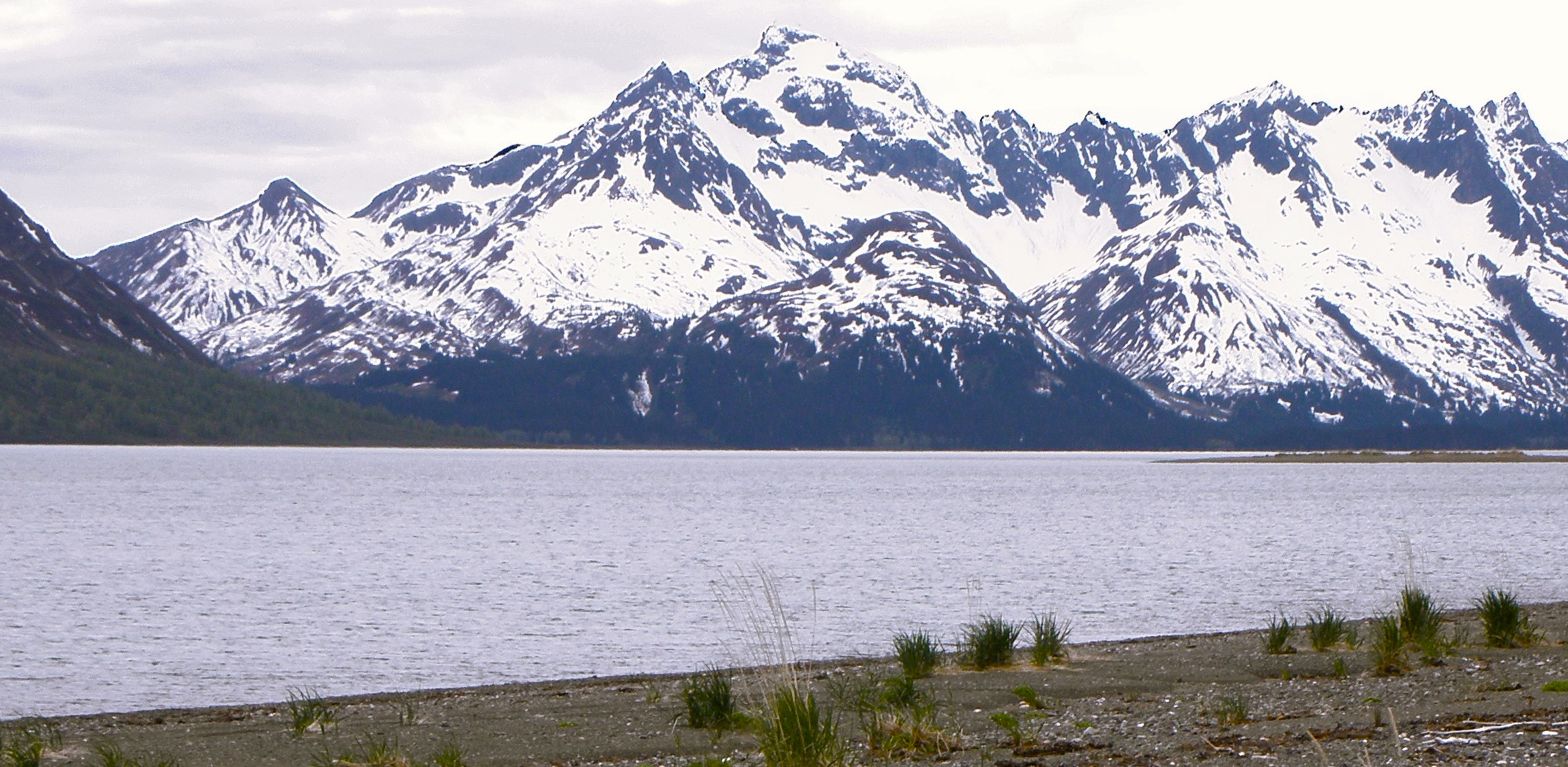
- Northeast aspect

Highest point
- Elevation: 3,988 ft (1,216 m)
- Prominence: 2,538 ft (774 m)
- Parent peak: Peak 4050
- Isolation: 5.97 mi (9.61 km)
- Coordinates: 59°46′50″N 153°21′49″W

Geography
- Location within Alaska
- Interactive map of Mount Eleanor
- Country: United States
- State: Alaska
- Borough: Kenai Peninsula Borough
- Parent range: Chigmit Mountains; Aleutian Range
- Topo map: USGS Iliamna D-1

Mount Eleanor is a 3,988-foot (1,216 m) mountain summit in the US state of Alaska.

== Description ==
Mount Eleanor is located in the Chigmit Mountains of the Aleutian Range. The mountain is situated 145 mi (233 km) southwest of Anchorage, 65 mi (105 km) west of Homer, and six miles south of Lake Clark National Park. Precipitation runoff from the mountain drains west to Iniskin Bay and east to Chinitna Bay, thence Cook Inlet. Although modest in elevation, topographic relief is significant as the summit rises up from tidewater at Iniskin Bay in two miles. The mountain's name was published in 1905 by G. C. Martin, U.S. Geological Survey, and the toponym has been officially adopted by the U.S. Board on Geographic Names. The namesake is not recorded.

== Climate ==
Based on the Köppen climate classification, Mount Eleanor is located in a subarctic climate zone, with long, cold, snowy winters, and cool summers. Winter temperatures can drop below 0 °F with wind chill factors below −10 °F. The months May through June offer the most favorable weather for viewing or climbing the peak.

== See also ==
- Geography of Alaska
