= List of storms named Eleanor =

The name Eleanor has been used for four tropical cyclones worldwide.

In the Eastern Pacific Ocean:

- Tropical Storm Eleanor (1967)
- Tropical Storm Eleanor (1971)
- Tropical Storm Eleanor (1975)

In the South-West Indian Ocean:

- Tropical Storm Eleanor (2024), a severe tropical storm that affected Mauritius and Reunion

The name Eleanor has also been used once in the UK and Ireland's windstorm naming system.

- Storm Eleanor (2018)

== See also ==
- Cyclone Elinor (1983), made landfall in Australia in March 1983
