= Kienberg (Gärten der Welt) station =

Station of the Berlin U-Bahn

Coordinates: 52°31′43″N 13°35′26″E

Kienberg (Gärten der Welt)
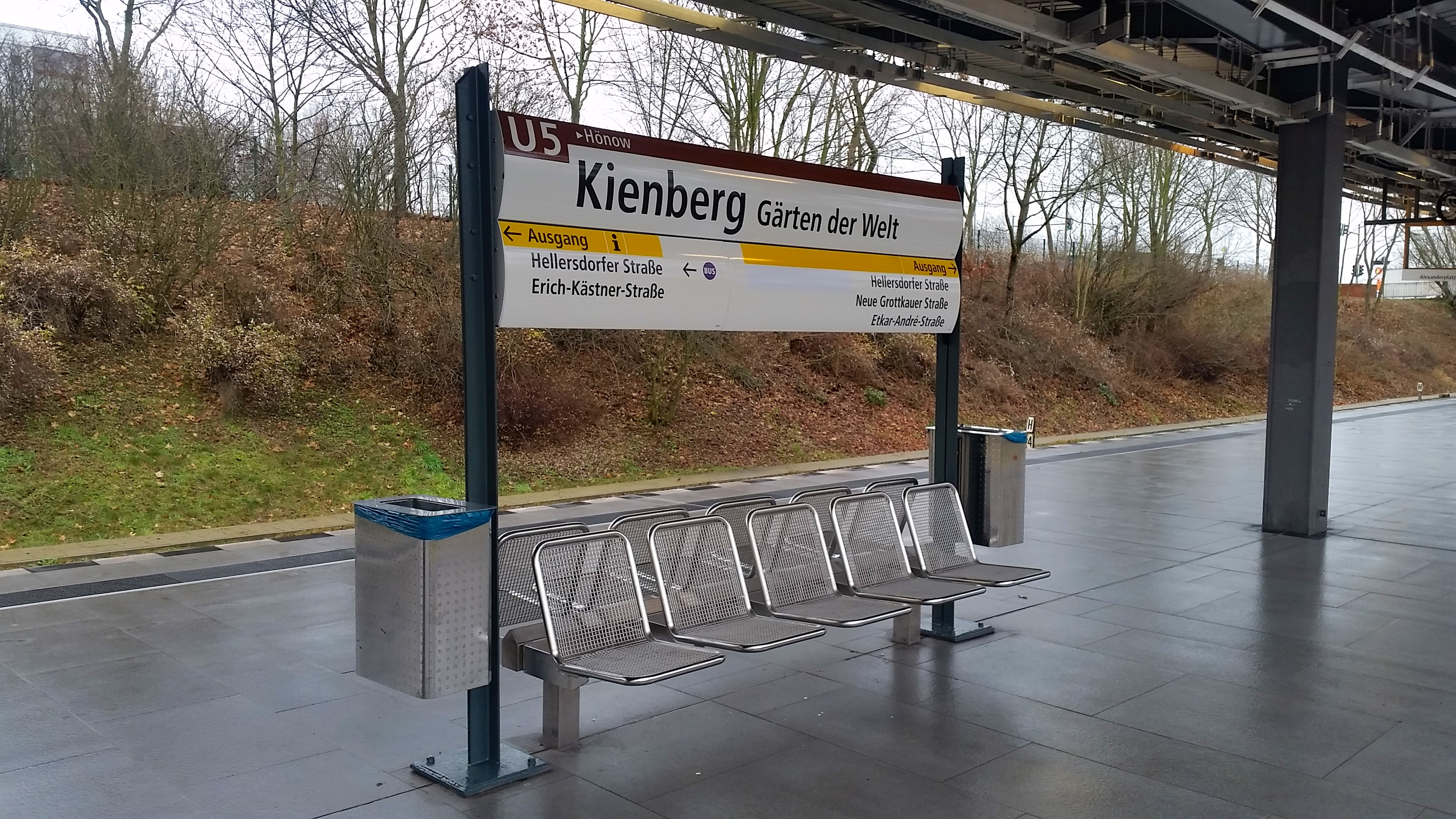

General information
- Location: Hellersdorfer Straße, Berlin; Marzahn-Hellersdorf; Germany
- Owner: Berliner Verkehrsbetriebe
- Operator: Berliner Verkehrsbetriebe
- Platforms: 1 island platform
- Tracks: 2
- Train operators: Berliner Verkehrsbetriebe
- Connections: 197

Construction
- Structure type: Terrain cutting

Other information
- Fare zone: VBB: Berlin B/5656

History
- Opened: 1 July 1989; 37 years ago

Services
Preceding station	Berlin U-Bahn	Following station
Kaulsdorf-Nord towards Berlin Hbf	U5	Cottbusser Platz towards Hönow
Location

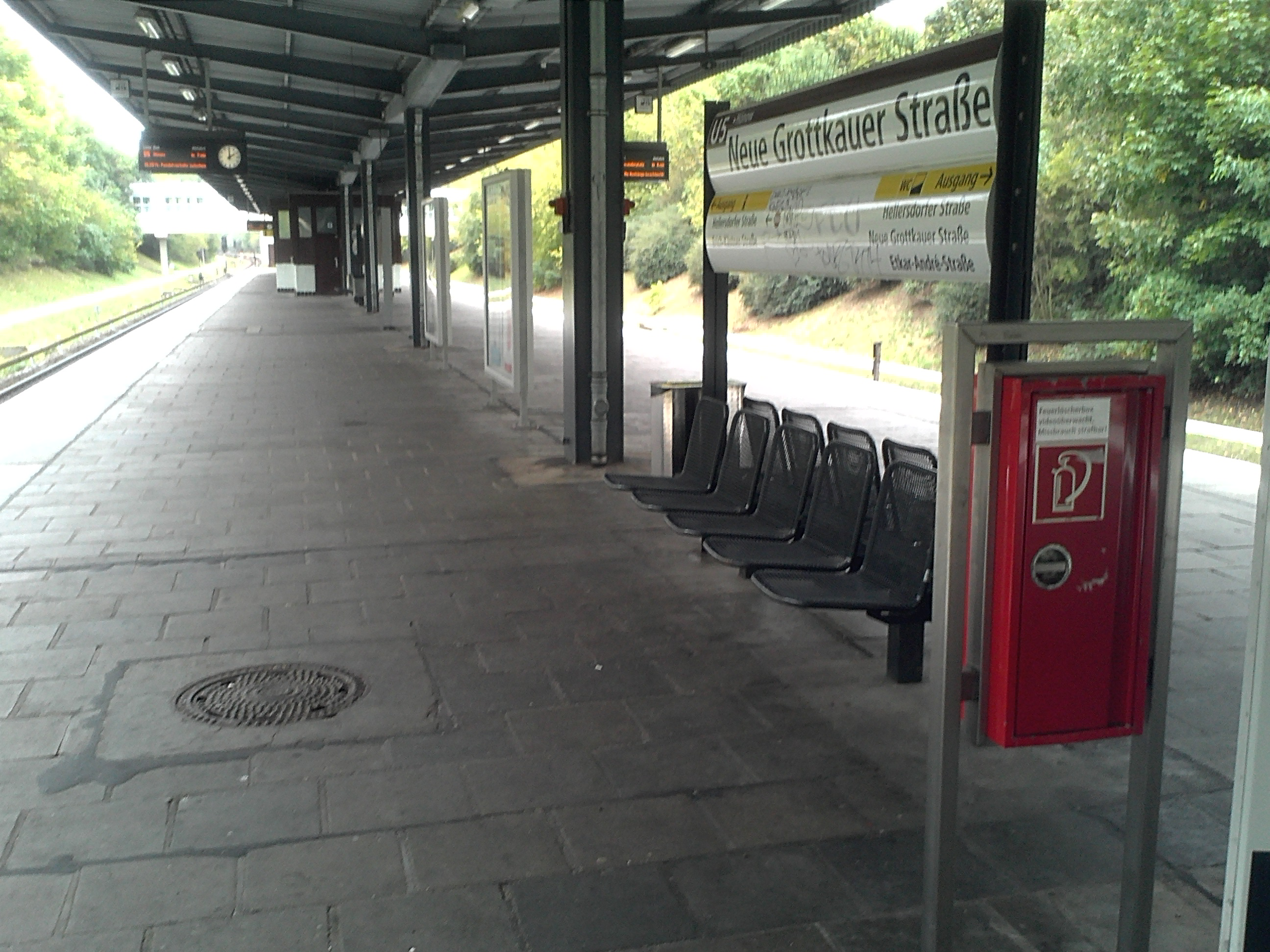
Platform view

Kienberg (Gärten der Welt) is a station on the U-Bahn in the German capital city of Berlin. It is located on the U5 line.

== Location ==
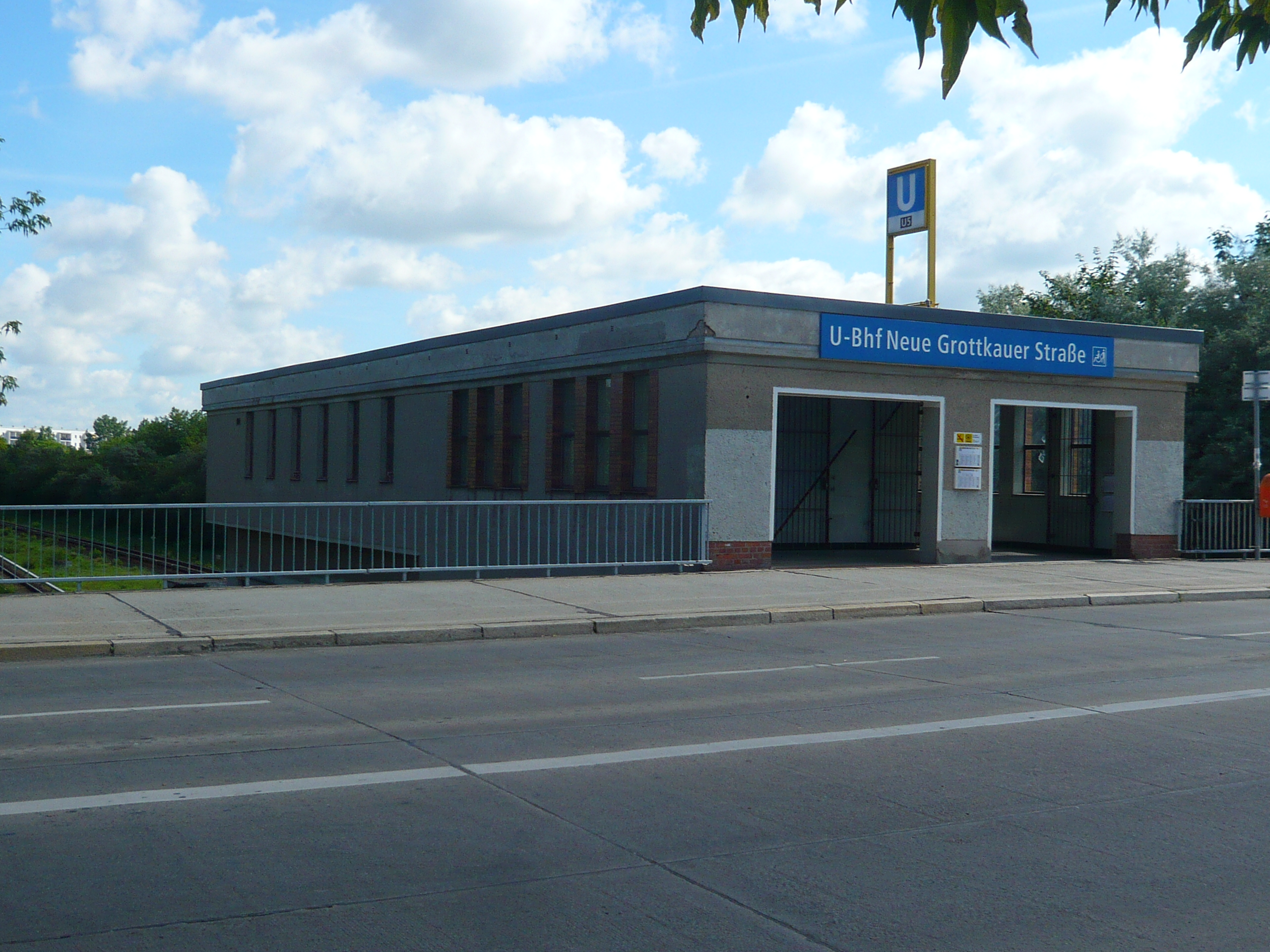
1989 station building in 2011.

The underground station is located in the section east of Hellersdorfer Straße. It has a central platform covered by a one-piece reinforced concrete structure. The color of the station, which can be found on the roof supports and in the entrance area, is gray. There are outputs at two sides: in the south, via a pedestrian bridge to Hellersdorfer Straße and Erich-Kästner-Straße; and in the north, to Neue Grottkauer Straße. The latter also has a ramp for barrier-free access, supplemented by a lift in the course of construction work on the occasion of the International Garden Exhibition 2017 in December 2016.

== History ==
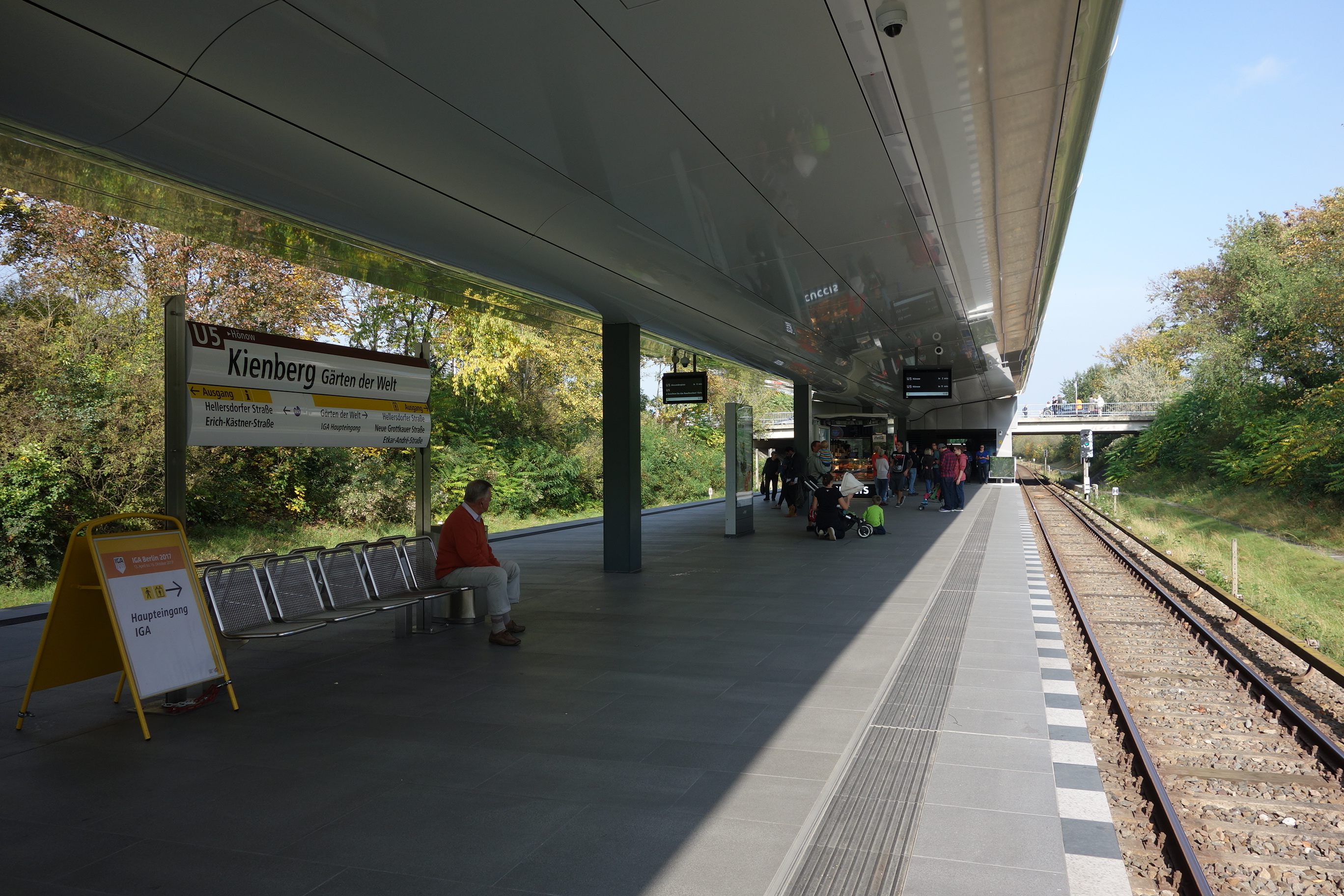
Refurbished platform in 2017.

The station opened in July 1989, just a few months before the fall of the Berlin Wall. The eastern extension of (what is now) line U5 was one of the last major construction projects of the former German Democratic Republic.

The planned name of the station was Kaulsdorf-Nordost. However, when it opened the station's name was Heinz-Hoffmann-Straße (named after Heinz Hoffmann, general of the GDR army). In 1991 it got the name Grottkauer Straße, then in 1996 it got the new name Neue Grottkauer Straße. In 2016, the station was renamed again into Kienberg (Gärten der Welt) due to the international horticultural exhibition Internationale Gartenausstellung 2017 (IGA 2017).

== Services ==
The station is the eastern terminus of the IGA Cable Car (German: IGA-Seilbahn), an aerial tramway serving the Erholungspark Marzahn, built for the IGA 2017.
