= Beautiful Friendship (song) =

Song by Continental Uptight Band

from the album Beautiful Friendship
- A-side: "Beautiful Friendship"
- B-side: "Refugee"
- Released: 1970
- Label: Imperial 5C 006-24242
- Composer: Barbara Ruskin
- Producer: Frank Jansen

Beautiful Friendship was a 1970 song for the Continental Uptight Band. It was a Top 40 hit for them in Holland that year.

== Background ==
The song was written by Barbara Ruskin. The Continental Uptight Band recorded the song and released it with "Refugee as the B side. In Holland, it was released on Imperial 5C 006-24242. And in Germany it was released on Columbia 1C 006-24 242.

The Continental Uptight Band album of the same name was released on Columbia SCX 6454 in 1971.

== Charts ==
The Continental Uptight Band's single entered the Dutch Top 40 at no. 40 on 24 October 1970. Staying in the chart for another week, it peaked at no. 36.

== Later years ==
Barbara Ruskin had her own version released. Backed "Yesterday's Coffee", it was released on President PT 369 in 1972. She did perform the song on Granada Television's Lift Off with Ayshea on 28 June 1972. This was her final single release.
