= Lenora (Prachatice District) =

- Municipality
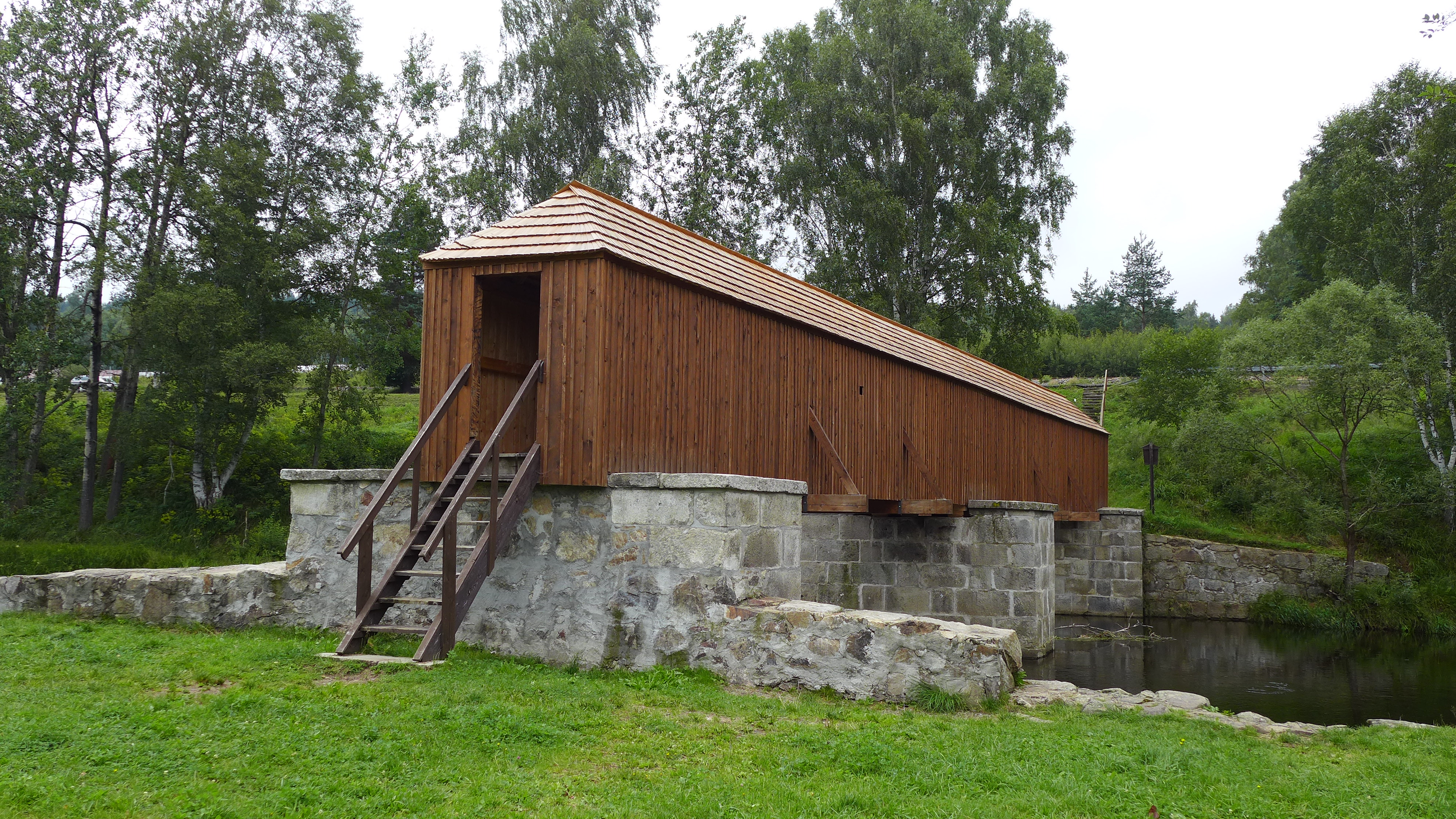
- Lenora wooden bridge

- Flag Coat of arms

- Location in the Czech Republic
- Coordinates: 48°55′21″N 13°47′36″E
- Country: Czech Republic
- Region: South Bohemian
- District: Prachatice
- Founded: 1834

Area
  - Total: 17.79 km^{2} (6.87 sq mi)
- Elevation: 765 m (2,510 ft)

Population (2026-01-01)
  - Total: 646
  - Density: 36.3/km^{2} (94.0/sq mi)
- Time zone: UTC+1 (CET)
  - Summer (DST): UTC+2 (CEST)
- Postal codes: 384 42, 384 51
- Website: www.lenora.cz

Lenora (German: Eleonorenhain) is a municipality and village in Prachatice District in the South Bohemian Region of the Czech Republic. It has about 600 inhabitants.

Lenora lies approximately 17 kilometres (11 mi) south-west of Prachatice, 50 km (31 mi) west of České Budějovice, and 137 km (85 mi) south of Prague.

== Administrative division ==
Lenora consists of five municipal parts (in brackets population according to the 2021 census):

- Lenora (494)
- Houžná (46)
- Kaplice (3)
- Vlčí Jámy (17)
- Zátoň (71)

== History ==
Lenora was founded in 1834 as one of the last glassworks in the Bohemian Forest.

== Demographics ==
Historical population
Year	Pop.	±%
1869	1,689	—
1880	1,542	−8.7%
1890	1,789	+16.0%
1900	1,832	+2.4%
1910	1,698	−7.3%
1921	1,672	−1.5%
1930	1,854	+10.9%
1950	934	−49.6%
1961	861	−7.8%
1970	835	−3.0%
1980	833	−0.2%
1991	861	+3.4%
2001	803	−6.7%
2011	776	−3.4%
2021	631	−18.7%
Source: Censuses
