= Continental Uptight Band =

Dutch band

- Origin: Netherlands
- Genres: Pop
- Years active: 1969 - 1980
- Label: Imperial
- Past members: Bud Bergsma; Peter Legler; Maarten Stoopendaal; Onno Stoopendaal; Ritty Van Straalen; Letty Verhoef; Remco Wellerdieck

The Continental Uptight Band were a Dutch band who had a few hits during the 1970s.

== Background ==
formed in 1969 in Utrecht, and active till 1980. The and comprised Bud Bergsma, Letty Verhoef, Maarten Stoopendaal, Onno Stoopendaal, Peter Legler, Remco Wellerdieck and Ritty Van Straalen. They had three hit singles in the Netherlands with "Please Sing A Song For Us", "Beautiful Friendship" and "On the Ride (You Do It Once, You Do It Twice)".

== Career ==
The group recorded Barbara Ruskin's song, "Beautiful Friendship". It entered the Dutch Top 40 at no. 40 on 24 October 1970 and stayed in the chart for another week, peaking at no. 36.

== Discography ==
- Beautiful Friendship 1970
- Roots 1972
