= Loučovice =

- Municipality
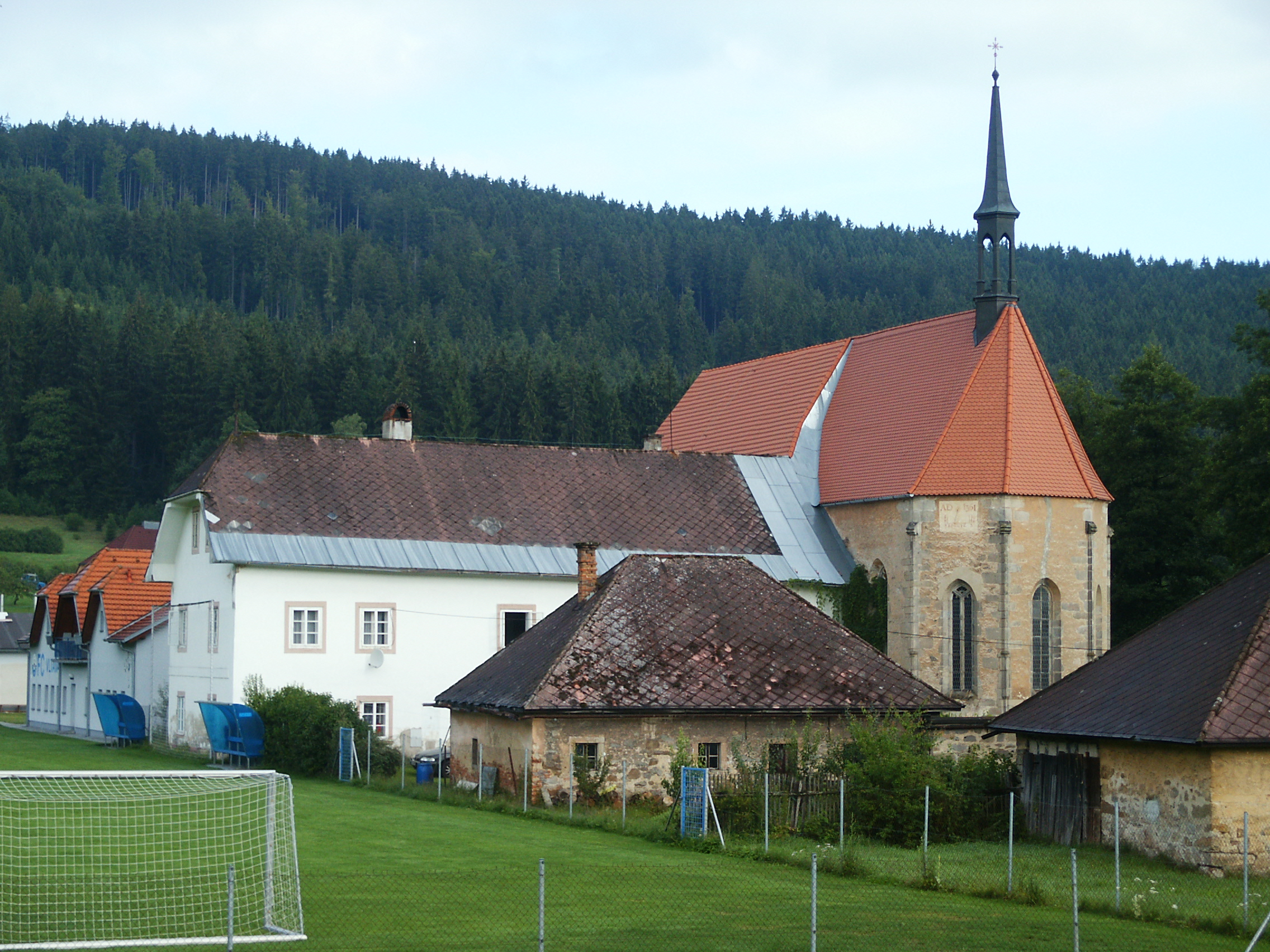
- Church of Saint Ulrich

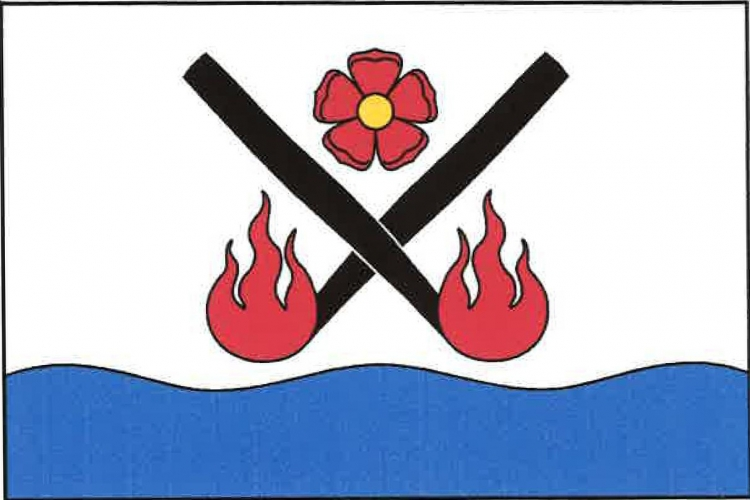
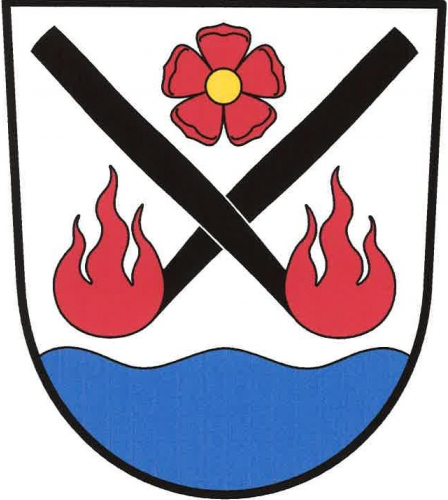
- Flag Coat of arms

- Location in the Czech Republic
- Coordinates: 48°37′13″N 14°15′27″E
- Country: Czech Republic
- Region: South Bohemian
- District: Český Krumlov
- First mentioned: 1361

Area
  - Total: 41.97 km^{2} (16.20 sq mi)
- Elevation: 663 m (2,175 ft)

Population (2026-01-01)
  - Total: 1,469
  - Density: 35.00/km^{2} (90.65/sq mi)
- Time zone: UTC+1 (CET)
  - Summer (DST): UTC+2 (CEST)
- Postal code: 382 76
- Website: www.loucovice.info

Loučovice (German: Kienberg) is a municipality and village in Český Krumlov District in the South Bohemian Region of the Czech Republic. It has about 1,500 inhabitants.

== Administrative division ==
Loučovice consists of two municipal parts (in brackets population according to the 2021 census):

- Loučovice (1,442)
- Nové Domky (3)

== Etymology ==
Loučovice was named after a nearby mountain, which was formerly called Loučovice, but today is called Luč. The name of the mountain has its origin in the Czech word louč ('torch') and refers to a forest whose trees were suitable for making torches. The historical German name Kienberg has similar etymology.

== Geography ==
Loučovice is located about 21 kilometres (13 mi) south of Český Krumlov and 41 km (25 mi) southwest of České Budějovice. The municipality borders Austria in the south. It lies in the Bohemian Forest mountains. The highest point is the Hvězdná mountain at 1,012 m (3,320 ft) above sea level. The Vltava River flows through the municipality.

Most of the municipal territory lies in the Vyšebrodsko Nature Park. There are several small-scale protected areas; the most valuable is Čertova stěna-Luč National Nature Reserve with giant stones.

== History ==
The first written mention of Loučovice is from 1361, when the village was owned by Vyšší Brod Monastery. The village was burned down in 1420 together with the monastery by Taborites, and renewed after the Thirty Years' War.

In the 1880s, entrepreneur Arnošt Porák founded a large paper mill in Loučovice, which employed more than 1,000 workers at its peak. Electrified railway built in 1909–1911 reached Loučovice.

Between 1938 and 1945, the area was annexed by Nazi Germany and administered as part of the Reichsgau Sudetenland. After the expulsion of German population in 1945, many smaller hamlets in the area disappeared but Loučovice grew up. In 1950, Loučovice became a standalone municipality and several villages were merged with Loučovice.

== Demographics ==
Historical population

Year	Pop.	±%
1869	1,569	—
1880	1,570	+0.1%
1890	1,678	+6.9%
1900	1,806	+7.6%
1910	2,181	+20.8%

Year	Pop.	±%
1921	2,559	+17.3%
1930	2,948	+15.2%
1950	1,789	−39.3%
1961	2,154	+20.4%
1970	2,076	−3.6%

Year	Pop.	±%
1980	2,143	+3.2%
1991	2,043	−4.7%
2001	1,970	−3.6%
2011	1,627	−17.4%
2021	1,445	−11.2%

Source: Censuses

== Transport ==
In the southwestern tip of the municipal territory is a road border crossing with Austria named Přední Výtoň / Guglwald.

Loučovice is located on the railway line of local importance heading from Lipno nad Vltavou to Rybník.

== Sights ==
The Church of Saint Ulrich was built as a late Gothic chapel at the end of the 15th century. After it was destroyed by fire, it was completely rebuilt in the 16th century, and then baroque modified in the 17th century.
