= Leonora =

Leonora or Leonara may refer to:

== People ==
- Leonora (given name), a feminine given name
- Leonora of Castile (disambiguation)
- Leonora of England (1162–1216), Queen of Castile and Toledo as wife of Alfonso VIII of Castile
- Leonora (singer) (born 1998), Danish singer representing her country at the Eurovision Song Contest 2019
- John Leonora (1928–2006), research scientist, Loma Linda University

== Places ==
- Leonora, Guyana
- Leonora, Western Australia
- Shire of Leonora, a local government area of Western Australia

== Arts and entertainment ==
- Leonora (opera), the original title of Ludwig van Beethoven's opera Fidelio, in which the heroine is named Leonora (or Leonore in German)
- Leonora (opera) by William Henry Fry (the first known performance of an opera by an American composer on March 18, 1845)
- Leonora (opera), the 1804 opera by Ferdinando Paer based on the same source as the work by Beethoven
- Leonora, heroine of the opera Il trovatore, the 1853 opera by Giuseppe Verdi based on the 1836 drama El trovador by Antonio García Gutiérrez
- Leonora, heroine of the opera La forza del destino, the 1862 opera by Giuseppe Verdi based on the 1835 drama Don Álvaro o la fuerza del sino by Ángel de Saavedra, 3rd Duke of Rivas
- Leonora, another name for Lenore (ballad), by Gottfried August Bürger
- Leonora (novel), by Maria Edgeworth
- Leonora (film), a 1984 Australian film
- Leonora, a novel by Hazel Holt
- Leonora, a novel by Arnold Bennett
- Leonora, the main character of a brief narrative pocket in Henry Fielding's Joseph Andrews

== Other ==
- 696 Leonora, a minor planet

== See also ==
- Lenora (disambiguation)
- Leonora (disambiguation)
