= Lenore Raphael =

- Born: Lenore Hyams; June 1, 1942 (age 83); New York City, New York, U.S.
- Genres: Jazz
- Occupation(s): Musician, composer, educator
- Instrument: Piano
- Website: www.lenoreraphael.com

Lenore Raphael (born Lenore Hyams; June 1, 1942) is an American jazz pianist and educator influenced by Oscar Peterson, Bill Evans, and George Shearing.

== Early life ==
Raphael was born in New York City. She studied classical music at the High School of Music & Art in Manhattan, going on to New York University, where she received a Bachelor of Arts degree in music. As a teenage prodigy, she performed in a classical concert at Carnegie Hall. She gave up a career as a music teacher and switched to playing jazz professionally after hearing Oscar Peterson in concert. She studied jazz piano under Barry Harris and Mike Longo.

== Later life and career ==
Raphael has performed with Lionel Hampton, Ken Peplowski, Illinois Jacquet and Clark Terry .

A composer as well as performer, her tribute tune to Oscar Peterson following his death ("Blues for OP") premièred at a memorial concert for Peterson at the International Association for Jazz Convention in Toronto, Ontario. Her compositions also include the jazz standard "Johnny Jazz".

Raphael usually records with bassist Hilliard Greene and drummer Rudy Lawless.

Raphael has taught piano throughout her career, and with the assistance of a string of long-established jazz musicians put together a program for elementary school students to teach them the history of jazz. She and vocalist Janet Lawson created the videotaped lessons, and had guest input from the likes of Clark Terry, Arnie Lawrence and Ray and Billy Drummond. The series has become a model for teaching young students the fundamentals of jazz in the curriculum of many schools. Committed to spreading the jazz message to children, Raphael has co-created with Marcia Hillman a book-and-tape series called Scat Cat's Adventures in Jazzland. Raphael has also published a jazz theory book for senior students.

An authorised and accredited Steinway Artist, Raphael has her own radio show that features guest artists chatting and performing with her on each hour-long program. Her guests have included Jon Hendricks, Warren Vache, Harry Allen, Gene Bertoncini, Joel Frahm and Marlene VerPlanck.

Her most popular CDs include The Whole Truth, Reflections, Wingin' It, A Beautiful Friendship and Class Act.
