= Gilbert O'Sullivan discography =

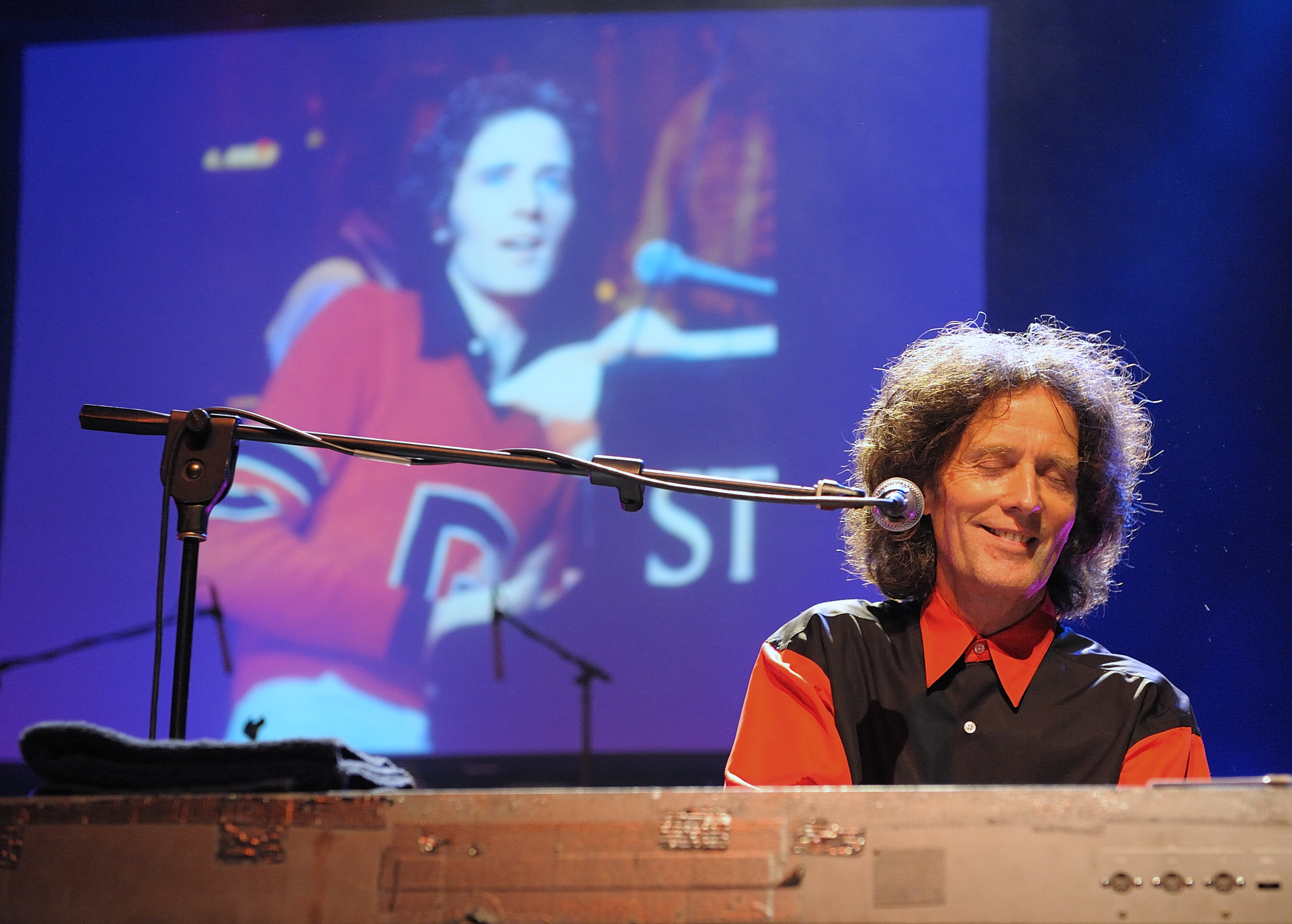
- Gilbert O'Sullivan in 2009.
- Studio albums: 20
- Extended plays: 3
- Compilation albums: 15
- Singles: 47

The following is a discography listing of Gilbert O'Sullivan's officially released works to date.

== Albums ==
List of studio albums, with selected details and chart positions
Title	Album details	Chart positions						
Title	Album details	US	UK	SCO	NLD	NOR	AUS	AUT
Himself	Released: August 1971; Formats: LP, CS, 8-track	9	5		3	1	17	7
Back to Front	Released: 1972; Formats: LP, CS, 8-track	48	1		2	1	22	—
I'm a Writer, Not a Fighter	Released: September 1973; Formats: LP, CS, 8-track	101	2		8	15	22	—
A Stranger in My Own Back Yard	Released: October 1974; Formats: LP, CS, 8-track	—	9		—	—	—	—
Southpaw	Released: November 1977; Formats: LP, CS,	—	—		—	—	—	—
Off Centre	Released: October 1980; Formats: LP	—	—		—	—	98	—
Life & Rhymes	Released: October 1982; Formats: LP	—	—		—	—	—	—
Frobisher Drive	Released: 1987; Formats: LP, CD	—	—		—	—	—	—
In the Key of G (updated / edited version of Frobisher Drive)	Released: November 1989; Formats:	—	—		—	—	—	—
Sounds of the Loop	Released: November 1991; Formats:	—	—		—	—	—	—
By Larry (also known as The Little Album)	Released: April 1994; Formats:	—	—	—	—	—	—	—
Every Song Has Its Play	Released: May 1995; Formats:	—	—	—	—	—	—	—
Singer Sowing Machine	Released: November 1997; Formats:	—	—	—	—	—	—	—
Irlish	Released: October 2000; Formats:	—	—	—	—	—	—	—
Piano Foreplay	Released: 2003; Formats:	—	—	—	—	—	—	—
A Scruff at Heart	Released: March 2007; Formats:	—	—	—	—	—	—	—
Gilbertville	Released: 31 January 2011; Formats:	—	—	—	—	—	—	—
Latin ala G!	Released: 8 June 2015; Formats:	—	—	—	—	—	—	—
Gilbert O'Sullivan	Released: 24 August 2018; Formats: CS	—	20	11	—	—	—	—
Driven	Released: 22 July 2022; Formats: Blu-ray, CD, vinyl	—	26	8	—	—	—	—
Songbook	Released: 27 September 2024; Formats: CD, vinyl	—	—	56	—	—	—	—

=== Compilation albums ===
List of compilation albums, with selected details and chart positions
Title	Album details	Chart positions			
Title	Album details	UK	SCO	AUS	NOR
Greatest Hits	Released: November 1976; Formats: LP, CS	13		—	—
20 Golden Greats	Released: 1981; Formats: LP	98		—	—
The Very Best of Gilbert O'Sullivan	Released: October 1986; Formats: LP	—		19	—
Nothing But the Best	Released: 1991; Formats: CS	50		—	—
Rare Tracks	Released: April 1992; Formats:	—		—	—
The Best Of Gilbert O'Sullivan: Live in Japan	Released: April 1995; Formats:	—	—	—	—
The Berry Vest of Gilbert O'Sullivan	Released: March 2004; Formats:	20	19	—	32
The Very Best of Gilbert O'Sullivan: A Singer & His Songs	Released: 12 March 2012; Formats: CD, MP3	12	18	—	—

== EPs ==
Release date	Titles
1972	"Alone Again (Naturally)" / "Save It" / "No Matter How I Try" / "If I Don't Get You"
1972	"Clair" / "What Could Be Nicer" / "Ooh-Wakka-Doo-Wakka-Day" / "But I'm Not"
1978	"Christmas Song" / "Clair" / "Nothing Rhymed"

== Singles ==
Release date	A-side	B-side	Chart positions						
Release date	A-side	B-side	UK	AUS	IRE	US	US AC	NLD	NZ
November 1967	"Disappear"	"You"	—	—	—	—	—	—	—
April 1968	"What Can I Do?"	"You"	—	—	—	—	—	—	—
May 1969	"Mr. Moody's Garden"	"I Wish I Could Cry"	—	—	—	—	—	—	—
October 1970	"Nothing Rhymed"	"Everybody Knows"	8	85	2	—	—	1	14
February 1971	"Underneath the Blanket Go"	"Doing the Best I Can"	40	—	—	—	—	1	—
May 1971	"Susan van Heusen"	"I Didn't Know What to Do"	—	—	—	—	—	—	—
June 1971	"I Wish I Could Cry"	"Mr. Moody's Garden"	—	—	—	—	—	20	—
July 1971	"We Will"	"I Didn't Know What to Do"	16	—	—	—	—	23	—
November 1971	"No Matter How I Try"	"If I Don't Get You (Back Again)"	5	—	7	—	—	13	10
February 1972	"Alone Again (Naturally)"	"Save It"	3	2	2	1	1	21	2
May 1972	"Matrimony"	"January Git"	—	—	—	—	—	4	—
May 1972	"Ooh-Wakka-Doo-Wakka-Day"	"But I'm Not"	8	14	1	—	—	12	3
October 1972	"Clair"	"What Could Be Nicer (Mum, the Kettle's Boiling)"	1	12	1	2	1	4	2
January 1973	"Out of the Question"	"Everybody Knows"	—	—	—	17	2	—	—
March 1973	"Get Down"	"A Very Extraordinary Sort of Girl"	1	6	1	7	3	3	7
August 1973	"Ooh, Baby"	"Good Company"	18	31	2	25	29	18	—
November 1973	"Why, Oh Why, Oh Why"	"You Don't Have to Tell Me"	6	50	3	—	—	—	15
February 1974	"Happiness Is Me and You"	"Breakfast, Dinner, and Tea"	19	65	4	62	23	—	—
August 1974	"A Woman's Place"	"Too Bad"	42	—	—	—	—	—	—
November 1974	"Christmas Song"	"To Cut a Long Story Short"	12	—	5	—	—	—	—
January 1975	"You Are You"	"Tell Me Why"	53 (Note: Chart position is from the official UK "Breakers List".)	—	—	—	17	—	—
May 1975	"I Don't Love You But I Think I Like You"	"That's a Fact"	14	95	7	—	—	—	—
August 1975	"I'll Believe It When I See It"	"Just as You Are"	52	100	16	—	—	11	—
October 1975	"You Never Listen to Reason"	"Call on Me"	—	—	—	—	—	—	—
April 1976	"Doing What I Know"	"I, of Course, Replied"	—	—	—	—	—	—	—
October 1976	"To Each His Own"	"Can't Get You out of My Mind"	—	—	10	—	—	—	—
November 1976	"Matrimony"	"You Don't Have to Tell Me"	—	—	26	—	—	—	—
May 1977	"My Love and I"	"Call on Me"	—	—	—	—	—	—	—
July 1977	"You Got Me Going"	"As Long as I Can"	—	—	—	—	—	—	—
February 1978	"Miss My Love Today"	"Our Own Baby"	—	—	—	—	—	—	—
August 1980	"What's in a Kiss?"	"Down, Down, Down"	19	27	4	—	13	—	—
November 1980	"I Love It But"	"Help Is on the Way"	—	—	—	—	—	—	—
January 1981	"Hello, It's Goodbye"	"Break It to Me Gently"	—	—	—	—	—	—	—
March 1981	"Can't Get Enough of You"	"Or So They Say"	—	—	—	—	—	—	—
April 1981	"Why Pretend"	"Help Is on the Way"	—	98	—	—	—	—	—
June 1982	"A Minute of Your Time"	"In Other Words"	—	—	—	—	—	—	—
September 1982	"Bear with Me"	"Don't Bother at All"	—	—	—	—	—	—	—
1989	"Lost a Friend"	"You Better Run"	—	—	—	—	—	—	—
February 1990	"So What"	"In a Nutshell"	70	—	—	—	—	—	—
June 1990	"At the Very Mention of Your Name"	"What You See Is What You Get"	—	—	—	—	—	—	—
October 1991	"What A Way (To Show I Love You)"	"Lost A Friend"	—	—	—	—	—	—	—
May 1992	"Tomorrow, Today"	"What's In A Kiss"	—	—	—	—	—	—	—
1992	"Can't Think Straight" †	"Sometimes" / "Divorce Irish Style"	—	—	—	—	—	—	—
August 1993	"Anytime"	"Alone Again (naturally)"	—	—	—	—	—	—	—
November 1993	"Are You Happy?"	"Nothing Rhymed" (live) / "Or So They Say" (live)	—	—	—	—	—	—	—
November 1995	"Dear Dream"	"Dear Dream" (dance mix) / "Sometimes"	—	—	—	—	—	—	—
October 1998	"Ain't No Telling (What Tomorrow Will Bring)"	"Doesn't It Make You Sick" / "Break a Leg"	—	—	—	—	—	—	—
May 2001	"Taking A Chance On Love"	"Clair" / "Happiness Is Me And You"	—	—	—	—	—	—	—
July 2001	"Say Goodbye"	"Sex Appeal" / "Clair"	—	—	—	—	—	—	—
June 2002	"Two's Company (Three Is Allowed)"	"I Have a Coat to Keep Me Warm" / "There Are Others"	—	—	—	—	—	—	—
December 2002	"Ooh, Baby"	"Ooh, Baby" (versions)	—	—	—	—	—	—	—
June 2007	"Just So You Know"		—	—	—	—	—	—	—
July 2008	"Never Say Di"		—	—	—	—	—	—	—
March 2013	"Me Mum"		—	—	—	—	—	—	—
June 2015	"Made in Love"		—	—	—	—	—	—	—
February 2016	"No Way"		—	—	—	—	—	—	—

† Duet with Peggy Lee
