= A Stranger in My Own Back Yard =

Studio album by Gilbert O'Sullivan
- Released: October 1974
- Recorded: Sunset Sound Factory, Los Angeles and A & R Recording, New York
- Genre: Pop
- Length: 41:49 (62:03 with bonus tracks)
- Label: MAM
- Producer: Gordon Mills

Gilbert O'Sullivan chronology
I'm a Writer, Not a Fighter (1973)	A Stranger in My Own Back Yard (1974)	Southpaw (1977)

Singles from A Stranger in My Own Back Yard
- 1. "A Woman's Place" Released: August 1974

A Stranger in My Own Back Yard is the fourth studio album by Irish singer-songwriter Gilbert O'Sullivan, originally released in October 1974 by MAM Records. Peaking at number 9 on the UK Albums Chart, it was O'Sullivan's fourth and, to date, final top ten album, although it received positive reviews from critics. After the funk-inflected I'm a Writer, Not a Fighter, A Stranger in My Own Back Yard marked a return to the style of O'Sullivan's first two albums. The album's only single, "A Woman's Place", was O'Sullivan's first since his breakthrough to miss the top 40 of the UK Singles Chart. Union Square Music reissued the album on the Salvo label in 2012 as part of the Gilbert O'Sullivan - A Singer & His Songs collection.

== Background ==
Gilbert O'Sullivan spent much of the early 1970s as one of the world's most successful singer-songwriters. With a style often marked by his distinctive, percussive piano playing style and observational lyrics using word play, O'Sullivan scored a string of major international hits between 1970 and 1973 including "Alone Again (Naturally)", which topped the Billboard Hot 100 for six non-consecutive weeks in 1972 and UK chart-toppers "Clair" and "Get Down". He was awarded three Ivor Novello Awards in this period, including for "Songwriter of the Year" in 1973.

1973 yielded O'Sullivan's final major US hit in "Ooh Baby". "Happiness Is Me and You", a non-album single released in February 1974, was a relative commercial flop compared to O'Sullivan's previous singles. It reached number 18 on the UK Singles Chart and failed to reach the US top 40. Gilbert composed his next album, his fourth, in Portugal in early 1974. He stayed in a small fishing village there for two months.

== Songs ==
As with Gilbert O'Sullivan's previous albums, A Stranger in My Own Back Yard was produced by Gordon Mills and arranged by Johnnie Spence. The album was O'Sullivan's first not to be recorded at London's Audio International Studios. Sessions instead took place in two American studios: New York's A & R Recording, where recordings were engineered by Phil Ramone, and at Los Angeles's Sunset Sound Factory, engineered by John Haeny. O'Sullivan would not make another album produced by Gordon Mills. After the release of A Stranger in My Own Back Yard, O'Sullivan discovered his recording contract with MAM Records greatly favoured Mills, and a lawsuit followed. Eventually, in May 1982, the court found in O'Sullivan's favour, describing him as a "patently honest and decent man", who had not received a just proportion of the vast income his songs had generated. They awarded him £7 million in damages (£31,000,000 as of 2023).

The album begins with "Number Four", a short introductory piece that follows the mould of similar pieces on O'Sullivan's first two albums, Himself and Back to Front. This is followed by "A Woman's Place", an upbeat song which was released as a single in advance of the album on 10 August 1974. Musically, the song was compared to O'Sullivan's number-one hit "Get Down", but the lyric ("I believe / A woman's place is in the home") proved unpopular and was seen by some as sexist. The song received little airplay. O'Sullivan would comment, "I thought it was a nice sounding title, but it has rebounded on me something terrible. Even my mother, a stay-home housewife, with six children, objects to my ideas. Surely the idea of keeping a woman at home and cherishing her is a compliment to her!" "A Woman's Place" was O'Sullivan's first single since his 1970 breakthrough to miss the top 40 of the UK Singles Chart, reaching a peak of number 42 on 7 September.

"No More" was included on a demo tape O'Sullivan recorded which circulated around the music industry prior to his signing to MAM Records. Singer and songwriter Tony Hazzard owned this recording on an acetate at one time, describing it as "great just with the piano in his shed. Clever songwriting".

The tracks "My Father", "I Wonder Would You Mind" and "Always Somebody" are minimal productions. They feature just O'Sullivan accompanying himself on the piano, aside from a horn solo on "My Father". This reflected O'Sullivan's original desire for his 1971 debut album Himself, which had ultimately featured full instrumentation. O'Sullivan had commented, "Gordon says work up to it gradually so probably by the time of my third album it will be done like that."

== Release and reception ==
Professional ratings
Review scores
Source	Rating
AllMusic	3/5 stars

A Stranger in My Own Back Yard was released by MAM Records in October 1974. Printed advertisements for the album declared "A few albums stand out from the rest. This is one of them". The album was packaged in a lavish custom gatefold, mimicking a hardbound book. This design was credited to David Larkham And Friends and Glenn Ross. Larkham had been art director for Elton John's Goodbye Yellow Brick Road album in 1973. The cover photograph, showing a chest-baring O'Sullivan, was taken by British photographer Terry O'Neill. American music photographer Ed Caraeff shot the in-studio photographs of O'Sullivan featured inside the gatefold.

Spending eight weeks in the top 40 of the UK Albums Chart, A Stranger in My Own Back Yard peaked at number 9 on 2 November 1974, becoming O'Sullivan's first album to miss the top five. The album was swiftly followed by the release of the non-album single "Christmas Song" in November 1974, which reached a peak position of number 12 on the UK Singles Chart on 4 January 1975. A Stranger in My Own Back Yard was O'Sullivan's final top ten album, and he didn't chart with another studio album until 2018's Gilbert O'Sullivan charted at 20.

Upon its release, Billboard called A Stranger in My Own Back Yard "another set of well done, catchy melodies and words by one of the more talented young singer/songwriters to surface in the last few years", and noted that the album features "some strong rockers" alongside O'Sullivan's trademark ballads. In a retrospective review, AllMusic's J. Scott McClintock considered the album "the patchiest of O'Sullivan's early albums". McClintock found "A Woman's Place" to be "shockingly chauvinistic" and considered "The Thing Is" and "15 Times" to be "slap-dash efforts". However, McClintock praised "It's So Easy to Be Sad" and "My Father", comparing O'Sullivan's "witty and well-crafted" songs to those of Harry Nilsson.

== Track listing ==
All songs written by Gilbert O'Sullivan.

1. "Number Four" - 1:25
2. "A Woman's Place" - 3:17
3. "No More" - 2:26
4. "It's So Easy to Be Sad" - 4:42
5. "My Father" - 2:43
6. "The Marriage Machine" - 3:28
7. "If You Ever" - 2:33
8. "The Thing Is" - 4:01
9. "Just Like Me" - 3:04
10. "Victor E" - 2:46
11. "I Wonder Would You Mind" - 2:19
12. "15 Times" - 2:21
13. "Nothing to Do About Much" - 3:27
14. "Can't Get You to Love Me" - 2:25
15. "Always Somebody" - 0:53

=== Bonus tracks on the 2012 remaster ===
16. "Happiness Is Me and You" (single, February 1974) - 3:11
17. "Breakfast Dinner and Tea" (B-side of "Happiness Is Me and You") - 2:07
18. "Too Bad" (B-side of "A Woman's Place", August 1974) - 3:13
19. "To Cut a Long Story Short" (B-side of "Christmas Song", November 1974) - 2:46
20. "You Are You" (single, January 1975) - 3:20
21. "Tell Me Why" (B-side of "You Are You") - 2:58
22. "That's a Fact" (B-side of "I Don't Love You But I Think I Like You", May 1975) - 2:39

== Personnel ==
- Gilbert O'Sullivan - vocals, piano

Technical

- Gordon Mills - producer
- Phil Ramone - engineer
- John Haeny - engineer
- Johnnie Spence - arranger
- Terry O'Neill - photography
