= The Berry Vest of Gilbert O'Sullivan =

Compilation album by Gilbert O'Sullivan
- Released: 2004
- Genre: Soft rock, pop
- Length: 71:26
- Label: EMI

Gilbert O'Sullivan chronology
Piano Foreplay (2003)	The Berry Vest of Gilbert O'Sullivan (2004)	A Scruff at Heart (2006)

The Berry Vest of Gilbert O'Sullivan is a compilation album by the Irish singer-songwriter Gilbert O'Sullivan, released in 2004. The songs are composed and performed by Gilbert O'Sullivan.

== Track listing ==
1. "Nothing Rhymed" – 3:24
2. "Alone Again (Naturally)" – 3:38
3. "Clair" – 3:02
4. "Get Down" – 2:42
5. "We Will [Gus Dudgeon Re-Mix]" – 3:55
6. "No Matter How I Try" – 3:01
7. "Matrimony" – 3:14
8. "Out of the Question" – 2:58
9. "Ooh-Wakka-Doo-Wakka-Day" – 2:47
10. "Why Oh Why Oh Why" – 3:50
11. "Who Was It?" – 2:29
12. "Ooh Baby [Radio Mix]" – 3:24
13. "Miss My Love Today" – 3:49
14. "What's in a Kiss" – 2:37
15. "So What" – 4:16
16. "Can't Think Straight" – 4:03 with Peggy Lee
17. "Doesn't It Make You Sick (Mortar and Brick)" – 3:25
18. "Happiness Is Me and You" – 3:07
19. "Two's Company (Three Is Allowed)" – 3:40
20. "What's It All Supposed to Mean" – 4:20
21. "Mr. Moody's Garden" – 3:45 (bonus track)
