= Johnny Farnham Sings the Big Hits of '73 Live! =

Live album by John Farnham
- Released: October 1973 (Australia)
- Recorded: 29 September 1973
- Genre: Pop; rock
- Label: EMI Music
- Producer: Peter Dawkins

John Farnham chronology
Hits Magic & Rock 'N Roll (1973)	Johnny Farnham Sings the Big Hits of '73 Live! (1973)	Johnny Farnham Sings Hits from the Movies (1974)

Johnny Farnham Sings the Big Hits of '73 Live! is a live album by Australian singer John Farnham.

== Track listing ==
Side A

1. "I Knew Jesus (Before He Was a Star)" (Neal Hefti, Seymore Styne)
2. "Where Is the Love?" (McDonald, Salter)
3. "Baby, Don't Get Hooked on Me" (Mac Davis)
4. "My Love (Paul, Linda McCartney)
5. "Gilbert O'Sullivan Medley" ("Clair"/"Doo Wakka Doo Wakka Day"/"Alone Again (Naturally)")

Side B

1. "You Are the Sunshine of My Life" (Stevie Wonder)
2. "Nothing Rhymed" (R. O'Sullivan)
3. "Tie a Yellow Ribbon Around the Old Oak Tree" (Irwin Levine, L. Russell Brown)
4. "The Morning After" (A. Kasha, J. Hirschorn)
5. "And I Love You So" (Don McLean)
6. "Free Electric Band" (Albert Hammond, Mike Hazlewood)

== Charts ==
Chart (1973)	Peak position
Australian Kent Music Report Albums Chart	45
