= I'm a Writer, Not a Fighter =

Studio album by Gilbert O'Sullivan
- Released: September 1973
- Recorded: Early 1973
- Studios: Audio International Studios, London
- Genres: Pop; rock; easy listening
- Length: 32:18
- Label: MAM
- Producer: Gordon Mills

Gilbert O'Sullivan chronology
Back to Front (1972)	I'm a Writer, Not a Fighter (1973)	A Stranger In My Own Back Yard (1974)

Singles from I'm a Writer, Not a Fighter
- 1. "Get Down" Released: 9 March 1973; 2. "Ooh Baby" Released: August 1973

I'm a Writer, Not a Fighter is the third studio album by Irish singer-songwriter Gilbert O'Sullivan, originally released by MAM Records in September 1973. After becoming one of the most successful performers worldwide in 1972, O'Sullivan pursued new directions with the album, taking influence from rock music and funk and incorporating an array of then-new electric keyboards, as well as emphasizing a new, more rhythmic focus. The album was recorded "on and off" with producer Gordon Mills at the latter's studio, and although several overdubs were recorded in the United States, O'Sullivan referred to the album as an ultimately "very ad hoc home-based" project.

Released months ahead of the album, "Get Down" was a number one single in the United Kingdom and also reached the top ten in the United States. In the ensuing months, O'Sullivan toured internationally for the first time. The release of the album in September coincided with a new rock-influenced image for the singer. The funk-influenced single "Ooh Baby" failed to make the UK top 10 and marked the start of the singer's decline in popularity, while the album itself reached number 2 on the UK Albums Chart, and although it spent 25 weeks on the chart, this was less than its predecessors. Critics are divided on the album's merits, but the response has been generally favourable over time. The Salvo record label released a remastered version of it in April 2012 as part of the Gilbert O'Sullivan – A Singer & His Songs collection.

== Background and recording ==
Gilbert O'Sullivan became one of 1972's most successful musicians and, for a time, the biggest-selling British-based musician worldwide, owing to the success of his second album Back to Front and internationally successful singles such as "Alone Again (Naturally)" and "Clair". To support the album, O'Sullivan toured the United Kingdom for the first time, beginning in late 1972 and continuing into 1973. It was with these performances that he debuted his college-style sweaters with a "G" symbol. Critics applauded the shows, while female audiences turned O'Sullivan into a heartthrob, a position he felt uninterested in. Many of the songs on I'm a Writer, Not a Fighter were written by O'Sullivan in his Weybridge home. Between tours of the UK, O'Sullivan spent time in Spain, where he installed a piano and wrote further songs for the album. He had avoided touring worldwide until later that year because he felt the busy schedule would have made the album difficult to write, and the Britain-only touring ensured that the trip to Spain was possible.

The recording of I'm a Writer, Not a Fighter departed from O'Sullivan's previous two albums, as instead of recording within several three hour sessions in various studios, O'Sullivan and his manager and producer Gordon Mills recorded the album "on and off" in early 1973 at Mills' recently built studio located beside his home, spending a total of several days in the studio. Mills would play keyboards and add backing vocals to tracks, while a rhythm section was also in place and Johnnie Spence returned to provide string arrangements. Although several overdubs were recorded in the United States, O'Sullivan ultimately referred to the album as "a very ad hoc home-based project," which he felt gave the resulting album a "continuity running through it, unlike perhaps the previous two albums." In August 1973, around the time of the album's completion, O'Sullivan moved house as he felt "too vulnerable."

== Composition ==
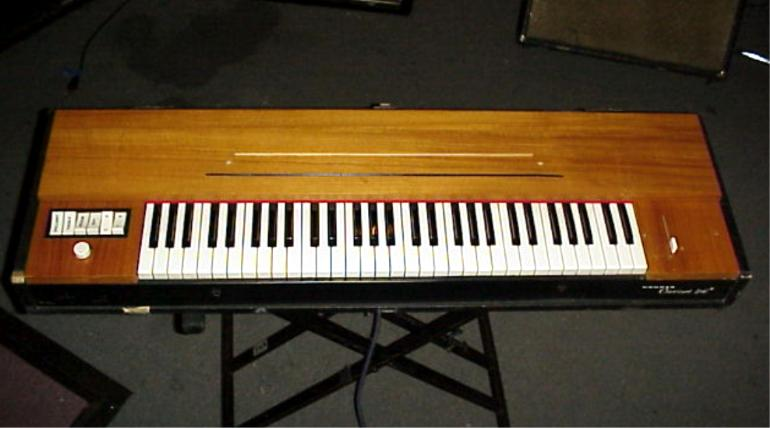
The album reflects the emergence of electric keyboards (clavinet pictured).

I'm a Writer, Not a Fighter was influenced by rock music, and updates O'Sullivan's sound by incorporating a selection of electronic keyboards played by himself and Mills, reflecting the emergence of such instruments at the time, although the album also features the singer's signature acoustic piano playing. O'Sullivan explained: "It was the early days of synths and clavinets, these instruments were emerging, much to any keyboard players' pleasure led in no small part by Stevie Wonder, so me and Gordon had some of these and just played around with them." Contemporary keyboard trends reflected on the album include the use of the electric piano and at one point a sound resembling a pipe organ. The album also features more ambitious rhythms, with an emphasis on percussion and incorporation of instruments like the bongoes, maracas and tambourine, while O'Sullivan's singing is more robust than on previous albums, the result of his voice improving over his live performances.

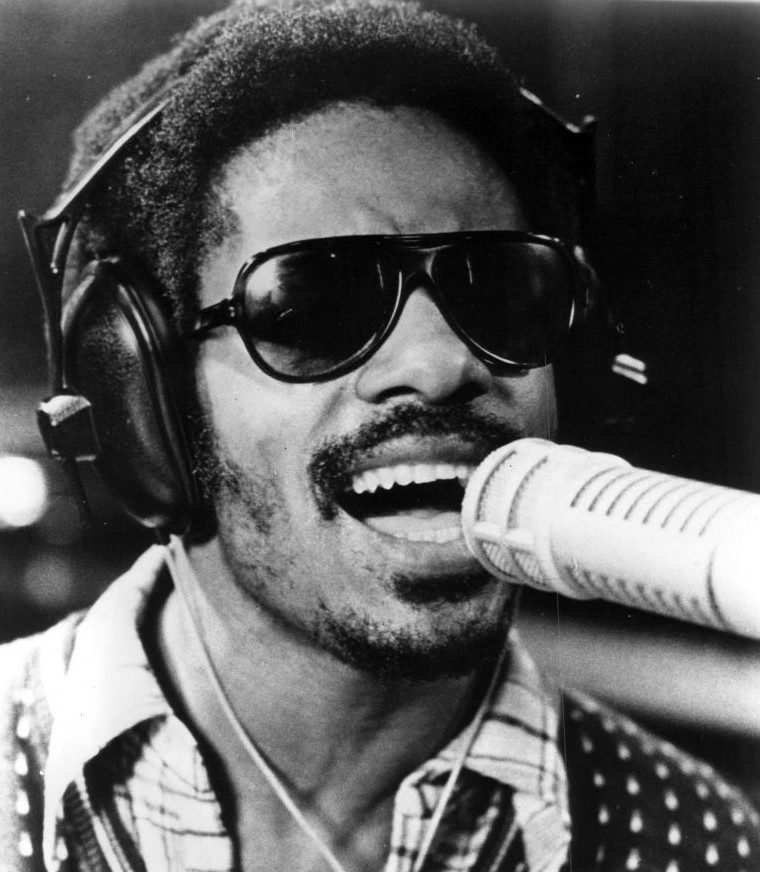
Stevie Wonder, one of the album's influences, in 1973

The album breaks with an O'Sullivan tradition by not featuring a short, meta intro song, instead opening with the album's title track, which fuses blues and soul music, and features funk-styled guitar, reflecting the influence of Stevie Wonder. In the opinion of Tony Stewart, the following song "A Friend of Mine" returns O'Sullivan to the "gossipy writing" of Himself. The song's eccentric narrative plots the singer greeting women and offering them advice and his friendship. "They've Only Themselves to Blame" is one of several ballads on the album, detailing a couple thwarting their young son's attempt to romance, while "Who Knows, Perhaps, Maybe" features a bluesy electric piano and a four on the floor bass drum, again highlighting the album's Stevie Wonder influence. Side one closer "Where the Peaceful Water Flows" is another ballad which alternates between 3/4 and 4/4 time, and features a gospel-style ending.

Similarly to the title track, "Ooh Baby" features a funk-inflected sound, and is defined by a muscular rhythm and diminished chords, while "I Have Never Loved You As Much As I Love You Today" sees the singer assume the position of a serviceman stationed abroad writing home to his partner. "Not in a Million Years" is one of the album's experiments with different rhythms, fusing reggae with rhumba, and has been described as a "left-field musical gem" with harmonic and melodic surprises. "If You Love Me Like You Love Me" is loosely based on the theme of Dusty Springfield's hit "I Only Want to Be with You", while the hit single "Get Down" is built on a chugging pop rock groove and features chiming piano hits during the chorus. O'Sullivan explained the song's lyrics to Paul Gambaccini of Rolling Stone:

"I didn't know what 'get down' means in America, nor 'dog' for that matter, until Gordon came back from the States and told me. My lyrics are very British, and to me the girl in 'Get Down' is behaving like a dog - she's jumping up on him, so 'get down!' That's all. [...] If 'Get Down' really is interpreted as Gordon thought it might, we should sell ten million and put it on the soundtrack of Deep Throat. The whole point of it is to be a good disco record, just a nice rhyme, a simple story. I used to play it was a warm-up on the piano, then I heard the Faces' 'Cindy Incidentally' and that made me think of extending it into a song."

== Promotion and release ==
Over half a year before the album's release, "Get Down" was released as a single by MAM Records; in March 1973, it became O'Sullivan's second and final number one hit on the UK Singles Chart, while also reaching number 7 on the US Billboard Hot 100. O'Sullivan's profile was high throughout 1973, aided not just by record sales but also by tours and television appearances. It was also the first year he toured internationally, picking up his concert schedule again in late spring; after touring the UK and Europe in May and the first half of June, he played several shows in Ireland. He fainted at the end of the final show, and rested for a while in Rhodesia, before touring the United States over six weeks, backed by a 22-piece orchestra. He made his New York City debut at the Avery Fisher Hall in early October, where he played some of the songs from the upcoming album to positive audience reception.

"I’m going to present rock music, really tough rock that nobody ever would expect me to. I need some time to get over this pop sensation.."

— Gilbert O'Sullivan, June 1973

O'Sullivan announced in June that, after the completion of the American tour, he would change his image to coincide with the album's rock influences, reinventing himself to play "really tough rock". He was inspired by Robert Plant of Led Zeppelin and Ian Gillan of Deep Purple, who he felt could "hold a wild show flogging themselves as much as their fans whereas I always had to sit at the piano well-behaved." His stylistic change included wearing "fashionable suits" instead of "coloured sweaters." To launch the promotion of I'm a Writer, Not a Fighter, the label released the single "Ooh Baby", a song which fitted into the "funk-flected" trend of the era that also included T. Rex's "Teenage Dream" (1974) and Elton John's "Bennie and the Jets" (1974). The song alienated O'Sullivan's fan base, and in September, it became the singer's first single to miss the top ten of the UK Singles Chart since his first top ten hit two years earlier, instead peaking at number 18. It also reached number 25 on the US Billboard Hot 100. O'Sullivan and Mills also convinced Muhammad Ali to partake in photoshoots to promote the album featuring O'Sullivan and Ali at his training camp in Dear Lake, Pennsylvania, where the two also sparred recreationally.

I'm a Writer, Not a Fighter was released by MAM Records in September 1973. Although peaking at number 2 on the UK Albums Chart, this was a relative disappointment compared to Back to Front, and by the time the album left the top 10 in February 1974, the singer appeared to have become "a spent force", according to writer Bob Stanley, and his success began to decline. The album ultimately spent 25 weeks on the chart. In the United States, the album peaked at number 101 on the Billboard Top LPs and Tape chart, and spent only ten weeks on the chart, becoming his last charting album. In April 2012, the Union Square Music reissue label Salvo released a remastered version of I'm a Writer, Not a Fighter as part of their Gilbert O'Sullivan – A Singer & His Songs series. This edition features numerous bonus tracks; the album's B-sides "A Very Extraordinary Sort of Girl" and "Good Company", alongside the non-album single "Why, Oh Why, Oh Why" and its B-side "You Don't Have to Tell Me."

== Critical reception and legacy ==
Professional ratings
Review scores
Source	Rating
AllMusic	3/5 stars
Encyclopedia of Popular Music	3/5 stars

In a contemporary review, Tony Stewart of the NME, who did not enjoy Back to Front, felt that I'm a Writer, Not a Fighter re-established O'Sullivan, "in my eyes, as a writer-performer." He panned the two singles, but felt there was "little to criticise" elsewhere, praising the "well expressed" subject matters and lyrical substance, O'Sullivan's "originality in composing" and the instrumentation and arrangement, among other things. He concluded that "O'Sullivan has got back in part, if not wholly to some serious music." The pop reviewer for the Reading Evening Post hailed the album as "another beauty" from O'Sullivan that proved he "goes from strength from strength," hailing the "clever and amusing" lyrics for continuing to bring a "down-to-earth" image to "humdrum, everyday incidents." By contrast, a reviewer for the Buckinghamshire Examiner felt the album was "firmly cast" in the mould of derivative easy listening pop, with "the ever-present syncopated piano and bass-line" failing to distinguish individual songs. However, they praised O'Sulluvan's lyrics, which they felt were defined by "the threading of colloquialisms through a mesh of home-spun philosophy." Bravo described the album as a collection of "hot rock songs."

In a 1974 article on O'Sullivan, The Story of Pop magazine felt that the album was more sophisticated than O'Sullivan's previous albums, plotting him moving "gradually away from the fairly slushy efforts" that had defined Himself in 1971. Sue James of Record Mirror listed it among her favourite albums of 1973. Among retrospective reviews, Sharon Mawer of AllMusic also criticised "Ooh Baby," which she felt lacked "any sort of melody and lyrical ingenuity," and also felt the Stevie Wonder-influenced tracks were poor because "O'Sullivan did not have Wonder's voice, and this type of song really didn't suit him." She did however praise the record's ballads, and wrote that "Get Down" was the best track on the album, before noting "O'Sullivan would never again hit these heights." Tom Ewing of Freaky Trigger called "Get Down" a "rumbustious thing," praising the "chiming piano hits on the chorus" though deriding the "dog/girl metaphor which Sullivan doesn’t take anywhere." The song has featured on Sean Rowley's Guilty Pleasures compilation series, which aims to play music that has been considered guilty pleasures over time but which he believes should be guilt-free.

== Track listing ==
All songs written by Gilbert O'Sullivan.

=== Side one ===
1. "I'm a Writer, Not a Fighter" – 3:18
2. "A Friend of Mine" – 3:23
3. "They've Only Themselves To Blame" – 2:45
4. "Who Knows, Perhaps Maybe" 3:14
5. "Where Peaceful Waters Flow" – 4:16

=== Side two ===
6. "Ooh Baby" – 3:45
7. "I Have Never Loved You As Much As I Love You Today" – 2:33
8. "Not In a Million Years" – 3:01
9. "If You Love Me Like You Love Me" – 3:18
10. "Get Down" – 2:45

=== Bonus tracks on the 2012 remaster ===
11. "A Very Extraordinary Sort of Girl" (b-side of "Get Down") – 2:20
12. "Good Company" (b-side of "Ooh Baby") – 2:49
13. "Why, Oh Why, Oh Why" (single, November 1973) – 3:53
14. "You Don't Have To Tell Me" (b-side of "Why, Oh Why, Oh Why") – 3:15

== Charts ==
=== Weekly charts ===
Chart (1973–74)	Peak position
Australian Albums (Kent Music Report)	22
Dutch Albums (Album Top 100)	8
German Albums (Offizielle Top 100)	5
Norwegian Albums (VG-lista)	15
Swedish Albums (Kvällstoppen)	1
UK Albums (Official Charts)	2
US Billboard 200	101

=== Year-end charts ===
Chart (1974)	Position
German Albums (Offizielle Top 100)	46

== Personnel ==
- Gilbert O'Sullivan – vocals, piano
- Laurie Holloway – electric piano on "Get Down"
- Johnnie Spence – arrangements
- Peter Rynston – engineer
- Terry O'Neill – photography
