= We Will (song) =

Single by Gilbert O'Sullivan
- B-side: "I Didn't Know What To Do"
- Released: July 1971
- Recorded: 1971 (Audio International Studios, London)
- Genre: Pop
- Length: 3'56"
- Label: MAM
- Songwriter: Gilbert O'Sullivan
- Producer: Gordon Mills

Gilbert O'Sullivan singles chronology
"Underneath the Blanket Go" (1971)	"We Will" (1971)	"No Matter How I Try" (1971)

"We Will" is a song by British-Irish singer-songwriter Gilbert O'Sullivan, released as a single in July 1971. The ballad was O'Sullivan's second top 20 hit, peaking at number 16 on the UK Singles Chart on 4 September 1971. It was included as a bonus track on the 2011 reissue of his debut album Himself.

O'Sullivan has described it as "very much a Catholic working class family song". Upon release, Peter Jones of Record Mirror considered the song "less infectious" than O'Sullivan's first hit "Nothing Rhymed", but described it as "unmistakeably Gilbert, with that mixture of naivety and power." John Peel for Disc and Music Echo considered O'Sullivan's "one of the very few true originals we have" but speculated that he was "somewhat misunderstood and misinterpreted" by the label. Peel opined "this record is a case in point. It's pleasant enough but most of the distinguishing features that make the man seem to have been filtered out. It's a good song too with quaint and arresting lyrics. It could be, of course, that he's very happy with this record but l prefer to think that the rather cloying production was the idea of the producer alone. Gilbert doesn't fit into accepted channels, therein lies his charm, and attempts to squash him into those channels will only destroy him."

Writing in The Guardian in 2011, Bob Stanley considered "We Will" to be "a song of resigned melancholy about how to get through a personal crisis by appreciating things such as kicking a ball, visiting distant relatives, eating corn flakes." The Times writer Pavel Barter wrote in 2017 that the song "introduced a form of kitchen-sink observational drama usually lacking in pop music."

O'Sullivan re-recorded "We Will" for his 1987 album Frobisher Drive. The song was covered by Rumer on her 2012 album Boys Don’t Cry. O'Sullivan has recounted in interviews being phoned up by Andy Williams in the 1970s, who was planning to cover the song and wanted permission to change the line 'I bagsy being in goal' as he did not understand the expression.
