= Strange Nature =

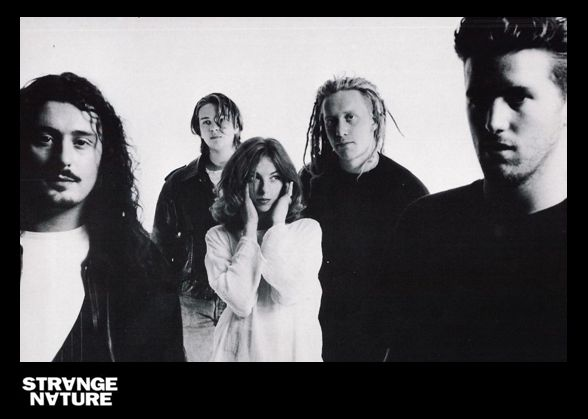
- Strange Nature. (L–R): Rabbetts, Mills, Andrews, Tenniswood, O'Bryan

Background information
- Origin: London, England
- Genre: Indie rock
- Years active: 1986–1995
- Labels: PWL; Warner Music Europe

Strange Nature were an English indie rock band, Formed in London and signed to Pete Waterman's PWL record label in the UK, Warner Music in Europe, and Warner Chappell Music for worldwide publishing.

The band were popular in Europe during 1992 to 1995. Strange Nature recorded one album, World Song, and two singles, "Incantation Man" and "New Messiah". Winning "Best Album" from the Sunday Mirror and receiving airplay from all major European radio stations and MTV, all three releases charted in Europe.

In 1995, Strange Nature split amicably to enable band members to follow successful solo careers and projects, including The Lights, Dub Pistols, and Two Lone Swordsmen.

== History ==
=== Early years (1986–1991) ===
Formed in 1986 by Gordon Mills, son of 60s pop producer and music manager Gordon Mills Snr., and Imogen Andrews, niece to Julie Andrews, the band consisted of five members including Keith Tenniswood, lead guitar, Jason O'Bryan, bass guitar, and Justin Rabbetts, drums.

In 1991, Strange Nature, a coupling taken from two separate lines from a Jimi Hendrix song, recorded a series of demos at Matrix Studios London that gained the attention of East West Records, Warner Brothers.

Hengel's music management company Tantamount Artist Management signed the band in 1991 and by 1992 TAM struck a three-album, 9 single deal with Pete Waterman's PWL label via record former CBS record executive David Howells.

=== PWL and World Song (1992–1994) ===
In 1992, Strange Nature recorded the band's debut album, World Song. The 11-track CD was produced by Steve Brown, notable for his work with Manic Street Preachers, The Cult, and George Michael. It was recorded at Olympic Studios, Town House, and Marcus Studios, all situated in London.

Released in 1993, the album reached top 40 status in Europe and spawned two singles: "Incantation Man" and "New Messiah". A third single "Gone" was never released. Highly acclaimed by the UK and European media, World Song was named "Best Album" by the Sunday Mirror and NME branded the release "a stunning debut album".

Three videos were filmed for the singles by award winning music film director Mike Brady, renowned for his work with The Jam, Irish rockers Ash and Peter Andre. Filming took place at the world famous Shepperton Studios.

Between 1992 and 1994 Strange Nature toured continuously across the UK and Europe as a headline act and also supported Spin Doctors and Thunder, amongst other acts. Strange Nature also performed for the 1992 BBC Children in Need charity evening.

At the end of 1994 Strange Nature and PWL mutually agreed that the band was not signed to a label suited for an indie rock group and the three-year contract was dissolved. The band's third single "Gone" remained unreleased.

=== Final years and disbandment (1994–1995) ===
During 1994 to 1995, Strange Nature remained with Warner Chappell Music following their split with Pete Waterman's label, and they recorded a full two albums' worth of additional material. Despite a contract offer from music manager Bud Prager (Megadeth, Foreigner, Bad Company) in 1995 designed to relocate the band to New York to break the US market, Strange Nature decided to split, following decisions from the various members to move on to various solo projects.

== Members ==
Imogen Andrews continues as an active singer–writer and is now the lead singer with atmospheric guitar act The Lights.

Gordon Mills focuses on writing and music production, and still plays live and in the studio as a drummer & guitarist. Mills' credits include Mohair, Ricky, The Somatics, The Lights, The Dub Pistols, Two Lone Swordsmen, Judie Tzuke, Razorlight, Journey South, The Bluetones, Mark Morriss. Goron Mills has also co-written and produced the album "Falling off my Head" for a new talent called Emma Rohan. In 2006 Mills signed a publishing deal with Relentless/Outcaste and is currently occupied, writing for many artists.

Keith Tenniswood is now better known as one half of the electronic act Two Lone Swordsmen alongside Andrew Weatherall. Outside of the group he is more frequently known as Radioactive Man, and runs the Control Tower electro record label. Tenniswood has also worked with artists such as Beth Orton and David Holmes on his album Let's Get Killed, The Aloof and Red Snapper.

Jason O'Bryan now produces and plays bass guitar for London based dub music and big beat band the Dub Pistols. The band continues to be a successful in both UK and abroad.

Justin Rabbetts recorded with 3 Colours Red before forming Beanjuice, a grunge rock band consisting of singer / writer / actor Russ Wilson, guitarist and lyricist Daz Rice and bass player / producer Dave Needham (David Essex). Rabbetts also toured Europe and UK with UK rock legends The Dogs D'Amour.

== Discography ==
- World Song (1993)

== Trivia ==
Gordon Mills' sister Clair Mills is the famous Clair from the hit 1970s song "Clair" by Gilbert O'Sullivan.

Imogen Andrews is the niece of film legend and singer Julie Andrews, whose credits include The Sound of Music and Mary Poppins.

Sam Brown, famous for her single "Stop!" and work with Pink Floyd, appears as backing vocals on Strange Nature's album track "Innocence".
