= In the Key of G =

Studio album by Gilbert O'Sullivan
- Released: 13 November 1989
- Recorded: Windmill Lane Recording Studios, Dublin; Britannia Row, London; Power Plant, London; Bray Studios and Livingstone Studios, London
- Genres: Soft rock, pop
- Length: 40:26 (60:34 with bonus tracks)
- Label: Dover
- Producers: Gilbert O'Sullivan, Ken Gold, Chris Tsangarides, Gus Dudgeon, Kevin Killen, David Foster, Gordon Mills

Gilbert O'Sullivan chronology
| Frobisher Drive (1987) | In the Key of G (1989) | Sounds of the Loop (1991) |

In the Key of G is the ninth studio album by British-Irish singer-songwriter Gilbert O'Sullivan, released on 13 November 1989. Union Square Music re-released it on 8 April 2013 on the Salvo label as part of the Gilbert O'Sullivan - A Singer and His Songs collection.

== Track listing ==
All songs written by Gilbert O'Sullivan.

1. "Lost a Friend" - 3:06
2. "At the Very Mention of Your Name" - 5:25
3. "What Am I Doing Here with You" - 4:09
4. "If I Start with the Chorus" - 2:39
5. "So What" - 4:18
6. "The Way Things Used to Be" - 4:43
7. "I Don't Trust Men with Earrings in Their Ears" - 4:01
8. "Gordon Bennett" - 4:46
9. "To the Extreme" - 3:40
10. "Stick in the Mud" - 3:39

=== Bonus tracks on the 2013 remaster ===
11. "I Have My Coat to Keep Me Warm" (from the single "Two's Company (Three Is Allowed)") - 3:30
12. "Forever Wondering" (from the album Frobisher Drive) - 3:55
13. "At the Very Mention of Your Name" (single version) - 4:48
14. "In a Nutshell" (B-side of "So What") - 2:52
15. "So What" (instrumental extended mix) - 5:04
