= Back to Front (Gilbert O'Sullivan album) =

Studio album by Gilbert O'Sullivan
- Released: October 1972
- Studios: Audio International Studios, London
- Genres: Pop; orchestral pop; easy listening
- Length: 35:47
- Label: MAM
- Producer: Gordon Mills

Gilbert O'Sullivan chronology
Himself (1971)	Back to Front (1972)	I'm a Writer, Not a Fighter (1973)

Singles from Back to Front
- 1. "Clair" Released: October 1972; 2. "Out of the Question" Released: February 1973

Back to Front is the second studio album by Irish singer-songwriter Gilbert O'Sullivan, released in October 1972 by MAM Records. The album follows the success of his 1971 debut album Himself and singles such as "Alone Again (Naturally)". Coinciding with the album, O'Sullivan abandoned his distinctive dress sense, which included a short cap and trousers, and instead presented himself as a more masculine, hairy-chested singer with a perm, wearing sweaters with the letter "G" emblazoned on them, which helped establish him as a sex symbol. O'Sullivan wrote the album's songs at home during night-time writing sessions, and recorded the album with his manager and producer Gordon Mills in London.

As with Himself, the album combines show tune-inspired pop music with string arrangements, but also places an emphasis on piano-based songs. O'Sullivan's lyrical style displays his characteristic observational, kitchen sink style, with songs boasting humorous twists and a wide range of musical and lyrical influences, including Fats Domino. Upon release, Back to Front was a critical and commercial success, reaching number 1 on the UK Albums Chart and allowing O'Sullivan to become the era's best-selling British-based artist. The single "Clair" was a UK chart-topper. To promote the album, the singer underwent his first nationwide tour. Salvo released a remastered version of Back to Front in February 2012 as part of their Gilbert O'Sullivan – A Singer & His Songs collection.

== Background ==
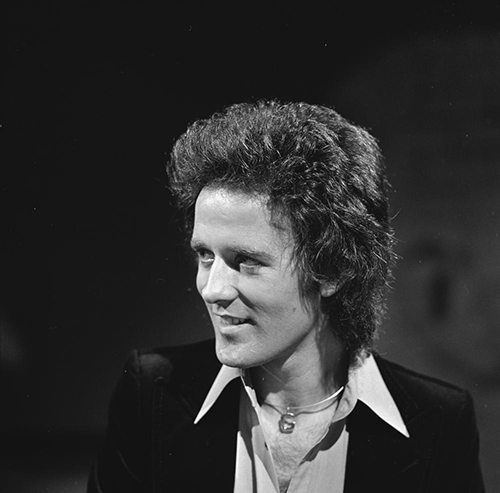
O'Sullivan in 1974, sporting the hairstyle he introduced in 1972.

In 1971, after struggling to achieve success for several years, Gilbert O'Sullivan signed to the newly emergent MAM Records and achieved critical and commercial success in the United Kingdom with his debut album Himself and its top 10 hit "Nothing Rhymed." The album was musically dominated by piano and orchestral arrangements, while O'Sullivan's lyrics were observational in style, and were described as bearing a "satirical view of life." The singer's signature image at the time was inspired by 1930s film stars like Buster Keaton and Charlie Chaplin, and featured "pudding basin" hair, a large cloth cap, a grey school shirt with a twisted collar and short trousers, prompting comparisons to, among many reference points, the Bisto Kids.

The 1972 song "Alone Again (Naturally)" reached the UK top 3 early in the year, and became a number one hit in the United States when released there that May. This coincided with O'Sullivan changing his visual presentation, as he began to wear standard-length trousers and big T-shirts with "G" emblazoned on them, having been inspired by American college sweaters. This was a deliberate attempt to prevent "[making] an impact like Tiny Tim" in the US that "would have taken years to shake off," and the subsequent American edition of Himself, which included "Alone Again (Naturally)", featured an updated image of O'Sullivan on the album artwork. The singer became known as "the scream machine" for having broken through the British and American markets with a large female fan base.

The success O'Sullivan enjoyed allowed him to reside in a bungalow on his producer Gordon Mills's estate for the development of Back to Front, and the singer became characterised by journalists who observed him in the estate throughout 1972 as a pipe-smoking artefact collector. By the end of the year, O'Sullivan's new image had grown to incorporate a perm hairstyle and was often photographed with a hairy chest, thus curating a "he-man" image similar to his labelmates Tom Jones and Engelbert Humperdinck. The image makeover is depicted on the album artwork of Back to Front, and according to critic Oregano Rathbone: "There's so much testosterone gushing from the sleeve of Back To Front that, like the Durutti Column records with the sandpaper sleeve, it utterly destroys any albums stored next to it."

== Writing and recording ==
"I'd be writing, practising, trying to come up with melodies, buying records, listening to music, having a great time musically. Walk up to Gordon's house for dinner offered to me by Jo, his wife, do a bit of babysitting, help out around the house, walk back home. Life was really good for me."

— Gilbert O'Sullivan

O'Sullivan began writing songs for Back to Front by sitting at the piano without specific ideas, instead "[doing] a few Fats Dominoes and just [having] a good time. The melodies just come out while I'm playing around." The singer would spend days in his bungalow writing songs and melodies for the album and practising them, before spending the rest of the day helping Mills with non-musical activities such as babysitting. He would compose songs for the album from late at night until around 5 am, and was unwilling to adjust his creative habits to accommodate personal relationships. Although he felt happy to date girls on the back of his success, he did not want it to interfere with his songwriting, so he "used to drop girlfriends like a stone." During the period, O'Sullivan enjoyed keeping aware of modern music, and would purchase "just about every album that is released," including releases by Carole King, Sly & the Family Stone, Neil Young and Carly Simon, all of whom he enjoyed but described as having no "real bearing" on his direction.

As with Himself, the recording for Back to Front took place in three-hour sessions with a rhythm section, an arranger (Johnnie Spence) and Mills as producer, the latter of whom he "trusted" though would occasionally disagree with. The sessions took place at London's Audio International Studios, also with the help of engineer Peter Rynston. In a May 1972 interview with the NME, O'Sullivan explained: "I've got all the songs. They're not finished, but they are there. Gordon has heard all the melodies. I just have to write the lyrics. We have actually started recording and it's going great."

Mills decided to double-track most of O'Sullivan's vocals on the album, just as he had on the 1971 single "No Matter How Hard I Try". O'Sullivan reflected that: "The interesting thing about double-tracking is, the less mature your voice, the better it sounds. The better your voice gets, the less it works. So at this point, I wasn't too mad about all the double-tracking on Back to Front." Johnnie Spence returns from Himself to provide arrangements throughout the album, though Frank Barbara arranged the song "That's Love" when Spence was unavailable.

== Composition ==
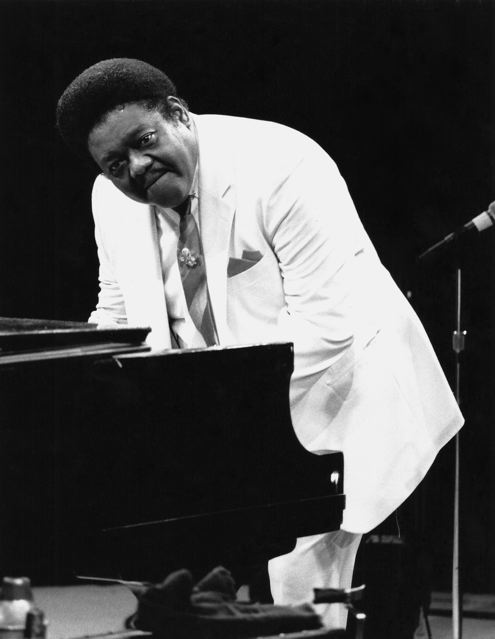
Fats Domino was an influence on several songs on Back to Front.

In an interview prior to the release, O'Sullivan explained that, as with its predecessor, Back to Front is "just [...] a collection of songs." Similarly to his previous work, the album contains orchestral pop melodies and "quizzical, idiosyncratically-phrased lyrics," though the record also contains more piano-based songs than before. In the opinion of AllMusic's Stephen Thomas Erlewine, the album retains the show tune-inspired pop of its predecessor, but is glossier and slicker, with greater care taken to write "sprightly theatric tunes, songs that take great pride in their clever-clever twists, smiling, crowd-pleasing melodies, and [songs which contain] proudly cheeky sentimentality." In an interview during the album's recording, O'Sullivan described his lyrics as an observational, "uneducated look at things," and said he would often base songs on situations he read in newspapers because "they are current. They move on every day."

Similarly to Himself, the album is bookended by short intro and outro songs. The intro track invites listeners to "join the hunt," and seamlessly segues into "I Hope You Stay", which concerns romance and unemployment, which is then followed by "In My Hole," an orchestral pop song with a Johnnie Spence-scored trumpet part reminiscent of Hugh Masekela's 1968 jazz hit "Grazing in the Grass" and lyrics concerning an introverted 'hermit' who refuses to engage with the world around him. "Clair", meanwhile, concerns O'Sullivan's babysitting of Mills' daughter Clair, and finds the singer in his "distracted interior monologue" mode. He wrote the song to Clair's parents as "almost a thank you to them." "That's Love" is a characteristically off-kilter love song with a doo-wop turnaround chord sequence, while "Can I Go with You" is a tribute to the early work of the Beatles, exuding a youthful idealism, themes of young romance and the "chiming romanticism" style of Paul McCartney. These songs are followed by "But I'm Not," which features a twelve-bar blues structure in the style of Fats Domino, who O'Sullivan was introduced to by Rick Davies, O'Sullivan's former Rick's Blues bandmate and later a member of Supertramp. The song is suffixed by an "outro" to side one.

Side two opens with the bluesy shuffle of "I'm in Love with You," featuring the distinctive slide guitar of Big Jim Sullivan. It is followed by the darkly humorous "Who Was It?", with its narrator "tripping a girl up in order to meet her," and "What Could Be Nicer", which is one of O'Sullivan's 'family songs' with "very English" kitchen sink lyrics that wistfully detail domestic scenarios with "home-spun philosophy," according to writer Chris Ingham. "Out of the Question" concerns a lover's mood swings, while "The Golden Rule" is one of O'Sullivan's most musically inventive and lyrically offbeat songs, with its "assonant convolution and linguistic legerdemain." As with "But I'm Not", Fats Domino influenced the song "I'm Leaving", which opens with an octave synthesiser and features lyrics of urban claustrophobia that O'Sullivan has described as perhaps chronicling his childhood town Swindon failing to achieve city status. The album's outro song follows, where O'Sullivan bids listeners farewell.

== Release and promotion ==
During the recording of the album, the non-album single "Ooh-Wakka-Doo-Wakka-Day" was released in June 1972, reaching number 8 on the UK Singles Chart, and becoming the first of three chart-topping hits for O'Sullivan on the Irish Singles Chart. In October 1972, the same month as the album's release, the album's first official single "Clair" was released, becoming O'Sullivan's first No. 1 single in the United Kingdom, where it stayed at the summit for two weeks and lasted on the chart for fourteen weeks. The single also reached number 2 on the US Billboard Hot 100, and number 1 in Canada, as well as at number 1 on the US Easy Listening chart. "Out of the Question" was also released as a single in North America in February 1973, where it reached number 17 on the US Billboard Hot 100 and number 9 in Canada.

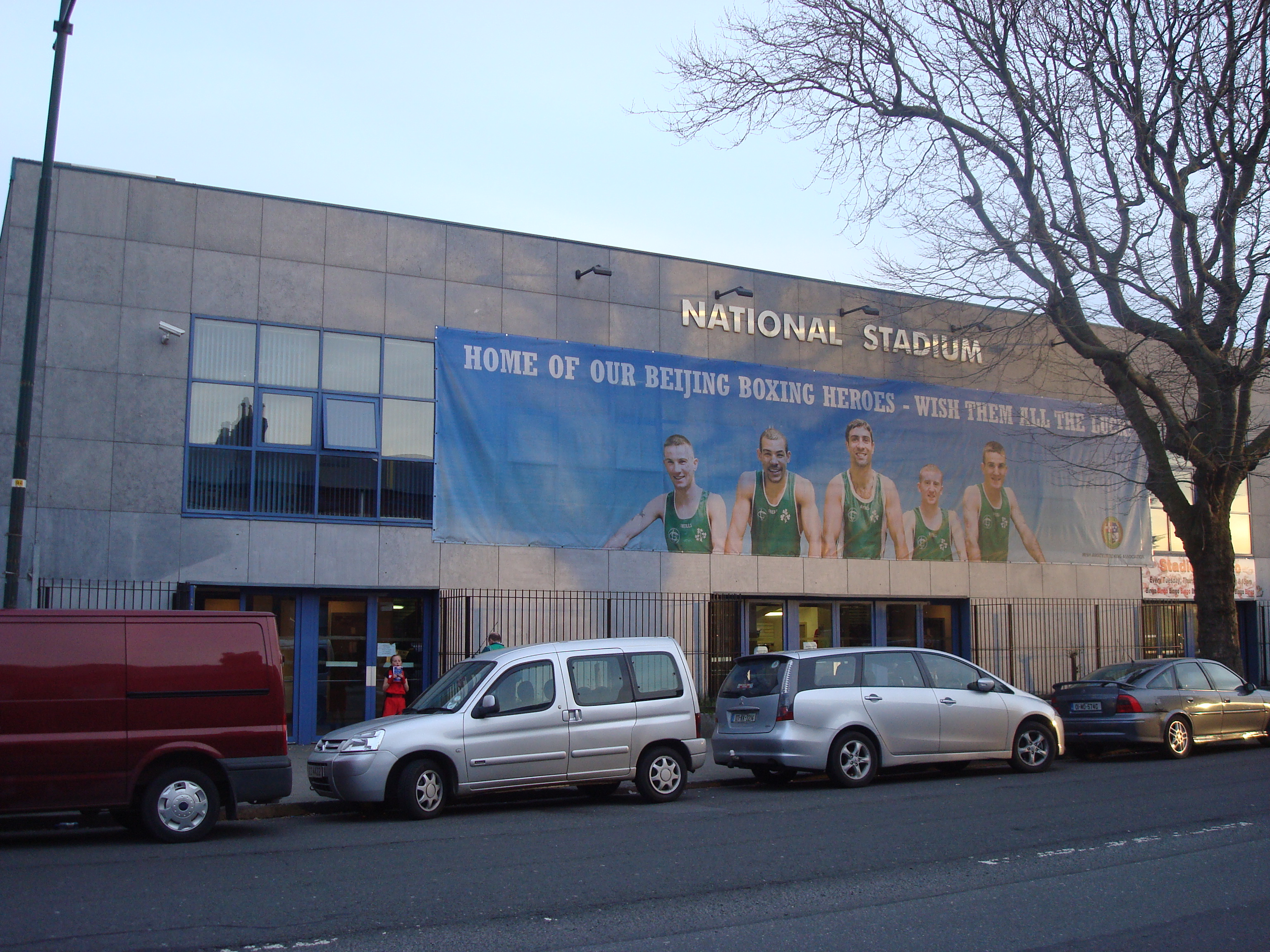
The National Stadium in O'Sullvan's native Ireland, where he made his concert debut in late 1972.

Back to Front was released by MAM Records in October 1972 and became O'Sullivan's biggest-selling album. It spent 64 weeks on the UK Albums Chart, debuting at No. 2 and ultimately peaking at No. 1 during its ninth week of charting in January 1973. It was less successful in the United States, where it peaked at No. 48 on the Billboard Top LPs and Tape chart in March 1973, but it nonetheless did spend a total 19 weeks on the chart. O'Sullivan ultimately became the year's biggest-selling British-based artist worldwide, rivalling Elton John as Britain's most successful singer-songwriter export overseas and embracing both teenage and adult audiences internationally.

To accompany the album's late 1972 release, O'Sullivan toured for the first time, something he had avoided before because his priority was songwriting. The concerts, which began at the National Stadium, Ireland, on 31 October 1972, were critically acclaimed, with one NME writer noting O'Sullivan exuded "much more confidence than you'd expect from a guy who's only doing his second gig," referring to his November 1972 show at the Hammersmith Odeon. Another NME described a later show as "superb ... a slick, polished performance." His audience also greatly received the shows, in particular his female fanbase; O'Sullivan characterised the early 1970s "youthful admiration" he received as similar to that afforded to Slade, Marc Bolan, the Osmonds and David Cassidy, and called it "a lighter side to the serious one of writing songs."

On 21 February 2012, a remastered version of the album was released by Salvo (a reissue label owned by Union Square Music) as part of their Gilbert O'Sullivan – A Singer & His Songs series. This version contains extensive sleeve notes and adds three bonus tracks; the non-album singles "Alone Again (Naturally)" and "Ooh-Wakka-Doo-Wakka-Day," along with the former song's B-side "Save It".

== Critical reception and legacy ==
Professional ratings
Review scores
Source	Rating
AllMusic	3.5/5 stars
Christgau's Record Guide	B+
Encyclopedia of Popular Music	4/5 stars
Record Collector	5/5 stars

Writing for Creem, Robert Christgau wrote that O'Sullivan "certainly hasn't turned into a major annoyance yet," in reference to his earlier review of Himself where he speculated O'Sullivan "may turn into a major annoyance." He concluded that Back to Front is "the best more-or-less easy-listening record" since Helen Reddy's eponymous 1971 album, and rated the album a "B+" score, indicating "a good record, at least one of whose sides can be played with lasting interest and the other of which includes at least one enjoyable cut." O'Sullivan topped off his year of success by being ranked by Record Mirror as the number 1 male singer of 1972, and in May 1973, he won an Ivor Novello award for "British Songwriter of the Year."

Among retrospective reviews, Stephen Thomas Erlewine of AllMusic felt the album amply and charmingly displayed O'Sullivan's "song-and-dance-man" skills for "a snappy hook or tearjerking melody," and felt that, in many ways, the album's "unabashed showbiz cheer" trumps "the bedsit introspection of Himself." He also felt the album's "gloss" would "not have seemed out of place on a televised variety show from 1972." Oregano Rathbone of Record Collector gave the 2012 reissue a perfect score, writing that "Back To Front is rammed with diffident, bashful, playful greatness," and concluded that "[r]esistance is futile." Colin Larkin rated the album four stars out of five in The Virgin Encyclopedia of Popular Music.

"Clair", the album's best known song, is frequently highlighted in reviews, Rathbone for instance who described it as possessing a "could-the-world-ever-have-been-like- this innocence," though noting that, "as O’Sullivan ponders in the sleevenotes, probably couldn't be written in a century as cynical and suspicious as this one." Tom Ewing of Freaky Trigger dismissed the song as "one of those cutesy love songs to small children that the British charts used to turn up regularly," though wrote that the song "improves when it drops the is-it-a-romantic-song conceit and just talks about the delightful hassles of babysitting." The subject of the song, Clair Mills, attended O'Sullivan's performance at the Royal Albert Hall in 2010. Record producer Norman Smith, working under the alias Hurricane Smith, had a minor hit with his own version of "Who Was It?" in 1972, reaching number 23 in the UK Singles Chart.

== Track listing ==
All songs written by Gilbert O'Sullivan

Side one
No.	Title	Length
1.	"Intro"	0:21
2.	"I Hope You'll Stay"	2:28
3.	"In My Hole"	2:46
4.	"Clair"	3:00
5.	"That's Love"	3:02
6.	"Can I Go With You"	2:46
7.	"But I'm Not/Outro"	2:34

Side two
No.	Title	Length
8.	"I'm in Love with You"	4:25
9.	"Who Was It?"	2:31
10.	"What Could Be Nicer (Mum, the Kettle's Boiling)"	3:06
11.	"Out of the Question"	3:01
12.	"The Golden Rule"	2:37
13.	"I'm Leaving"	2:34
14.	"Outro"	0:33

Bonus tracks on the 2012 remaster
No.	Title	Length
15.	"Alone Again (Naturally)"	3:41
16.	"Save It" (B-side of "Alone Again (Naturally)")	2:46
17.	"Ooh-Wakka-Doo-Wakka-Day"	2:49

== Personnel ==
- Gilbert O'Sullivan – vocals, piano, vocals, whistling
- Chris Spedding – guitars
- Herbie Flowers – bass
- Gordon Mills – production, harmonica in "Clair"
- Frank Barber – arrangements, drums
- Johnnie Spence – arrangements
- Peter Rynston – engineering

== Charts ==
=== Weekly charts ===
Chart (1972–73)	Peak position
Australian Albums (Kent Music Report)	22
Dutch Albums (Album Top 100)	2
German Albums (Offizielle Top 100)	2
Norwegian Albums (VG-lista)	1
Swedish Albums (Kvällstoppen)	1
UK Albums Chart	1

=== Year-end charts ===
Chart (1973)	Position
German Albums (Offizielle Top 100)	3
