= Out of the Question =

Out of the Question may refer to:

- "Out of the Question" (Gilbert O'Sullivan song), 1973
- "Out of the Question" (Mumm-Ra song), 2007
- Out of the Question (game show), an Australian chat and game show
