= Southpaw (album) =

Studio album by Gilbert O'Sullivan
- Released: November 1977
- Genre: Pop
- Length: 36:03 (67:25 with bonus tracks)
- Label: MAM
- Producer: Gilbert O'Sullivan

Gilbert O'Sullivan chronology
A Stranger In My Own Back Yard (1974)	Southpaw (1977)	Off Centre (1980)

Southpaw is the fifth studio album by Irish singer-songwriter Gilbert O'Sullivan, originally released in November 1977. This was the first album produced by Gilbert O'Sullivan. Union Square Music re-released it in June 2012 on Salvo label in part of the Gilbert O'Sullivan - A Singer & His Songs collection.

This was the first of O'Sullivan's albums not to contain a UK top 40 single. However, "I'll Believe It When I See It" and "To Each His Own" (not included on the original album) did chart in the Irish top 20.

== Critical reception ==
The Globe and Mail wrote: "O'Sullivan is still writing his cloying little songs that start infectiously and end infectiously. In between is zero, or less than."

== Track listing ==
All songs written by Gilbert O'Sullivan.

1. "Intro" - 0:46
2. "You Got Me Going" - 2:40
3. "No Telling Why" - 3:36
4. "Tomorrow Today" - 3:12
5. "The Best Fun I Ever Had" - 3:33
6. "I Remember Once" - 5:15
7. "Intro 2" - 0:23
8. "I Of Course Replied" - 2:42
9. "That's Where I Belong" - 3:33
10. "My Love And I" - 3:22
11. "If I Can't Have You All To Myself" - 3:04
12. "Miss My Love Today" - 3:56

=== Bonus tracks on the 2012 remaster ===
13. "I'll Believe It When I See It" (single, August 1975) - 5:20
14. "Just As You Are" (b-side of "I'll Believe It When I See It") - 2:38
15. "You Never Listen To Reason" (single, October 1975) - 3:20
16. "Call On Me" (b-side of "You Never Listen To Reason") - 3:14
17. "Doing What I Know" (single, August 1976) - 4:45
18. "To Each His Own" (single, October 1976) - 3:08
19. "Can't Get You Out Of My Mind" (b-side of "To Each His Own") - 3:24
20. "As Long As I Can" (b-side of "You Got Me Going", July 1977) - 2:21
21. "Our Own Baby" (b-side of "Miss My Love Today", February 1978) - 3:10

== Personnel ==
- Gilbert O'Sullivan - vocals, piano

Additional personnel

- Chris Spedding - guitars
- Lee Fothergill - guitars
- Ritchie Cunningham - guitars
- Colin Green - guitars
- Alan Jones - bass
- Barry De Souza - drums
- Pete Kircher - drums
- Terry Cox - drums
- Tony Hymas - keyboards, Moog
- Robert Hook - keyboards, Moog
- Frank Ricotti - percussion
- Francisco Yglesias - Paraguayan Harp
- The Mike Sammes Singers, The Chanter Sisters - backing vocals
- Johnnie Spence - arranger, conductor

Technical

- John Haeny, Phil Ramone - engineers
