= Himself (Gilbert O'Sullivan album) =

Studio album by Gilbert O'Sullivan
- Released: August 1971
- Studio: Audio International Studios, London
- Genre: Pop
- Length: 43:02
- Label: MAM
- Producer: Gordon Mills

Gilbert O'Sullivan chronology
Himself (1971)	Back to Front (1972)

Singles from Himself
- 1. "Nothing Rhymed" Released: October 1970

Himself is the debut album by Irish singer-songwriter Gilbert O'Sullivan, released in the United Kingdom by MAM Records in August 1971, following the top 10 success of its single "Nothing Rhymed". O'Sullivan originally intended the album to feature only his voice and piano playing, until his manager and the album's producer Gordon Mills persuaded him to use full instrumentation and arrangements by Johnnie Spence. Mills also aided O'Sullivan with his songwriting, which incorporates an observational style and word play, the usage of the latter being influenced by Spike Milligan.

Upon release, Himself was a commercial success in the UK, reaching number 5 on the UK Albums Chart. It received a warm reception from critics, and O'Sullivan became noted for his satirical lyrics and eye-catching, atypical dress style, which included a cloth cap and short trousers. The album was released with a revised track list in the United States in 1972, this time boasting the hit single "Alone Again (Naturally)". It reached number 9 on the US Billboard Top LPs & Tape chart. A remastered edition of the original version of Himself was released by the Salvo label in 2011 as part of the Gilbert O'Sullivan - A Singer & His Songs collection.

== Background and recording ==
Born in Waterford, Ireland in 1946, Raymond Edward O'Sullivan began playing the piano after moving to Swindon, England around the age of seven. (Note: Speaking in 2012, O'Sullivan explained "I come from a working class background, but we always had a piano, the thinking of my parents was that if one of your kids could play it, you could make some money at it.") A period of going to piano lessons was short-lived, as he was not enamoured with music theory and preferred to play pieces by ear. O'Sullivan began writing songs as a teenager, inspired by the Beatles and identifying with their ability "to write music without being able to read it, just through their love of it". By 1967, O'Sullivan had left Swindon for London, determined to get a record deal. Looking to stand out, he created an unorthodox image comprised a pudding basin haircut, cloth cap and short trousers. O'Sullivan has said his love of silent film inspired the look. After coming to the attention of manager Stephen Shane, O’Sullivan attained a five-year contract with April Music, CBS Records' house publishing company, on the strength of demo recordings made in his garden shed. Shane suggested O'Sullivan changed his name from Ray to Gilbert as a play on the name of the operetta composers Gilbert & Sullivan.

CBS issued "Disappear", O'Sullivan's first single in November 1967, credited to the mononym 'Gilbert'. It failed to chart, as did a follow-up, "What Can I Do", released in April 1968. A switch to the Northern Irish record label Major Minor in 1969 yielded a third single, "Mr. Moody's Garden", again unsuccessful. O'Sullivan then sent some demo tapes to Gordon Mills, the manager of Tom Jones and Engelbert Humperdinck, and was signed to Mills' newly-founded label, MAM Records. Mills reportedly hated his image, but O'Sullivan insisted on using it initially. O'Sullivan's debut single on MAM Records, "Nothing Rhymed", was released in October 1970. It became the label's second major success when it peaked at number 8 on the UK Singles Chart on 19 December 1970, after "I Hear You Knocking" by Dave Edmunds had topped the chart that month. "Nothing Rhymed" was followed in February 1971 by the uptempo "Underneath The Blanket Go", which stalled at number 40.

Gordon Mills produced Himself, which was recorded at Audio International Studios in London with sessions beginning in November 1970. With engineer Peter Rynston, recording sessions would last three hours and would also feature arranger Johnnie Spence. Gilbert O'Sullivan's original intention was to record the album with just piano and voice, but Mills persuaded him to use full instrumentation and string arrangements. In a 1971 interview, O'Sullivan elaborated: "Gordon says work up to it gradually so probably by the time of my third album it will be done like that. If I'd done it with piano and voice it wouldn't have been successful. It's a question of what fits the songs and I think the backings are appropriate." Mills had a strong influence even on the structure of the songs, as O'Sullivan would write "three middle eights and three times as many verses" and Mills would pick out which lyrics he found best. O'Sullivan considered it "an awful lot of fun" to have alternatives to play around with.

== Composition ==
=== Musical and lyrical style ===
"Five years ago, when it was Beatlemania and all the rest of it, you'd never be able to make an album with all your own songs. In those days, if it didn't have that hook chorus and it wasn't going to be a Top Ten hit, forget it. Now people get the opportunity to do their own albums and that's a very good thing."

—Gilbert O'Sullivan

Musically, Himself is characterised by O'Sullivan's piano and Spence's arrangements, while guitar also appears courtesy of Chris Spedding. Several styles are explored on the album; songs such as "January Git" and "Matrimony" feature what one writer refers to as a "true dancehall- tradition," while "Thunder and Lightning" and "Houdini Said" feature a piano-driven rock and roll style. Several songs on the album also feature a distinct, percussive piano pattern that Gilbert would use on many on his songs over his career. These include "Independent Air", "Susan Van Heusen" and "Doing The Best I Can". He has attributed this style to the influence of percussion, having drummed in a band called Rick's Blues during his time at Swindon College of Art, explaining: "My left hand is hitting the high hat and the right hand is the snare."

The album's lyrics are often observational and conversational. O'Sullivan has commented: "I reflect the way people talk, and even though I'm Irish, I'm a very English songwriter in the way I observe things." Melody Maker’s Michael Watts observed that "if his lyrics don't exactly flow it's because they are true to the invariable inelegance of language," while Stephen Thomas Erlewine described the album's lyrics as "bedsit introspection." Word play is another common feature in the songs, something O'Sullivan has attributed to the influence of Spike Milligan. Examples of word play in the album's lyrics include "Have yourself A-tomic bomb" in "January Git" and "Bonaparte shandy" substituting for "Napoléon brandy" in "Nothing Rhymed".

=== Songs ===
The album begins with a short intro in which O'Sullivan introduces "this, my first LP debut." This is followed by "January Git", which features a show tune-style horn arrangement by Johnnie Spence. "Permissive Twit" was recorded solo in a spare half-hour at the end of a recording session. It tells the story of "our Linda" and her unwanted pregnancy with the baby of the titular twit ("She thinks his name was Ronald or was it Sid or Len"). Her family, trying to uphold working class respectability, are mortified about the neighbours knowing but are resigned to letting nature take its course. Watts singled out "Permissive Twit" as "the best song Gilbert has written so far." "Matrimony", concerning a couple getting wed at the registrar's, garnered much airplay. It saw a belated single release in November 1976 but failed to chart. Despite this lack of chart success, it has become one of O'Sullivan's most famous songs. "Independent Air" was one of two songs recorded in the first session for the album, the other being "Nothing Rhymed".

Side one ends with "Nothing Rhymed", the album's hit single. It spent four weeks at number 8 at the end of 1970 and the beginning of 1971. O'Sullivan has often attributed its success to its unique quality: "It was not a common-sounding song though people liked it, the feeling was that it could make it, or it might not." He has said seeing footage of starving children in Africa on television for the first time prompted him to write the song. Renowned session bassist Herbie Flowers features on the recording. Pop historian Paul Gambaccini described it as "one of the great songs of all time" in the 2007 BBC documentary Kings of 70s Romance. In 2012, Paul Weller named "Nothing Rhymed" and "Alone Again (Naturally)" as "two of my favourite songs, great lyrics, great tunes."

"Too Much Attention" is a "dismissal of a culture that leads to negative figures attracting notice beyond their import, sung from the point of view of one of them". O'Sullivan named it as among his favourite songs he had written in a 1972 interview. "Thunder and Lightning", one of the album's most uptempo numbers, often opens O'Sullivan's live sets. "Houdini Said" is one of the album's most ambitious pieces. In the lyrics, O'Sullivan wonders why so many young people take part in riots where "all men in blue are the targets to destroy". Melody Maker's Michael Watts has written that song reflects "working class bewilderment" at the "negativity of the middle-class young". The song has become a fan-favourite, and has been included in O'Sullivan's concert setlists. "Doing The Best I Can", written from the perspective of an impoverished father, has been described by O'Sullivan as a "Beatle-influenced, McCartney-esque track". The album ends with an outro, identical to the intro but this time with lyrics thanking listeners who have bought the album.

== Release and promotion ==
O'Sullivan sporting his 'Depression-era street urchin' look in 1971

During the promotion for Himself, O'Sullivan's unique signature look garnered much attention, and often saw him compared to the Bisto Kids. Biographer Jason Ankeny attributes much of O'Sullivan's early success to his unusual image. O'Sullivan explained his thinking behind his appearance in a 1971 interview: "My mother probably doesn't like Neil Young because she hates the way he looks, his hair and everything. If you can get them interested in the way you look then they tend to like the music. The thing which I'm trying to create is of the thirties; Keaton and Chaplin." The vintage aesthetic is accentuated further by the album's sleeve, designed by Don Bax. The gatefold features a collage showing O'Sullivan at a wheel of an elongated Hispano Suiza with Charlie Chaplin, Jackie Coogan and Clara Bow among the passengers.

Himself was released by MAM Records in the United Kingdom in August 1971. It entered the UK Albums Chart at number 44 on 25 September, and climbed steadily, reaching a peak position of number 5 in March 1972. It remained in the top 50 for most of 1972 and 1973, ultimately making its last appearance in February 1974 after spending 82 non-consecutive weeks on the chart. O'Sullivan opted not to tour in promotion of the album. He did however make a number of appearances on British television during 1971, including The Marty Feldman Comedy Machine. He performed "If I Don't Get You (Back Again)", "Susan Van Heusen", "January Git", "Nothing Rhymed", "Permissive Twit" and "Bye-Bye" from the album, as well as his 1969 single "Mr. Moody's Garden" and "We Will", in an edition of BBC In Concert broadcast 18 December 1971.

A revised version of Himself was released in the United States in 1972, adding the non-album singles "Alone Again (Naturally)" and "We Will" and omitting "Susan Van Heusen" and "Doing the Best I Can". This version featured a new sleeve, showing O'Sullivan in his second, more conventional signature look. In August 1972, it entered the Billboard Top LPs and Tape chart at number 107, and peaked at number 9 on 30 September 1972, ultimately spending 29 weeks on the chart. "Alone Again (Naturally)" went on to sell 500,000 copies in the US and was certified Gold. A remastered version of Himself was released by the Salvo label in November 2011 as part of an extensive reissue programme titled Gilbert O'Sullivan - A Singer & His Songs. This edition uses the original British track list and adds 8 bonus tracks, in addition to a 20-page booklet featuring new sleevenotes, lyrics and rare photos.

== Critical reception ==
Professional ratings
Review scores
Source	Rating
AllMusic	4.5/5 stars
Christgau's Record Guide	B
Encyclopedia of Popular Music	3/5 stars
Record Collector	5/5 stars

Upon its release in the UK, Himself received a warm critical reception. Michael Watts of Melody Maker considered O'Sullivan to be totally unlike his stablemates Tom Jones and Engelbert Humperdinck, adding: "He's got talent, for a start, which reaches beyond their superficialities of glam and glossy presentation." Watts compared O'Sullivan to Paul McCartney but noted he lacked "the cloying sentimentality to which the ex-Beatle has occasionally been prone." He also felt O'Sullivan's "satirical view of life" was similar to that of Randy Newman, and noted a "total feeling of Englishness about his songs and him" that mirrored Newman's "quintessentially American insights." Andrew Tyler of Disc felt that "the songs, like the man, are 100 per cent originals," but was less taken by the production style, adding that "to coat the music he offers with a stale, sticky candy covering is a giant boob". The NME's Tony Norman considered Gilbert's melodies to be "among the strongest you can hear today," and praised his ability to get inside a real situation and "capture the whole mood of the moment in his jumping selection of words."

When the album was released in altered form in the US in 1972, it was met with more mixed reviews. Billboard considered it a "dynamic package," while Robert Christgau, writing for Creem, characterised O'Sullivan as "uneven" but "a complete original." Like Michael Watts, Christgau noted the disparity between O'Sullivan and Jones and Humperdinck. John Mendelsohn of Rolling Stone was more critical, writing that O'Sullivan's singing "wears rather poorly" and commenting: "I doubt anyone could characterize him as a great melodist with a straight face." He also wrote: "The English Randy Newman (which I, for one, somehow suspected he might be) he definitely is not." Following the US success of "Alone Again (Naturally)", the album was reviewed again in Rolling Stone, this time by James Isaacs, who said that although Sullivan "had a proclivity for becoming mired in the overbearing scores and especially in his own verbosity and Gaelic sentimentality," the hit single had "brought a tear to my eye on more than one occasion."

Among retrospective reviews, Allmusic's J. Scott McClintock commented that "Gilbert O'Sullivan could be as good as Ray Davies at painting touching pictures of the ordinary," and considered the album "essential to any lover of Beatles-tinged Brit-pop, and any fan of the mundane made profound." In The Virgin Encyclopedia of Popular Music, writer Colin Larkin called the album "highly accomplished." Reviewing the 2011 reissue, Oregano Rathbone of Record Collector rated the album five stars out of five and compared its melodies to "White Album-era McCartney at the pinnacle of his game" and its lyrics to "Alan Bennett displaying an unmatched daring with scansion." Shindig! reviewer Marco Rossi echoed the McCartney comparison in a glowing review of the reissue, praising O'Sullivan's "singular talent" and declaring the album to contain "so many riches it's a sodding outrage". Himself was one of many albums released in 1971 included in David Hepworth's book 1971 - Never a Dull Moment: Rock's Golden Year. In 2009, Hot Press ranked Himself at number 100 in their list of the "250 Greatest Irish Albums Of All Time."

== Track listing ==
All songs written by Gilbert O'Sullivan.

=== Side one ===
1. "Intro" – 0:24
2. "January Git" – 3:14
3. "Bye-Bye" – 3:22
4. "Permissive Twit" – 4:10
5. "Matrimony" – 3:19
6. "Independent Air" – 5:08
7. "Nothing Rhymed" – 3:27

=== Side two ===
8. "Too Much Attention" – 2:39
9. "Susan Van Heusen" – 2:59
10. "If I Don't Get You (Back Again)" – 2:44
11. "Thunder and Lightning" – 2:59
12. "Houdini Said" – 5:24
13. "Doing the Best I Can" – 2:35
14. "Outro" – 0:38

=== Bonus tracks on the 2011 remaster ===
15. "Disappear" (1967 demo) – 1:40
16. "What Can I Do" (1967 demo) – 1:34
17. "Mr. Moody's Garden" (b-side of "I Wish I Could Cry", August 1971) – 3:04
18. "Everybody Knows" (b-side of "Nothing Rhymed", October 1970) – 2:19
19. "Underneath the Blanket Go" (single, February 1970) – 3:09
20. "We Will" (single, July 1971) – 3:55
21. "I Didn't Know What to Do" (b-side of "We Will") – 1:47
22. "No Matter How I Try" (single, November 1971) – 3:02

=== U.S. LP Version released in 1972 ===
Titled "Gilbert O'Sullivan Himself featuring Alone Again (Naturally)"

Catalog number MAM-4

1. "Intro" - 0:23
2. "January Git" - 3:09
3. "Bye Bye" - 3:18
4. "Permissive Twit" - 4:10
5. "Matrimony" - 3:14
6. "Independent Air" - 4:26
7. "Nothing Rhymed" - 3:21
8. "Too Much Attention" - 2:30
9. "Alone Again (Naturally)" - 3:40
10. "If I Don't Get You (Back Again)" - 2:41
11. "Thunder and Lightning" - 2:47
12. "Houdini Said" - 4:55
13. "We Will" - 3:52
14. "Outro" - 0:33

== Personnel ==
- Gilbert O'Sullivan - vocals, piano
- Chris Spedding - guitar
- Herbie Flowers - bass on "Nothing Rhymed"
- Johnnie Spence - arrangements

Technical

- Peter Rynston - engineer
- Don Bax - cover design

== Charts ==
=== Weekly charts ===
Weekly chart performance for Himself
Chart (1971–1972)	Peak position
Australian Albums (Kent Music Report)	17
Austrian Albums (Ö3 Austria)	7
Dutch Albums (Album Top 100)	3
German Albums (Offizielle Top 100)	23
Norwegian Albums (VG-lista)	1
Swedish Albums (Kvällstoppen)	1
UK Albums (OCC)	5
US Billboard 200	9

=== Year-end charts ===
1971 year-end chart performance for Himself
Chart (1971)	Position
Dutch Albums (Album Top 100)	65

1972 year-end chart performance for Himself
Chart (1972)	Position
Dutch Albums (Album Top 100)	4
German Albums (Offizielle Top 100)	47
