= Out of the Question (Gilbert O'Sullivan song) =

Single by Gilbert O'Sullivan

from the album Back to Front
- B-side: "Everybody Knows"
- Released: February 1973
- Genre: Pop
- Length: 2:57
- Label: MAM
- Songwriter: Gilbert O'Sullivan
- Producer: Gordon Mills

Gilbert O'Sullivan singles chronology
| "Clair" (1972) | "Out of the Question" (1973) | "Get Down" (1973) |

"Out of the Question" is a popular song by Irish singer Gilbert O'Sullivan. It was written by O'Sullivan and produced by Gordon Mills.

The song became a hit in the only two countries it had been released as a single: the U.S. (#17) and Canada (#9). It was a much bigger adult contemporary hit, reaching number two and number one in those nations, respectively.

== Chart performance ==
=== Weekly charts ===
| Chart (1973) | Peak position |
|---|---|
| Canada RPM Top Singles | 9 |
| Canada RPM Adult Contemporary | 1 |
| U.S. Billboard Hot 100 | 17 |
| U.S. Billboard Easy Listening | 2 |
| U.S. Cash Box Top 100 | 22 |

=== Year-end charts ===
| Chart (1973) | Rank |
|---|---|
| Canada | 127 |
