= Johnny Farnham Sings the Shows =

Studio album by Johnny Farnham
- Released: June 1972
- Recorded: 1971/1972
- Genre: Pop
- Label: Axis Records
- Producer: Howard Gable

Johnny Farnham chronology
| Together (1971) | Johnny Farnham Sings the Shows (1972) | Hits Magic & Rock 'N Roll (1973) |

Johnny Farnham Sings the Shows is a studio album by Australian pop singer John Farnham (known then as Johnny Farnham). The album was released in June 1972. The album featured cover songs, that where standards of musical theatre, including Charlie Girl in which Farnham starred.

== Track listing ==
Side A

1. "Charlie Girl" (David Heneker & John Taylor)
2. "With a Little Bit of Luck" (Alan Jay Lerner & Frederick Loewe)
3. "Gonna Build a Mountain" (Leslie Bricusse & Anthony Newley)
4. "I Whistle a Happy Tune" (Rodgers and Hammerstein)
5. "Who Can I Turn To?" (Bricusse & Newley)
6. "Hair" (James Rado, Gerome Ragni & Galt MacDermot)
7. "Day By Day" (Stephen Schwartz)

Side B

1. "My Favourite Occupation" (Heneker & Taylor)
2. "You'll Never Walk Alone" (Rodgers & Hammerstein)
3. "Where Is Love?" (Lionel Bart)
4. "On the Street Where You Live" (Lerner & Loewe)
5. "Consider Yourself" (Bart)
6. "Hello Dolly" (Jerry Herman)
7. "Jubilation T. Cornpone" (Mercer & De Paul)
