= Hits Magic & Rock 'N Roll =

Studio album by Johnny Farnham
- Released: 8 June 1973
- Recorded: 1972−73
- Genre: Pop
- Label: Axis Records
- Producer: Peter Dawkins

Johnny Farnham chronology
Johnny Farnham Sings the Shows (1972)	Hits Magic & Rock 'N Roll (1973)	Johnny Farnham Sings The Big Hits Of '73 Live! (1973)

Hits Magic & Rock 'N Roll is a studio album of cover music and eighth studio album overall by Australian pop singer John Farnham (known then as Johnny Farnham). The album was released in June 1973. Singles include Brian Cadd's "Don't You Know it's Magic".

== Track listing ==
Side A

1. "Everything Is Out of Season"
2. "Nobody's Fool"
3. "It's Up to You"
4. "If You Would Stay"
5. "Sweet Cherry Wine"
6. "Don't You Know It's Magic"

Side B

1. "Rock Me Baby"
2. "Lucille"
3. "Blueberry Hill"
4. "Johnny B Goode"
5. "Diana"
6. "Memphis Tennessee"
