= Life & Rhymes =

Studio album by Gilbert O'Sullivan
- Released: October 1982
- Recorded: Windmill Lane Recording Studios, Dublin, Ireland
- Genre: Pop
- Length: 39:56 (46:55 with bonus tracks)
- Label: CBS
- Producer: Graham Gouldman

Gilbert O'Sullivan chronology
| Off Centre (1980) | Life & Rhymes (1982) | Frobisher Drive (1987) |

Life & Rhymes is the seventh studio album by Irish singer-songwriter Gilbert O'Sullivan, released in October 1982.

The album was produced by Graham Gouldman of 10cc and featured several musicians of various 10cc lineups: Paul Burgess, Vic Emerson and Duncan Mackay. Gouldman relocated to record the album: "Graham came over here to Ireland... We did the album here; Graham's just great! We meet up every now and then, and we got him onstage to play bass for 'Nothing Rhymed' in the United Kingdom. A great bass player, and a great songwriter; all those things he wrote for the Yardbirds were great."

Union Square Music re-released it in August 2012 on the Salvo label as part of the Gilbert O'Sullivan – A Singer & His Songs collection.

== Track listing ==
All songs written by Gilbert O'Sullivan.

1. "Live Now Pay Later" – 3:03
2. "Bear With Me" – 3:22
3. "You Don't Own Me" – 3:38
4. "A Minute of Your Time" – 3:40
5. "Is It a Crime?" – 2:54
6. "Got To Be That Way" – 3:15
7. "Has Been" – 2:51
8. "I Promise Honest" – 3:25
9. "Wonder Why" – 3:15
10. "Looking (A Tale of Two Meanings)" – 3:16
11. "If I Know You" – 4:06
12. "At Least I'm Honest" – 3:09

=== Bonus tracks on the 2012 remaster ===
1. "Don't Bother At All" (b-side of "Bear With Me") – 3:26
2. "In Other Words" (b-side of "A Minute of Your Time") – 3:33

== Personnel ==
- Gilbert O'Sullivan – vocals, piano, electric piano, synth
- Graham Gouldman – all guitars, bass, backing vocals, percussion
- Paul Burgess – drums, percussion
- Vic Emerson – electric piano, synth
- Pete Wingfield – electric piano, synth, melodica
- Tessa Webb – backing vocals
- Bim Sinclair – synth, organ
- Bud Sinclair – percussion
- Duncan Mackay – organ
- Lenny – sax
- Orchestra arranged and conducted by Richard Niles

== Sources ==
- Life & Rhymes, CD booklet, 2012
