= Get Down (Gilbert O'Sullivan song) =

Single by Gilbert O'Sullivan

from the album I'm a Writer, Not a Fighter
- B-side: "A Very Extraordinary Sort of Girl"
- Released: 9 March 1973
- Recorded: 1973
- Genre: Pop rock
- Length: 2:39
- Label: MAM
- Songwriter: Gilbert O'Sullivan
- Producer: Gordon Mills

Gilbert O'Sullivan singles chronology
"Out of the Question" (1973)	"Get Down" (1973)	"Ooh, Baby" (1973)

Official audio
- "Get Down" on YouTube

"Get Down" is a song by Irish singer-songwriter Gilbert O'Sullivan, from his 1973 album I'm a Writer, Not a Fighter. Released as a single, it spent two weeks at the top of the UK Singles Chart in April 1973, was also a number-one hit in Ireland for three weeks and was a top-ten hit in the United States and Canada. The song was originally used by O'Sullivan as a piano warm-up tune, but was eventually extended into a full song and released as a single; O'Sullivan recorded and released the song as a change from his more melancholy pieces. It became a Gold disc.

Believed to be an order from O'Sullivan to his dog ("Get Down!"), the singer is actually referring to a girl in the song behaving as a dog jumping on him, hence the request to "get down".

The distinctive electric piano riff was performed by Laurie Holloway.

In 2006 British dance group Malibu Sneakers recorded a dance version of the song entitled "Get Down Again". In 2008 it was released as a vinyl 12", including a vocal remix by Raul Rincon.

The song was used in the 2013 film The Harry Hill Movie.

According to Rick Finch of KC and the Sunshine Band, the song was the inspiration for the 1975 disco hit "Get Down Tonight".

== Personnel ==
- Gilbert O'Sullivan – vocals, piano
- Laurie Holloway – electric piano
- Johnnie Spence – arrangements

== Chart performance ==
=== Weekly singles charts ===
Chart (1973)	Peak position
Argentina	6
Australia (KMR)	6
Austria (Ö3 Austria Top 40)	3
Belgium (VRT Top 30 Flanders)	2
Canada (RPM) Top Singles	3
Canada (RPM) Adult Contemporary	1
Denmark (Tracklisten)	4
France (SNEP)	8
Ireland (IRMA)	1
Italy (FIMI)	10
Netherlands (Dutch Top 40)	3
New Zealand (Listener)	7
Norway (VG-lista)	4
South Africa (Springbok)	3
Spain (AFYVE)	3
Switzerland (Schweizer Hitparade)	2
UK Singles (Official Charts Company)	1
U.S. (Billboard Hot 100)	7
U.S. (Billboard Easy Listening)	3
U.S. (Cash Box Top 100)	4
West Germany (GfK)	1

=== Year-end charts ===
Chart (1973)	Rank
Australia	34
Canada	67
Netherlands (Dutch Top 40)	38
Switzerland	5
UK	14
U.S. Billboard Hot 100	66
U.S. Cash Box	40

== Maison Ikkoku ==
This song, along with another one of O'Sullivan's songs, "Alone Again (Naturally)", were featured as the opening and ending for episode 24 of the Japanese anime hit Maison Ikkoku. At the time, O'Sullivan was signed to production company Kitty Film's associated record label, Kitty Records, which wanted to use the anime's popularity as a way to promote the singer's career in Japan. According to series director Kazuo Yamazaki, the reason the songs were dropped after only one episode was that they were unpopular with viewers; due to copyright issues, they were not included on the English-language American release of the anime, replaced by the previously used Japanese theme songs. The anime was based upon the popular manga of the same name by Rumiko Takahashi.
