= Ooh-Wakka-Doo-Wakka-Day =

Single by Gilbert O'Sullivan
- B-side: "But I'm Not"
- Released: 1972
- Recorded: 1972
- Genre: Pop
- Length: 2:45
- Label: MAM Records
- Songwriter: Gilbert O'Sullivan
- Producer: Gordon Mills

Gilbert O'Sullivan singles chronology
"Alone Again (Naturally)" (1972)	"Ooh-Wakka-Doo-Wakka-Day" (1972)	"Clair" (1972)

"Ooh-Wakka-Doo-Wakka-Day" is a 1972 song by Gilbert O'Sullivan. The song became a top ten hit in the UK, peaking at #8 on the UK Singles Chart, spending a total of 11 weeks on the chart. It was also the first of three (consecutive) #1s on the Irish Singles Chart for O'Sullivan. The song reached #3 on the New Zealand Listener charts

The song was never released on a studio album, but in 2012 it was added to a remastered version of Back to Front.

In 2013, a single-purpose version of the song which featured 300 people singing a reworded version of the song whilst going about their daily lives was used for an advert for the National Lottery.
