= Off Centre (album) =

Studio album by Gilbert O'Sullivan
- Released: October 1980
- Recorded: Moonlight Studios, Cookham, England
- Genre: Pop
- Length: 46:31 (49:08 with the bonus track)
- Label: CBS
- Producer: Gus Dudgeon

Gilbert O'Sullivan chronology
Southpaw (1977)	Off Centre (1980)	Life & Rhymes (1982)

Off Centre is the sixth studio album by Irish singer-songwriter Gilbert O'Sullivan. It was produced by Gus Dudgeon and originally released in October 1980. Union Square Music re-released it August 2012 on Salvo label in part of the Gilbert O'Sullivan - A Singer & His Songs collection.

The lead single from the album, "What's In a Kiss", was O'Sullivan's first top 20 hit in the UK in over five years, peaking at number 19. The song proved to be his final top 20 single in the UK.

== Track listing ==
All songs written by Gilbert O'Sullivan.

1. "I Love It But" - 3:33
2. "What's In a Kiss" - 2:36
3. "Hello It's Goodbye" - 3:08
4. "Why Pretend" - 3:58
5. "I'm Not Getting Any Younger" - 4:32
6. "Things That Go Bump in the Night" - 4:51
7. "Help Is On the Way" - 3:43
8. "For What It's Worth" - 4:05
9. "The Niceness of It All" - 5:26
10. "Can't Get Enough of You" - 3:27
11. "Break It To Me Gently" - 3:20
12. "Or So They Say" - 3:50

=== Bonus track on the 2012 remaster ===
13. "Down, Down, Down" (b-side of "What's In a Kiss", August 1980) - 2:38

== Charts ==
Chart (1981)	Peak position
Australia (Kent Music Report)	98

== Personnel ==
- Gilbert O'Sullivan - vocals, piano

=== Additional personnel ===
- Phil Curtis - bass
- Chris Laurence - bass on "I'm Not Getting Any Younger"
- Paul Westwood - bass on "Can't Get Enough Of You"
- Steve Holley - drums
- Dave Mattacks - drums on "Can't Get Enough Of You"
- Terry Cox - drums on "What's In a Kiss"
- Martin Jenner - acoustic and lead guitars; steel guitar on "For What It's Worth"
- Tim Renwick - acoustic and lead guitars
- Ray Russell - acoustic guitar on "Can't Get Enough Of You"
- Pete Wingfield - electric piano on "The Niceness Of It All", second piano on "Why Pretend", organ on "Hello It's Goodbye" and synthesizer on "Or So They Say"
- Howie Casey - saxophone on "I'm Not Getting Any Younger" and "Why Pretend"
- Jeff Daley - saxophone on "Help Is On the Way"
- Chris Rea - accordion on "I Love It But"
- Stuart Epps - harmony and backing vocals
- Alan Carvell - harmony and backing vocals on "I'm Not Getting Any Younger"
- English Chorale - choir on "Or So They Say"

== Sources ==
- Off Centre, CD booklet, 2012
