= Nothing Rhymed =

Single by Gilbert O'Sullivan

from the album Himself
- B-side: "Everybody Knows"
- Released: 1970
- Recorded: 1970 (Audio International Studios, London)
- Genre: Soft rock
- Length: 3:27
- Label: MAM
- Songwriter: Gilbert O'Sullivan
- Producer: Gordon Mills

Gilbert O'Sullivan singles chronology
"Mr. Moody's Garden" (1969)	"Nothing Rhymed" (1970)	"Underneath the Blanket Go" (1971)

Official video
- "Nothing Rhymed" (Official HD Video) on YouTube

"Nothing Rhymed" is a song written and recorded by the Irish singer-songwriter Gilbert O'Sullivan. It was released in 1970.

The song was O'Sullivan's first hit single in the UK. It peaked at number 8 in the UK Singles Chart, number 2 in Ireland, and number 1 in the Netherlands. "Nothing Rhymed" subsequently appeared on his 1971 album, Himself.

== Background ==
According to O'Sullivan, he wrote the song after seeing film footage of starving children in Africa (during the Nigerian Civil War) on television for the first time. Later, after being signed by manager Gordon Mills, the song was then recorded and released. Renowned session bassist Herbie Flowers features on the original recording.

Pop historian Paul Gambaccini described it as "one of the great songs of all time" in the 2007 BBC documentary Kings of 70s Romance. In 2012, Paul Weller declared "Nothing Rhymed" and "Alone Again (Naturally)" as "two of my favourite songs, great lyrics, great tunes".

== Charts ==
Chart (1970–71)	Peak position
Belgium (Ultratop 50 Flanders)	3
Belgium (Ultratop 50 Wallonia)	13
Netherlands (Single Top 100)	1
Ireland (IRMA)	2
New Zealand (Listener Chart)	14
UK Singles (OCC)	8
