= Gilbert O'Sullivan =

Irish singer-songwriter (born 1946)

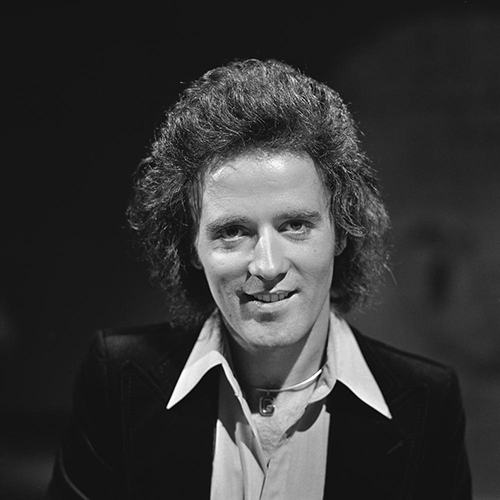
- O'Sullivan on TopPop in 1974

Background information
- Born: Raymond Edward O'Sullivan; 1 December 1946 (age 79); Waterford, Ireland
- Genres: Pop; soft rock; easy listening
- Occupation: Singer-songwriter
- Instruments: Vocals; keyboards
- Works: Gilbert O'Sullivan discography
- Years active: 1967–present
- Labels: Current; Union Square (2007–2010; 2013–present); Former; MAM (1967–1978); CBS (1978–1986); Ultraphone (1986–1988); Dover (1989–1990); Park Records (1991–2000); EMI (2000–2007); Victor (2007); Hypertension (2011–2013)
- Website: gilbertosullivan.co.uk

Raymond Edward O'Sullivan (born 1 December 1946), known professionally as Gilbert O'Sullivan, is an Irish singer-songwriter who achieved his most significant success during the early 1970s with hits including "Alone Again (Naturally)", "Clair" and "Get Down". His songs are often marked by his distinctive percussive piano playing style and observational lyrics using word play.

Born in Waterford, Ireland, O'Sullivan settled in Swindon, England, as a child. In 1967, he began pursuing a career in music. Worldwide, he has charted 16 top 40 records, including six No. 1 songs, the first of which was 1970's "Nothing Rhymed". Across his career, he has recorded 19 studio albums. The music magazine Record Mirror voted O'Sullivan the top UK male singer of 1972. He has received three Ivor Novello Awards, including "Songwriter of the Year" in 1973, and received praise from fellow musicians Nina Simone, Paul Weller, Gary Barlow, and Tim Burgess.

== Early life ==
O'Sullivan was born on 1 December 1946 in Cork Road, Waterford, Ireland. He was one of six children. His mother, May, ran a sweet shop and his father was a butcher with Clover Meats. The O'Sullivans emigrated due to a job offer in England. The family first moved to Battersea, London, when O'Sullivan was seven, before settling in Swindon, Wiltshire, a year later. He began playing piano there, later explaining: "I come from a working-class background, but we always had a piano, the thinking of my parents was that if one of your kids could play it, you could make some money at it." A period of going to piano lessons was short-lived, as O'Sullivan was not enamoured of music theory and played the pieces by ear instead. His father died two years after the move to Swindon. O'Sullivan did not mourn his death, later stating that "the fact of the matter is, I didn't know my father very well, and he wasn't a good father anyway".

O'Sullivan attended St Joseph's Catholic College before studying at Swindon College where he specialized in graphic design and also played with several semi-professional bands. These included the Doodles and the Prefects. He was mostly a drummer in a band called Rick's Blues, along with Malcolm Mabbett (guitar), Keith Ray (bass) and founder Rick Davies. Davies, who later founded Supertramp, taught O'Sullivan how to play both drums and piano. O'Sullivan's drumming informed his style of piano-playing, which often utilizes a distinctive percussive piano pattern. He has explained, "My left hand is hitting the high hat and the right hand is the snare." He started writing songs, heavily influenced by the Beatles, as writers, and Bob Dylan, as a performer.

== Career ==
O'Sullivan sporting his 'Depression-era street urchin' look in 1971

In 1967, O'Sullivan moved from Swindon to London in pursuit of a career in music. Determined to get a record deal and looking to stand out, he created an eye-catching visual image consisting of a bowl cut, cloth cap and short trousers. O'Sullivan said his love of silent film inspired the look. He obtained a five-year contract with April Music, CBS Records' house publishing company, after coming to the attention of the professional manager, Stephen Shane, who also suggested changing his name from Ray to Gilbert as a play on the name of the light opera partnership of Gilbert and Sullivan. He was paid an advance of £12 (equivalent to £191 in 2025), with which he bought a piano. He was signed to CBS Records by the A&R manager Mike Smith, who produced the Tremeloes, the Marmalade and the Love Affair.

O'Sullivan's first single was "Disappear", produced by Smith and released in November 1967, credited to the mononym "Gilbert". It failed to chart, as did his second single, "What Can I Do", released in April 1968. A switch to the Irish record label Major Minor Records, in 1969, yielded a third single, "Mr. Moody's Garden", which was again unsuccessful. O'Sullivan then sent some demo tapes to Gordon Mills, the manager of Tom Jones and Engelbert Humperdinck, whereupon O'Sullivan was signed to Mills' newly founded label, MAM Records. Mills did not agree with O'Sullivan's self-created image, but O'Sullivan initially insisted on using it. O'Sullivan's signature look garnered much attention and often saw him compared to the Bisto Kids. O'Sullivan explained his thinking behind his appearance in a 1971 interview: "My mother probably doesn't like Neil Young because she hates the way he looks, his hair and everything. If you can get them interested in the way you look then they tend to like the music. The thing which I'm trying to create is of the thirties; Keaton and Chaplin."

=== Early success ===
At the end of 1970, O'Sullivan achieved his first UK top 10 hit with "Nothing Rhymed", which also reached number one in the Netherlands, where it earned O'Sullivan his first gold disc. Over 1971, O'Sullivan had hits with "Underneath The Blanket Go" (which also reached number one in the Netherlands), "We Will" and "No Matter How I Try", the latter being named "Best Ballad or Romantic Song" at the 17th Ivor Novello Awards in 1972. O'Sullivan released his debut album, Himself, in August 1971. It received a warm critical reception, with O'Sullivan's observational and conversational style of songwriting garnering comparisons to Paul McCartney and Randy Newman. O'Sullivan opted not to tour in promotion of the album, but did however make a number of appearances on British television during 1971, most notably recording an edition of the BBC's In Concert broadcast on 18 December 1971.

O'Sullivan in 1972

In 1972, O'Sullivan achieved international fame with "Alone Again (Naturally)", a ballad which touches on suicide and loss. The single peaked at no. 3 in the UK but in America spent six non-consecutive weeks at number one on Billboard's Hot 100, selling nearly two million copies. It peaked at no. 2 in New Zealand (during an 11-week chart run); spent two weeks at number one in Canada (13 weeks in the Top 40); and reached number one in Japan (during a 21-week chart run). In America the single ranked no. 2 (behind Roberta Flack's "The First Time Ever I Saw Your Face") in Billboard's year-end chart, based on both sales and airplay. In 1973, both titles were Grammy-nominated for both Song of the Year and Record of the Year, with Flack winning in both categories. This international success coincided with a new image, with O'Sullivan discarding the appearance he had used since 1967. He unveiled a more modern 'college-like' look in which he often wore a sweater bearing a large letter 'G'. This was a deliberate attempt to prevent "[making] an impact like Tiny Tim" in the US that "would have taken years to shake off," and the subsequent American edition of Himself, which included "Alone Again (Naturally)", featured an updated image of O'Sullivan on the album artwork. O'Sullivan followed up on the success of "Alone Again (Naturally)" with "Clair", which reached no. 2 in the United States on the Hot 100 and no. 1 in the UK, Norway, France, Belgium, Ireland and Canada (14 weeks in the Canadian Top 40). Its parent album (and O'Sullivan's second), Back to Front, spawned a further hit with "Out of the Question", which reached no. 17 in the US and no. 14 in Canada.

O'Sullivan's disc sales exceeded 10 million in 1972 and made him the top star of the year. His success led to his taking part in the BBC's anniversary programme Fifty Years of Music in November 1972. O'Sullivan was ranked by Record Mirror as the number one male singer of 1972, and in May 1973 he won an Ivor Novello award for "British Songwriter of the Year".

In 1973, O'Sullivan released his third album, I'm a Writer, Not a Fighter, which reflected a new emphasis on rock music and funk influences. Its lead single, the electric keyboard-based "Get Down", reached number one in the UK, Belgium and Germany, no. 7 in both the US and Canada, and no. 3 in the Netherlands. Following "Alone Again (Naturally)" and "Clair", "Get Down" was O'Sullivan's third million-seller, with the RIAA gold disc award presented on 18 September 1973.

O'Sullivan enjoyed nearly five years of success with MAM, a run that included seven UK top 10 singles and four UK top 10 albums; three US top 10 singles and one top 10 album; five Dutch top 10 singles and three top 10 albums; five New Zealand top 10 singles; three Canadian top 10 singles; and seven Japan top 10 singles. By 1974, his sales were decreasing. His fourth album A Stranger In My Own Back Yard, was his first to miss the top five on the UK Albums Chart, charting at no. 9. Its lead single, "A Woman's Place", generated controversy due to its lyric ("I believe / A woman's place is in the home"), seen by some as sexist. It was O'Sullivan's first single since his 1970 breakthrough to miss the top 40 of the UK singles chart, reaching a peak of no. 42. His November 1974 single "Christmas Song" reached no. 12 in the UK and no. 5 in Ireland. In June 1975, O'Sullivan had his last top 20 hit, "I Don't Love You But I Think I Like You".

O'Sullivan released a fifth album with MAM in 1977, Southpaw, but it failed to chart. He discovered his recording contract with MAM Records greatly favored the label's owner, Gordon Mills. A lawsuit followed, with a prolonged argument over how much money his songs had earned and how much of that money he had actually received. Eventually, in May 1982, the court found in O'Sullivan's favor, describing him as a "patently honest and decent man" who had not received a just proportion of the vast income his songs had generated. They awarded him £7 million in damages (£25,000,000 as of 2025). Although he won, the court battle put his recording career on hold, and he said he was unable to obtain management or a major record label deal.

=== Later career ===
In 1980, after a five-year hiatus, O'Sullivan returned to his old record label, CBS. The first single, "What's in a Kiss?", reached No. 19 in the UK, in 1980, and No. 21 in Japan. It was his first UK top 20 hit in five years. Following the release of his subsequent 1980, and 1982 albums, Off Centre and Life & Rhymes, and due in part to the then-ongoing MAM court case, O'Sullivan released no new material between 1983 and 1986. Apart from the single "So What?" in 1990 and a compilation album, Nothing But the Best, in 1991, O'Sullivan was absent from the charts until another compilation album, The Berry Vest of Gilbert O'Sullivan, returned him to the UK top 20 in 2004.

O'Sullivan is also noted for his role in bringing about the practice of clearing samples in hip hop music, as a result of the 1991 court case Grand Upright Music, Ltd. v. Warner Bros. Records, Inc., in which he sued rapper Biz Markie over the rights to use a sample of his song "Alone Again (Naturally)". He won 100% of the royalties and made sampling an expensive undertaking.

O'Sullivan has continued to record and perform into the 21st century. He enjoys particular acclaim in Japan. His album A Scruff at Heart was released in 2007, featuring "Just So You Know". On 14 July 2008, O'Sullivan released "Never Say Di". He appeared at the 2008 Glastonbury Festival, to which he performed his well known hits "Alone Again (Naturally)", "Clair", "Ooh Wakka Doo Wakka Day", "Nothing Rhymed", and "Get Down", but his latter two performances overran. O'Sullivan, feeling embarrassed, wrote a "long apologetic" letter to Michael Eavis, yet received no response; O'Sullivan was never asked to return to the Glastonbury stage, which led to a brief period of sourness between him and his agent. O'Sullivan played London's Royal Albert Hall on 26 October 2009. On 26 August 2010, O'Sullivan joined Hypertension, a record company whose artists have included Leo Sayer, Chris de Burgh, Fleetwood Mac, and Gerry Rafferty.

O'Sullivan's album Gilbertville was released on 31 January 2011; it featured "All They Wanted to Say", which dealt with the 2001 attacks on the World Trade Center, and his single "Where Would We Be (Without Tea)?". On 19 July 2011, O'Sullivan played live on the BBC Radio 2 Ken Bruce Show. On 26 August that year, the documentary Out on His Own was broadcast by BBC Four (before by Irish RTÉ). In March 2012, the compilation album Gilbert O'Sullivan: The Very Best Of – A Singer & His Songs entered the UK Albums Chart at No. 12. 2015 saw O'Sullivan re-emerge on Irish and BBC radio and television. He toured Ireland beginning of June and on 8 June 2015 his album Latin à la G! was released.

On 24 August 2018, O'Sullivan released his 19th studio album, Gilbert O'Sullivan. The album entered the UK Albums Chart at No. 20, his first UK charting studio album in over 40 years.

On 22 July 2022, O'Sullivan released his 20th studio album, Driven, produced by Andy Wright. The album peaked in the UK Albums Chart at No. 26.

In December 2023, councilors of Waterford City and County Council agreed to award O'Sullivan the Freedom of the City & County. He received the honor in person on 27 March 2024.

== Personal life ==
O'Sullivan purposely avoided dating at the peak of his career, as he feared that doing so would inhibit his songwriting abilities. In January 1980, he married his Norwegian girlfriend Aase Brekke. Later that year, the first of their two daughters, Helen-Marie, was born. Tara was born two years later.

O'Sullivan lives in Jersey.

== Album discography ==
- Himself (1971)
- Back to Front (1972)
- I'm a Writer, Not a Fighter (1973)
- A Stranger in My Own Back Yard (1974)
- Southpaw (1977)
- Off Centre (1980)
- Life & Rhymes (1982)
- In the Key of G (1989)
- Sounds of the Loop (1991)
- By Larry (1994)
- Every Song Has Its Play (1995)
- Singer Sowing Machine (1997)
- Irlish (2001)
- Piano Foreplay (2003)
- A Scruff at Heart (2007)
- Gilbertville (2011)
- Latin Ala G! (2015)
- Gilbert O'Sullivan (2018)
- Driven (2022)
- Songbook (2024)
- On the Record (2026)

== See also ==
- List of Irish musicians
- List of artists who reached number one on the UK singles chart
- List of artists who reached number one in the United States
- List of artists who reached number one on the U.S. Adult Contemporary chart
- List of performers on Top of the Pops
