= Johnnie Spence =

British musical arranger, director and orchestra leader

Johnnie Spence, born John Spence Abrahams (4 February 1936 – 15 August 1977), sometimes spelt Johnny Spence, was a British musical arranger, director, and orchestra leader. He is credited with the arrangements and musical direction of numerous records and television light entertainment works throughout the 1960s and 1970s, and was nominated for an Emmy Award for Outstanding Achievement in Music Direction of a Variety, Musical or Dramatic Program for his work on the 1969 television series This Is Tom Jones.

== Biography ==
Spence built a reputation as a pianist and arranger in the second part of the 1950s under the wings of Jack Parnell at ATV. (Bandleader and Musician Jack Parnell was appointed musical director for ATV in 1956). At ATV, music was prepared many shows. The orchestrations department at Elstree was large and famous, boasting such arrangers and orchestrators as Eric Rogers, David Lindup, Arthur Greenslade, Max Harris, Kenny Powell, Derek Scott and Johnnie Spence. Parnell held the post until 1982.

In the late 1950s, Spence became piano accompanist to Anne Shelton, a popular English vocalist. His early work was predominantly in comedy records for Parlophone,occasionally working alongside Sir George Martin, who would later find fame as producer of The Beatles. Spence's credits at this time included such work as the Bernard Cribbins single "Right Said Fred". In 1960, George Martin decided to use Johnnie Spence, who had just been signed to Parlophone as a musical director, for the upcoming session with his new recording-act Terry Parsons who was known by his stage name of Matt Monro. George Martin threw everything at this session, including a 23-piece orchestra for a big sound. Two tape machines were running at the same time: one in stereo and one in mono, doubling the cost of tape. From 2 November recording session emerged a song that reached no. 3 in the UK Singles Chart: "Portrait of My Love", the song that won Monro the Ivor Novello Award for "The Most Outstanding Song Of 1960" from the Songwriters' Guild of Great Britain. Spence became Matt's arranger and musical director, his name as closely associated with Matt Monro as Nelson Riddle's was with Frank Sinatra.

Johnnie Spence went on to become one of the most respected arrangers, conductors and composers in the business. With the success of Parlophone as a pop label, he became orchestral arranger for recordings and television shows for such acts as Shirley Bassey, Tom Jones, Engelbert Humperdinck and Cilla Black, Petula Clark and – during the 1970s – Gilbert O'Sullivan.

From his early twenties, Spence rapidly built a reputation as one of the country's most brilliant and imaginative musical directors, and was very much in demand by then on both sides of the Atlantic. He ultimately chose to become musical director for Tom Jones in 1969, working for the MAM organization (Management Agency and Music Ltd.), founded by Gordon Mills, one of the most successful show business agencies. In his new capacity, Spence became responsible for creating the sound on all their major hit recordings. Through producer Gordon Mills he became arranger/conductor for Gilbert O'Sullivan (1970/72) and musical director for a BBC-TV show Gilbert O'Sullivan In Concert (1971) and The Music Of Gilbert O'Sullivan (1972).

Although becoming a frequent visitor to America, he had plenty of work in the UK as a music arranger/musical director for television and radio shows, as well as live-performances, such as John Barry's Elizabeth Taylor in London (1963), The Tommy Steele Show (1964/65), Matt Monro at The Talk Of The Town (1965), BBC Show of the Week and Ella Fitzgerald Sings (1965), and several TV shows: Cilla At The Savoy (1966), The Shirley Bassey Show (1968/69), The Royal Variety Performance (1969), a Tom Jones UK-Tour with a 35-piece orchestra led by Johnnie Spence (1970), and various TV specials with Tom Jones, including This Is Tom Jones, and The Sound Of Petula (1974) with Petula Clark, featuring Gilbert O'Sullivan and the Peter Knight Orchestra & Chorus, with arrangements by Peter Knight, Steve Gray and Johnnie Spence.

Johnnie Spence and his Orchestra released several of their own records, predominantly of television and film themes; "Wheels" and "First Romance", a Jerry Lordan composition from his album: All My Own Work (1961). "The Dr. Kildare Theme" became a number 15 hit for Parlophone in 1962, his own composition "Sugar Beat", B-side of the single "Baby Elephant Walk" by Henry Mancini (1962) and "Step Inside Love" (1967), a Paul McCartney composition for Cilla Black. (1967). Spence also arranged Bob Hope singing Monty Norman's "Call Me Bwana" from the 1963 film of the same name. It is the only non-Bond film made by Eon Productions and producer Cubby Broccoli.

He recorded as The Johnnie Spence Big Band, Why Not (1968), on the Verve Records label, a swinging jazz album featuring Don Lusher (tb), Johnny Scott, Eddie Blair (tp) and Kenny Clare on drums. During 1963, Spence recorded an album with jazz singer Annie Ross, Sings A Handful Of Songs.

In April 1964, Ella Fitzgerald recorded three songs, to which Johnnie Spence wrote the arrangements, at EMI Recording Studios, Abbey Road, London, for her new album Hello Dolly. The single "Can't Buy Me Love" was a minor UK hit at no. 34.

On 2 July 1964, Cilla Black recorded the Lennon/McCartney song "It's for You", with a sort of jazzy waltz arrangement by Spence. "It displayed a degree of sophistication" according to producer George Martin, who also directed.

Spence also recorded in his final years with a smaller group as Johnnie Spence and The Family Tree, with a disco single "The Caves" (1976), as well as composing the music for the CBS TV series The Amazing Spiderman (1977).

Among his other compositions are "This Time" (1961) (using the pseudonym "Jack Abrahams", co-written with "Graham Fisher" aka George Martin), and "Going Places", with Don Black (1964), both recorded by Matt Monro. For the soundtrack of the film The Limbo Line, Spence wrote the music to "Here I Go Again", again with a Don Black lyric.

== Personal life ==
Johnnie Spence married Marion Horton (b. 1937) at St. Mary's Church, South Kensington on 5 January 1964, with Matt Monro as his best man. Their two children were born on 2 April 1965 (Sarah Jane) and 15 February 1973 (Jonathan Adam). Jonathan was known for his close relationship with Michael Jackson, whom he got to know while attending the Buckley School with Tito Jackson's son, who was also five years old at the time.

The family lived in Cheam, Surrey, England, before moving to the United States permanently. From 1969 onwards, the family lived in rented houses in California, close to Los Angeles recording studios. Because of his work as an arranger/conductor/composer, he made the decision in the summer of 1976 to take the leap and move to the US full-time with his family. They eventually moved into a comfortable home in Encino, California. He was able to secure lucrative work arranging and directing music for both television shows and movies.

Spence had just signed a contract with the Joey Bishop Show for ABC network when fate struck; he died suddenly at home in Los Angeles of a heart attack on 15 August 1977, at the age of 41. The funeral took place at Forest Lawn Memorial Park, Hollywood Hills on 20 August 1977 with among the pallbearers Tom Jones and Gilbert O'Sullivan. Matt Monro was holidaying in Barbados and could not get a flight to Los Angeles in time for the funeral.

Of Spence, Sir George Martin said, "Johnnie Spence was one of the best musicians I've ever known.He was a marvelous arranger, a great band man and his scores for brass, saxes, rhythm and strings were the best I've ever had, much better than I could do. His work with Matt Monro was one of the highlights, one of the joys of my life. He always turned up with a very tasteful score. He was a lovely man, a great character. He did tend to burn the candle at both ends though, and in the middle! It was a great tragedy when he died, it was such a shock, he was so young."

In November 1977 Gilbert O'Sullivan dedicated his fifth lp 'Southpaw' to Spence, "who taught me how to laugh."
