= MAM Records =

British record label

MAM Records was a British record label launched in 1970 by the management company Management Agency & Music Ltd. (MAM). It was founded by Gordon Mills and Tom Jones and distributed by Decca Records. The first single released on MAM was "I Hear You Knocking" by Dave Edmunds in 1970. Later that year, Gilbert O'Sullivan started his run of hit singles on MAM with "Nothing Rhymed", and he also provided MAM with its first hit album in 1971 with Himself. Other hit albums such as Back to Front, I'm a Writer, Not a Fighter, and A Stranger In My Own Back Yard followed.

Lynsey de Paul signed with the label in 1972 and her run of hit singles on MAM started with "Sugar Me". She also released her debut album, Surprise (Lynsey de Paul album), on MAM in 1973, and a best of compilation album, The World of Lynsey de Paul (also known as Lynsey Sings) in 1974. Engelbert Humperdinck was also a major recording artist with MAM; Gordon Mills was Engelbert Humperdinck's manager. While not scoring any hits, the label also released singles by Frank Ifield as well as Johnny Nash, Leapy Lee and Tina Charles. Distribution of MAM records switched to EMI in the mid 1970s.

The company was one of the most successful record companies in the United Kingdom throughout the early 1970s. It diversified into slot machines and airlines but, by the end of the 1970s, it was losing ground to American companies such as RCA Records.

MAM was sold in the 1980s to Chrysalis Records. Following the sale of Chrysalis to EMI Records in 1991, many recordings previously owned by MAM were reissued by EMI. After the breakup of EMI in 2013, Chrysalis was sold to BMG Rights Management. Now MAM's catalogue belongs to BMG, and is distributed by Warner Music's ADA.

== Staff ==
In 1978, Tab Martin and Dominic De Sousa were working for the label. Martin joined up as head of A&R and creative services. De Sousa was responsible for UK artists liaison. Geoffrey Everitt was the MD for the company at the time.
