= Clair (song) =

Single by Gilbert O'Sullivan

from the album Back to Front
- B-side: "What Could Be Nicer (Mum, The Kettle's Boiling)" (UK release), "Ooh-Wakka-Doo-Wakka-Day" (U.S. release)
- Released: October 1972
- Genre: Pop; soft rock
- Length: 3:03
- Label: MAM
- Songwriter: Raymond O'Sullivan
- Producer: Gordon Mills

Gilbert O'Sullivan singles chronology
"Ooh-Wakka-Doo-Wakka-Day" (1972)	"Clair" (1972)	"I Wish I Could Cry" (1973)

"Clair" is a song by Gilbert O'Sullivan, released in 1972 as the first single from his second album Back to Front. It was written by O'Sullivan and produced by Gordon Mills, and is one of O'Sullivan's biggest-selling singles.

On many versions of the album Back to Front, the song has been replaced by "Alone Again (Naturally)".

== Song details ==
The song is a love song from the point of view of a close family friend who babysits a young girl, though for the first part of the song, the ambiguous words lead one to think that it is a romantic song from one adult to another. The brief instrumental introduction is the sound of O'Sullivan whistling before he begins his vocal. The real Clair who inspired the song was the three-year-old daughter of O'Sullivan's producer-manager, Gordon Mills, and his wife, the model Jo Waring. The little girl's giggling is heard at the end of this song. The "Uncle Ray" mentioned in the song is O'Sullivan himself, a reference to his real name of Raymond O'Sullivan.

The harmonica solo in the song, played by Mills, modulates up a semitone, from A to B-Flat, before going back to A.

== Chart performance ==
"Clair" was the number one single on the UK Singles Chart for two weeks in November 1972, and number one in Canada on the RPM 100 singles chart. In late December, it peaked at number two on the Billboard Hot 100 in the US, behind both "Me and Mrs. Jones" by Billy Paul and "You're So Vain" by Carly Simon. "Clair" was also O'Sullivan's second and last number one hit on the U.S. Easy Listening chart, after "Alone Again (Naturally)".

=== Weekly singles charts ===
Chart (1972–1973)	Peak position
Argentina	8
Australia (KMR)	12
Canada RPM Top Singles	1
Canada RPM Adult Contemporary	1
France (IFOP)	3
Ireland (IRMA)	1
New Zealand (Listener)	2
Netherlands	4
Norway	1
South Africa (Springbok)	6
Sweden (Kvällstoppen)	6
UK Singles (Official Charts)	1
US Billboard Hot 100	2
US Adult Contemporary (Billboard)	1
US Cash Box Top 100	3

=== Year-end charts ===
Chart (1972)	Rank
Canada Top Singles (RPM)	41
UK	17

Chart (1973)	Rank
Australia	87
U.S. Billboard Hot 100	73
U.S. Cash Box	13

== Cover versions ==
- An Italian rendition in 1973 by the crooner Johnny Dorelli.
- A version by Singers Unlimited was sampled by producer J Dilla for the Slum Village song "Players". This version was also sampled by Logic (rapper) on the song "Upgraded".
- Another cover (in English) was recorded in 2006 by French singer Laurent Voulzy on his album La Septième Vague.
- Another cover was recorded in 2006 by Space Kelly on his album My Favourite Songbook.

== See also ==
- List of number-one singles of 1972 (Ireland)
- List of number-one singles from the 1970s (UK)
- List of number-one adult contemporary singles of 1972 (U.S.)
