= Alone Again (Naturally) =

1972 single by Gilbert O'Sullivan

- German single picture sleeve

Single by Gilbert O'Sullivan
- B-side: "Save It"
- Released: 18 February 1972 (UK); May 1972 (US)
- Recorded: 1971
- Genre: Soft rock; pop
- Length: 3:36
- Label: MAM
- Songwriter: Gilbert O'Sullivan
- Producer: Gordon Mills

Gilbert O'Sullivan singles chronology
"No Matter How I Try" (1971)	"Alone Again (Naturally)" (1972)	"Ooh-Wakka-Doo-Wakka-Day" (1972)

Music video
- "Alone Again (Naturally)" on YouTube

"Alone Again (Naturally)" (or "Alone Again") is a song by Irish singer-songwriter Gilbert O'Sullivan. Recorded in 1971, it became a worldwide hit. The song did not originally appear on his 1972 studio album Back to Front, but has been included in reissues (often replacing "Clair").

The single spent six non-consecutive weeks at number one on Billboard's Hot 100 between late July and early September 1972 in America. It ranked number two in the year-end chart and sold over two million copies.

The song was involved in a notable 1991 court case in which it set a precedent for the music industry that unauthorized sampling of music can constitute copyright infringement.

== Lyrics ==
"Alone Again (Naturally)" is a melancholic, introspective ballad. In the first verse, the singer contemplates suicide after having been left at the altar; in the second, he wonders why God let bad things happen; finally, he laments the death of his parents. O'Sullivan has said the song is not autobiographical: for example, his mother was alive during its composition, and he was not close to his father, who was abusive to his mother and died when the singer was 11 years old.

== Musical structure ==
Despite being essentially a pop ballad, the song has musical structure and harmony atypical for pop songs. It contains three verses and a bridge, with no chorus, as every verse ends with the song's title line, "Alone again, naturally". The verses are in the key of F♯ major and the bridge (positioned after the first two verses) changes the key to A major before returning to F♯ major for the third and final verse. The song has a relatively complex harmony using chords and progressions more common in jazz than in pop music, such as half diminished and flat ninth chords. The piano technique used on the song is typical to O'Sullivan's playing style with a percussive bass note on the left hand and the chord changes on the right.

== Reception ==
The song received extensive radio airplay in the months after its release and was critically praised. O'Sullivan commented: “Neil Diamond covered 'Alone Again (Naturally)' and said he couldn't believe a 21-year-old wrote it, but for me it was just one song I had written.” Neil Sedaka stated when he covered the song in 2020 that he wished that he himself had written the song, because its complexity was more typical of someone much older than 21.

=== Chart performance ===
Between late July and early September 1972 in America, the single spent six non-consecutive weeks at number one on Billboard's Hot 100 – interrupted by Looking Glass's "Brandy (You're a Fine Girl)" – and ranked number two in the year-end chart. It spent six weeks at number one, eleven weeks in the Top Ten, fifteen weeks in the Top 40 and eighteen weeks on the Hot 100. In a decade-end survey as counted down on syndicated radio show Casey Kasem's American Top 40, using Billboard statistics, "Alone Again (Naturally)" ranked five. It also spent six weeks at number one on Billboard's Easy Listening chart. In April 1972, "Alone Again" peaked at number three on the UK singles chart.

=== Charts ===
==== Weekly charts ====
Chart (1972)	Peak position
Australia (KMR)	2
Canada (RPM Top Singles)	1
Canada (RPM Adult Contemporary)	1
France (IFOP)	1
Ireland (IRMA)	2
Netherlands (Dutch Top 40)	21
Netherlands (Single Top 100)	18
New Zealand (Listener)	2
UK Singles (Official Charts)	3
US Billboard Hot 100	1
US Adult Contemporary (Billboard)	1
US Cash Box Top 100	1

==== Year-end charts ====
Chart (1972)	Rank
Australia	13
Canada Top Singles (RPM)	2
UK	36
US Billboard Hot 100	2
US Cash Box Top 100	2

==== All-time charts ====
Chart (1958-2018)	Position
US Billboard Hot 100	137

== Certifications ==
Region	Certification	Certified units/sales
New Zealand (RMNZ)	Gold	15,000^{‡}
United Kingdom (BPI)	Silver	200,000^{‡}
^{‡} Sales+streaming figures based on certification alone.

== Copyright lawsuit ==
Grand Upright Music, Ltd v. Warner Bros. Records Inc. was a copyright case heard in 1991 by the United States District Court for the Southern District of New York. The case pitted O'Sullivan against Biz Markie, after the rapper sampled O'Sullivan's song "Alone Again (Naturally)". The court ruled that sampling without permission can be copyright infringement. The judgment changed the hip-hop music industry, requiring that music sampling be preapproved by the original copyright owners to avoid a lawsuit.

== Cover versions ==
- Dutch comedians Kees van Kooten and Wim de Bie covered the song as 1948, also known under the title Toen was geluk heel gewoon (Back then, happiness was a simple thing). In the lyrics, they nostalgically reflect on their childhood in the late 1940s. The song became a hit in a version by Gerard Cox (and featured on his 1972 album Vrijblijvend..., meaning No-obligation...). It later served as inspiration for the sitcom starring Cox and frequent collaborator/ex-wife Joke Bruijs that ran from 1994 to 2009, Toen Was Geluk Heel Gewoon (a Dutch adaptation of the short-lived mid-1950s US sitcom The Honeymooners), which was the longest-running sitcom in the Netherlands.
- Pet Shop Boys released a cover version featuring Elton John and included in the reissue of their album Release (Further Listening 2001–2004) launched in 2017.
