= Gordon Mills =

British music industry manager and songwriter (1935–1986)

- Mills in the 1970s
- Born: Gordon William Mills; 15 May 1935; Madras, British India
- Died: 29 July 1986 (aged 51); Los Angeles, California, United States
- Occupations: Musician, songwriter, manager
- Years active: 1950−1986

Gordon William Mills (15 May 1935 – 29 July 1986) was a London-based music industry manager and songwriter. He was born in Madras, British India and grew up in Trealaw in the Rhondda Valley, South Wales. During the 1960s and 1970s, he managed the careers of three highly successful musical artists - Tom Jones, Engelbert Humperdinck and Gilbert O'Sullivan. Mills was also a songwriter, penning hits for Cliff Richard, Johnny Kidd & the Pirates, Freddie and the Dreamers, The Applejacks, Paul Jones, Peter and Gordon, and Tom Jones, most notably co-writing Jones's signature song "It's Not Unusual" with Les Reed.

== Biography ==
Mills's parents met and married in British India when his father was serving in the British Army. They returned to Britain shortly after Gordon's birth. An only child, Mills was taught to play the harmonica by his mother, Lorna.

At age 15, Mills joined a group playing in pubs and clubs in the South Wales Valleys. At age 17, he was called up for National Service and served in Germany and Malaya.

Returning to the UK, he competed in a harmonica championship event organised by Hohner at the Royal Albert Hall in London. He came second, qualifying him to represent the UK in the European final which he then won. Invited to join the Morton Fraser Harmonica Gang, he met musicians Don Paul and Ronnie Wells with whom he formed a trio known as the Viscounts. One song "Who Put the Bomp (in the Bomp, Bomp, Bomp)" (1961) became a minor hit in the UK Singles Chart. Their cover of "Short'nin' Bread" (1960) also had some earlier success.

Mills wrote some songs, with his first "I'll Never Get Over You", recorded by Johnny Kidd & the Pirates, reaching No. 4 in the UK in 1963. In the space of a year he wrote three more hits "Hungry for Love", "Jealous Girl" and "Three Little Words". "I'm the Lonely One" gave Cliff Richard and the Shadows a top 10 success in 1964.

At a party given by singer Terry Dene, Mills met model Jo Waring and they married two years later. Their daughter Clair, then three years old, became the subject of the 1972 song "Clair" by Gilbert O'Sullivan.

Watching a performance by Tommy Scott and the Senators One, one night in Cwmtillery, he saw a new young singer named Tom Woodward. Mills eventually became the manager of Woodward, whom he renamed "Tom Jones," after signing a management transfer contract with Woodward's joint managers Raymond William Godfrey and Raymond John Glastonbury ("Myron & Byron"). The two had already signed the singer to Decca Records, after terminating their previous recording agreement with Joe Meek of RGM Sound Ltd. They retained a 5% interest in Jones, but had to sue Jones and Mills in the High Court for non-fulfilment, finally obtaining a settlement, in 1969, for an undisclosed sum.

Jones' first single "Chills and Fever", originally recorded with Joe Meek, was released in late 1964, but was not a hit. Jones' second attempt was a song turned down by Sandie Shaw. The song was "It's Not Unusual" which propelled him into the top reaches of the chart. Mills then wanted to break Jones into recording film soundtracks but, after the relative failure of the James Bond theme song "Thunderball" (UK No. 35), another approach was needed.

Mills redesigned the singer's image into that of a crooner. Jones also began to sing material that appealed to a wider audience such as the big country hit "Green, Green Grass of Home". The strategy worked and Jones returned to the top of the charts in the United Kingdom and began hitting the Top 40 again in the United States. For the remainder of the decade, he scored a string of hits on both sides of the Atlantic. In 1967, Jones performed in Las Vegas for the first time, at the Flamingo.

In 1965, Mills started working with Gerry Dorsey, a singer who had been around for a long time without major success, changing his name to Engelbert Humperdinck and with television exposure on a Sunday night in 1967 at the London Palladium, a new star was born. Between 1967 and 1972, Mills had two of the biggest stars in the music industry under his control and he signed female singer/songwriter Lynsey de Paul who had just scored a huge hit with "Sugar Me", but by the end of 1973 she had left the label. As revealed in his 2015 autobiography, Tom Jones stated "We had Lynsey de Paul, a big star, though she fell out with Gordon (Mills) for wanting to produce her own records" but de Paul was also not happy about decisions on which of her songs were recorded and released too.

Mills cleverly renamed a number of famous singers. Tom Woodward became "Tom Jones" after a suggestion from Godfrey and Glastonbury, who had objected to Decca's plan to call him "Scotty" in 1965. Mills gave other pop music stars their stage names, such as Engelbert Humperdinck, and Gilbert O'Sullivan.

By 1973, both Jones's and Humperdinck's record sales had dropped dramatically, but Mills had found new talent with Gilbert O'Sullivan who kept MAM's business booming. Mills also produced O'Sullivan first four albums, spawning notable hits such as "Alone Again (Naturally), "Clair" and "Get Down". However, when his success started to fade, there was no replacement. By 1978, Jones was reduced to making country albums for the American-only market, Humperdinck had left Mills and O'Sullivan was no longer commercially successful. MAM was merged with Chrysalis Records in 1985.

Things turned more sour when O'Sullivan discovered his recording contract with MAM Records greatly favoured the label's owner. O'Sullivan sued his former manager on suspicion of the latter having "cooked the books", failing to pay O'Sullivan all of his duly earned royalties. It was also revealed that former label mate Lynsey de Paul earned a royalty rate of 8% - 3% higher than O'Sullivan. A lawsuit followed, with prolonged argument over how much money his songs had earned and how much of that money he had actually received. Eventually, in May 1982, the court found in O'Sullivan's favour, describing him as a "patently honest and decent man", who had not received a just proportion of the vast income his songs had generated. He was awarded £7 million in damages.

Mills died of stomach cancer in 1986, at the age of 51 and is buried in Burvale Cemetery, Hersham.

== Notable songs written or co-written by Mills ==
- "A Little You" (1965) (Freddie and the Dreamers, UK No. 26); (Tom Jones)
- "And I Tell The Sea" (1965) (Tom Jones)
- "Hide and Seek" (1966) (Tom Jones)
- "High Time" (1966) (Paul Jones) (UK No. 4)
- "Hungry for Love" (1963) (Johnny Kidd & the Pirates, UK No. 20)
- "If I Had You" (1966) (Tom Jones)
- "I Like The Look of You" (1964) (The Fortunes)
- "I'll Never Get Over You" (1963) (Johnny Kidd & the Pirates, UK No. 4)
- "I'll Never Let You Go" (1967) (Tom Jones)
- "I'm the Lonely One" (Cliff Richard, 1964, UK No. 8); retitled "The Lonely One" (Tom Jones, 1967)
- "I've Got a Heart" (1966) (Tom Jones)
- "It Takes a Worried Man" (1965) (Tom Jones)
- "It's Not Unusual" (1965) (Tom Jones, UK No. 1)
- "Key to My Heart" (1966) (Tom Jones)
- "Lady Godiva" (1966) (Peter and Gordon, UK No. 14)
- "Little by Little" (1966) (Tom Jones)
- "Not Responsible" (1966) (Tom Jones, UK No. 18)
- "Once Upon a Time" (1965) (Tom Jones)
- "Pretty Ribbons" (1968) (Engelbert Humperdinck)
- "Smile Away Your Blues" (1968) (Tom Jones)
- "Some Other Guy" (1965) (Tom Jones)
- "Take My Heart" (1966) (Engelbert Humperdinck)
- "Ten Guitars" (1966) (Engelbert Humperdinck)
- "The Rose" (1965) (Tom Jones)
- "Things I Wanna Do" (1967) (Tom Jones)
- "Three Little Words (I Love You)" (1964) (The Applejacks, UK No. 23)
- "Untrue Unfaithful" (1965) (Tom Jones)
- "Where Do You Belong" (1966) (Tom Jones)

== Gordon Mills Jr. ==
Gordon Mills' namesake son found some success with Strange Nature, and is now a record producer, songwriter and multi-instrumentalist session musician.

== See also ==
- Saint George's Hill
- Hersham
