= Barry Mason (disambiguation) =

Barry Mason (1935–2021) was an English songwriter.

Barry Mason may also refer to:

- Barry Mason (sculptor) (born 1952), British sculptor
- Barry Mason (cyclist) (1950–2011), English cycling activist
- Don Barry Mason (1950–2006), founder of the Psychedelic Shamanistic Institute
- Barry Mason (musician) (1947–2020), English guitarist and lutenist, director of the Early Music Centre.
- J. Barry Mason (born 1941), American academic
