= List of Ivor Novello Award winners and nominees (1970s–1980s) =

The Ivor Novello Awards are held annually since 1956 by the Ivors Academy, formerly the British Academy of Songwriters, Composers and Authors, to recognize the excellence in songwriting and composing. The following list consists of all the winners and nominees of the awards by year, the winners are listed first and in bold followed by the nominees if present.

The awards and nominations are received by the songwriters of the nominated work, not the performers, unless they also have songwriting credits.

== 1970s ==
=== 1970 ===
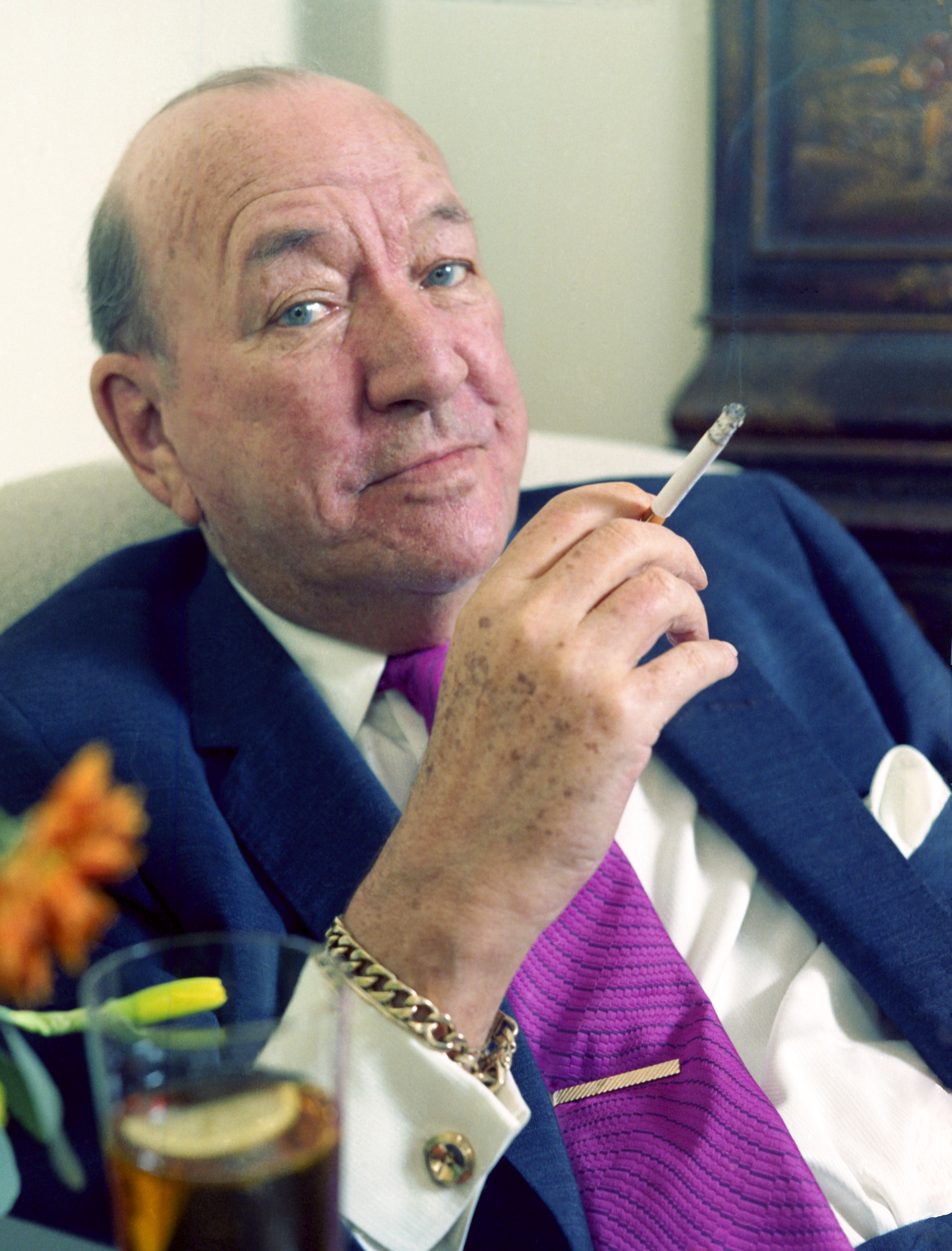
English playwright and composer Noël Coward received the award for Outstanding Services to British Music.

The 15th Ivor Novello Awards were presented on May 10, 1970 at Talk of The Town, London.

Category	Recipient and nominees
Outstanding Services to British Music	Noël Coward
Best Score from a Film or Musical Play	The Madwoman of Chaillot – Written by Michael Lewis
Best Song Musically and Lyrically	"Where Do You Go To (My Lovely)?" – Written and performed by Peter Sarstedt
British International Hit of the Year	"Love is All" – Written by Barry Mason and Les Reed; Performed by Les Reed
International Artist of the Year	Tom Jones
Special Award for Originality	"Space Oddity" – Written and performed by David Bowie
Special Award for Most Outstanding Contemporary Song	"Melting Pot" – Written by Roger Cook and Roger Greenaway; Performed by Blue Mink
The "A" Side of the Record Issued in 1969 Which Achieved the Highest Certified British Sales	"Get Back" – Written by John Lennon and Paul McCartney; Performed by The Beatles
The British Songwriter of the Year	Tony Macaulay
The Most Performed Song of the Year	"Ob-La-Di, Ob-La-Da" – Written by John Lennon and Paul McCartney; Performed by The Beatles
The Year's Outstanding Light Orchestral Arranger/Composer	Ernest Tomlinson

=== 1971 ===
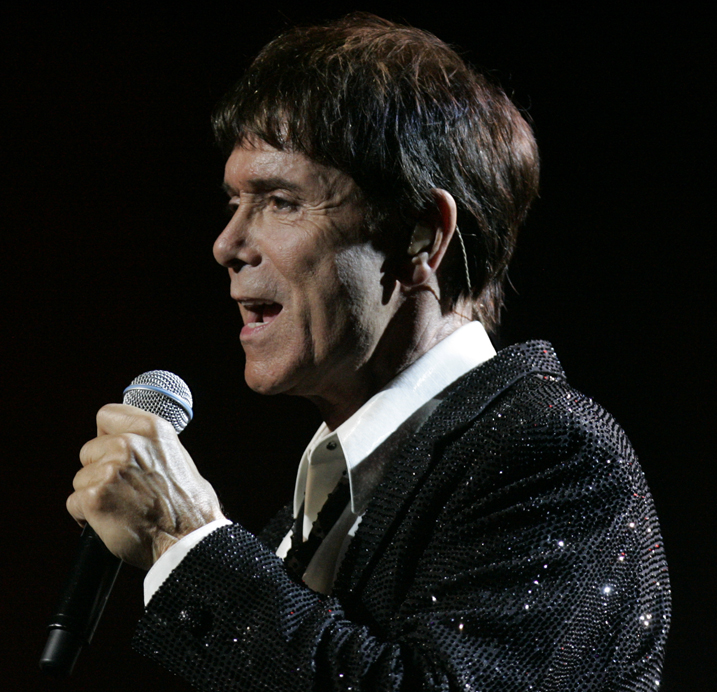
Outstanding Services to British Music recipient Cliff Richard

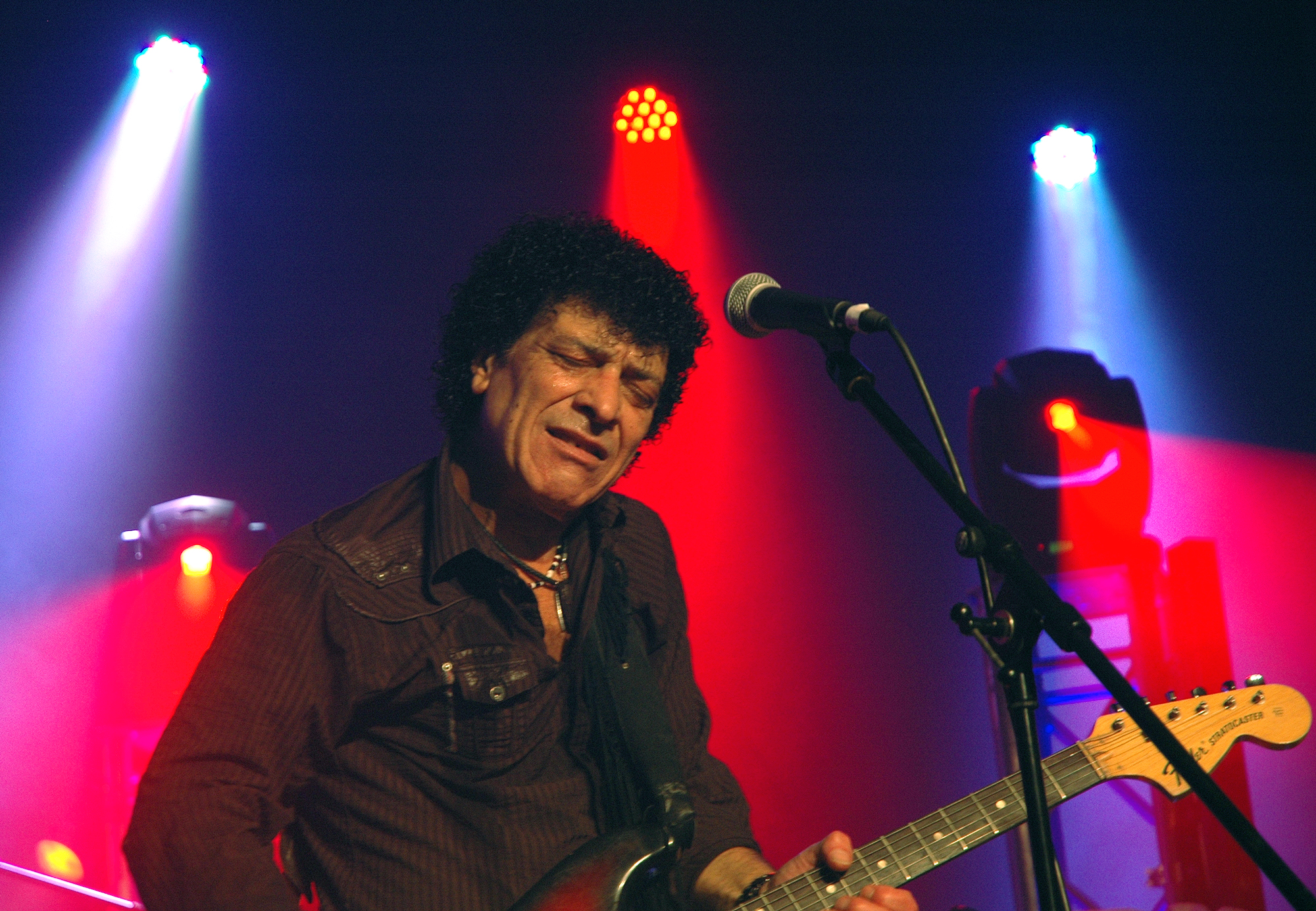
Ray Dorset won two awards for Mungo Jerry's debut single "In the Summertime".

The 16th Ivor Novello Awards were in 1971.

Category	Recipient and nominees
Outstanding Services to British Music	Cliff Richard
Best Song Musically and Lyrically	"Something" – Written by George Harrison; Performed by The Beatles
Best Theme from Any Film, Television Programme or Theatrical Production	""Who Do You Think You Are Kidding, Mr Hitler?" – Written by Jimmy Perry and Derek Taverner
British Songwriters of the Year	Roger Cook and Roger Greenaway
Light Music Award	"March from the Colour Suite" – Written by Gordon Langford
The "A" Side of the Record Issued in 1970 Which Achieved the Highest Certified British Sales	"In the Summertime" – Written by Ray Dorset, Performed by Mungo Jerry
The Best Ballad or Romantic Song, Musically and Lyrically	"Home Lovin' Man" – Written by Roger Cook, Roger Greenaway and Tony Macaulay; Performed by Andy Williams
The Best Novel or Unusual Song, Musically and Lyrically	"Grandad" – Written by Herbie Flowers and Ken Pickett; Performed by Clive Dunn
The Best Pop Song	"Love Grows" – Written by Tony Macaulay and Barry Mason; Performed by Edison Lighthouse
The International Hit of the Year by British Writers	"In the Summertime" – Written by Ray Dorset, Performed by Mungo Jerry
The Most Performed Work of the Year	"Yellow River" – Written by Jeff Christie; Performed by Christie

=== 1972 ===
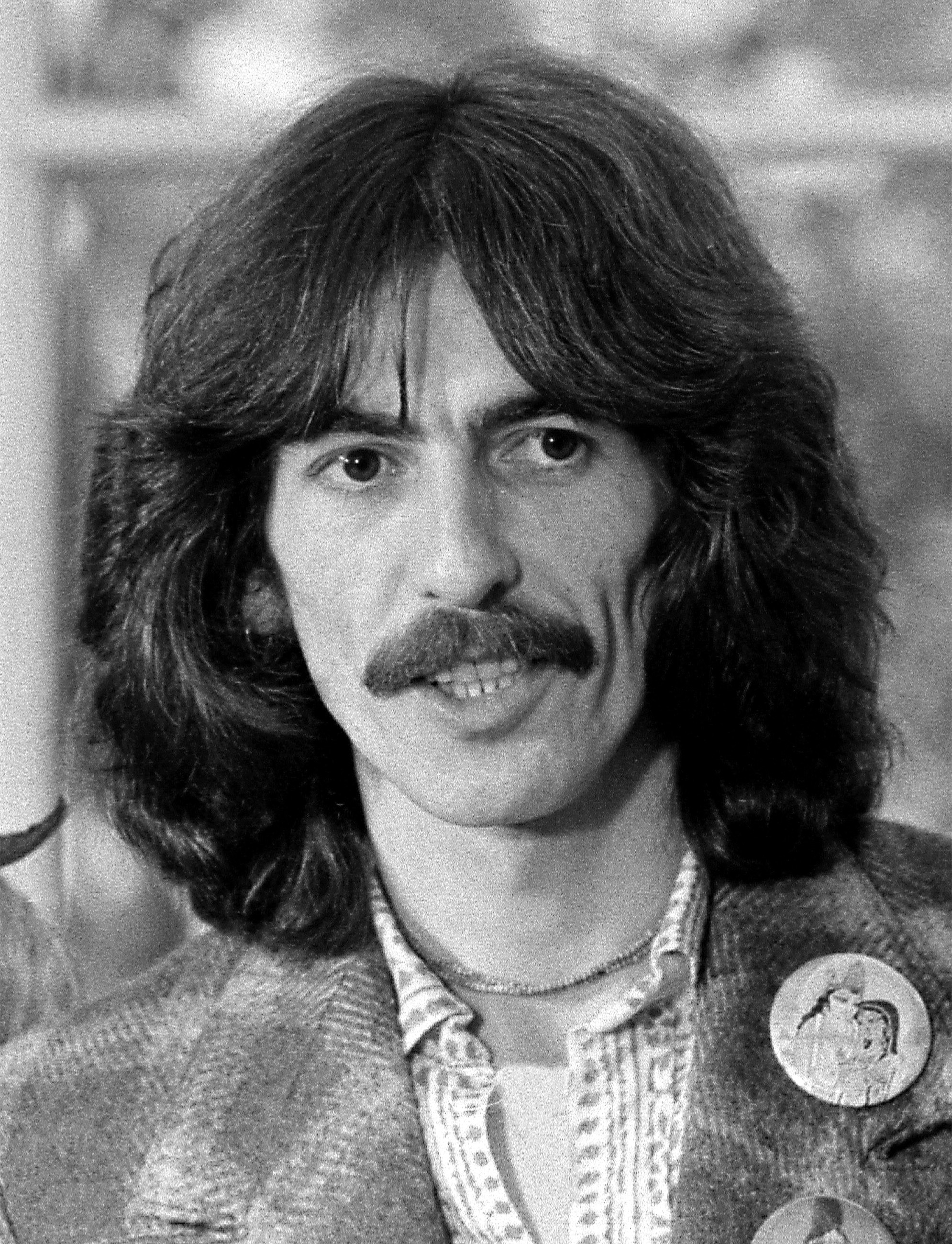
George Harrison won two awards for the song "My Sweet Lord".

The 17th Ivor Novello Awards were broadcast on BBC Radio 2 on June 28, 1972, with the winners being presented by Robin Boyle.

Category	Recipient and nominees
Outstanding Services to British Music	Jimmy Kennedy
Best Song Musically and Lyrically	"Don't Let It Die" – Written and performed by Hurricane Smith
British Songwriters of the Year	Roger Cook and Roger Greenaway
Entertainment Music	Ron Goodwin
The "A" Side of the Record Issued in 1971 Which Achieved the Highest Certified British Sales	"My Sweet Lord" – Written and performed by George Harrison
The Best Ballad or Romantic Song, Musically and Lyrically	"No Matter How I Try" – Written and performed by Gilbert O'Sullivan
The Best Novel or Unusual Song, Musically and Lyrically	"Ernie" – Written and performed by Benny Hill
The Best Pop Song, Musically and Lyrically	"A Simple Game" – Written by Mike Pinder; Performed by The Moody Blues
The Best Song and/or Theme Score from Any Film, Television Programme or Theatrical Production	"I Don't Know How to Love Him" – Written by Andrew Lloyd Webber and Tim Rice
The International Hit of the Year by British Writers	Jesus Christ Superstar – Written by Andrew Lloyd Webber and Tim Rice
The Most Performed Work of the Year	"My Sweet Lord" – Written and performed by George Harrison

=== 1973 ===
The 18th Ivor Novello Awards took place at the Music Publishers Association Lunch at the Connaught Rooms, London on May 3, 1973.

Category	Recipient and nominees
Outstanding Services to British Music	Vivian Ellis
Best Song Musically and Lyrically	"Without You" – Written by Tom Evans and Peter Ham; Performed by Badfinger
British Songwriter of the Year	Gilbert O'Sullivan
The "A" Side of the Record Issued in 1972 Which Achieved the Highest Certified British Sales	"Mouldy Old Dough" – Written by Nigel Fletcher and Rob Woodward; Performed by Lieutenant Pigeon
The Best Ballad or Romantic Song	"The First Time Ever I Saw Your Face" – Written by Ewan MacColl; Performed by Roberta Flack
The Best Novel or Unusual Song	"The People Tree" – Written by Leslie Bricusse and Anthony Newley
Best Pop Song	"Oh, Babe, What Would You Say?" – Written and performed by Hurricane Smith
The Best Song and/or Theme or Score from Any Film or Theatrical Production	Diamonds Are Forever – Written by John Barry and Don Black
The Best Song and/or Theme from Any Radio or Television Programme	Colditz – Written by Robert Farnon
The International Hit of the Year by British Writers	"Without You" – Written by Tom Evans and Peter Ham; Performed by Badfinger
The Most Performed Work of the Year	"Beg, Steal or Borrow" – Written by Tony Cole, Graeme Hall and Steve Wolfe; Performed by The New Seekers

=== 1974 ===
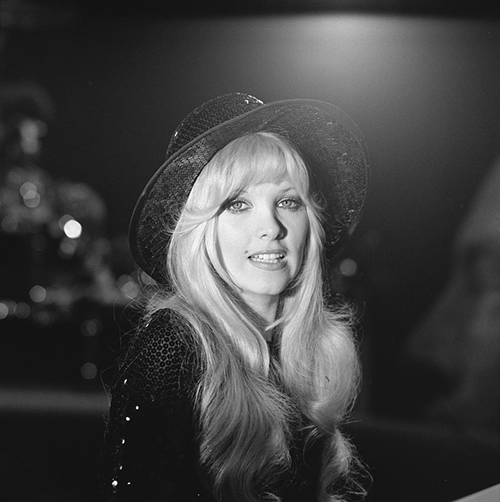
Lynsey de Paul won Best Ballad or Romantic Song for "Won't Somebody Dance with Me".

The 19th Ivor Novello Awards were broadcast on BBC Radio 2 on May 17, 1974. The awards were introduced by Alan Black.

Category	Recipient and nominees
Outstanding Services to British Music	Tolchard Evans
Best Selling British Record	"I Love You Love Me Love" – Written by Mike Leander; Performed by Gary Glitter
Best Song Musically and Lyrically	"Daniel" – Written by Elton John and Bernie Taupin; Performed by Elton John
Most Performed British Song	"Get Down" – Written and performed by Gilbert O'Sullivan
Songwriters of the Year	Mike Chapman and Nicky Chinn
The Best Ballad or Romantic Song	"Won't Somebody Dance with Me" – Written and performed by Lynsey de Paul
The Beast Beat Song	"Rubber Bullets" – Written by Lol Creme, Kevin Godley and Graham Gouldman; Performed by 10cc
The Best Novel or Unusual Song	"Nice One Cyril" – Written by Helen Clarke and Harold Spiro; Performed by Cockerel Chorus
The Best Pop Song	"You Won't Find Another Fool Like Me" – Written by Tony Macaulay and Geoff Stephens; Performed by The New Seekers
The Best Score from Any Film or Theatrical Production	Jesus Christ Superstar – Written by Andrew Lloyd Webber and Tim Rice
The Best Song or Theme from Any Radio or TV Programme	Galloping Home from The Adventures of Black Beauty – Written by Denis King
The International Hit of the Year by British Writers	"Power to All Our Friends" – Written by Guy Fletcher and Doug Flett; Performed by Cliff Richard

=== 1975 ===
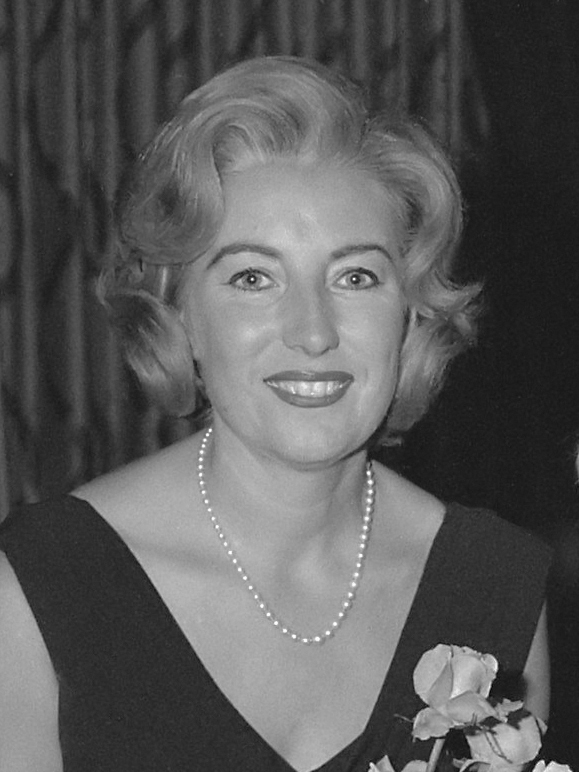
Outstanding Services to British Music recipient Vera Lynn

The 20th Ivor Novello Awards took place at the Dorchester Hotel, London and were broadcast on BBC Radio 2 on May 22, 1975. The awards were introduced by Len Jackson.

Category	Recipient and nominees
Outstanding Services to British Music	Vera Lynn
Best Selling British Record	"Tiger Feet" – Written by Mike Chapman and Nicky Chinn; Performed by Mud
Most Performed British Song	"Wombling Song" – Written by Mike Batt; Performed by The Wombles
Songwriters of the Year	Phil Coulter and Bill Martin
The Best Light Orchestral Work	"Four Dances from Aladdin" – Written by Ernest Tomlinson
The Best New Musical	Treasure Island – Written by Cyril Ornadel and Hal Shaper
The Best Pop Song	"Kung Fu Fighting" – Written and performed by Carl Douglas
The Best Theme from a Film or a Stage, Radio or Television Production	"No, Honestly" from the series of the same name – Written by Lynsey de Paul
The British International Hit of the Year	"The Night Chicago Died" – Written by Peter Callander and Mitch Murray; Performed by Paper Lace
The Best Song Musically and Lyrically	"Streets of London" – Written and performed by Ralph McTell

=== 1976 ===
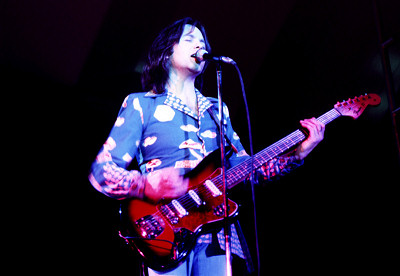

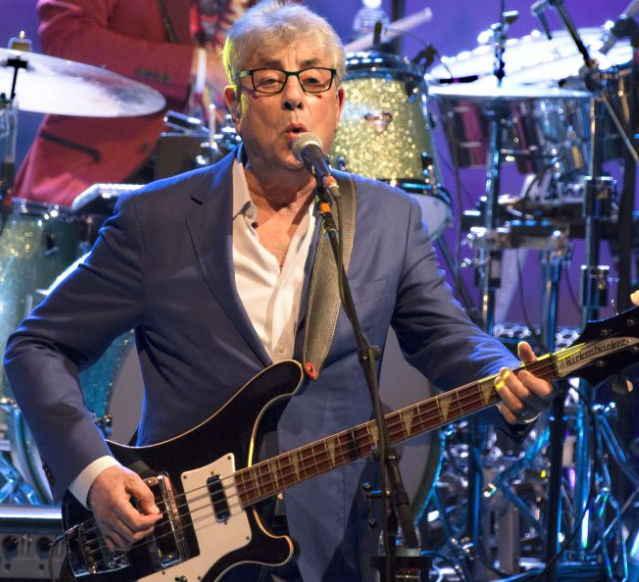
10cc members Eric Stewart (top) and Graham Gouldman (bottom) received three awards for the song "I'm Not in Love".

The 21st Ivor Novello Awards took place on May 11, 1976, at the Dorchester Hotel, London.

Category	Recipient and nominees
Outstanding Services to British Music	Dick James
Best British Musical	Great Expectations – Written by Cyril Ornadel and Hal Shaper
Best British Work for Children	"Captain Noah and His Floating Zoo" – Written by Michael Flanders and Joseph Horovitz
Best Film Score	Murder on the Orient Express – Written by Richard Rodney Bennett
Best Instrumental Work	"Introduction and Air to a Stained Glass Window" – Written by John Gregory
Best Middle of the Road Song	"Harry" – Written by Catherine Howe
Best Selling British Record	"Bohemian Rhapsody" – Written by Freddie Mercury; Performed by Queen
Best Theme from TV or Radio	"The Edwardians" from Upstairs, Downstairs – Written by Alexander Faris
International Hit of the Year	"I'm Not in Love" – Written by Graham Gouldman and Eric Stewart; Performed by 10cc
Most Performed British Work	"I'm Not in Love" – Written by Graham Gouldman and Eric Stewart; Performed by 10cc
Music Publisher of the Year	Geoffrey Heath
Songwriters of the Year	Wayne Bickerton and Tony Waddington
The Best Pop Song	"I'm Not in Love" – Written by Graham Gouldman and Eric Stewart; Performed by 10cc

=== 1977 ===
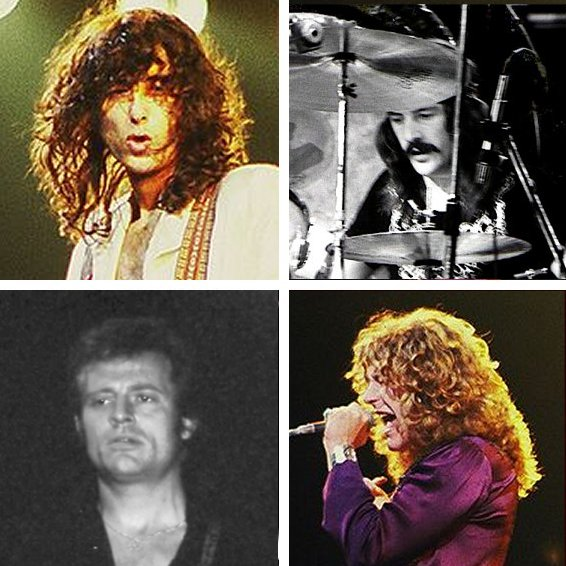
Led Zeppelin members Jimmy Page, John Bonham, Robert Plant, John Paul Jones received the Special Award for Outstanding Contribution to British Music.

The 22nd Ivor Novello Awards were held at the Grosvenor House, London.

Category	Recipient and nominees
Outstanding Services to British Music	Adrian Boult
Best Instrumental Work	"Rain Forest" – Written by Biddu; Theme from The Sweeney – Written by Harry South; "Them from a Non-Existent TV Series" – Written by Elton John and Bernie Taupin
Best Middle of the Road Song	"Music" – Written and performed by John Miles; "Don't Cry for Me Argentina" – Written by Tim Rice and Andrew Lloyd Webber; Performed by Julie Covington; "Miss You Nights" – Written by Dave Townsend; Performed by Cliff Richard
Best Theme from Radio or Television Production	Sam – Composed by John McCabe; Bouquet of Barbed Wire – Composed by Dennis Farnon; The Sweeney – Composed by Harry South
International Hit of the Year	"Save Your Kisses for Me" – Written by Tony Hiller, Martin Lee and Lee Sheriden; Performed by Brotherhood of Man; "Don't Go Breaking My Heart" – Written by Elton John and Bernie Taupin; Performed by Elton John and Kiki Dee; "You Should Be Dancing" – Written by Barry Gibb, Maurice Gibb and Robin Gibb; Performed by Bee Gees
Most Performed Work and Best Selling "A" Side	"Save Your Kisses for Me" – Written by Tony Hiller, Martin Lee and Lee Sheriden; Performed by Brotherhood of Man; "Don't Go Breaking My Heart" – Written by Elton John and Bernie Taupin; Performed by Elton John and Kiki Dee
Songwriter of the Year	Biddu
Special Award for Outstanding Contribution to British Music	Led Zeppelin (John Bonham, John Paul Jones, Jimmy Page and Robert Plant)
Special Award	Monty Norman for the "James Bond Theme"
The Best Pop Song	"Don't Go Breaking My Heart" – Written by Elton John and Bernie Taupin; "Heart on My Sleeve" – Written by Benny Gallagher and Graham Lyle; Performed by Gallagher and Lyle; "We Do It" – Written by Russell Stone; Performed by R&J Stone

=== 1978 ===
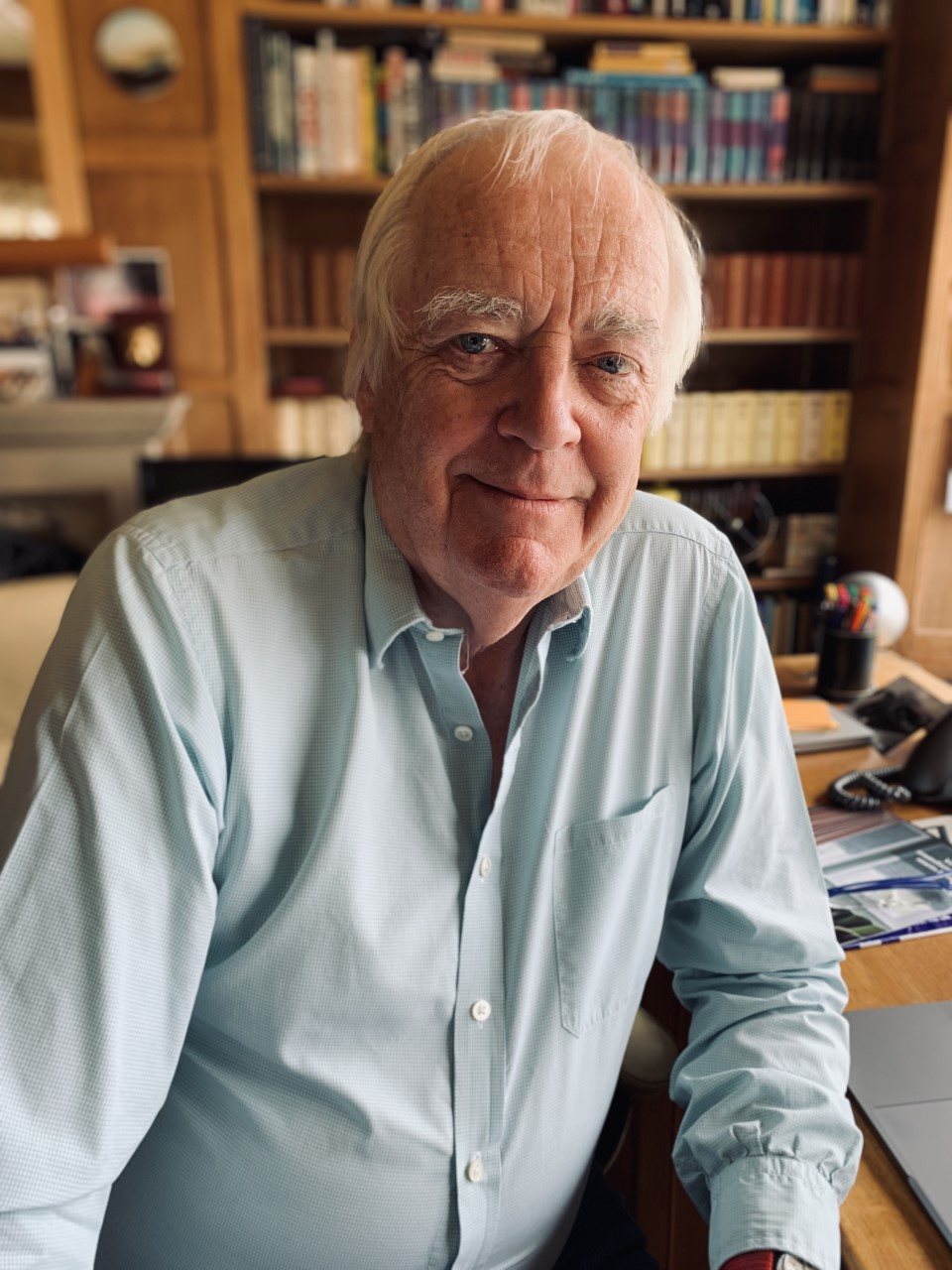

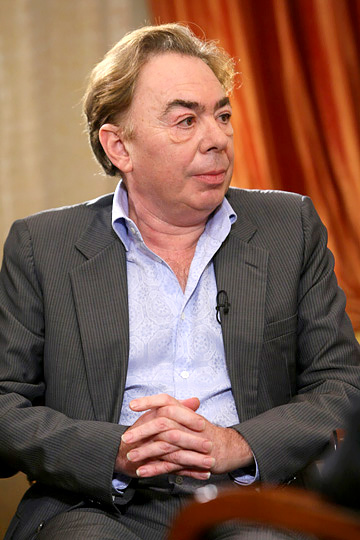
Tim Rice (top) and Andrew Lloyd Webber (bottom) received three awards for the song "Don't Cry for Me Argentina".

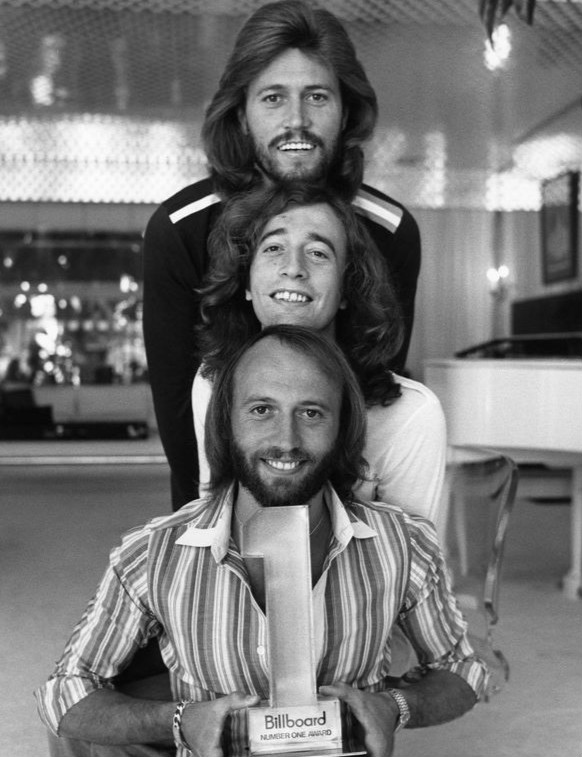
The Bee Gees won two awards for "How Deep Is Your Love".

The 23rd Ivor Novello Awards were held at the Grosvenor House, London.

Category	Recipient and nominees
Outstanding Services to British Music	Harry Mortimer
Best Song Musically and Lyrically	"Don't Cry for Me Argentina" – Written by Tim Rice and Andrew Lloyd Webber, Performed by Julie Covington; "How Deep Is Your Love" – Written by Barry Gibb, Robin Gibb and Maurice Gibb; Performed by Bee Gees; "Sam" – Written by John Farrar, Hank Marvin and Don Black; Performed by Olivia Newton-John
Songwriter of the Year	Tony Macaulay
Special Award	Bee Gees (Barry Gibb, Maurice Gibb and Robin Gibb)
The Best British Musical	Privates on Parade – Written by Denis King and Peter Nichols
The Best Film Music or Song	"How Deep Is Your Love" from Saturday Night Fever – Written by Barry Gibb, Robin Gibb and Maurice Gibb Performed by Bee Gees; The Duellists – Composed by Howard Blake; The Scarlet Buccaneer – Composed by John Addison
The Best Instrumental or Popular Orchestral Work	"Cavatina" – Composed by Stanley Myers; "Love Transformation" – Composed by Roger Greenaway; "The Snow Goose" – Composed by Ed Welch and Spike Milligan
The Best Pop Song	"How Deep Is Your Love" – Written by Barry Gibb, Robin Gibb and Maurice Gibb Performed by Bee Gees; "Boogie Nights" – Written by Rod Temperton; Performed by Heatwave; "Don't Cry for Me Argentina" – Written by Tim Rice and Andrew Lloyd Webber; Performed by Julie Covington; "Mull of Kintyre" – Written by Paul McCartney and Denny Laine; Performed by Wings
The Best Selling "A" Side	"Mull of Kintyre" – Written by Paul McCartney and Denny Laine; Performed by Wings; "Don't Cry for Me Argentina" – Written by Tim Rice and Andrew Lloyd Webber; Performed by Julie Covington; "Don't Give Up on Us" – Written by Tony Macaulay; Performed by David Soul
The Best Theme from a Radio or Television Production	Poldark – Composed by Kenyon Emrys-Roberts; Love for Lydia – Composed by Harry Rabinowitz; Wings – Composed by Alexander Faris
The International Hit of the Year	"Don't Cry for Me Argentina" – Written by Tim Rice and Andrew Lloyd Webber; Performed by Julie Covington; "How Deep Is Your Love" – Written by Barry Gibb, Robin Gibb and Maurice Gibb Performed by Bee Gees; "Angelo" – Written by Tony Hiller, Lee Sheriden and Martin Lee; Performed by Brotherhood of Man
The Most Performed Work	"Don't Cry for Me Argentina" – Written by Tim Rice and Andrew Lloyd Webber; Performed by Julie Covington; "Don't Give Up on Us" – Written by Tony Macaulay; Performed by David Soul; "I Don't Want to Put a Hold On You" – Written by Berni Flint and Michael Flint; Performed by Berni Flint
The Outstanding Lyric of the Year	"Matchstalk Men and Matchstalk Cats and Dogs" – Written by Michael Coleman and Brian Burke; Performed by Brian and Michael; "Don't Cry for Me Argentina" – Written by Tim Rice and Andrew Lloyd Webber; Performed by Julie Covington; "Heaven on the 7th Floor" – Written by Dominique Bugatti and Frank Musker; Performed by Paul Nicholas

=== 1979 ===
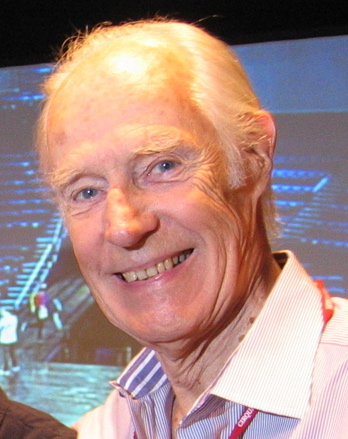
Outstanding Services to British Music recipient George Martin

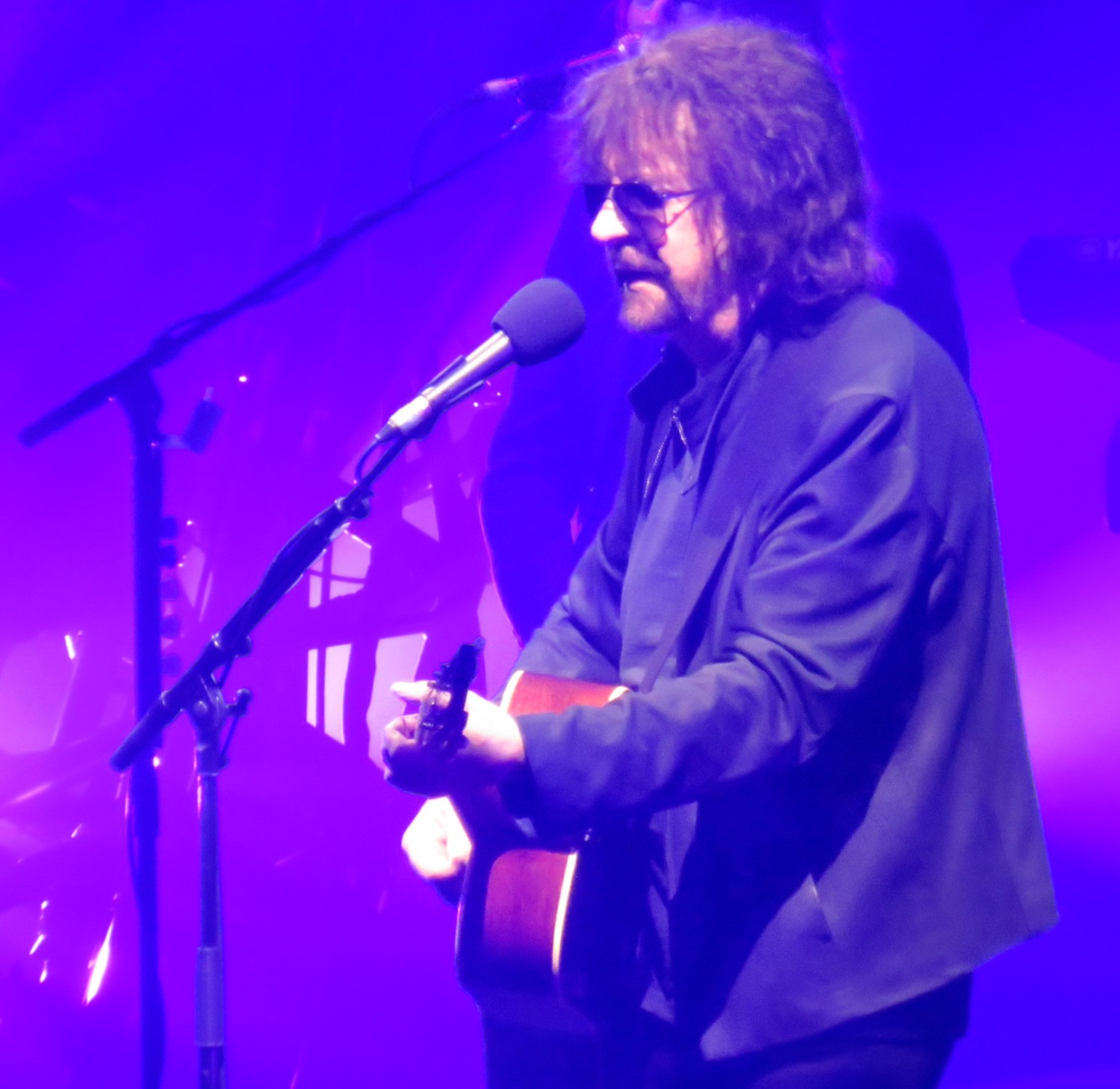
Special Award for Outstanding Contribution to British Music recipient Jeff Lynne

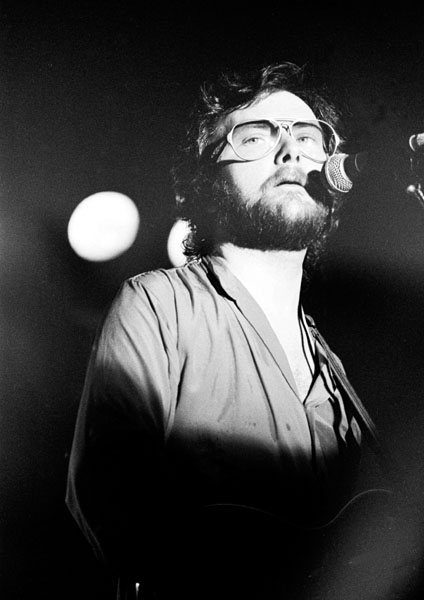
Scottish singer-songwriter Gerry Rafferty won two awards for his song "Baker Street".

The 24th Ivor Novello Awards were held at the Grosvenor House, London.

Category	Recipient and nominees
Outstanding Services to British Music	George Martin
Best Film Score	The Silent Witness – Composed by Alan Hawkshaw; The 39 Steps – Composed by Ed Welch; Watership Down – Composed by Angela Morley, Mike Batt and Malcolm Williamson
Best Song Musically and Lyrically	"Baker Street" – Written and performed by Gerry Rafferty; "Can't Smile Without You" – Written by Chris Arnold, David Martin and Geoff Morrow; Performed by The Carpenters; "Wuthering Heights" – Written and performed by Kate Bush
Songwriters of the Year	Barry Gibb, Robin Gibb and Maurice Gibb
Special Award for Outstanding Contribution to British Music	Jeff Lynne
Special Award for Services to British Songwriters	Victor Knight
The Best British Musical	Evita – Written by Andrew Lloyd Webber and Tim Rice
The Best Film Song	"Bright Eyes" from Watership Down – Written by Mike Batt; Performed by Art Garfunkel; "Grease" from the film of the same name – Written by Barry Gibb; Performed by Frankie Valli; "Stayin' Alive" from Saturday Night Fever – Written by Barry Gibb, Robin Gibb and Maurice Gibb; Performed by Bee Gees
The Best Instrumental or Popular Orchestral Work	"Song for Guy" – Composed by Elton John; "Heartsong" – Composed by Gordon Giltrap; "Dr. Who" – Composed by Ron Grainer
The Best Pop Song	"Baker Street" – Written and performed by Gerry Rafferty; "Night Fever" – Written by Barry Gibb, Robin Gibb and Maurice Gibb; Performed by Bee Gees; "Wuthering Heights" – Written by Kate Bush
The Best Selling "A" Side	"Night Fever" – Written by Barry Gibb, Robin Gibb and Maurice Gibb; Performed by Bee Gees; "Matchstalk Men and Matchstalk Cats and Dogs" – Written by Michael Coleman and Brian Burke; Performed by Brian and Michael; "Rat Trap" – Written by Bob Geldof; Performed by The Boomtown Rats
The Best Theme from a Radio or Television Production	Lillie – Composed by Joseph Horovitz; Fawlty Towers – Composed by Dennis Wilson; "Hong Kong Beat" – Composed by Richard Denton and Martin Cook
The International Hit of the Year	"Stayin' Alive" – Written by Barry Gibb, Robin Gibb and Maurice Gibb; Performed by Bee Gees; "Dreadlock Holiday" – Written by Eric Stewart and Graham Gouldman; Performed by 10cc; "It's a Heartache" – Written by Ronnie Scott and Steve Wolfe, Performed by Bonnie Tyler
The Most Performed Work	"Night Fever" – Written by Barry Gibb, Robin Gibb and Maurice Gibb; Performed by Bee Gees; "Mull of Kintyre" – Written by Paul McCartney; Performed by Bee Gees; "The Floral Dance" – Written by Katie Moss
The Outstanding British Lyric	"The Man with the Child in His Eyes" – Written and performed by Kate Bush; "Baker Street" – Written and performed by Gerry Rafferty; "Railway Hotel" – Written and performed by Mike Batt

== 1980s ==
=== 1980 ===
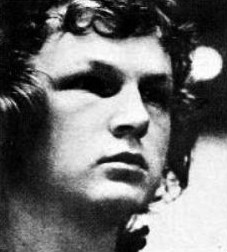
Mike Batt received three awards in 1980, two of them for the song "Bright Eyes" from the film Watership Down.

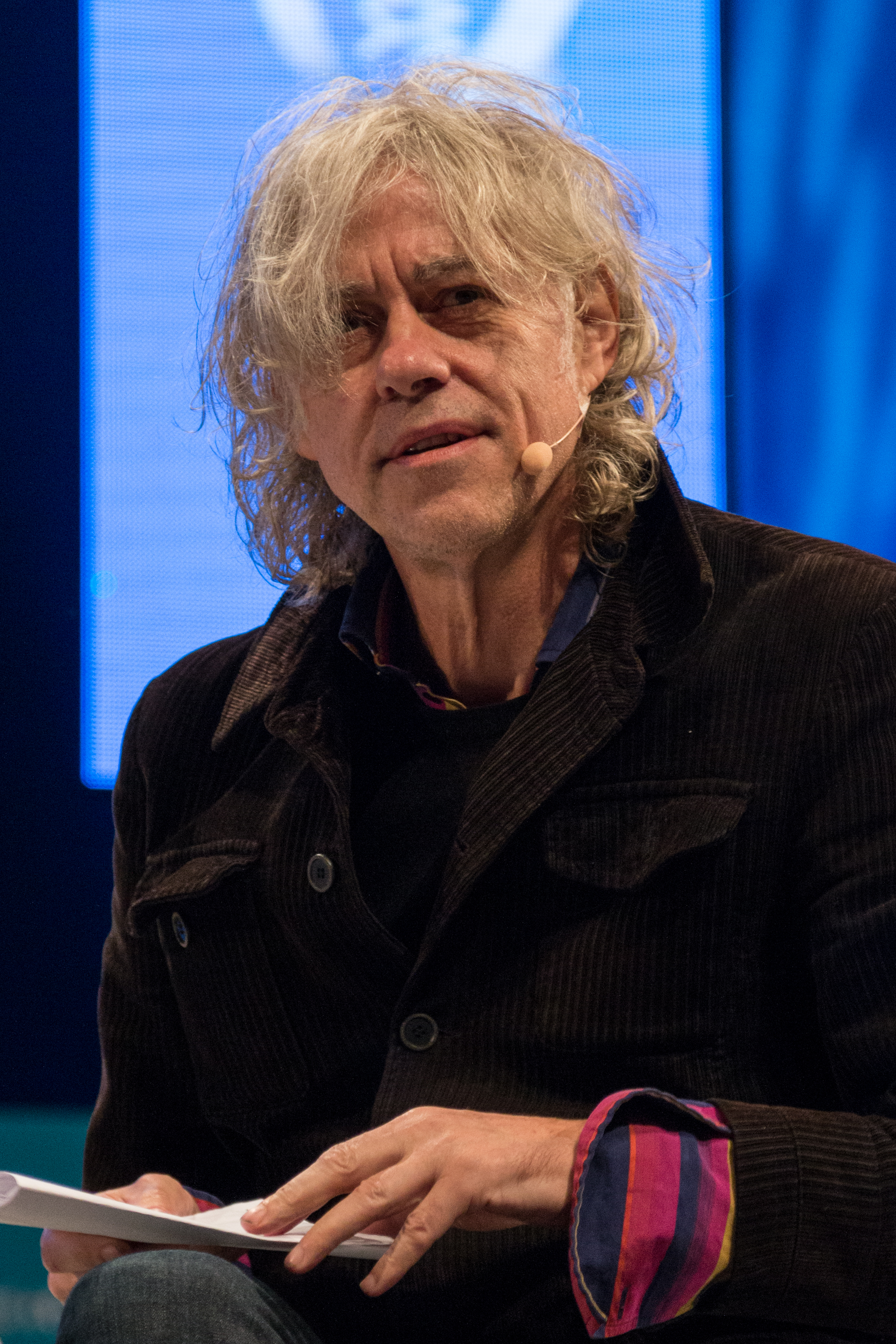
Bob Geldof won two awards for the song "I Don't Like Mondays".

The 25th Ivors were held at the Grosvenor House, London.

Category	Recipient and nominees
Outstanding Services to British Music	**Robert Mayer**
Best British Musical	**Songbook – Written by Monty Norman and Julian More**; A Day in Hollywood / A Night in the Ukraine – Written by Dick Vosburgh and Frank Lazarus
Best Song Musically and Lyrically	**"The Logical Song" – Written by Rick Davies and Roger Hodgson; Performed by Supertramp**; "Bright Eyes" – Written by Mike Batt; Performed by Art Garfunkel; "We Don't Talk Anymore" – Written by Alan Tarney; Performed by Cliff Richard
Songwriter of the Year	Ben Findon
Special Award for International Achievement	**Paul McCartney**
Special Award for Lifetime Achievement	**Edgar Yipsel Harburg and Jimmy Kennedy**
The Best Film Song, Theme or Score	**Caravans – Written by Mike Batt**; Music Machine – Written by Leslie Hurdle and Frank Ricotti; Yanks – Written by Richard Rodney Bennett
The Best Instrumental or Popular Orchestral Work	**"War of the Worlds" – Written by Jeff Wayne and Gary Osborne**; "African Sanctus" – Written by David Fanshawe; "The Valley of Swords" – Written by Mike Batt
The Best Pop Song	**"I Don't Like Mondays" – Written by Bob Geldof; Performed by The Boomtown Rats**; "Off the Wall" – Written by Rodney Temperton; Performed by Michael Jackson; "Video Killed the Radio Star" – Written by Bruce Woolley, Trevor Horn and Geoff Downes; Performed by The Buggles
The Best Selling "A" Side	**"Bright Eyes" – Written by Mike Batt; Performed by Art Garfunkel**; "Another Brick in the Wall" – Written by Roger Waters; Performed by Pink Floyd; "I Don't Like Mondays" – Written by Bob Geldof; Performed by The Boomtown Rats
The Best Theme from a Radio or Television Production	**"Nunc Dimittis" from Tinker Tailor Soldier Spy – Written by Geoffrey Burgon**; Secret Army – Written by Robert Farnon; Shoestring – Written by George Fenton
The International Hit of the Year	**"We Don't Talk Anymore" – Written by Alan Tarney; Performed by Cliff Richard**; "I Don't Like Mondays" – Written by Bob Geldof; Performed by The Boomtown Rats; "Too Much Heaven" – Written by Barry Gibb, Robin Gibb and Maurice Gibb; Performed by Bee Gees
The Most Performed Work	**"Bright Eyes" – Written by Mike Batt, Performed by Art Garfunkel**; "Cavatina" – Composed by Stanley Myers; "We Don't Talk Anymore" – Written by Alan Tarney; Performed by Cliff Richard
The Outstanding British Lyric	**"I Don't Like Mondays" – Written by Bob Geldof; Performed by The Boomtown Rats**; "Bright Eyes" – Written by Mike Batt; Performed by Art Garfunkel; "He Was Beautiful" – Written by Cleo Laine

=== 1981 ===
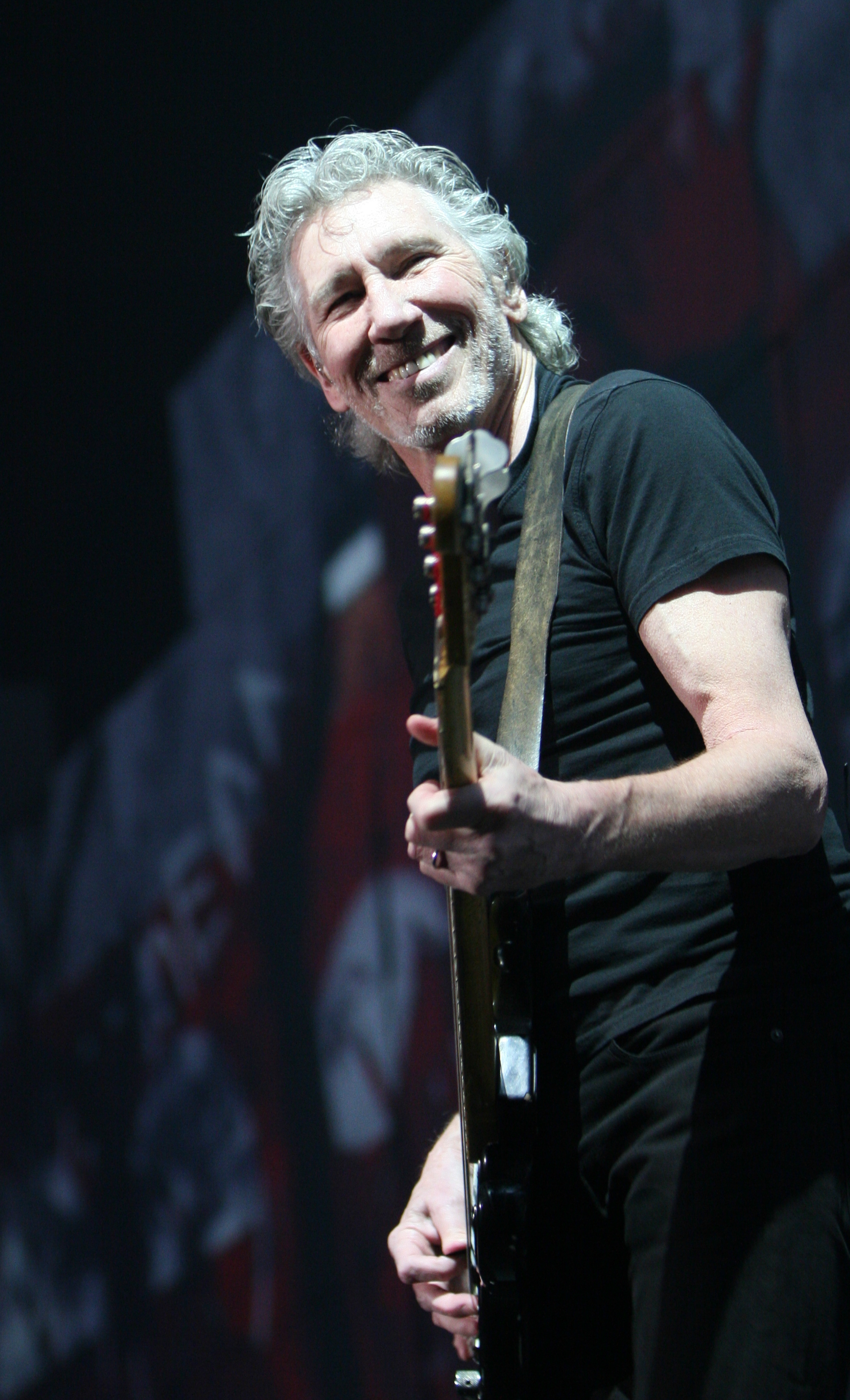
Pink Floyd member Roger Waters won International Hit of the Year for the song "Another Brick in the Wall".

The 26th Ivors were held at the Grosvenor House, London.

Category	Recipient and nominees
Outstanding Services to British Music	**William Walton**
Best Song Musically and Lyrically	**"Woman in Love" – Written by Barry Gibb and Robin Gibb; Performed by Barbra Streisand**; "Babooshka" – Written and performed by Kate Bush; "Together We Are Beautiful" – Written by Ken Leray; Performed by Fern Kinney; "Your Ears Should Be Burning Now" – Written by Tony Macaulay and Don Black; Performed by Marti Webb
Songwriter of the Year	**Ben Findon**
Special Award for Outstanding Contribution to British Music	**John Lennon**
The Best Film Song, Theme or Score	**"Xanadu" – Written by Jeff Lynne, Performed by Olivia Newton-John and Electric Light Orchestra**; "Flash" – Written by Brian May; Performed by Queen; "Silver Dream Machine" – Written and performed by David Essex
The Best Pop Song	**"Stop the Cavalry" – Written and performer by Jona Lewie**; "Don't Stand So Close to Me" – Written by Sting; Performed by The Police; "What You're Proposing" – Written by Francis Rossi and Bernard Frost; Performed by Status Quo
The Best Selling "A" Side	**"There's No One Quite Like Grandma" – Written by Gordon Lorenz; Performed by St Winifred's School Choir**; "Don't Stand So Close to Me" – Written by Sting; Performed by The Police; "Woman in Love" – Written by Barry Gibb and Robin Gibb; Performed by Barbra Streisand
The Best Theme for a Radio or Television Production	**"I Could Be So Good For You" from Minder – Written by Gerard Kenny and Patricia Waterman**; Fox – Written by George Fenton; Juliet Bravo – Written by J.S. Bach and arranged by Derek Goom
The International Hit of the Year	**"Another Brick in the Wall" – Written by Roger Waters; Performed by Pink Floyd**; "Another One Bites the Dust" – Written by John Deacon; Performed by Queen; "Woman in Love" – Written by Barry Gibb and Robin Gibb
The Most Performed Work	**"Together We Are Beautiful" – Written by Ken Leray; Performed by Fern Kinney**; "I'm in the Mood for Dancing" – Written by Ben Findon, Michael Myers and Robert Puzey, Performed by The Nolan Sisters; "January February" – Written by Alan Tarney; Performed by Barbara Dickson
The Outstanding British Lyric	**"Take That Look Off Your Face" – Written by Don Black; Performed by Marti Webb**; "Stop the Cavalry" – Written and performed by Jona Lewie; "Woman in Love" – Written by Barry Gibb and Robin Gibb; Performed by Barbra Streisand

=== 1982 ===
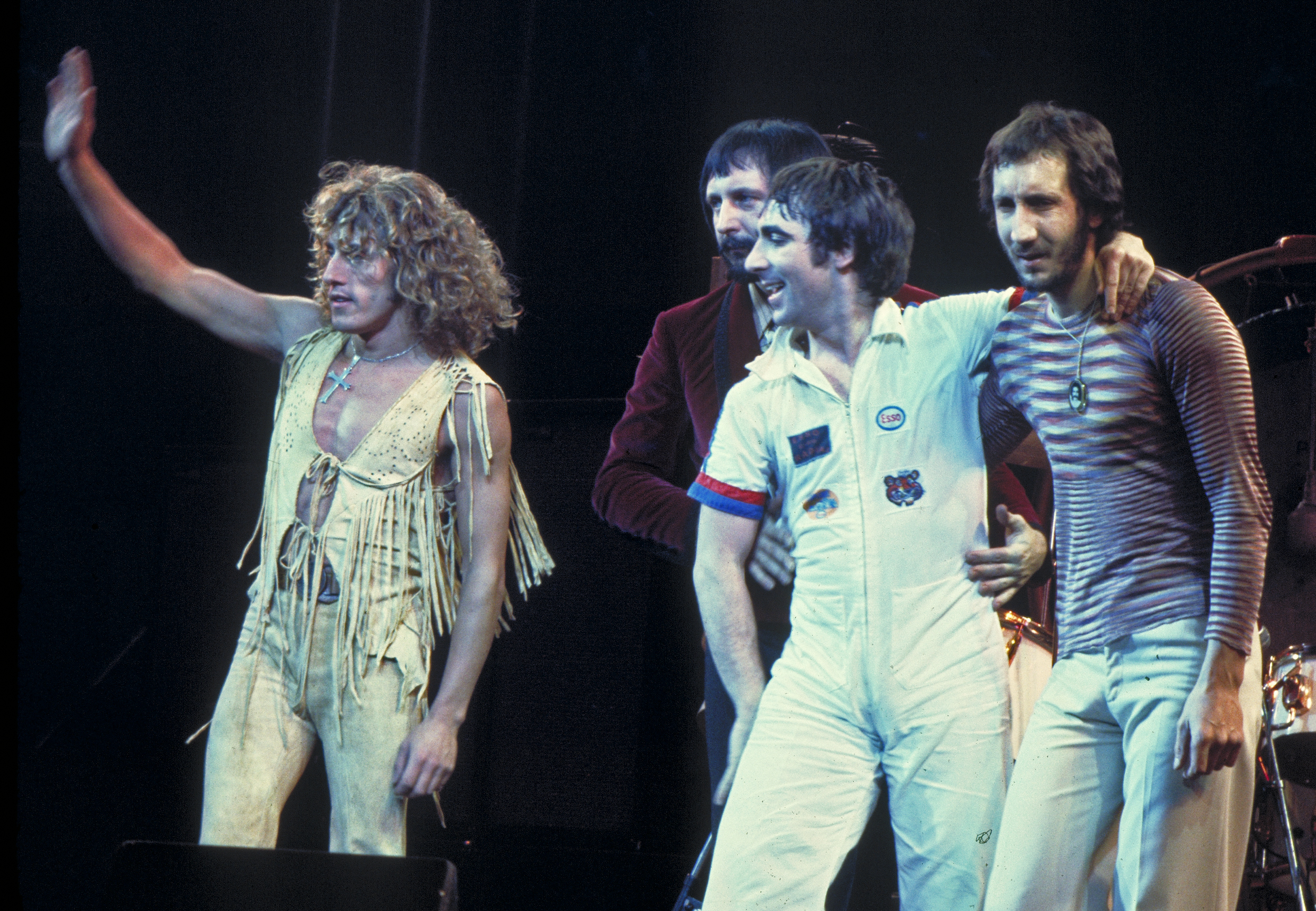
The Who members Roger Daltrey, John Entwistle, Kenney Jones, Keith Moon and Pete Townshend received the Special Award for Outstanding Contribution to British Music.

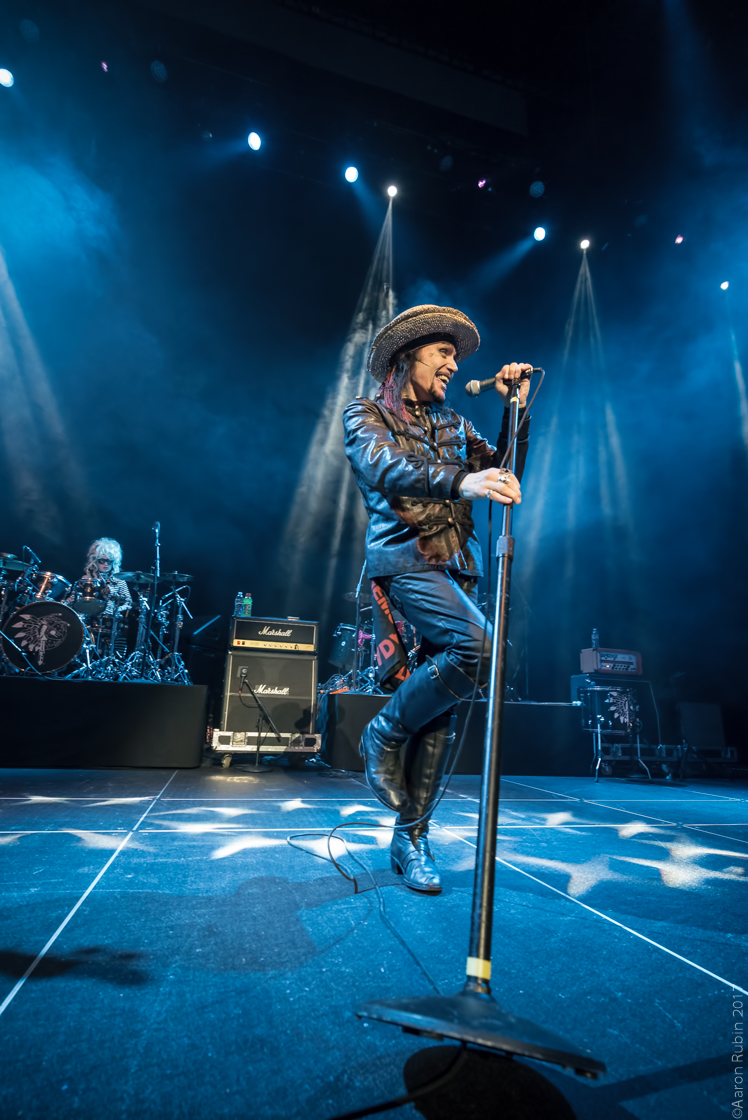
Adam Ant received two awards alongside Marco Pirroni, Songwriters of the Year and Best Selling "A" Side.

The 27th Ivors were held at the Grosvenor House, London.

Category	Recipient and nominees
Outstanding Services to British Music	**Lennox Berkeley**
Best British Musical	**Cats – Written by Andrew Lloyd Webber and Trevor Nunn**
Best Film Theme or Song	**The French Lieutenant's Woman – Written by Carl Davis**; "For Your Eyes Only" from the film of the same name – Written by Bill Conti and Mick Leeson; Performed by Sheena Easton; "Without Your Love" from McVicar – Written by Billy Nichols; Performed by Roger Daltrey
Best Song Musically and Lyrically	**"Memory" – Written by Andrew Lloyd Webber, T.S. Eliot and Trevor Nunn; Performed by Elaine Paige**; "The Land of Make Believe" – Written by Andy Hill and Pete Sinfield; Performed by Bucks Fizz; "Woman" – Written and performed by John Lennon
Best Theme from a TV or Radio Production	**Brideshead Revisited – Written by Geoffrey Burgon**; The Flame Trees of Thika – Written by Ken Howard and Alan Blaikley; Shillingbury Tales – Written by Ed Welch
Songwriters of the Year	**Adam Ant and Marco Pirroni**
Special Award for Outstanding Contribution to British Music	**The Who (Roger Daltrey, John Entwistle, Kenney Jones, Keith Moon and Pete Townshend)**
The Best Pop Song	**"Every Little Thing She Does Is Magic" – Written by Sting; Performed by The Police**; "Don't You Want Me" – Written by Phil Oakey, Adrian Wright and Jo Callis; Performed by The Human League; "Wired for Sound" – Written by Alan Tarney and B.A. Robertson; Performed by Cliff Richard
The Best Selling "A" Side	**"Stand and Deliver" – Written by Adam Ant and Marco Pirroni; Performed by Adam and the Ants**; "Don't You Want Me" – Written by Phil Oakey, Adrian Wright and Jo Callis; Performed by The Human League; "Vienna" – Written by Billy Currie, Chris Cross, Warren Cann and Midge Ure; Performed by Ultravox
The International Hit of the Year	**"In the Air Tonight" – Written and performed by Phil Collins**; "(Just Like) Starting Over" – Written and performed by John Lennon; "Every Little Thing She Does Is Magic" – Written by Sting; Performed by The Police; "Woman in Love" – Written by Barry Gibb and Robin Gibb; Performed by Barbra Streisand
The Most Performed Work	**"You Drive Me Crazy" – Written by Ronnie Harwood; Performed by Shakin' Stevens**; "Woman" – Written and performed by John Lennon
The Outstanding British Lyric	**"Woman" – Written and performed by John Lennon**; "The One That You Love" – Written by Graham Russell; Performed by Air Supply; "When He Shines" – Written by Florrie Palmer and Dominic Bugatti; Performed by Sheena Easton

=== 1983 ===
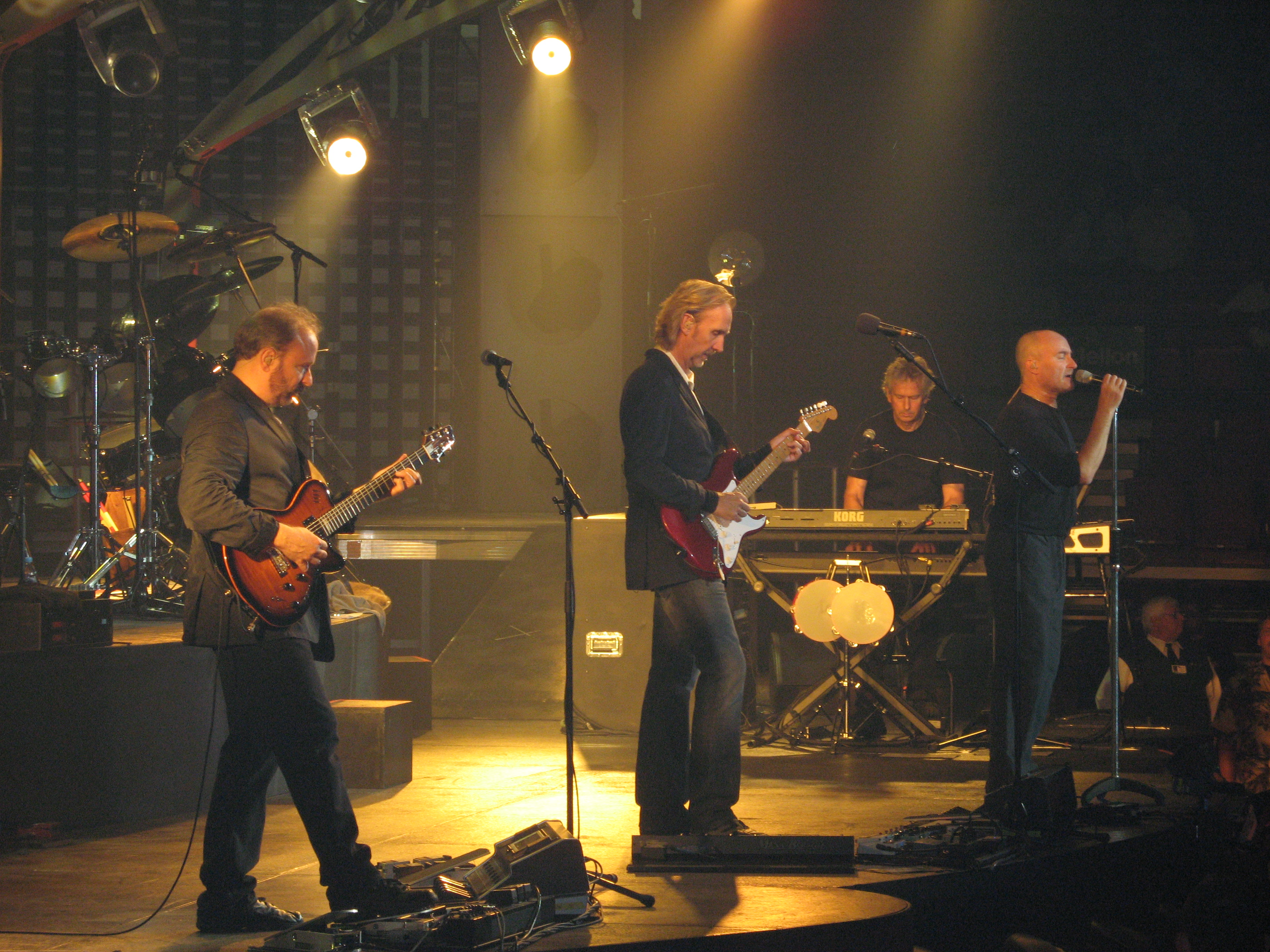
Genesis members Tony Banks, Phil Collins, Peter Gabriel, Steve Hackett and Mike Rutherford received the award for Outstanding Contribution to British Music.

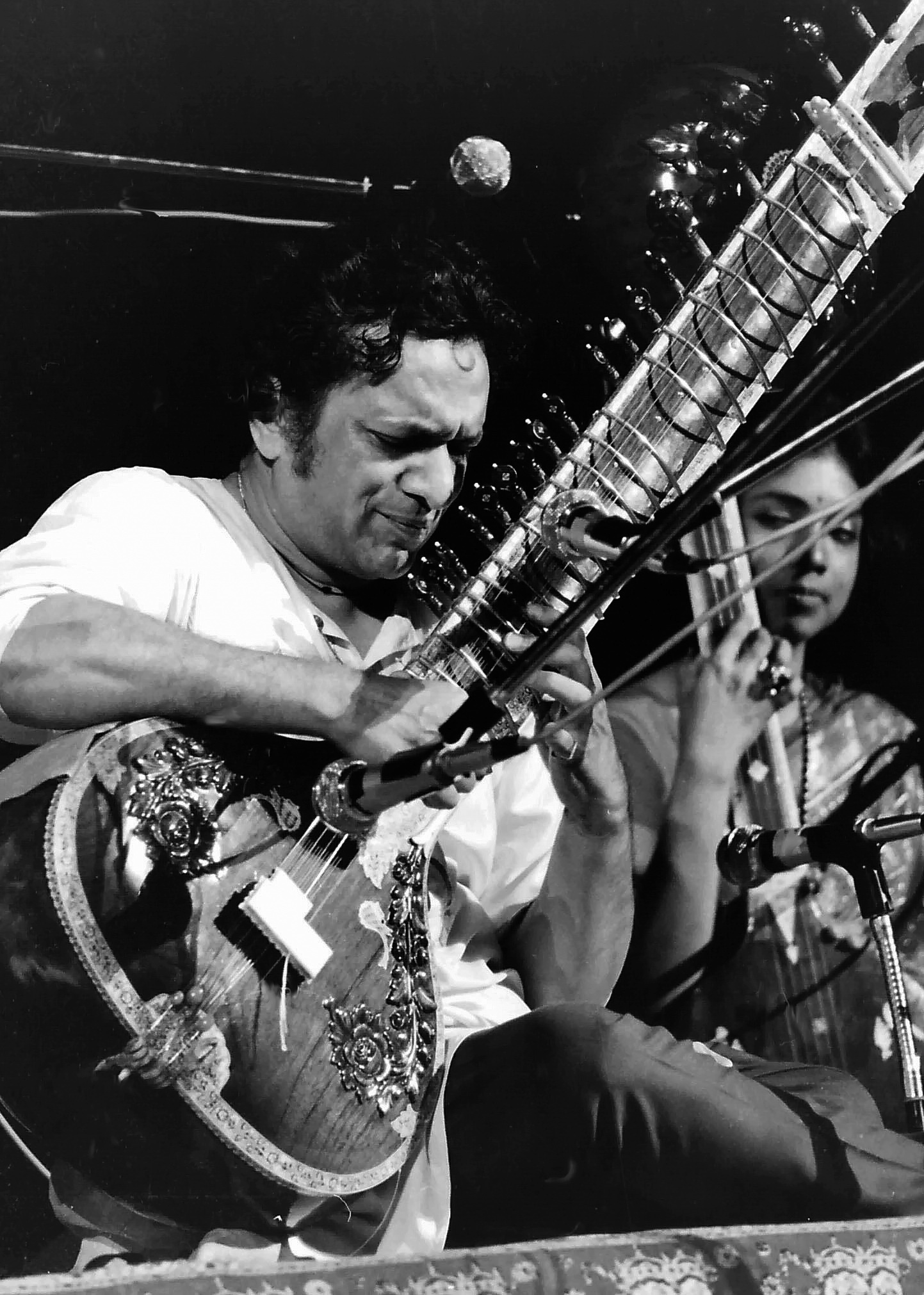

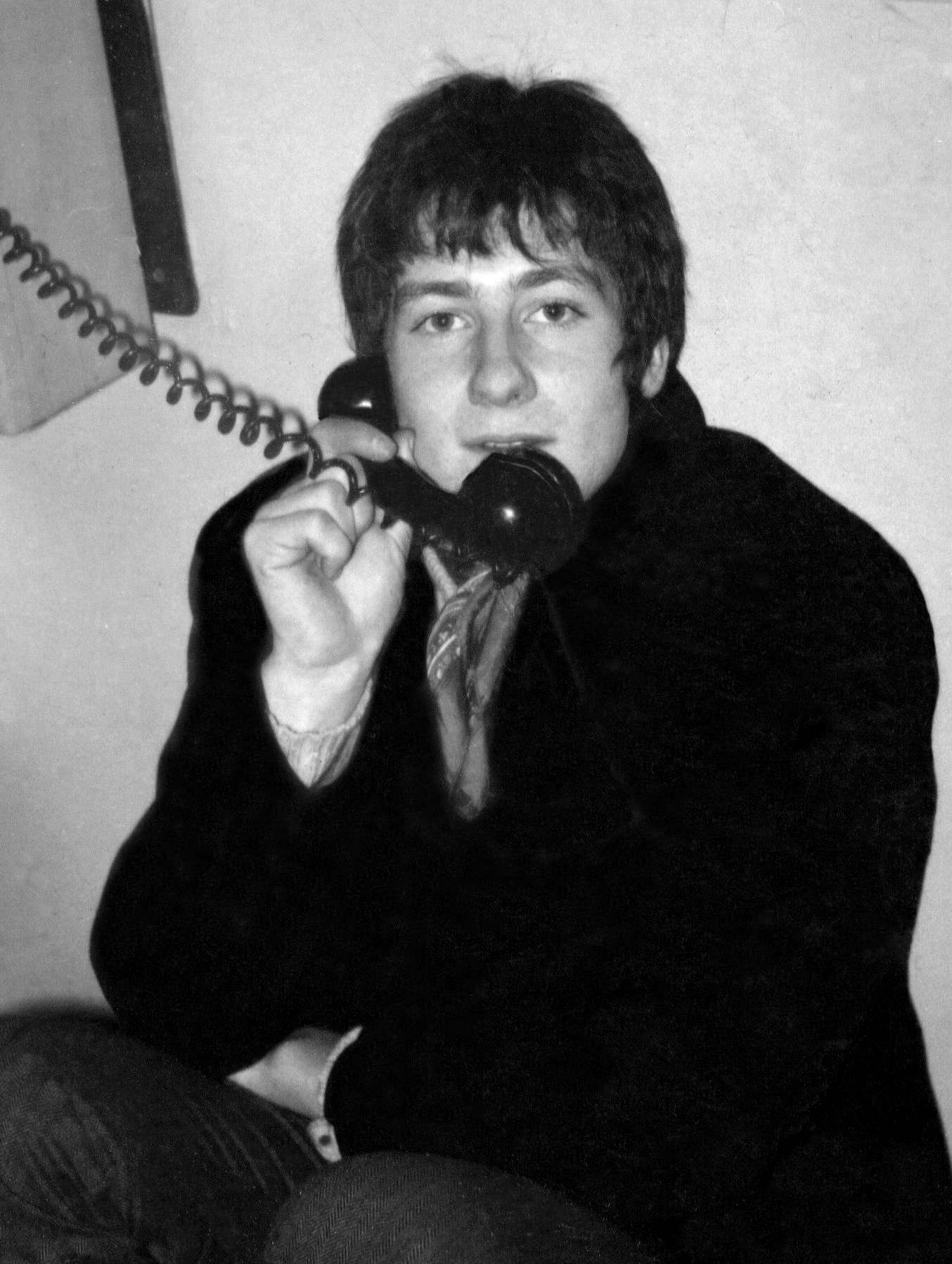
Composers Ravi Shankar (top) and George Fenton (bottom) won Best Film Theme or Song for the theme "For All Mankind" from the film Gandhi.

The 28th Ivor Novello Awards were held at the Grosvenor House, London.

Category	Recipient and nominees
Best British Musical	**Windy City – Written by Tony Macaulay and Dick Vosburgh**
Best Film Theme or Song	**"For All Mankind" s from Gandhi – Composed by Ravi Shankar and George Fenton**; "Another Brick in the Wall" – Composed by Roger Waters; Performed by Pink Floyd; "Time and Tide" from The Plague Dogs – Composed and performed by Alan Price
Best Song Musically and Lyrically	**"Have You Ever Been in Love" – Written by Andy Hill, Pete Sinfield and John Danter; Performed by Leo Sayer**; "Heartbreaker" – Written by Barry Gibb, Robin Gibb and Maurice Gibb; Performed by Dionne Warwick; "Now Those Days Are Gone" – Written by Andy Hill and Nichola Martin; Performed by Bucks Fizz
Best Theme from a TV or Radio Production	**"Theme from Harry's Game" – Composed by Pól Brennan**; Omnibus – Composed by George Fenton; Smiley's People – Composed by Patrick Gowers
Lifetime Achievement in British Music	**Vivian Ellis**
Outstanding Contribution to British Music	**Genesis (Tony Banks, Phil Collins, Peter Gabriel, Steve Hackett and Mike Rutherford)**
Songwriter of the Year	**Andy Hill**
Special Award for 25 Year in the Music Business	**The Shadows (Brian Bennett, Hank Marvin and Bruce Welch)**
The Best Pop Song	**"Our House" – Written by Carl Smyth and Chris Foreman; Performed by Madness**; "Come On Eileen" – Written by Kevin Rowland, Kevin Adams and James Paterson; Performed by Dexys Midnight Runners; "I Don't Wanna Dance" – Written and performed by Eddy Grant
The Best Selling "A" Side	**"Come On Eileen" – Written by Kevin Rowland, Kevin Adams and James Paterson; Performed by Dexys Midnight Runners**; "Do You Really Want to Hurt Me" – Written by Boy George, Michael Craig, Jon Moss and Roy Hay; Performed by Culture Club; "Ebony and Ivory" – Written by Paul McCartney
The International Hit of the Year	**"Ebony and Ivory" – Written by Paul McCartney; Performed by Paul McCartney featuring Stevie Wonder**; "Don't You Want Me" – Written by Phil Oakey, Adrian Wright and Jo Callis; Performed by The Human League; "Heartbreaker" – Written by Barry Gibb, Robin Gibb and Maurice Gibb; Performed by Dionne Warwick
The Most Performed Work	**"Golden Brown" – Written by Jean J. Burnell, Hugh Cornwell, Jet Black and David Greenfield; Performed by The Stranglers**; "Love Plus One" – Written by Nick Heyward; Performed by Haircut One Hundred; "Oh Julie" – Written and performed by Shakin' Stevens
The Outstanding British Lyric	**"Private Investigations" – Written by Mark Knopfler; Performed by Dire Straits**; "Have You Ever Been in Love" – Written by Andy Hill, Pete Sinfield and John Danter; Performed by Leo Sayer; "The Dreaming" – Written and performed by Kate Bush

=== 1984 ===
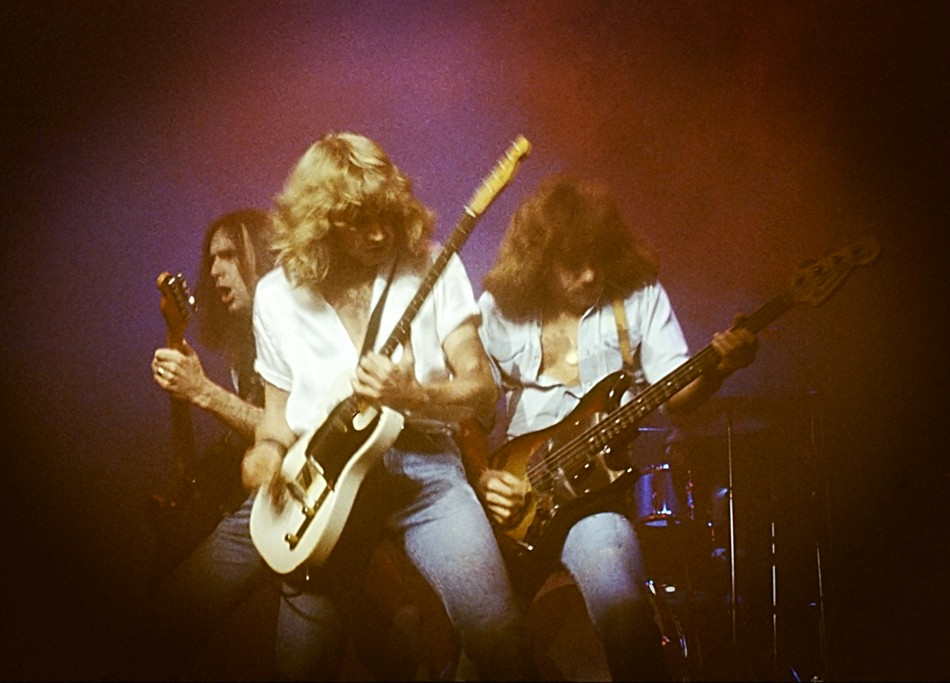
Status Quo members Andy Bown, Pete Kircher, Alan Lancaster, Rick Parfitt and Francis Rossi received the award for Outstanding Contribution to British Music.

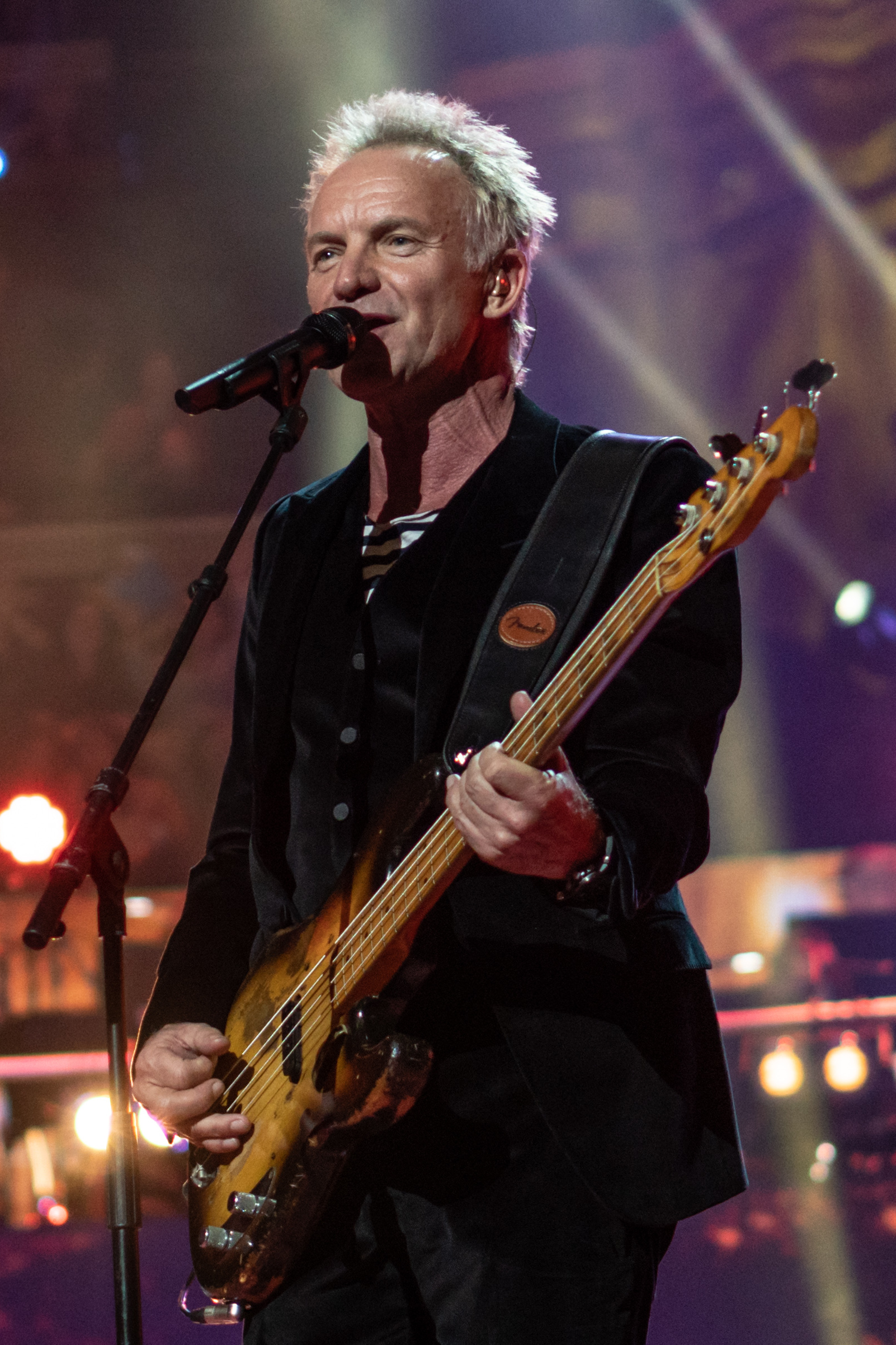
The Police frontman Sting received two awards for the song "Every Breath You Take".

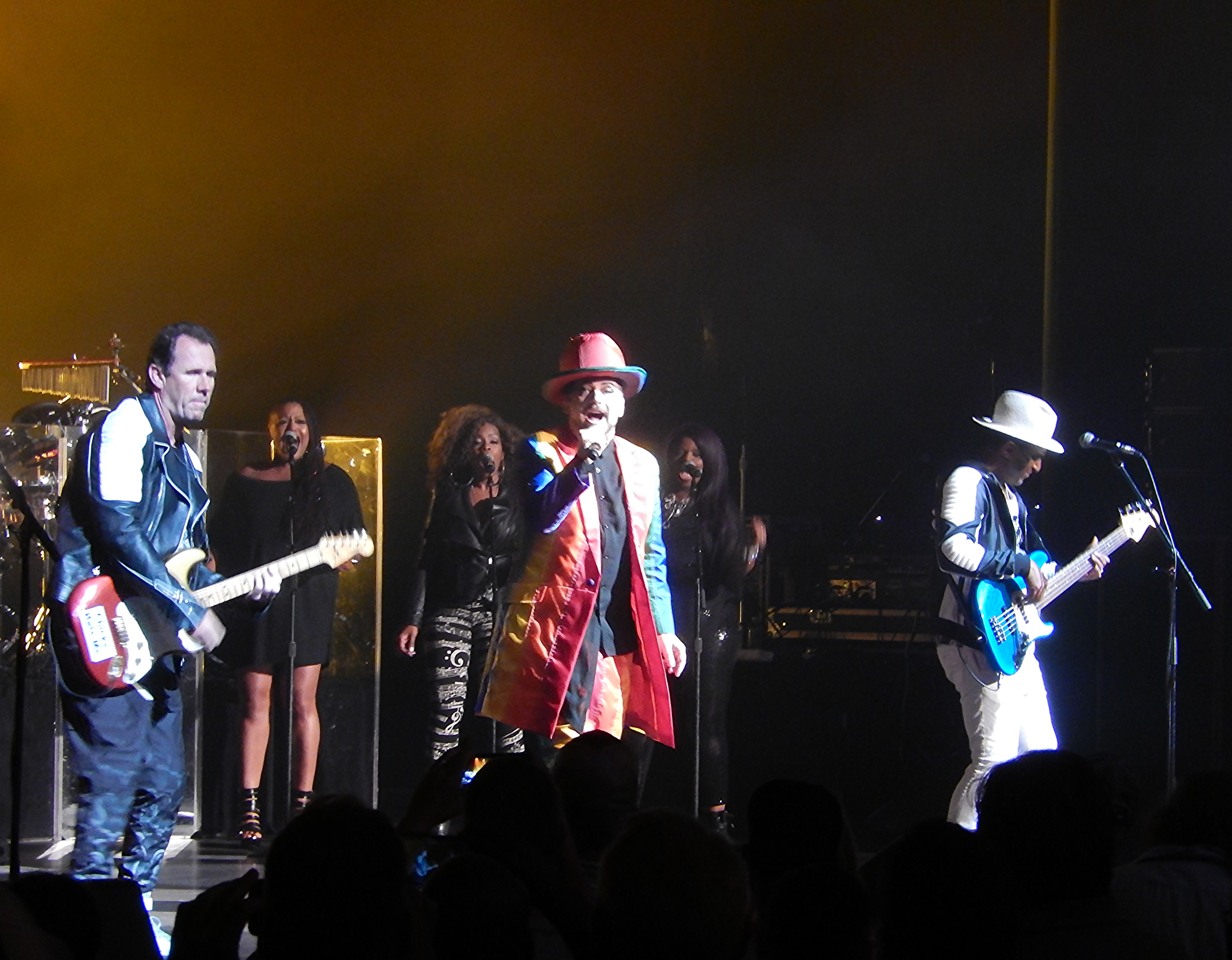
Culture Club members Boy George, Jon Moss, Michael Craig and Roy Hay won two awards with Phil Pickett for the song "Karma Chameleon".

The 29th Ivor Novello Awards were held at the Grosvenor House, London.

Category	Recipient and nominees
Outstanding Contribution to British Music	**Status Quo (Andy Bown, Pete Kircher, Alan Lancaster, Rick Parfitt and Francis Rossi)**
Best British Musical	**Blood Brothers – Written by Willie Russell**; Mr. Cinders – Written by Clifford Grey, Greatrex Newman, Leo Robin, Vivian Ellis and Richard Myers; Poppy – Written by Pete Nichols and Monty Norman
Best Film Theme or Song	**"Going Home" – Written by Mark Knopfler**; "All Time High" from Octopussy – Written by Tim Rice and John Barry; Performed by Rita Coolidge; "Walking in the Air" from The Snowman – Written by Howard Blake; Performed by Peter Auty
Best Song Musically and Lyrically	**"Every Breath You Take" – Written by Sting; Performed by The Police**; "Pipes of Peace" – Written and performed by Paul McCartney; "True" – Written by Gary Kemp; Performed by Spandau Ballet
Best Theme from a TV or Radio Production	**"That's Livin' Alright" from Auf Wiedersehen, Pet – Composed by David Mackay and Ken Ashby**; Partners in Crime – Composed by Joseph Horovitz; The Late, Late Breakfast Show – Written by Gary Kemp
Outstanding Services to British Music	**Andrew Lloyd Webber**
Songwriters of the Year	**Annie Lennox and Dave Stewart**
Best Pop Song	**"Karma Chameleon" – Written by Boy George, Jon Moss, Michael Craig, Roy Hay and Phil Pickett; Performed by Culture Club**; "Sweet Dreams (Are Made of This)" – Written by Annie Lennox and Dave Stewart; Performed by Eurythmics; "Thriller" – Written by Rod Temperton; Performed by Michael Jackson
Best Rock Song	**"Let's Dance" – Written and performed by David Bowie**; "Every Breath You Take" – Written by Sting; Performed by The Police; "Owner of a Lonely Heart" – Written by Trevor Rabin, Jon Anderson, Chris Squire and Trevor Horn; Performed by Yes
The Best Selling "A" Side	**"Karma Chameleon" – Written by Boy George, Jon Moss, Michael Craig, Roy Hay and Phil Pickett; Performed by Culture Club**; "Let's Dance" – Written and performed by David Bowie; "Only You" – Written by Vince Clarke; Performed by Yazoo
The International Hit of the Year	**"Let's Dance" – Written and performed by David Bowie**; "Every Breath You Take" – Written by Sting; Performed by The Police; "Karma Chameleon" – Written by Boy George, Jon Moss, Michael Craig, Roy Hay and Phil Pickett; Performed by Culture Club
The Most Performed Work	**"Every Breath You Take" – Written by Sting; Performed by The Police**; "Karma Chameleon" – Written by Boy George, Jon Moss, Michael Craig, Roy Hay and Phil Pickett; Performed by Culture Club; "Moonlight Shadow" – Written and performed by Mike Oldfield

=== 1985 ===
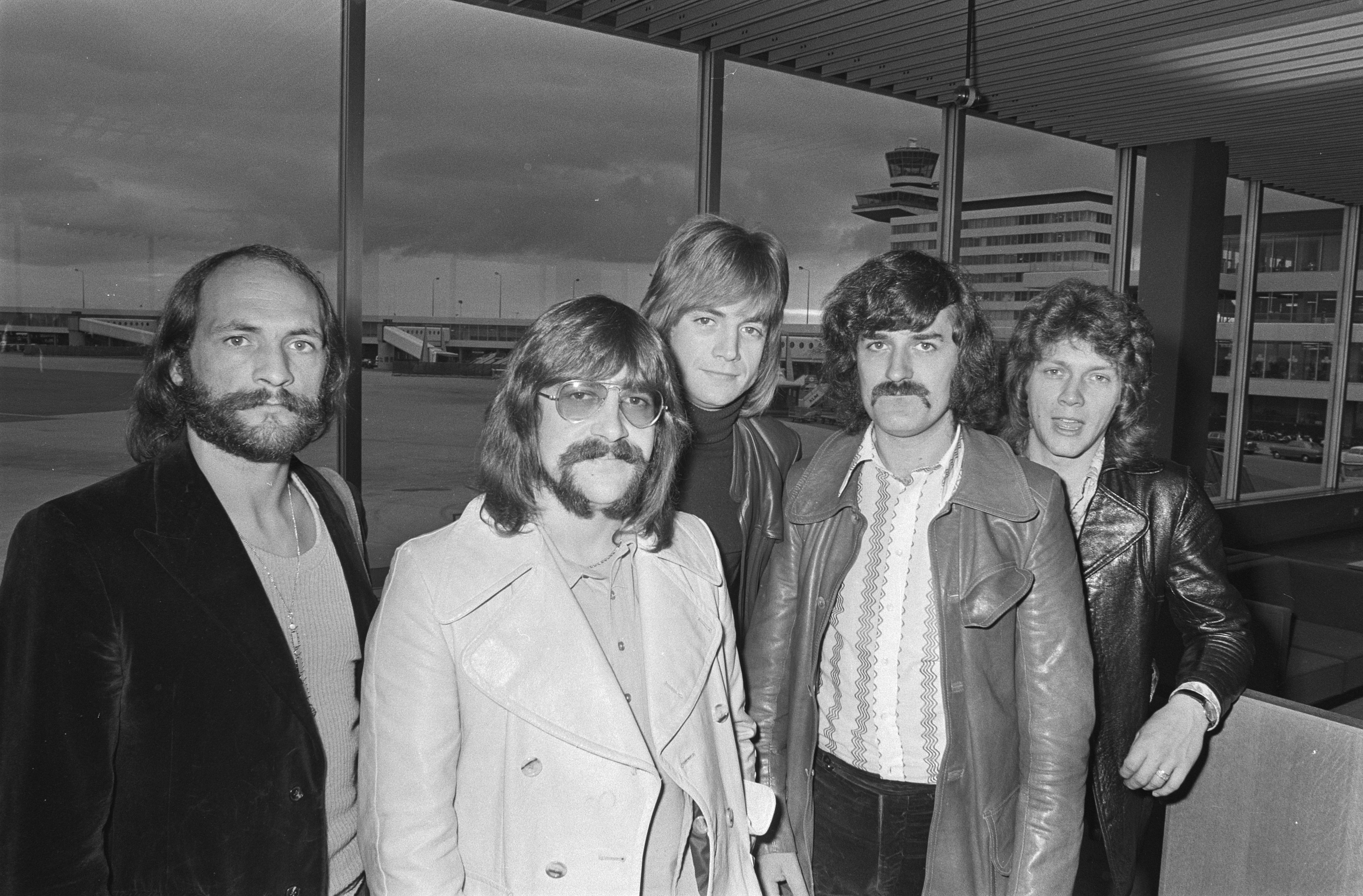
The Moody Blues members Graeme Edge, Justin Hayward, John Lodge, Patrick Moraz and Ray Thomas received the award for Outstanding Contribution to British Music.

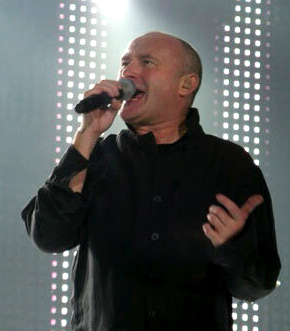
English singer Phil Collins won Best Song Musically and Lyrically for the song "Against All Odds (Take a Look at Me Now)".

The 30th Ivor Novello Awards were held at the Grosvenor House Hotel, London.

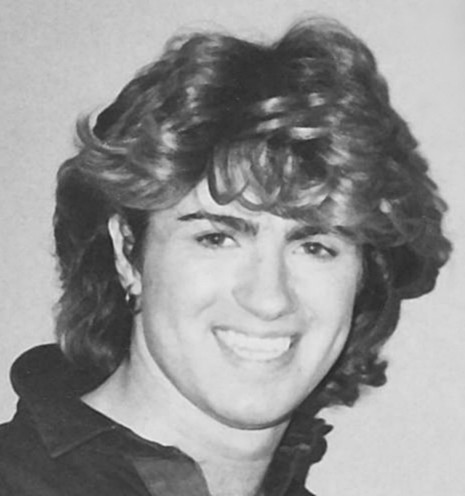
English singer George Michael won songwriter of the year.

Category	Recipient and nominees; Performed by Culture Club
Best British Musical	**The Hired Man – Words and Music by Howard Goodall**; Starlight Express – Written by Andrew Lloyd Webber and Richard Stilgoe; The Boyfriend – Written by Sandy Wilson
Best Contemporary Song	**"Two Tribes" – Written by Holly Johnson, Peter Gill and Mark O'Toole; Performed by Frankie Goes to Hollywood**; "I Won't Let the Sun Go Down on Me" – Written and performed by Nik Kershaw; "Relax" – Written by Holly Johnson, Peter Gill and Mark O'Toole; Performed by Frankie Goes to Hollywood
Best Film Theme or Song	**"We All Stand Together" from Rupert and the Frog Song – Written by Paul McCartney**; Champions – Written by Carl Davis; The Company of Wolves – Written by George Fenton
Best Song Musically and Lyrically	**"Against All Odds (Take a Look at Me Now)" – Written and performed by Phil Collins**; "Careless Whisper" – Written by George Michael and Andrew Ridgeley; Performed by George Michael; "I Should Have Known Better" – Written by Jim Diamond and Graham Lyle; Performed by Jim Diamond
Best Theme from a Radio or TV Production	**The Jewel in the Crown – Written by George Fenton**; Another Six English Towns – Written by Jim Parker; Kennedy – Written by Richard Hartley
Outstanding Contribution to British Music	**The Moody Blues (Graeme Edge, Justin Hayward, John Lodge, Patrick Moraz and Ray Thomas)**
Outstanding Services to British Music	**Michael Tippett**
Songwriter of the Year	**George Michael**
The Best Selling "A" Side	**"Do They Know It's Christmas?" – Written by Bob Geldof and Midge Ure; Performed by Band Aid**
The International Hit of the Year	**"The Reflex" – Written by Simon Le Bon, John Taylor, Roger Taylor, Andy Taylor and Nick Rhodes; Performed by Duran Duran**; "Caribbean Queen (No More Love on the Run)" – Written by Billy Ocean and Keith Diamond; Performed by Billy Ocean; "Wake Me Up Before You Go-Go" – Written by George Michael; Performed by Wham!
The Jimmy Kennedy Award	**Tommie Connor**
The Most Performed Work	**"Careless Whisper" – Written by George Michael and Andrew Ridgeley; Performed by George Michael**; "I Won't Let the Sun Go Down on Me" – Written and performed by Nik Kershaw; "Two Tribes" – Written by Holly Johnson, Peter Gill and Mark O'Toole; Performed by Frankie Goes to Hollywood

=== 1986 ===
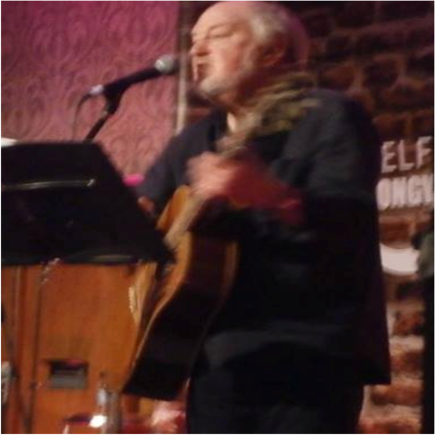
Graham Lyle won two awards alongside Terry Britten for the song "We Don't Need Another Hero".

The 31st Ivor Novello Awards were held at the Grosvenor House, London.

Category	Recipient and nominees
Best British Musical	**Me and My Girl – Written by Reginald Armitage and Douglas Furber**; Lennon – Written by John Lennon and Paul McCartney; Mutiny! – Written by David Essex and Richard Crane
Best Contemporary Song	**"We Don't Need Another Hero" – Written by Graham Lyle and Terry Britten; Performed by Tina Turner**; "19" – Written by Paul Hardcastle, Mike Oldfield, Bill Couturie and Jonas McCord; Performed by Paul Hardcastle; "Money for Nothing" – Written by Mark Knopfler and Sting; Performed by Dire Straits; "Running Up That Hill" – Written and performed by Kate Bush
Best Film Theme or Song	**"We Don't Need Another Hero" from Mad Max Beyond Thunderdome – Written by Graham Lyle and Terry Britten; Performed by Tina Turner**; "A View to a Kill" from the film of the same name – Written by Duran Duran and John Barry; Performed by Duran Duran; "Hit That Perfect Beat" – Written by John Foster, Steve Bronski and Larry Steinbachek; Performed by Bronski Beat
Best Song Musically and Lyrically	**"Nikita" – Written by Elton John and Bernie Taupin; Performed by Elton John**; "Everybody Wants to Rule the World" – Written by Roland Orzabal, Ian Stanley and Chris Hughes; Performed by Tears for Fears; "I Know Him So Well" – Written by Tim Rice, Björn Ulvaeus and Benny Andersson; Performed by Elaine Paige and Barbara Dickson; "I Want to Know What Love Is" – Written by Mick Jones; Performed by Foreigner
Best Theme from a Radio or TV Production	**Edge of Darkness – Written by Eric Clapton and Michael Kamen**; EastEnders – Written by Leslie Osborne and Simon May; The Last Place on Earth – Written by Trevor Jones
Outstanding Contribution to British Music	**Elton John**
Outstanding Services to British Music	**Malcolm Arnold**
Songwriter of the Year	**Roland Orzabal**
The Best Selling "A" Side	**"I Know Him So Well" – Written by Tim Rice, Björn Ulvaeus and Benny Andersson**; "19" – Written by Paul Hardcastle, Mike Oldfield, Bill Couturie and Jonas McCord; Performed by Paul Hardcastle; "Easy Lover" – Written by Phil Collins, Philip Bailey and Nathan East; Performed by Philip Bailey and Phil Collins
The International Hit of the Year	**"19" – Written by Paul Hardcastle, Mike Oldfield, Bill Couturie and Jonas McCord; Performed by Paul Hardcastle**; "A View to a Kill" – Written by Duran Duran and John Barry; Performed by Duran Duran; "Shout" – Written by Roland Orzabal and Ian Stanley; Performed by Tears for Fears
The Jimmy Kennedy Award	**Lionel Bart**
Most Performed Work	**"Easy Lover" – Written by Phil Collins, Philip Bailey and Nathan East; Performed by Philip Bailey and Phil Collins**

=== 1987 ===
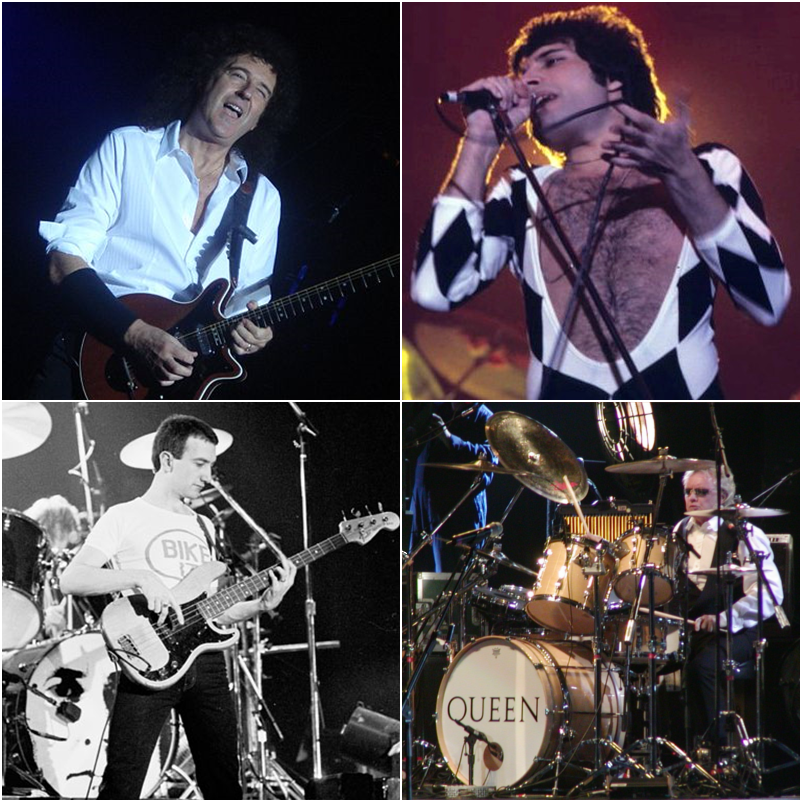
Queen members Brian May, Freddie Mercury, John Deacon and Roger Taylor received the award for Outstanding Contribution to British Music.

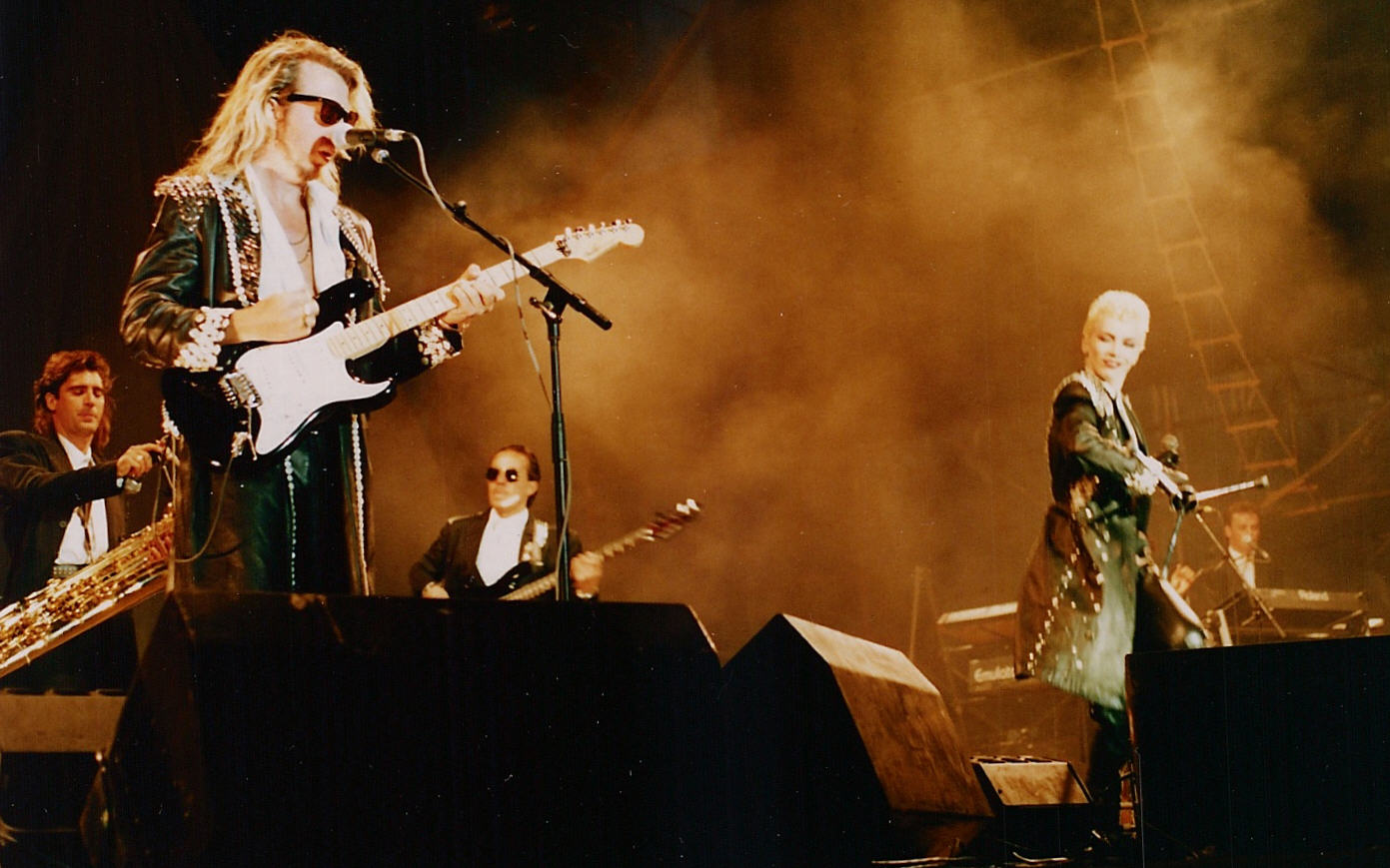
Eurythmics members Dave Stewart (left) and Annie Lennox (right) won two awards, Outstanding Contemporary Song and Songwriters of the Year.

The 32nd Ivor Novello Awards were held on April 15, 1987, at the Grosvenor House, London.

Category	Recipient and nominees
Best British Musical	**The Phantom of the Opera – Written by Charles Hart, Andrew Lloyd Webber and Richard Stilgoe**; Charlie Girl – Written by David Heneker and John Taylor; Chess – Written by Tim Rice, Björn Ulvaeus and Benny Andersson
Best Contemporary Song	**"It's Alright (Baby's Coming Back)" – Written by Annie Lennox and Dave Stewart; Performed by Eurythmics**; "Sledgehammer" – Written and performed by Peter Gabriel; "West End Girls" – Written by Neil Tennant and Chris Lowe; Performed by Pet Shop Boys
Best Film Theme or Song	**"Sweet Freedom" from Running Scared – Written by Rod Temperton; Performed by Michael McDonald**; "A Kind of Magic" from Highlander – Written by Roger Taylor, Performed by Queen; "In Too Deep" from Mona Lisa – Written by Tony Banks, Phil Collins and Mike Rutherford; Performed by Genesis
Best Song Musically and Lyrically	**"Don't Give Up" – Written by Peter Gabriel; Performed by Peter Gabriel and Kate Bush**; "All I Ask of You" – Written by Charles Hart, Andrew Lloyd Webber and Richard Stilgoe; Performed by Cliff Richard and Sarah Brightman; "The Miracle of Love" – Written by Annie Lennox and Dave Stewart; Performed by Eurythmics
Best Theme from a TV or Radio Production	**The Monocled Mutineer – Written by George Fenton**; Theme from Lost Empires – Written by Derek Hilton; "Time After Time" – Written by Rod Argent and Robert Howes
Outstanding Contribution to British Music	**Queen (Brian May, Freddie Mercury, John Deacon and Roger Taylor)**
Outstanding Services to British Music	**Yehudi Menuhin**
Songwriters of the Year	**Annie Lennox and Dave Stewart**
The Best Selling "A" Side	**"Every Loser Wins" – Written by Simon May, Stewart James and Bradley James; Performed by Nick Berry**; "Chain Reaction" – Written by Barry Gibb, Maurice Gibb and Robin Gibb; Performed by Diana Ross; "Living Doll" – Written by Lionel Bart; Performed by Cliff Richard and The Shadows
The International Hit of the Year	**"West End Girls" – Written by Neil Tennant and Chris Lowe; Performed by Pet Shop Boys**; "Nikita" – Written by Elton John and Bernie Taupin; Performed by Elton John; "The Edge of Heaven" – Written by George Michael; Performed by Wham!
The Jimmy Kennedy Award	**Hugh Charles**
The Most Performed Work	**"Chain Reaction" – Written by Barry Gibb, Maurice Gibb and Robin Gibb; Performed by Diana Ross**

=== 1988 ===
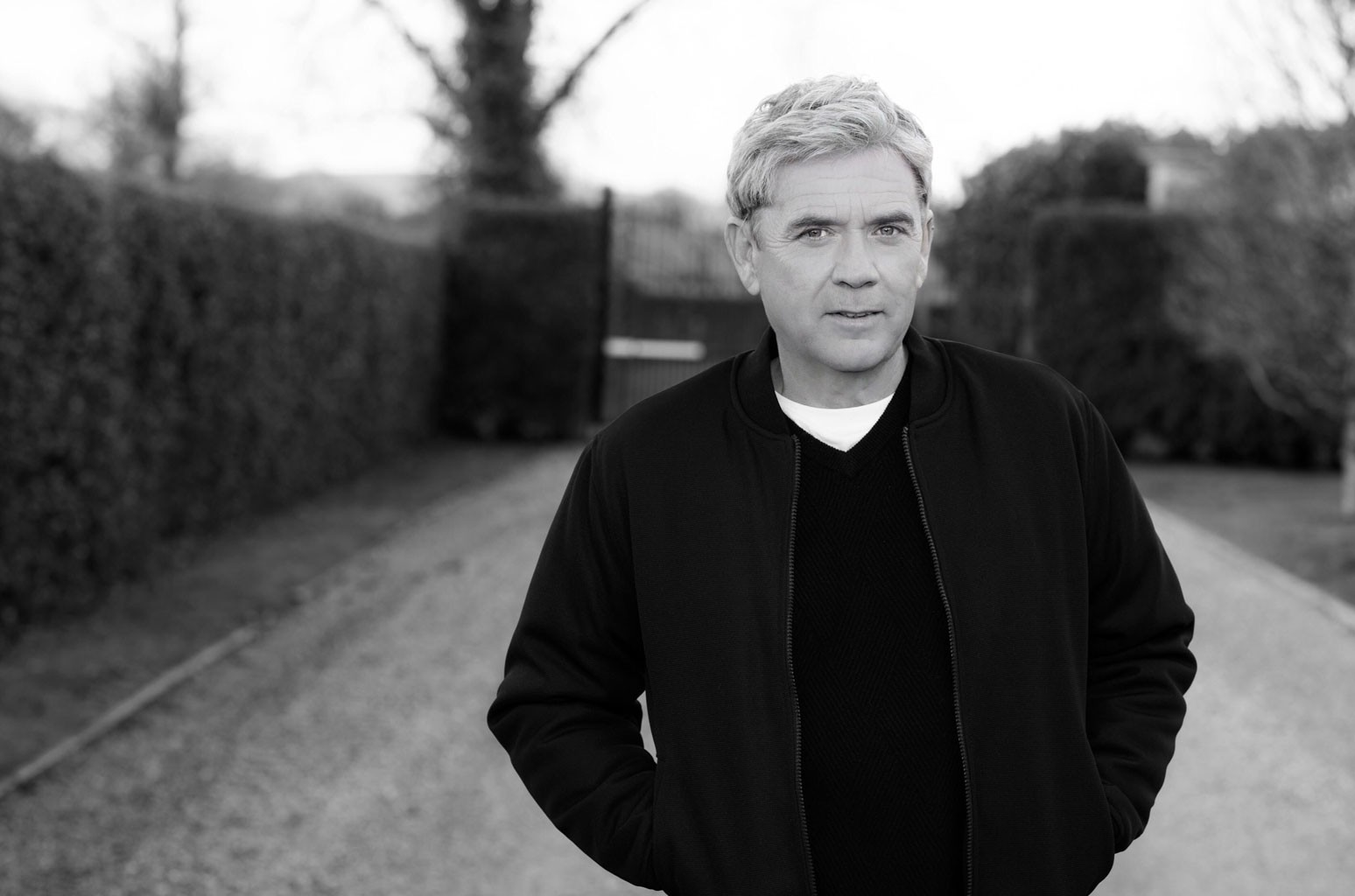

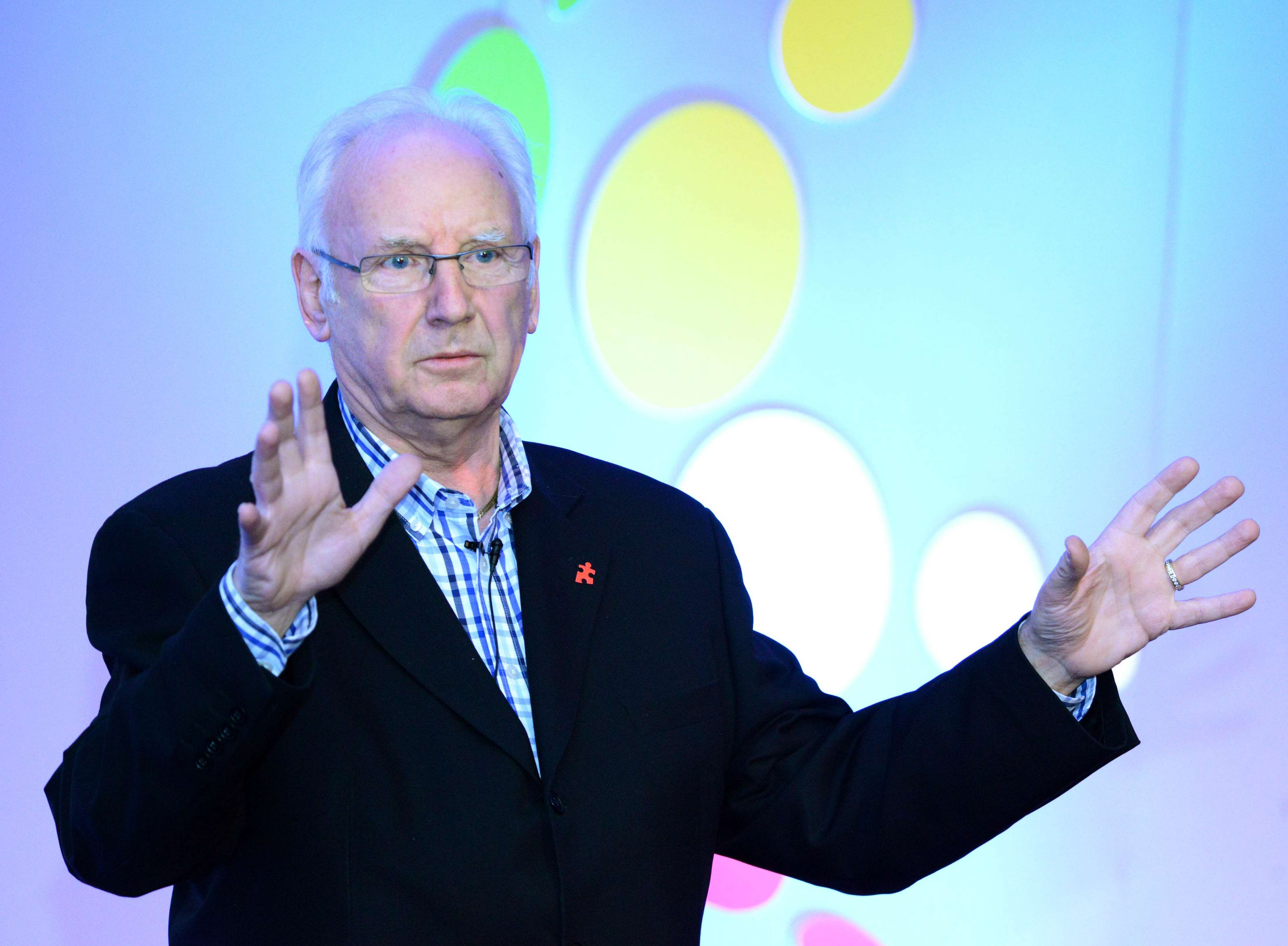
Mike Stock (top) and Pete Waterman (bottom) won three awards alongside Matt Aitken, including Songwriters of the Year, all of them for Rick Astley's "Never Gonna Give You Up".

The 33rd Ivor Novello Awards held on April 7, 1988, at the Grosvenor House, London.

Category	Recipient and nominees
Best Contemporary Song	**"You Win Again" – Written by Barry Gibb, Robin Gibb and Maurice Gibb; Performed by Bee Gees**; "Never Gonna Give You Up" – Written by Mike Stock, Matt Aitken and Pete Waterman; Performed by Rick Astley; "What Have I Done to Deserve This?" from the film of the same name – Written by Chris Lowe, Neil Tennant and Allee Willis; Performed by Pet Shop Boys with Dusty Springfield
Best Film Score Theme or Song	**Cry Freedom – Written by George Fenton and Jonas Gwangwa**; "The Living Daylights" – Written by John Barry and Pål Waaktaar, Performed by A-ha; Theme from Castaway – Written by Stanley Myers
Best Song Musically and Lyrically	**"(Something Inside) So Strong" – Written and performed by Labi Siffre**; "I Knew You Were Waiting (For Me)" – Written by Simon Climie and Dennis Morgan; Performed by Aretha Franklin and George Michael; "Throwing It All Away" – Written by Tony Banks, Phil Collins and Michael Rutherford; Performed by Genesis
Best Theme from a TV or Radio Production	**Fortunes of War – Written by Richard Holmes**; My Family and Other Animals – Written by Daryl Runswick; "Neighbours" – Written by Tony Hatch and Jackie Trent
Outstanding Contribution to British Music	**Bee Gees (Barry Gibb, Maurice Gibb and Robin Gibb)**
Outstanding Services to British Music	**David Heneker**
Songwriters of the Year	**Mike Stock, Matt Aitken and Pete Waterman**
The Best Selling "A" Side	**"Never Gonna Give You Up" – Written by Mike Stock, Matt Aitken and Pete Waterman; Performed by Rick Astley**; "China in Your Hand" – Written by Carol Decker and Ronald Rogers; Performed by T'Pau; "You Win Again" – Written by Barry Gibb, Robin Gibb and Maurice Gibb; Performed by Bee Gees
The International Hit of the Year	**"It's a Sin" – Written by Chris Lowe and Neil Tennant; Performed by Pet Shop Boys**; "I Knew You Were Waiting (For Me)" – Written by Simon Climie and Dennis Morgan; Performed by Aretha Franklin and George Michael; "Never Gonna Give You Up" – Written by Mike Stock, Matt Aitken and Pete Waterman; Performed by Rick Astley
The Jimmy Kennedy Award	**Norman Newell**
The Most Performed Work	**"Never Gonna Give You Up" – Written by Mike Stock, Matt Aitken and Pete Waterman; Performed by Rick Astley**; "Living in a Box" – Written by Marcus Vere and Steve Pigott; Performed by Living in a Box; "Respectable" – Written by Mike Stock, Matt Aitken and Pete Waterman; Performed by Mel and Kim

=== 1989 ===
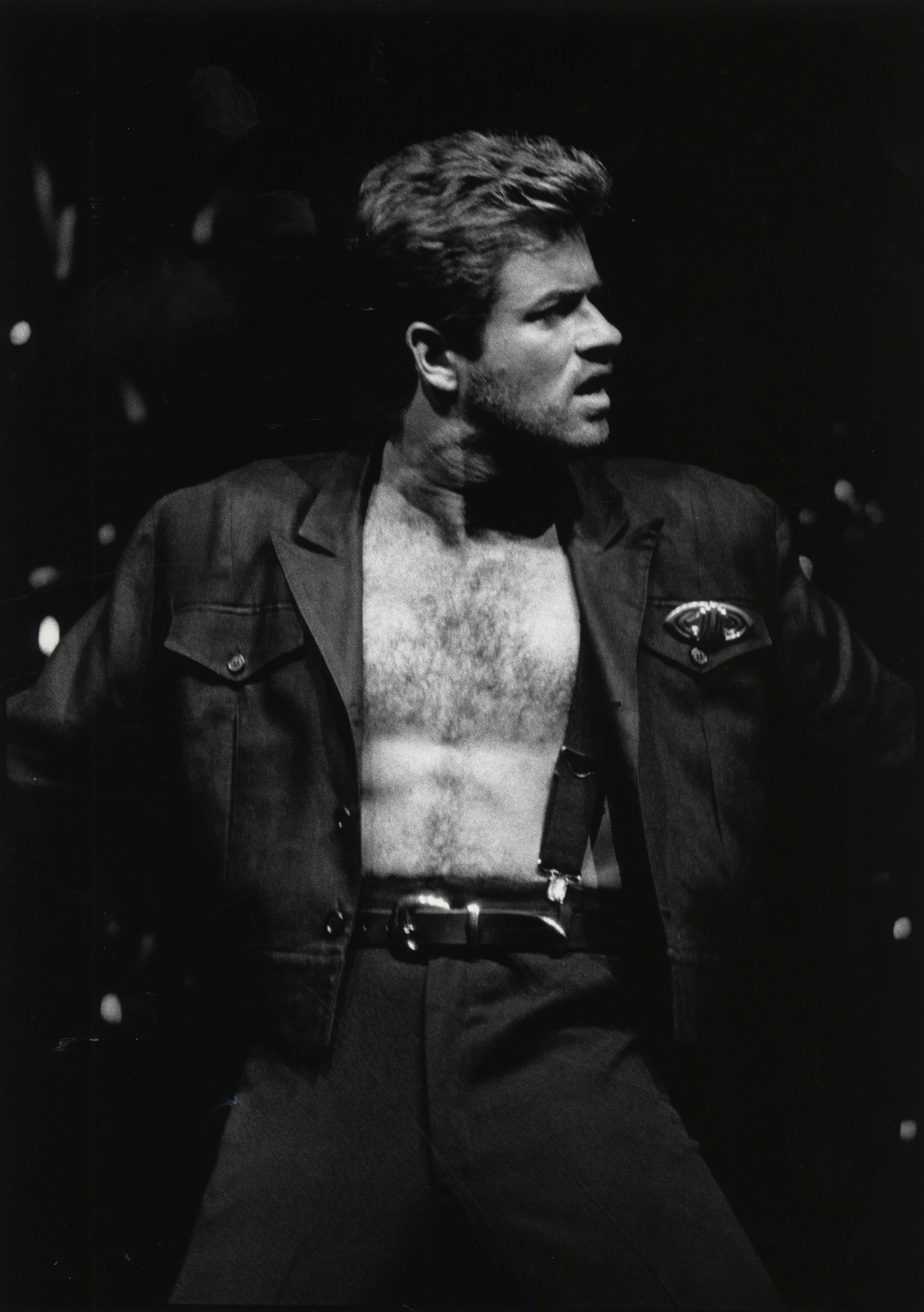
British singer George Michael received two awards, International Hit of the Year and Songwriter of the Year, the latter shared with the songwriting trio Stock Aitken Waterman.

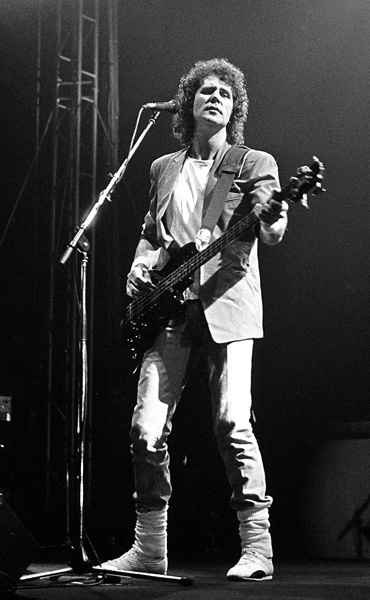
John Illsley received the award for Outstanding Contribution to British Music alongside Mark Knopfler.

The 34th Ivor Nvello Awards were presented on April 4, 1989, at the Grosvenor House, London.

Category	Recipient and nominees
Best Contemporary Song	**"Love Changes (Everything)" – Written by Simon Climie, Dennis Morgan and Rob Fisher; Performed by Climie Fisher**; "A Little Respect" – Written by Andy Bell and Vince Clarke; Performed by Erasure; "Father Figure" – Written and performed by George Michael
Best Film Theme or Song	**"Two Hearts" from Buster – Written by Phil Collins and Lamont Dozier; Performed by Phil Collins**; A Fish Called Wanda – Written by John Du Prez; "Childhood Days" from Hawks – Written by Barry Gibb and Maurice Gibb
Best Song Musically and Lyrically	**"They Dance Alone" – Written and performed by Sting**; "Mary's Prayer" – Written by Gary Clark; Performed by Danny Wilson; "Perfect" – Written by Mark Nevin; Performed by Fairground Attraction
Best Theme from a TV or Radio Production	**Testament – Written by Nigel Hess**; The Long March – Written by Christopher Gunning
Lifetime Achievement	**Cliff Richard**
Outstanding Contribution to British Music	**Mark Knopfler and John Illsley**
Outstanding Services to British Music	**Paul McCartney**
Songwriters of the Year	**George Michael**; **Mike Stock, Matt Aitken and Pete Waterman**
The Best Selling "A" Side	**"Mistletoe and Wine" – Written by Leslie Stewart, Jeremy Paul and Keith Strachan; Performed by Cliff Richard**; "Especially for You" – Written by Mike Stock, Matt Aitken and Pete Waterman; Performed by Kylie Minogue and Jason Donovan; "I Should Be So Lucky" – Written by Mike Stock, Matt Aitken and Pete Waterman
The International Hit of the Year	**"Faith" – Written and performed by George Michael**; "Get Outta My Dreams, Get into My Car" – Written by Billy Ocean and Robert John "Mutt" Lange; "I Should Be So Lucky" – Written by Mike Stock, Matt Aitken and Pete Waterman; Performed by Kylie Minogue
The Jimmy Kennedy Award	**Leslie Bricusse**
The Most Performed Work	**"I Should Be So Lucky" – Written by Mike Stock, Matt Aitken and Pete Waterman; Performed by Kylie Minogue**; "Get Outta My Dreams, Get into My Car" – Written by Billy Ocean and Robert John "Mutt" Lange; Performed by Billy Ocean; "Love Changes (Everything)" – Written by Simon Climie, Dennis Morgan and Rob Fisher; Performed by Climie Fisher
