= Jubilee Gardens =

Jubilee Gardens may refer to:

- Jubilee Gardens, Barnes
- Jubilee Gardens, Ely
- Jubilee Gardens, Lambeth
- Jubilee Gardens, Twickenham, a playground
- Jubilee Garden (Hong Kong), a housing estate
- Jubilee Garden, a park in Rajkot, India
