= Don Barry =

Donald or Don Barry may refer to:

- Donald Barry (screenwriter) (1908–1969), American film and TV scenarist, a.k.a D. D. Beauchamp
- Don "Red" Barry (1912–1980), American film and television actor, a/k/a Donald Barry
- Don Barry (Canadian football) (1931–2014), center inducted into Alberta Sports Hall of Fame
- Donald T. Barry (1928–2017), American politician, member of the Illinois House of Representatives
- Donald Barry Clarke (1933–2002), New Zealand rugby union fullback, a/k/a Don Clarke
- Don Barry Mason (1950–2006), English founder of Psychedelic Shamanistic Institute (PSI)
