= Barry Mason (sculptor) =

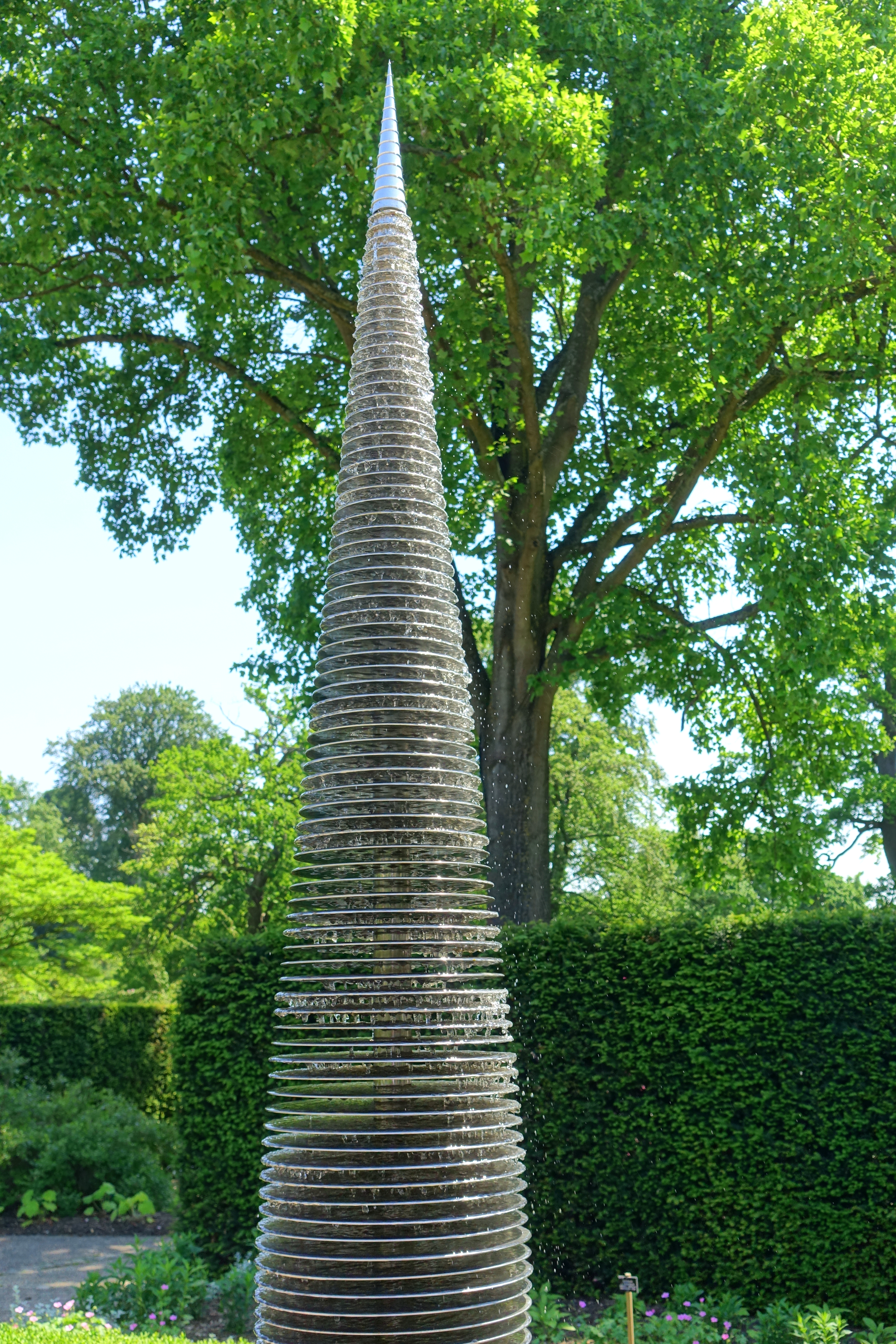
Thales in Savill Garden

Barry Mason FRBS (born 1952, Epsom, Surrey, England) is a British sculptor who specialises in sculpture using water and light and now also works with sound.

== Biography ==
Mason studied fine art at Reading University (1970–74) and at the Slade, University College London (1974–76). He acquired the skills to realise many of these pieces by studying stonemasonry at Bath Technical College (1980–81), where he gained the City and Guilds Advanced Craft qualification in stonemasonry. This also enabled him to support his sculpture practice by part-time work as a stonemason. He lives and works in Gloucestershire.

== Works ==
He has completed several large pieces, which are accessible to the public, as well as many more in private collections in Britain and abroad. These include THALES, commissioned by the Crown Estate and presented to Queen Elizabeth II as the centrepiece of the Jubilee Garden in the Savill Garden in Windsor Great Park; HALF MOON in the grounds of Eton College; and SPHERE at the Hurlingham Club in London. His earliest large sculptures were conceived to be installed in landscapes rather than art-gallery settings, and used sunlight and shadow as an integral and dynamic element in their composition (the HELIOS series).

Most of Mason's recent work has been commissioned privately for gardens in England, Scotland, Spain and Germany. Highlights include VESSICA in a gold medal-winning garden at Chelsea Flower Show, designed by Mark Anthony Walker. Recent sculpture installations include two large pieces for the Mayfield Garden in Oberon, Australia, to be opened in February 2026.

Mason has always had a parallel passion for music, and discovered the world of the gong, sound therapy and healing about fifteen years ago. He has been fortunate to collaborate with several leading gong practitioners, playing handpan and other percussion instruments alongside the gongs. Over the last decade, a few experimental sound sculptures have been produced using wind and water, but more recently Mason has been making gongs and other instruments specifically designed for use in sound therapy. Early gongs were made from stainless steel, brass and copper, but a fortunate encounter with a titanium gong in 2020 set the path for future experiments. His latest generation of large titanium gongs has found homes with sound practitioners around the world, including in Hawaii, Hong Kong and the USA.
