= Ivor Novello Awards =

Annual British awards for songwriting and composing

The Ivor Novello Awards
- Awarded for: Honouring Excellence in Music Writing
- Location: London
- Country: United Kingdom
- Presented by: The Ivors Academy
- First award: 1955; 71 years ago
- Website: ivorsacademy.com/awards/

The Ivor Novello Awards, named after the Welsh entertainer Ivor Novello, are awards for songwriting and composing. They have been presented annually in London by the Ivors Academy, formerly called the British Academy of Songwriters, Composers, and Authors, since 1956.

== Awards ==
The awards are presented at two annual ceremonies known as the Ivors and the Ivors Composer Awards.

- The Ivors take place each May and, as of 2020, are sponsored by Apple Music. They are recognised worldwide as the major platform for recognising and rewarding Britain and Ireland's songwriting and composing talents. The Ivors remain the only award ceremony in the musical calendar that is not influenced by publishers and record companies, but judged and presented by the writing community.
- The Ivors Composer Awards take place each December and are sponsored by PRS for Music. They are broadcast by BBC Radio 3.

The award itself is a solid bronze sculpture of Euterpe, the muse of lyric poetry. It was designed in 1955 by Hazel Underwood.

== Award categories ==
=== Nominated annual awards ===
- Best Song Musically and Lyrically
- Best Contemporary Song
- Album Award
- Best Original Film Score
- Best Television Soundtrack
- Best Original Video Game Score

=== Other annual awards ===
- Songwriter of the Year
- Most Performed Work

=== Other awards ===
- Jazz Award
- Classical Music Award
- Inspiration Award
- Outstanding Song Collection
- Outstanding Contribution to British Music
- Lifetime Achievement
- Special International Award
- BASCA Fellowship
- Best Dance Single Award
- International Hit of the Year
- International Achievement in Musical Theater
- Jimmy Kennedy Award
- PRS for Music Special International Award
- Best Selling UK Single
- Best Original Music for a Television/Radio Broadcast
- Special Award for Songwriting

== Trivia ==
- In 1964, John Lennon and Paul McCartney received four nominations for Ivors, including two nominations in the same category (as writers of both of the two songs competing for Highest British Sales of 1963), and were also given a Special Award for Outstanding Services to British Music.
- Lynsey de Paul became the first woman to receive an Ivor Award for "Won't Somebody Dance with Me" (The Best Ballad or Romantic Song) in 1974 and she went on to win another Ivor a year later for her TV theme song "No Honestly".
- In 1976, 10cc musicians Graham Gouldman and Eric Stewart achieved three awards for writing "I'm Not in Love" when it won them the Ivors for Most Performed British Work, for Best Pop Song, and for International Hit of the Year.
- In 2008, Amy Winehouse received three nominations for Ivors, including two nominations in the same category (for Best Song Musically & Lyrically).
- In 2010, an Ivor was awarded for the first time to a video game soundtrack, the PS3 title, Killzone 2, composed by Joris de Man.

== See also ==
- List of Ivor Novello Award winners and nominees (1950s–1960s)
- List of Ivor Novello Award winners and nominees (1970s–1980s)
- List of Ivor Novello Award winners and nominees (1990s–2000s)
- List of Ivor Novello Award winners and nominees (2010s–2020s)
