= Barry Mason (musician) =

British lutenist and guitarist (1947–2020)

Barry Mason (1947–2020) was a British lutenist and guitarist. He studied classical guitar at the Royal Academy of Music in London, then, focussing on Early Music, continued his studies with the lutenist Diana Poulton. In 1974 he became a director of the first Early Music Centre, also becoming a director of the early-music group Camerata of London.

In 1991, Mason—together with his wife, the singer Glenda Simpson—founded and directed the first International Classical Guitar Festival of Great Britain. He went on to direct the first ten festivals there.

In 1998, Mason bought the Spanish Guitar Centre in London—originally founded in 1952 by Len Williams, father of John Williams, bringing the business back to life. He sold the Centre in 2008.

Over the years, Mason made many recordings, as a soloist, as accompanist to his wife, and as a member of the Camerata. A selection of these is presented below.

He died on April 14, 2020, from complications of Alzheimer’s disease.

== Recordings ==
=== With the Camerata of London ===
- 1977 The Muses’ Garden For Delights
- 1978 Music of Thomas Campion
- 1978 Music for Kings And Courtiers
- 1979 The Queen’s Men
- 1980 English Ayres And Duets

=== With Glenda Simpson ===
- 1991 Now, What Is Love?

=== As a soloist ===
- 1990 Masters of the Baroque Guitar

== Articles ==
- Interview (1985), by Paul Magnussen
