= Camerata of London =

Camerata of London is a modern-instrument chamber orchestra with a repertoire ranging from the early Baroque to the contemporary music.

Camerata of London has performed in London venues including Queen Elizabeth Hall, St John's, Smith Square, St Martin-in-the-Fields, St. James's Church, Piccadilly, Fairfield Halls, and in community halls and churches throughout the Southeast of England.
