= Jubilee Garden =

The Jubilee Garden is a large, open park big area in the center of Rajkot city, Gujarati, India.
