= Don Barry Mason =

English drug researcher (1950–2006)

- Mason in 2006
- Born: 1950; Huddersfield, West Yorkshire, England
- Died: 2006 (aged 55–56)
- Occupation: Drug researcher
- Spouses: Virginia Lee; Ginny Mason (m. 1980)
- Children: 3

Don Barry Mason (1950–2006) was an English drug researcher who founded of the Psychedelic Shamanistic Institute (PSI), a networking organisation that encouraged ethnobotany and scientific research into cannabis and other psychoactive plants while contributing substantially to the public debate about drug policy reform.

== Early life ==
Mason was born into a prominent theatrical family in Huddersfield, West Yorkshire, England. His father was Frank Mason, & his grandfather was also Frank Mason he was the understudy and stand-in for the actor and comedian, George Formby, who was a childhood friend. Frank's brother was Cecil Mason a journalist at the Wigan Observer, he can be seen in photos overhearing a conversation from The Prince of Wales (later Edward Vlll) His son was 2nd cousin to Barry, also named Barry Mason, the popular songwriter who wrote the massive hit, “Delilah,” for Tom Jones.

Although he was tempted to follow the family tradition, Mason accepted paternal advice and was swiftly appointed as a trainee stockbroker in the Manchester Stock Exchange where he worked as a financial researcher into securities and investments. However, after demonstrating considerable promise for the profession, Mason tired of the pretensions of the financial marketplace with its tedious culture of profits and its boring spread-sheet analysis of the world, and he yearned for a return to his cultural roots in the arts and letters.

== Drug reform campaigner ==
As the head of PSI, Mason carried the torch for drug policy reform through a series of public appearances and televised debates and documentaries on drugs and their impact on society. Mason was a steadfast defender of the principle of cognitive liberty, and he made public statements in defence of the freedom of speech. When his friend, Michael Marlow, was charged with incitement for publishing a cannabis manual, Mason defended him by stating, “Here we are at the end of the millennium, and we are burning books. I said to the police, "What are you trying to do - force us to go into organised crime?"

== Antiquarian bookselling ==
After his marriage to Virginia Lee, Mason worked to support his young family in a variety of capacities in the Manchester area before finding his profession as an antiquarian bookseller. With the uncanny knack of the bookselling professional to assess the importance of a book or a private library at a single glance, Mason became a recognised specialist in the esoteric scientific texts published during the psychedelic era.

== Research and publishing ==
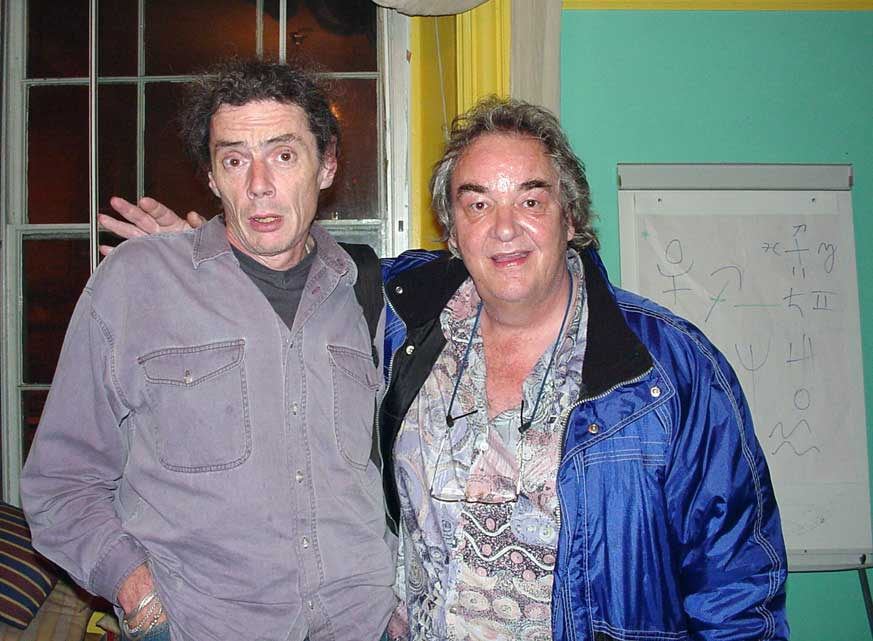
Mason with ethnobotanist Jonathan Ott.

In the 1990s, Mason met and studied with the author and scholar, Terence McKenna. Mason intensively studied the work of Jonathan Ott, the ethnobotanist, whom he knew personally.

Mason knew and frequently met with many experts and academics in the fields of ethnobotany, archaeology and psychopharmacology. In Oxford, Mason met the Professor of Archaeology Andrew Sherratt and the anthropologist, Marlene Dobkin de Rios.

In the late 1990s, Mason worked with the author, Brian Barritt, a colleague of Timothy Leary. In 1998, Mason published Barritt's autobiographical psychedelic odyssey, The Road of Excess, to critical acclaim.

== Personal life and death ==
Mason's first marriage to Virginia Lee was dissolved in the 1970s, and he remarried to Ginny Mason in 1980. Mason died in 2006 and is survived by his wife and his children, Paul, Carla and Nik.

== Legacy ==
Mason's impact was to heighten the public's awareness to the injustice of the drug laws and to present alternatives for a better and more humane future. An inveterate campaigner for the human right to cognitive liberty, he will be remembered for the fight for civil rights denied to citizens in the 20th and 21st centuries. That Mason's impact came at a time when moderate drug policy reform was achieved was encouraging for him, but he continued to lobby and protest for full cognitive liberty as a basic human right in any civil society.
