= List of one-hit wonders on the UK singles chart =

This is a list of artists who have achieved one number-one hit on the UK singles chart and no other top 40 on the chart. The list uses the strict The Guinness Book of British Hit Singles definition of "one-hit wonder", a term also commonly used more loosely to refer to any act known primarily for one major hit.

== Methodology ==
A hit is attributed to the main artist given credit. If a single is released by two artists with the conjunction 'and' or 'versus' then both artists have equal billing (e.g. Yolanda Be Cool & DCUP, who have also been credited as Yolanda Be Cool vs. DCUP) and are both counted as having a number one (in this case "We No Speak Americano") whereas if the conjunction between two artists is 'featuring' or 'with' (or similar) then the first artist is considered the main artist for that hit, with the other artist listed being given a lesser billing (traditionally in these cases they would be additional vocalists or contributing instrumentalists, although in the 21st century it became common for the lead vocalist to be a 'featured' artist, with the main credit only affecting the chart in relation to the three-track rule). (Note: The Official Chart Rules are, in relation to the three-track rule: "A maximum of three singles within the Top 100 by the same artist will be chart eligible. These will be the three most popular singles in a week based on combined sales and streams. In the case of singles featuring a secondary artist(s), they will only count towards the primary named artist's maximum of three chart eligible singles. In the case of singles that are equal collaborations between two or more artists, a single will count towards the maximum of three chart eligible singles of the artist on the releasing label. Where all collaborating artists appear on the same label releasing a single, the releasing label must nominate the primary artist".)

Artists who are classed as one-hit wonders within the past twelve months are not yet added to the list, as they may still follow-up their number one with another hit. A one-hit wonder from earlier who now goes on to score another hit will be removed from this list.

== One-hit wonders ==
Artist	Peak date	Song	Notes
Kitty Kallen	11 September 1954	"Little Things Mean a Lot"	Despite scoring other hits in her native United States, Kallen never achieved another hit on the UK Chart, which at this point was a mere Top 12.
The Dream Weavers	17 March 1956	"It's Almost Tomorrow"	In the US, they scored a minor hit some months later, but then faded into obscurity there also.
The Kalin Twins	23 August 1958	"When"	It was heavily suggested that their song "Forget Me Not" be issued as a follow-up, but this was not pursued. The Kalin Twins remain the only one-hit wonder male siblings (composed of twin brothers).
Jerry Keller	10 October 1959	"Here Comes Summer"	Despite writing many hits, Keller only ever had one hit in his own right.
Ricky Valance	1 October 1960	"Tell Laura I Love Her"	Ricky Valance was the first British one-hit wonder (hailing from Wales). He scored further hits in mainland Europe, but none in the UK.
B. Bumble and the Stingers	19 May 1962	"Nut Rocker"	The song reappeared on the UK Chart ten years later, reaching number 19. An instrumental group, B. Bumble and the Stingers had already scored their biggest hit in the US with "Bumble Boogie" in 1961.
The Overlanders	29 January 1966	"Michelle"	A Beatles cover, which reached number 1 in January 1966 for three weeks. The Overlanders are the earliest British group to be classed as a one-hit wonder.
The Crazy World of Arthur Brown	17 August 1968	"Fire"	The group's debut self-titled album reached number two on the album chart, but neither the band nor Arthur Brown in his own right managed to secure another placing on either the singles or album chart.
Zager and Evans	30 August 1969	"In the Year 2525"	The song was written five years earlier, but did not become a success in the UK until it made number 1 in the US. It remains either member's only hit.
Jane Birkin and Serge Gainsbourg	11 October 1969	"Je t'aime... moi non plus"	The song was banned by the BBC, which has always been believed to be a major factor in the song's success. Serge Gainsbourg, a critically acclaimed but controversial French singer and director, scored his only UK chart success with this song and was the first non-UK/US one-hit wonder. However, according to the OCC, this duo have managed to have three hits all with the same record. This was because in the UK, it was first released by major label Fontana, who deleted the record by the time it had got to number two, due to its controversial nature. Gainsbourg then arranged a deal with independent label Major Minor Records who re-released the song, with the indie release being listed as a new hit (tagged as the Official Release) when it charted on the Official Singles Chart Top 50 on the week of 4 October 1969 at number 3. It climbed to number one the week after and was the first single in a foreign language to top the chart. In late 1974 it was re-released in the UK on Antic Records (a subsidiary of major label Atlantic Records) and charted again as a 'new' hit peaking at No. 31.
The Archies	25 October 1969	"Sugar, Sugar"	The Archies were ostensibly cartoon characters from the TV series, The Archie Show which was based on the popular Archie Comics published since the 1940s. In reality, the song was performed by a group of session singers. Other singles were released under their name that were successful in the United States, but none found success in the UK. Ron Dante, the session vocalist who sings lead on "Sugar Sugar", had two UK Top 10 hits in 1969/70 as the vocalist for The Cuff Links.
Lee Marvin	7 March 1970	"Wand'rin' Star"	Marvin, an Oscar and BAFTA-winning American actor, recorded the song for his then-current film, Paint Your Wagon. He did not release any further musical recordings. Initially the disc was listed as a double-A side record with the flip side being "I Talk To The Trees" by the American actor-director Clint Eastwood (rather than the reggae deejay). "I Talk To The Trees" charted for two weeks with a peak position of number 18, before the record's sole credit reverted to Marvin and "Wand'rin' Star".
Norman Greenbaum	2 May 1970	"Spirit in the Sky"	The song reached number one for three artists, with Greenbaum's hit being followed by versions by Doctor and the Medics in 1986 and Gareth Gates featuring The Kumars in 2003. Like a couple of other records on this list (for example, Hale & Pace and the Stonkers), the 2003 version is another Comic Relief charity single with the record being the only song recorded by The Kumars, while Doctor and the Medics are generally seen as one-hit wonders outside the Guinness list (they have had three Top 75 hits) on programmes such as the Channel 4 show Bring Back... One Hit Wonders and in newspapers such as The Guardian.
Matthews' Southern Comfort	31 October 1970	"Woodstock"	"Woodstock" was written by Joni Mitchell and a version by Crosby, Stills, Nash and Young had been an American top 20 hit earlier in 1970. Matthews' Southern Comfort was led by Iain Matthews, who despite his membership in other noted folk rock groups such as Fairport Convention and Plainsong, never had another hit as a performer. Matthews later had a solo hit in the United States and New Zealand with "Shake It" in 1978, but the song did not chart in the United Kingdom.
Clive Dunn	9 January 1971	"Grandad"	Clive Dunn was starring in the TV sitcom Dad's Army when he released this novelty single. Dunn released several follow-ups but never hit the chart again.
The Simon Park Orchestra	29 September 1973	"Eye Level"	Theme tune to the TV series Van der Valk. It eventually sold more than a million copies in the UK.
Typically Tropical	9 August 1975	"Barbados"	Regarded as a pastime by the two members, follow-up singles failed to chart and the duo split not long after. The song was later covered and reworded as We're Going To Ibiza! by The Vengaboys in 1999, which also reached number 1.
The Floaters	27 August 1977	"Float On"	The Detroit group followed their only hit with a cover of Dusty Springfield's "You Don't Have To Say You Love Me"
Althea & Donna	4 February 1978	"Uptown Top Ranking"	The song became a hit following airplay on John Peel's late night freeform programme on BBC Radio 1. Their follow-up "Puppy Dog Song" failed to chart.
Brian and Michael (Burke & Jerk)	8 April 1978	"Matchstalk Men and Matchstalk Cats and Dogs"	The only Burke & Jerk record to reach the Top 75 was recorded by Michael Coleman and Brian Burke under the name Brian and Michael, but promoted by Coleman with new band member Kevin Parrott. after Burke left the act while the record was climbing the chart. The record also featured the uncredited St Winifred's School Choir, who promoted the record on Top of the Pops with the new duo of Coleman and Parrott (who continued to be billed as Brian after their number one success). In 1983, Coleman and Parrott teamed up again with the St Winifred's School Choir (this time credited on the record as Bryan and Michael with St Winifred's School Choir) and charted at number 93 in the UK charts with the song "Mama".
Anita Ward	16 June 1979	"Ring My Bell"	Originally written for Stacy Lattisaw by Frederick Knight, it instead became Memphis-born Anita Ward's only hit. Her follow-up, "Don't Drop My Love", found few buyers.
Lena Martell	27 October 1979	"One Day at a Time"	Martell charted four UK top 20 albums, but her recording of this Kris Kristofferson song was her only hit single.
Fern Kinney	15 March 1980	"Together We Are Beautiful"	Originally a B-side, the song became her only UK success.
The MASH	31 May 1980	"Theme from M*A*S*H (Suicide Is Painless)"	Theme song to the film MASH, which reached number one 10 years after the film's 1970 release. The song was written by Johnny Mandel and Mike Altman, the 14-year-old son of the film's director Robert Altman. The song was recorded by a one-off configuration of session singers and musicians and released under the name The MASH.
St Winifred's School Choir	27 December 1980	"There's No-one Quite Like Grandma"	This school choir are sometimes credited as a 'double one-hit wonder' as they were the group backing Brian and Michael on their 1978 number 1 "Matchstalk Men and Matchstalk Cats and Dogs", and were shown promoting the record on Top of the Pops with singers Micheal Coleman and Kevin Parrott. In 1983, Coleman and Parrott teamed up again with the St Winifred's School Choir (this time credited on the record as Bryan and Michael with St Winifred's School Choir) and charted at number 93 in the UK charts with the song "Mama", though on the Official Charts website this has been incorrectly billed to Brian and Michael. The 1980 version of the choir featured lead vocalist Dawn Ralph and future Coronation Street actor Sally Lindsay (even though Lindsay was not a part of the Coronation Street cast when they recorded "Always Look On The Bright Side Of Life" for EMI Premier in 1995, the record did feature Bill Tarmey who had a Top 20 hit backed by the uncredited St Winifred's choir in 1993)
Joe Dolce Music Theatre	21 February 1981	"Shaddap You Face"	Novelty song, which kept Ultravox's hit "Vienna" from reaching the number 1 spot.
Charlene	26 June 1982	"I've Never Been to Me"	Recorded several years earlier, the song's belated success took Charlene by surprise and no new material was available for release afterwards until it was too late.
Partners in Kryme	28 July 1990	"Turtle Power"	The theme song from the film Teenage Mutant Ninja Turtles. Partners in Kryme only released one more single before disbanding.
Doop	19 March 1994	"Doop"	Two Dutch producers followed up their techno version of the 1920s dance The Charleston with the unsuccessful "Huckleberry Jam".
Teletubbies	13 December 1997	"Teletubbies say "Eh-oh!""	The theme song to the popular BBC children's television series sold more than one million copies. The Teletubbies also appear, along with a number of other fictional children's television characters, on the 2009 charity song "The Official BBC Children in Need Medley", credited to Peter Kay's Animated All Star Band.
Mr. Oizo	3 April 1999	"Flat Beat"	Used as the jingle for Levi Jeans and fronted by glove puppet, Flat Eric. This was the only UK hit for Quentin Dupieux, who continues a successful career as a musician in France on the underground dance scene. Dupieux, like Baz Luhrmann, is best known as a director of a number of feature films, such as 2010's Rubber and 2019's Le Daim (released in the United Kingdom as Deerskin in 2021).
Baz Luhrmann	12 June 1999	"Everybody's Free (To Wear Sunscreen)"	Luhrmann, better known as a film director, is credited as the producer on the song but does not perform on it. The song features Australian voice actor Lee Perry reading an essay written by American newspaper columnist Mary Schmich over a gentle backbeat. The song is a remix of Quindon Tarver's rendition of "Everybody's Free (To Feel Good)", which had previously appeared in Luhrmann's film Romeo + Juliet.
Rui Da Silva	13 January 2001	"Touch Me"	The single was Da Silva's only UK chart hit, although featured vocalist Cass Fox released her own version, which became a minor hit five years later.
DJ Pied Piper and the Masters of Ceremonies	2 June 2001	"Do You Really Like It?"	A follow-up was recorded but never released.
Las Ketchup	19 October 2002	"The Ketchup Song"	A group consisting of three Spanish sisters, Las Ketchup had a number one hit in more than 20 countries with "The Ketchup Song". Their follow-up singles were not as successful, and none of them managed to reach the UK chart.
Michael Andrews and Gary Jules	27 December 2003	"Mad World"	A Tears for Fears cover, this collaboration between American film composer Andrews and American singer-songwriter Jules was from the soundtrack of the 2001 film Donnie Darko, its success was spurred by the film's cult following. Neither musician's follow-up releases charted.
Frankee	22 May 2004	"F.U.R.B. (Fuck You Right Back)"	A response to the previous number 1 "Fuck It (I Don't Want You Back)" by Eamon.
3 of a Kind	21 August 2004	"Baby Cakes"	Despite the song's success, a follow-up single was never released.
Steve Brookstein	1 January 2005	"Against All Odds (Take a Look at Me Now)"	The first winner of The X Factor with a cover of the Phil Collins hit. Brookstein is also an album chart one-hit wonder as his album Heart and Soul reached the top on 21 May 2005 and spent five weeks within the Top 75.
Nizlopi	24 December 2005	"JCB"	The British folk duo were in contention for 2005's Christmas number one single but were replaced at number one on Christmas Day by The X Factor winner Shayne Ward. Their follow-up single "Girls" failed to reach the top 75. The duo later split in 2020.
Kleerup	18 August 2007	"With Every Heartbeat"	The Swedish producer collaborated with fellow Swedish artist Robyn on this number one single. None of his other singles have charted
Yolanda Be Cool & DCUP	25 July 2010	"We No Speak Americano"	This collaboration released two singles in 2014 and 2015 respectively; both of them failed to chart.
Sak Noel	8 October 2011	"Loca People"	Spanish DJ whose follow up single, "Paso (The Nini Anthem)", peaked well outside of the chart.
Gotye	18 February 2012	"Somebody That I Used to Know"	Neither Gotye nor featured artist Kimbra have charted since, despite the track becoming the best selling single of 2012. Gotye has yet to release a follow-up album to 2011's Making Mirrors, which housed this number 1. Kimbra released three critically acclaimed albums following the success of the song, but none of her singles charted.
Sam and the Womp	1 September 2012	"Bom Bom"	Electronic band which included Aaron Audio, the son of noted producer Trevor Horn. Subsequent singles failed to chart and the band have yet to release a full-length album.
Storm Queen	16 November 2013	"Look Right Through"	Storm Queen, the performing alias of American DJ Morgan Geist, who would next issue a track in 2021 under the Storm Queen name, called "For A Fool", without success Geist scored his number 1 hit after this song from 2010 was remixed by Marc Kinchen, a remixer who has also a number of Top 75 hits between 1995 and 2025 under the name MK. As Kinchen was not listed as part of the main artist credit, for his work on "Look Right Through", the OCC have stated that he has taken 30 years and 6 months to get a number 1 hit with his song "Dior", even though MK's name was on the front cover of the 2013 release of "Look Right Through".
Sam Bailey	28 December 2013	"Skyscraper"	Bailey was the winner of tenth season of the singing competition The X Factor, and her cover of the Demi Lovato hit was the Christmas number one for 2013. Her two follow-up singles failed to reach the Top 100.
Route 94	15 March 2014	"My Love"	A collaboration with Jess Glynne. Route 94 has not released another single that has reached the UK chart since, but did remix MK featuring Alana's "Always", which charted at number 12 in August the same year.
Borgeous	22 March 2014	"Tsunami (Jump)"	A collaboration with DVBBS and featuring rapper Tinie Tempah. American DJ Borgeous released a follow-up single called "Invincible", but it did not chart in the UK.
Secondcity	7 June 2014	"I Wanna Feel"	The British-American DJ's number one single featured uncredited vocals from previous chart-topper Daniel Bedingfield and heavily samples "You're Makin' Me High" by Toni Braxton. His follow-up single "What Can I Do" failed to reach the top 75.
Magic!	9 August 2014	"Rude"	A Canadian reggae fusion quartet led by veteran pop songwriter Nasri Atweh. "Rude" peaked at number one in seven countries, including the United States and United Kingdom, but subsequent singles failed to become hits in any market aside from their native Canada.
Nico & Vinz	16 August 2014	"Am I Wrong"	Duo who became the first Norwegian act to top the UK Singles Chart since a-ha's "The Sun Always Shines on T.V." in 1986.
Lilly Wood and the Prick	6 September 2014	"Prayer in C"	French duo whose single became popular when it was remixed by Robin Schulz. Although the original charted at number 90 on the Official Sales Chart upon the release of the remixed version, it failed to make it onto the singles chart. None of the duo's other songs have ever charted outside of Francophone countries.
David Zowie	16 July 2015	"House Every Weekend"	Zowie did not release a follow-up single for two years, which then failed to chart.
Rachel Platten	3 September 2015	"Fight Song"	The singer-songwriter's follow-up "Stand by You" was a platinum-selling Top 40 hit in her native United States, but it and other singles did not chart in the United Kingdom after the success of "Fight Song".
KDA	29 October 2015	"Turn the Music Louder (Rumble)"	The British DJ's single "Rumble" was given a vocal reworking featuring British rapper Tinie Tempah and British singer Katy B. His follow-up single "Just Say" featuring American singer Tinashe failed to reach the top 75.
Jawsh 685	9 July 2020	"Savage Love (Laxed – Siren Beat)"	Jawsh 685's instrumental song "Laxed (Siren Beat)" was used by singer Jason Derulo for his song "Savage Love", which resulted in both artists getting a credit for the latter's single, which was re-titled "Savage Love (Laxed – Siren Beat)" by the time it was a hit. Another version of the song featuring K-Pop boyband BTS was issued during the record's chart success, but unlike the Billboard chart, the OCC did not give the Korean act any additional credit.
Billen Ted	19 March 2021	"Wellerman"	Billen Ted was one of the remixers of Nathan Evans' "Wellerman", listed with a main artist credit by the OCC alongside 220 Kid, another of the record's remixers. On 22 January 2021, Scottish musician Nathan Evans released his version of the sea shanty "Soon May the Wellerman Come" with his version being similar to that of British folk group The Longest Johns. At the same time a remix was commissioned by Evans' record company Polydor, with the remixers being 220 Kid and Billen Ted. The Official Charts Company (OCC) decided that the remix would be the main version with the record credited to each of the three artists (billed as Nathan Evans x 220 Kid x Billen Ted when the single reached number one on the UK Singles Chart (Note: Previously, any additional remixes or versions would be merged and catalogued under the first solo edition, though the OCC have changed their regulations to allow artists (such as Ed Sheeran) a credit on the chart when they are added to a solo hit (in Sheeran's case, the remix of Fireboy DML's Top 10 hit "Peru" in January 2022).)). On 12 January 2024, Evans charted outside the Top 75 with "Heather on the Hill" and climbed to number 42 the week after, taking him off the list. In 2024, Billen Ted charted outside the Top 75 with a version of "Man In Finance (G6 Trust Fund)" by Girl On Couch. This release saw their version of Megan Boni's song "Man In Finance" being further remixed by David Guetta, with all three acts sharing a chart credit. As William '220 Kid' Graydon's collaboration with Gracey ("Don't Need Love") peaked at number 9 in 2020, he did not make the list of one-hit wonders when the record reached number one.
Gayle	14 January 2022	"ABCDEFU"	Released in August 2021, Gayle's break-out single did not chart until December, where it originally reached number 2. The song eventually peaked at number 1 for one week in January 2022, before being knocked off the top of the UK Singles Chart by "We Don't Talk About Bruno", by the cast of the 2021 Disney movie Encanto. None of Gayle's other songs charted in the UK or any other country, including her native U.S.
Carolina Gaitán	21 January 2022	"We Don't Talk About Bruno"	Members of the cast of the Walt Disney Animation Studios movie Encanto, who were all credited on the first original song from a Disney animated film to top the UK Singles Chart. Also credited on the song were Diane Guerrero, who charted with the song "What Else Can I Do?" from the same film, and Stephanie Beatriz who charted with both "What Else Can I Do?" and "The Family Madrigal", also from Encanto.
Mauro Castillo	21 January 2022	"We Don't Talk About Bruno"	Members of the cast of the Walt Disney Animation Studios movie Encanto, who were all credited on the first original song from a Disney animated film to top the UK Singles Chart. Also credited on the song were Diane Guerrero, who charted with the song "What Else Can I Do?" from the same film, and Stephanie Beatriz who charted with both "What Else Can I Do?" and "The Family Madrigal", also from Encanto.
Adassa	21 January 2022	"We Don't Talk About Bruno"	Members of the cast of the Walt Disney Animation Studios movie Encanto, who were all credited on the first original song from a Disney animated film to top the UK Singles Chart. Also credited on the song were Diane Guerrero, who charted with the song "What Else Can I Do?" from the same film, and Stephanie Beatriz who charted with both "What Else Can I Do?" and "The Family Madrigal", also from Encanto.
Rhenzy Feliz	21 January 2022	"We Don't Talk About Bruno"	Members of the cast of the Walt Disney Animation Studios movie Encanto, who were all credited on the first original song from a Disney animated film to top the UK Singles Chart. Also credited on the song were Diane Guerrero, who charted with the song "What Else Can I Do?" from the same film, and Stephanie Beatriz who charted with both "What Else Can I Do?" and "The Family Madrigal", also from Encanto.
LF System	14 July 2022	"Afraid to Feel"	The Scottish production duo from West Lothian followed up their number one record with singles like "Hungry (For Love)" and "Dancing Shoes (Take Me Higher)" without success, whilst uncredited vocalist Louise Clare Marshall is part of Jools Holland's Rhythm and Blues Orchestra and has featured as a lead vocalist on a number of their albums, including the Top 40 charting release Sirens of Song. After 8 weeks at number one, "Afraid to Feel" was replaced at the top by "B.O.T.A. (Baddest of Them All)", a dance track by Eliza Rose and Interplanetary Criminal, which includes another act who has yet to make the Top 75 with another song, with their chart topper making them one-hit wonders.
Interplanetary Criminal	2 September 2022	"B.O.T.A. (Baddest of Them All)"	The second dance music record in a row to have been picked up by Warner Music without any follow-up success for the label and the Official Singles Chart's 1,400th number-one single was a collaboration by Eliza Rose and Interplanetary Criminal. Eliza Rose's follow-up single "Better Love" was also released via a singles deal with Warner, but after the single failed to reach the heights "B.O.T.A." did, the deal was not extended, with her next release "Pleasure Peak" (with The Martinez Brothers) being released by her Rosebud Recordings label in association with the One House label. In 2023, Eliza Rose charted with a single with Calvin Harris, on the Ministry of Sound label which reached the Top 40 in January 2024. However, while Rose is no longer a one-hit wonder, the DJ Zach Bruce has not had any other records under the Interplanetary Criminal name chart in the UK singles chart.
Kenya Grace	19 October 2023	"Strangers"	Another dance music record picked up by Warner Music without any follow-up success, this time via their specialist dance label FFRR Records. "Strangers" was number one for three weeks, the last week on sales of 37,139 units, a total exceeded by every number one record in the following 12 months. The South African-born artist followed up her number one with a single called "Paris" and an EP called The After Taste, which featured "Strangers" and another follow-up single called "It's Not Fair", which also failed to chart.

== Under an alternative name ==
- The KLF scored a single hit as The Timelords (the number 1 "Doctorin' the Tardis" in 1988), but scored individual hits as The Justified Ancients of Mu Mu (aka The JAMs) and 2K, and several hits, including another number 1, as The KLF.
- Isaac Hayes reached number 1 as Chef with "Chocolate Salty Balls (P.S. I Love You)" in 1998. Hayes had hits under his own name during the 1970s, with "Chocolate Salty Balls" listed under his discography in the hit singles books and online, as part of the Official Charts Company database. Comedy Central's South Park team followed up "Chocolate Salty Balls" with another British Top 10 hit, this time for character Mr. Hankey, in the Christmas chart of 1999.

== Band members charting as a one-hit solo act ==
- Steve 'Silk' Hurley on 24 January 1987 had his only UK solo chart entry "Jack Your Body" which went to number 1. The well-known producer had scored many hits on the UK Dance Chart and was a member of JM Silk (who have had other chart entries). Hurley refused to promote himself as a solo artist and went on to remix many more chart hits.
- Yanou has been responsible for two number one hits in the UK singles chart, "Heaven" and "Evacuate the Dancefloor". Whereas the latter song was one of his numerous hits with his Eurodance group Cascada, the former track (a dance cover of a 1980s Bryan Adams song) was the only time Yanou's name appeared in the UK Top 75 under the guise of a solo act. "Heaven" was actually a collaboration with DJ Sammy and singer Dominique Van Hulst (Do), with the record credited to DJ Sammy & Yanou featuring Do. Even though DJ Sammy charted again in the UK Top 10 with a few more dance music covers, "Heaven" was the only time Van Hulst reached the UK Singles chart.

=== See also ===
- M|A|R|R|S was a collaboration between a number of acts on the independent label 4AD, which spawned a chart topping double A-sided single on 3 October 1987. Involved in the one-off release were the dream pop/shoegaze band A.R. Kane and electronic group Colourbox, with This Mortal Coil's John Fryer and DJs/former Nasty Rox Inc. members C.J. Mackintosh and Dave Dorrell, also being involved in the creation of M|A|R|R|S's number one(s). On one side was the Colourbox track "Pump Up the Volume", written by the band's Martyn and Steve Young, and on the other side was the A.R. Kane track "Anitiиa (The First Time I See She Dance)", with both tracks getting input from the other band, Fryer and the DJs. As it was a one-off project, no follow-up was ever released, with M|A|R|R|S joining charity group Dunblane as a one-hit wonder with two songs at number one. Separately, both the main acts charted on the UK Indie Chart, with Colourbox having a self-titled Top 75 album hit, but neither charted on the main UK Singles Chart. This Mortal Coil, featuring Fryer and 4AD label founder Ivo Watts-Russell, the person who suggested the collaboration in the first place, had two Top 40 album hits and reached number 66 with a version of Tim Buckley's "Song to the Siren" featuring vocals from Cocteau Twins' Elizabeth Fraser. ZTT band Nasty Rox Inc. did not have any Top 75 hits, but reached number 93 with "Escape From New York". Allmusic describes "Pump Up the Volume" as "a one-hit wonder of rare influence", owing to its importance in the history of sampling and electronic dance music.

== One hit wonders excluding collaboration work ==
This features artists who went to number one on their own with their only solo hit, however their only additional chart entries were with other artists.

- John Denver on his own had only a single UK chart entry, with "Annie's Song" which reached number one in 1974. He also collaborated with Plácido Domingo on another single, 1981's "Perhaps Love" which reached number 46 and was his only other chart entry. Denver also had five Top 20 albums on the UK Albums Chart during the 1970s. His lack of singles chart success in the United Kingdom stands in contrast to his popularity in his native United States, where he charted 15 Top 40 entries, including four number one singles.
- Robin Beck reached number one on 19 November 1988 with her song "First Time". The song became a success after its use as a jingle by Coca-Cola. and was followed by Beck's cover of Bonnie Tyler's "Save Up All Your Tears", which narrowly missed out on chart inclusion by peaking at number 84. In 2006, Swedish dance outfit Sunblock, along with Robin Beck, recorded a cover, which peaked at number 9 in the UK. According to the OCC, records, in the pre-digital age, re-recorded vocals (for example, live versions) or remixes released with substantially different catalogue numbers were considered new hits (see "Blue Monday" as an example). Thanks to the Sunblock record, Robin Beck now has two Top 40 hits, moving her beyond one-hit wonder status.

=== See also ===
- Coco Star, who has seen her one hit song "I Need a Miracle" reach the chart three times in a number of different guises, most notably in a mash-up with her vocals attached to the instrumental dance track "Toca Me" by German trance group Fragma. This version, called "Toca's Miracle", was a number one hit in 2000 and has gone into the Official Charts database listed under the band name Coco Vs Fragma alongside a remixed version from 2008, classed as another hit. Meanwhile, the original "I Need a Miracle" was a top 40 hit in 1997.
- Saint Jhn; this Guyanese-American rapper and singer had a UK number one after his 2016 song "Roses" was remixed by the Kazakh producer Imanbek Zeykenov in 2019. Even though other remixes, such as Nathan Evans' version of "Wellerman", have been listed as collaborations by the OCC, Imanbek was given no additional credit for the song, which became popular due to the remix. Prior to "Roses" reaching the top, Saint Jhn's only other chart entry was as part of the Beyoncé song "Brown Skin Girl". This song charted after featuring on the film soundtrack to the Disney film The Lion King (The Gift), with the song also featuring Blue Ivy Carter and Wizkid. Nevertheless, "Brown Skin Girl" failed to reach the Top 40, with "Roses" his only song to reach the upper reaches of the chart. As for Imanbek, he would not be a one-hit wonder if he had been given a credit for his role in this number one hit, as he was credited on two other dance music collaborations in 2021 with Goodboys and Rita Ora.

== Comic Relief singles ==
for more information on Red Nose Day, see the main Comic Relief page.

Comic Relief presents Cliff Richard and The Young Ones featuring Hank Marvin

The first Comic Relief record to reach number one in the UK singles chart was "Living Doll" in 1986. The song was a version of Cliff Richard and The Shadows' 1959 number one hit "Living Doll", recorded when the band were called The Drifters. Cliff Richard, The Shadows and band member Hank B. Marvin have had many hits in their own rights, including numerous number ones, while The Young Ones cast members Rik Mayall, Adrian Edmondson and Nigel Planer have made other chart appearances as part of their spoof band Bad News (with Peter Richardson). In addition to these hits, Planer also had a number two hit as his Young Ones character 'Neil' in 1984, whilst Mayall's football song "Noble England" charted in the UK Top 10 as a tribute by fans after his death. Actor Christopher Ryan was the only member of The Young Ones (featured on the record) who did not feature on any other chart entries, whilst missing cast member Alexei Sayle had a hit two years earlier with "'Ullo John! Gotta New Motor?". Even though Gallup did not credit Comic Relief's involvement on this record, the follow-up ("Rockin' Around the Christmas Tree") has gone into the Official Chart Company's database as being by Comic Relief Presents Mel & Kim Performed By Kim Wilde & Mel Smith.

Comic Relief - Hale & Pace and the Stonkers/Victoria Wood

In 1991, Gareth Hale and Norman Pace were a comedy double-act known at the time for starring in their own sketch comedy series on ITV. "The Stonk", a charity single for Comic Relief, was produced by Queen guitarist Brian May, who also performed on the song, had his name printed on the front cover and was part of the charity supergroup on the record called the Stonkers. "The Stonk", was based on a fictitious dance craze and was co-written by the two comedians along with Joe Griffiths. Other musicians performing on the single, besides Brian May playing keyboards and guitar, were David Gilmour and Tony Iommi on guitar, with Neil Murray on bass guitar. Cozy Powell, Roger Taylor and Rowan Atkinson – appearing as his character Mr. Bean – performed on drums. Joe Griffiths and Mike Moran contributed on keyboard. Hale & Pace never released another single, while Rowan Atkinson was featured on the follow-up single "(I Wanna Be) Elected", credited to Mr Bean and Smear Campaign ft Bruce Dickinson, another top ten hit for Comic Relief.

A UK number-one single for one week on 23 March 1991, "The Stonk" was the UK's 22nd-best-selling single of the year. "The Stonk" was released as a joint-single with a track written and performed by the comedian Victoria Wood. Entitled "The Smile Song", the song was credited on the front of the single cover and listed as track 2 on the seven-inch and CD single (rather than B-side). However, the UK singles chart compilers (now the Official Charts Company) did not credit her with having number one hit, in a situation similar to the fate of BAD II's "Rush", the AA-side of preceding number one, "Should I Stay or Should I Go" by The Clash. Rival chart compilers MRIB did, however, credit "The Smile Song" as a double A-sided number one on the Network Chart.

Gareth Gates with special guests The Kumars

"Spirit in the Sky" is a song sometimes credited as a 'three-time one-hit wonder' as it was also a number one hit for Norman Greenbaum as well as Doctor and the Medics, a band who are not actually a one-hit wonder as they also had a hit with "Burn" in 1986 and charted with a cover of ABBA's "Waterloo" with Roy Wood. Even though Gareth Gates is an artist with four number ones, including his first three releases, The Kumars (comedians Sanjeev Bhaskar, Meera Syal, Indira Joshi and Vincent Ebrahim from the chat show of the same name) have never charted again.

Vanessa Jenkins and Bryn West featuring Sir Tom Jones and Robin Gibb

"(Barry) Islands in the Stream" was a version of a Bee Gees song originally recorded by Kenny Rogers and Dolly Parton, and a single which topped the UK chart on 15 March 2009. It was recorded by Welsh actor-comedians Ruth Jones and Rob Brydon as characters from the hit BBC sitcom Gavin & Stacey, a show where they were originally seen singing the song. The single was recorded for Red Nose Day 2009 with the duo being joined by Welsh singer Sir Tom Jones and Bee Gee Robin Gibb.

== Aggregate ensemble groups ==
The following is a list of aggregate ensemble groups. These are usually put together for charity purposes. The ones listed below are one-hit wonders in their respective line-ups, but most are primarily made up of several chart artists. The following line-ups have all reached number one in their only hit under these umbrella group names:

- The Crowd ("You'll Never Walk Alone", 1985)
- Ferry Aid ("Let It Be", 1987)
- Dunblane ("Knocking on Heaven's Door"/"Throw These Guns Away", 1996) (this was a double-A side with a cover version of Bob Dylan on one side (with additional lyrics), and an original co-written by Bannockburn member Ted Christopher on the other)
- Various Artists ("Perfect Day", 1997)
- Helping Haiti ("Everybody Hurts", 2010)
- Shout for England featuring Dizzee Rascal and James Corden ("Shout", 2010) (currently listed in the Official Chart Company's archive as "Shout" by Shout featuring Dizzee and James Corden)
- Artists for Grenfell ("Bridge over Troubled Water", 2017)
- Live Lounge Allstars ("Times Like These (BBC Radio 1 Stay Home)", 2020)

Note: there have been a few collaborations and multi-artist EPs which have charted under the name 'Various Artists', none of which match the one singing "Perfect Day" as listed above, which is why this record is eligible for inclusion on this list. (Note: In 2000, there was another version of "Perfect Day" released for BBC Music Live which charted at number 69 in the chart, while records like "Thank ABBA for the Music" are currently listed under the 'Various Artists' tab at officialcharts.com and not under each artist's discography as in the case of the later chart books by HiT Entertainment/Virgin Books.)

== Aggregate ensemble groups: charity records - special cases ==
Band Aid

Currently the Official Charts Company (OCC) lists the four versions of "Do They Know it's Christmas?" separately on their website under entries for Band Aid (1984), Band Aid 20 (2004), Band Aid 30 (2014) and Band Aid II (1989). However they were combined under the main Band Aid entry in various British Hit Singles books, giving the act an achievement of its first four records at number one.

"We Are the World"

"We Are the World", was a separate hit twice for two interlinked charity ensembles. Originally a UK number one in 1985 for USA for Africa, it was re-recorded for the We Are the World Foundation under the name "We Are the World 25 for Haiti" by Artists for Haiti, with Quincy Jones and Lionel Richie being the main people involved in the production of both records. The Artists for Haiti version reached number 50 in the UK charts, whilst the USA for Africa album (actually a compilation which also featured the Canadian charity record "Tears Are Not Enough") reached number 31 on the albums chart.

The X Factor finalists

Currently the Official Charts Company lists each year's charity record by The X Factor finalists under a separate recording act entry as the contestants in the ITV show The X Factor were different every year, meaning that the group of finalists were different each year as well. However, various British Hit Singles books combined the four number ones (for "Hero", 2008; "You Are Not Alone", 2009; "Heroes", 2010 and "Wishing on a Star", 2011) under one X Factor Finalists entry, also giving the act an achievement of its first four records at number one.

The Justice Collective

In 2012, The Justice Collective reached number one with a cover of "He Ain't Heavy, He's My Brother". This single was one of a number of campaigning charity record projects put together by Peter Hooton of The Farm, with the others being a number 14 UK hit single called "The Fields of Anfield Road" credited to the Liverpool Collective featuring the Kop Choir (a record which also reached number one in Scotland on 26 April 2009, because the Scottish chart at that time only reflected sales in the declining physical formats and did not include the then-growing download market), and a version of the Farm's "All Together Now", credited to The Peace Collective, which peaked at number 70 in 2014.

Lewisham and Greenwich NHS Choir

In 2015, the Lewisham and Greenwich NHS Choir had the UK Singles Chart Christmas number one, beating Justin Bieber to the top of this chart with their charity release "A Bridge over You". Five years later they recorded a version of Bieber's song "Holy" with him. However, when the record was released in December 2020 it was credited as a remix with the Official Charts Company combining it with the original entry, with no additional Lewisham and Greenwich NHS Choir credit. In May 2021, the Lewisham and Greenwich NHS Choir were featured on a charity version of "Anywhere Away From Here" by Rag 'n' Bone Man and P!nk, which was performed by all three acts at the 2021 BRIT Awards, and helped the record reach the top ten. As in the case of "Holy", the new version of "Anywhere Away From Here" was combined with the already charting original by the Official Charts Company, with no additional credit for the choir. In addition to these records, a single was released by NHS Voices in 2018 with the record company credit going to the Lewisham and Greenwich NHS Choir. This single was a charity version of the Beatles' "With a Little Help from My Friends" reached only number 89 and stayed just 1 week in the UK Top 100.

Michael Ball, Captain Tom Moore and the Voices of Care Choir

Captain Sir Tom Moore was a 99-year-old war veteran who raised more than £32 million for NHS Charities Together during the COVID-19 pandemic by walking 100 laps of his garden before his 100th birthday. Singer and BBC Radio 2 presenter Michael Ball decided that he would try and make Moore the oldest artist to have a number one hit in the UK by recording a fundraising cover of the Rodgers and Hammerstein song "You'll Never Walk Alone" with the intention that the song would be at number one in the Official Singles Chart at the point Captain Moore turned 100. The duo teamed up with the NHS Voices of Care Choir with the song, credited to Michael Ball, Captain Tom Moore and the Voices of Care Choir, reaching the top spot on the chart dated 30 April 2020. Even though Ball has had hits in the singles and albums chart (including three number one albums with Alfie Boe), Moore died on 2 February 2021, with one hit single and the record for the oldest artist to have a chart topper, while the Voices of Care Choir were the second NHS associated choir to get a number one hit, after the Lewisham and Greenwich NHS Choir. In addition to these records, a charity version of the Beatles' "With a Little Help from My Friends" was released in 2018 credited to NHS Voices. Even though the record only reached number 89 in the UK charts and stayed just 1 week in the UK Top 100, it is likely that many of the choir members appeared on Captain Tom Moore's record and on "A Bridge over You".

== Special cases - Football records ==
Please note that some chart books will group records by one team under one entry even though the squad will have changed over the decades.

ENGLANDneworder

An ensemble group consisting of electropop group New Order and the England national football team and their 1990 FIFA World Cup campaign. The song, "World In Motion", spent two weeks at number one, with ENGLANDneworder being used by graphic designer Peter Saville on the single sleeve. The England national football team is listed under four different England World Cup Squad recording acts by the OCC with "Back Home" being a number one hit for the team in 1970. while members of New Order have charted as part of Electronic, Joy Division, Monaco and the Other Two. "World In Motion" was the only number one hit on the UK Singles Chart for New Order, with the Manchester band having the sole credit for the record since 2002. "World In Motion" was co-written by Fat Les' Keith Allen and features a rap from John Barnes, who was part of Liverpool FC when they had a Top 10 hit with the "Anfield Rap".

Manchester United Football Squad

In a way similar to England national team, Manchester United have charted before with different squads and with slight amendments to their football team brand, as listed on the Official Charts database. "Come on You Reds" was a Number One song recorded by the 1994 Manchester United football squad, featuring an uncredited Status Quo (who also wrote and produced the record) with the song spending 15 weeks on the UK charts.

Baddiel & Skinner & Lightning Seeds

Like Robin Beck, this act had a Number 1 song which has charted again as a new hit with re-recorded versions and like ELV1S vs JXL (Note: "A Little Less Conversation" was a number one in 2002 as RCA 74321943572 and then listed as a new number 3 hit in 2005 as RCA 82876666832 in The Virgin Book of British Hit Singles in a period of the charts that classed re-issues like this as a 'new' hits, giving Elvis Presley a record breaking 21 number ones) a song which has been classed as a hit more than once by The Virgin Book of British Hit Singles. Originally a number one under the title "Three Lions" (Epic 6632732) in 1996, it was re-recorded with updated lyrics in 1998 as "3 Lions '98" (Epic 6660982), when it reached number one again. The 1998 version was then re-issued as "3 Lions" in 2002 (Epic 6728152) with a DualDisc version coming out in 2006 (Sony BMG 82876856672) effectively making the record a double-A side (a fact reflected in Sony's 2021 re-issue under the title "3 Lions: Football's Coming Home - 25th Anniversary Edition"). Since the chart rules (Note: Current chart rules state: "In addition to 3 physical formats and 3 digital bundles, an unlimited number of digital variants of the featured song may be combined for a chart position. Note: The featured song across all formats of a single need not be identical for their transactions to be combined, but should be substantially the same - that is, an identical OR extended OR remixed OR live OR alternative version of the basic song".) were updated to reflect streaming, both versions have been combined under the title "3 Lions" regardless if people stream the original "Three Lions" or the 1998 version (with any additional chart weeks put under a listing for "3 Lions" on the Official Charts site even though the record was listed as "Three Lions" in 1996). In addition to these four "3 Lions" hits, David Baddiel, Frank Skinner and Ian Broudie (the Lightning Seeds) re-recorded the song again in 2010, this time with Robbie Williams, Trevor Horn and Russell Brand. Instead of listing all of their names on the front cover, this re-recording was credited to the Squad. and is known as "3 Lions 2010" or "Three L10ns". This song peaked at number 21 on the UK singles chart and gave Baddiel and Skinner five hits out of one song (compared to two Top 40 hits for Robin Beck's "First Time").

== Featured artists ==
Acts charting in the days of The Guinness Book of British Hit Singles with the conjunction 'and' or 'versus' were seen as a separate recording act when they had amassed a number of hits together, with acts seen as a footnote if they had been featured on a record. However, by the time of the Hit Entertainment and Virgin chart books (and also reflected in the information held by the Official Charts site) featured artists had been given equal status as the main recording act (so that Ed Sheeran has 10 number ones with "River" by Eminem being part of that total, and Sheeran's discography being responsible for number ones by Stormzy and Khalid where they feature as guest acts), with any hits added to the featured artists discography if they had already had been a lead artist or had amassed enough hits as a featured artist to be listed separately. Listed below is a table of acts whose only singles chart appearance has been as a featured artist on a number one hit.

Artist	Single	Main artist credit	Peak date (week ending date)	Weeks at number one
Sarah Jane Morris	"Don't Leave Me This Way"	The Communards	13 September 1986	4
Bebe Winans	"I Wanna Be the Only One"	Eternal	31 May 1997	4
The Kumars	"Spirit in the Sky"	Gareth Gates	22 March 2003	2
Avery Storm	"Nasty Girl"	The Notorious B.I.G.	4 February 2006	2
DJ Mental Theo's Bazzheadz	"Now You're Gone"	Basshunter	19 January 2008	5
Amelle (Note: Amelle Berrabah was a Sugababes member between 2005 and 2011)	"Never Leave You"	Tinchy Stryder	15 August 2009	1
Laza Morgan	"Start Without You"	Alexandra Burke	18 September 2010	2
Eric Turner (Note: Eric Turner also appears on the BRIT Awards mash-up "We Bring the Stars Out" which charted at number 40 in February 2011 and includes this song as part of a medley with Tinie's "Miami 2 Ibiza" and "Pass Out". Even though Labyrinth did not get a credit for "Pass Out" at the time that record was number one, the Official Charts Company have credited him as the featured artist on "We Bring the Stars Out", with Eric Turner and Swedish House Mafia being uncredited for their roles in the track.)	"Written in the Stars"	Tinie Tempah	3 October 2010	1
Lauren Bennett (Note: Lauren Bennett was a member of the American-British-Canadian pop group G.R.L. between 2012–2021, with the band charting two singles in the UK.)	"Party Rock Anthem"	LMFAO	23 April 2011	4
GoonRock	"Party Rock Anthem"	LMFAO	23 April 2011	4
Nayer	"Give Me Everything"	Pitbull	28 May 2011	3
Sian Evans (Note: Sian Evans was the lead singer with Kosheen, who had eight Top 75 hits on the Singles Chart and two Top 10 albums on the Albums chart between 2000 and 2003)	"Louder"	DJ Fresh	16 July 2011	1
Josh Kumra	"Don't Go"	Wretch 32	27 August 2011	1
Kimbra	"Somebody That I Used to Know"	Gotye	12 February 2012	5
Wanz	"Thrift Shop"	Macklemore & Ryan Lewis	16 February 2013	1
A*M*E	"Need U (100%)"	Duke Dumont	13 April 2013	2
Cody Wise	"It's My Birthday"	will.i.am	19 July 2014	1
Dan Caplen	"These Days"	Rudimental	5 April 2018	1
070 Shake	"Escapism"	Raye	12 January 2023	1

== See also ==
- One-hit wonder
- Lists of one-hit wonders
- List of one-hit wonders on the UK Albums Chart
- List of one-hit wonders on the UK Singles Downloads Chart
