= St Winifred's Roman Catholic Primary School =

Primary school in England

Coordinates: 53°24′46.8″N 2°11′42.3″W

Location
- Didsbury Road; Heaton Mersey; Stockport, Greater Manchester, SK4 3JH; England

Information
- Type: Voluntary aided school
- Motto: Caritas – God’s Love in Action
- Religious affiliation: Roman Catholic
- Established: 1936
- Local authority: Stockport
- Department for Education URN: 106129 Tables
- Ofsted: Reports
- Head teacher: Mrs Alicia Duffy
- Gender: Coeducational
- Age: 4 to 11

St Winifred's Roman Catholic Primary School is a Roman Catholic primary school. Opened in 1936, the British school is a part of the Parish of Saint Winifred with Saint Mary in Heaton Mersey, Stockport, England; part of the Diocese of Salford.

The school serves children aged 4 to 11 and operates as a voluntary academy under the Diocese of Salford. As of 2026, the school has transitioned into the Emmaus Catholic Academy Trust, a move finalized in late 2025. The school's official motto is "Caritas – God’s Love in Action," which it aims to demonstrate through a curriculum centered on Christian values and community partnerships.

Academically, the school follows the National Curriculum, organized into blocks of learning designed to provide a broad and balanced education. Recent data indicates that the school maintains high standards in Key Stage 2, with approximately 69% of pupils meeting the expected standard in reading, writing, and mathematics in 2024, exceeding local and national averages. The school also reports a consistently high attendance rate, recently recorded at approximately 96.6%.

In 1980 the school achieved national notability when its school choir released a song, "There's No One Quite Like Grandma", that became the Christmas number one single of that year and stayed at the top of the charts for two whole weeks. Over the decades, the ensemble released multiple albums and participated in various charitable recordings, including a 2009 reunion to support Age Concern.

== History ==
The school occupies a site that was once home to Poolstock, a Victorian house that stood in what are now the school grounds. After the previous owners, the Leigh family, moved away, the property was acquired by the Catholic Church and repurposed as a convent and school. This transformation eventually led to the establishment of St Winifred’s Primary School, which served the growing local parish population.

The school is perhaps most widely recognised for the historic success of the St Winifred's School Choir, which was formed in 1968. Under the direction of conductor Terri Foley, the choir achieved national fame, most notably reaching number one on the UK Singles Chart in December 1980 with the single "There's No One Quite Like Grandma". The record sold over one million copies and earned the school significant royalties, which were historically used to fund practical improvements such as new books and school carpets. Over the decades, the ensemble released multiple albums and participated in various charitable recordings, including a 2009 reunion to support Age Concern.

In more recent history, the school has undergone a major administrative transition. On April 30, 2025, the original voluntary-aided school officially closed to facilitate its conversion into a voluntary academy. It reopened the following day, May 1, 2025, as part of the Emmaus Catholic Academy Trust. This change ended its status as a direct local authority school and placed it under the management of the multi-academy trust, marking a new chapter in its governance while maintaining its Roman Catholic character and ties to the Diocese of Salford.

== Notable former pupils ==
One of the children who appeared on television in the 1980 recording of "There's No One Quite Like Grandma" was Sally Lindsay, who has gone on to become an actress, appearing in the ITV soap opera Coronation Street and the BBC sitcom The Royle Family. Another, Jennifer Hennessy, is also a television actress and has appeared in the BBC drama Doctor Who and the BBC comedy The Office.

- David Wightman – Artist / Painter
- Sally Lindsay – Actress on Coronation Street.
- Dominic Monaghan – Actor on Lost and The Lord of the Rings.
- Jennifer Hennessy – Actress on Doctor Who and The Cup.
