= Claire and Friends =

English music group (1986)

- Origin: Stockport, Greater Manchester, England
- Years active: 1986
- Label: BBC Records and Tapes
- Past members: Claire Usher

Claire and Friends were an English music group, consisting of schoolgirl Claire Usher and her friends, from St Winifred's Roman Catholic Primary School in Stockport.

Their one hit single was with the novelty record "It's 'Orrible Being in Love (When You're 8½)", which entered the UK Singles Chart on 7 June 1986, and reached number 13. The song is about a girl who has a crush on a boy in her class. The chorus consists of:

It's 'orrible being in love when you're eight 'n 'arf.
I got your picture on me wall
Got your name upon me scarf
Oh it's 'orrible being in love, 'orrible being in love when you're eight 'n 'arf.

The song was intended as a kind of follow-up to the number one hit "There's No One Quite Like Grandma", which the St Winifred's School Choir recorded at the start of the 1980s. The song was written and produced by another act who had reached number one on the UK Singles Chart with their only credited entry as Brian and Michael, with Mick Coleman writing the song (under the name D.M. Coleman) and Kevin Parrott ('Brian') producing it. This was because Brian and Michael's 1978 number one hit "Matchstalk Men and Matchstalk Cats and Dogs" had featured an uncredited St Winifred's School Choir as backing vocalists (with the choir going on to release an album called The Matchstalk Children).

The demo was submitted to a talent-spotting feature on the BBC children's television programme Saturday Superstore, where it beat a thousand other entries. Claire and Friends' hit was released on both 7" and 12" vinyl by BBC Records and Tapes (now part of BBC Studios) in 1986, with the 12-inch version also featuring the 'Megaminormix' version of the song. However in January 1987, future Music Week chart analyst Alan Jones reported in his Record Mirror column that only 0.2% of the sales of "It's 'Orrible Being in Love" were on 12-inch, the lowest proportion of any hit single available on the format in 1986. This equated to fewer than 200 copies being sold on the larger format.

After "It's 'Orrible Being in Love (When You're 8½)" was a top 40 success, the BBC followed it up with a solo single by Usher. Called "Superman", this single was credited simply to 'Claire' and continued the story from the original single, but was not a top 75 hit. Claire also issued an album, mostly of cover versions but with a few further originals by Coleman. Entitled Super Claire, this release also was not a commercial success, missing the UK top 100 albums chart. After no further chart successes, the act has remained a one-hit wonder.

In adulthood, Claire Usher (later Usher-McMorrow) obtained a degree in drama and became a dancer, and appeared in the stage show Riverdance on Broadway in 2000, and in the show's UK tour. She later wrote songs for indie pop band Shrag.
