= Denise (Randy & the Rainbows song) =

1963 song by Randy & The Rainbows

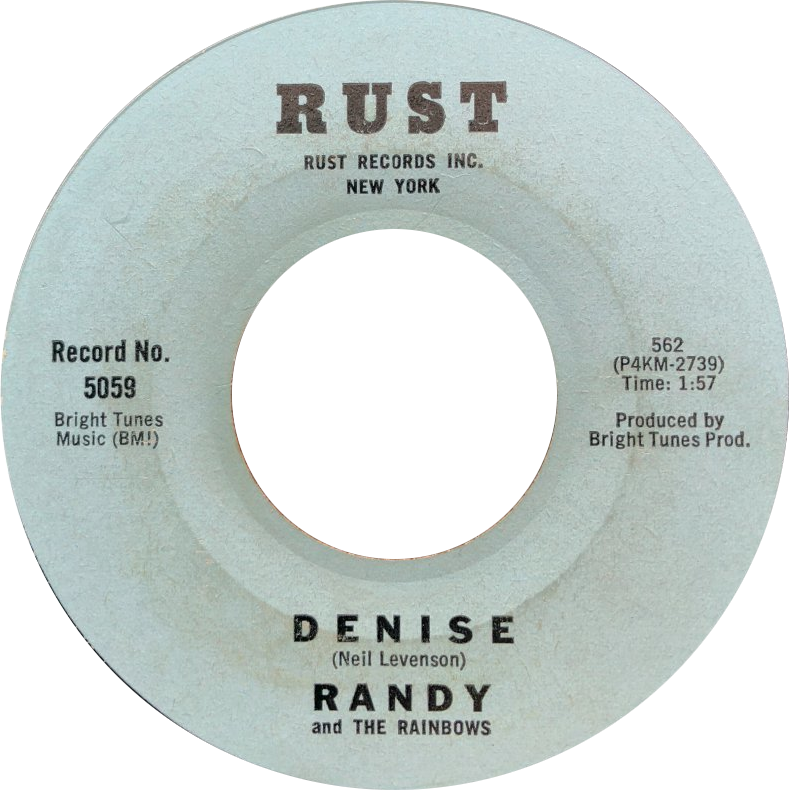
- US vinyl release side-A label

Single by Randy & the Rainbows
- B-side: "Come Back"
- Released: 1963
- Genre: Doo-wop
- Length: 1:57
- Label: Rust Records (US); Stateside (UK)
- Songwriter: Neil Levenson
- Producer: Bright Tunes Productions

Randy & the Rainbows singles chronology
"Denise" (1963)	"Why Do Kids Grow Up" (1963)

"Denise" is a song written by Neil Levenson that was inspired by his childhood friend, Denise Lefrak. In 1963, it became a popular top ten hit on the Billboard Hot 100 chart, when recorded by the American doo-wop group Randy & the Rainbows. A cover version by the American new wave group Blondie, re-titled "Denis", reached number 2 in the UK Singles Chart in 1978.

== Randy & the Rainbows version ==
The American doo-wop group Randy & the Rainbows recorded "Denise" with the producers of The Tokens, releasing it as a single in 1963. The group's name "Randy & the Rainbows" was chosen by the owners of Laurie Records after the group recorded "Denise". Previously, the band had been called "Junior & the Counts" and "The Encores". "Denise" spent seventeen weeks on the Billboard Hot 100 chart, settling at number 10, while peaking at number 18 on the Billboard Hot R&B Singles chart, and number 5 on Canada's CHUM Hit Parade.

The song was ranked number 27 on Billboard's end of year ranking "Top Records of 1963" and number 60 on Cash Box's "Top 100 Chart Hits of 1963".

The opening measures were sampled by Panda Bear and Sonic Boom for their 2022 song "Edge of the Edge."

=== Track listings ===
1. "Denise" (Levenson) – 1:57
2. "Come Back" 2:17

=== Chart performance ===
Chart (1963)	Peak position
Canada (CHUM)	5
US Billboard Hot 100	10
US Billboard Hot R&B Singles	18
US Cash Box Top 100	13

== Blondie version ==
"Denis"
- UK vinyl single picture sleeve

Single by Blondie

from the album Plastic Letters
- B-side: "I'm on E" (US); "Contact in Red Square" / "Kung-Fu Girls" (UK)
- Released: February 1978 (UK); May 1978 (US)
- Recorded: 1977
- Genre: New wave; doo-wop
- Length: 2:18
- Label: Chrysalis
- Songwriter: Neil Levenson
- Producer: Richard Gottehrer

Music video
- "Denis" on YouTube

Blondie singles chronology
"Rip Her to Shreds" (1976)	"Denis" (1978)	"(I'm Always Touched by Your) Presence, Dear" (1978)

"Denis" (using the masculine form of the name in French, with a silent "s") is a 1978 cover of the song by the American new wave band Blondie. This effort helped the band break into the international market. It was featured on the band's second studio album, Plastic Letters (1978), and was the second UK single release by Blondie on Chrysalis Records. Cash Box said it has "recognizable thrashing guitar licks, kick drumming and Deborah [Harry's] bright vocals." Record World said that "The effect is faithful to the original but more than slightly ironic as well."

The initial Blondie version contained a verse with partly improvised lyrics in French by the group's vocalist Debbie Harry. The second, re-recorded version had its debut as a bonus track on EMI UK's 1994 re-issue of Plastic Letters.

"Denis" was released in February 1978 and scored a number 2 in the UK and broke into the Top 20 in most European countries, including number 1 in Netherlands. In the UK, the song was kept at number 2 for three weeks, first by Kate Bush's "Wuthering Heights" and then by Brian and Michael's "Matchstalk Men and Matchstalk Cats and Dogs". Just like "Rip Her to Shreds", the single was issued on both 7" and 12" formats in the UK, and both feature two B-sides, "Contact in Red Square" from Plastic Letters and "Kung-Fu Girls" from Blondie. "Denis" was the only single released in the US from Plastic Letters (with "I'm on E" as the B-side) though it never charted. In 1988, a remixed version of the track was issued as a single from the Blondie/Debbie Harry remix compilation Once More into the Bleach. This time the single reached number 50 in the UK.

=== Track listings ===
1978 Release
UK 7" and 12" (CHS 2204)

1. "Denis" (Levenson) – 2:18
2. "Contact in Red Square" (Destri) – 2:01
3. "Kung-Fu Girls" (Destri, Harry, Valentine) – 2:33

US 7" (CHS 2220)

1. "Denis" (Levenson) – 2:18
2. "I'm on E" (Harry, Stein) – 2:13

1988 Release
UK 7" (CHS 3328)

1. "Denis '88" – 5:26
2. "Rapture" (The Teddy Riley Remix) – 7:02

UK 12" (CHS 12 3328)

1. "Denis" (The Danny D Remix) – 5:26
2. "Rapture" (The Teddy Riley Remix) – 7:02
3. "Rapture" (The Teddy Riley Dub Version) – ?:??

UK CD (CHS CD 3328)

1. "Denis '88" – 5:26
2. "Rapture (The Teddy Riley Remix) – 7:02
3. "Heart Of Glass" – 4:00
4. "Atomic" – 3:32

=== Chart performance ===
==== Weekly charts ====
Chart (1978)	Peak position
Australia (Kent Music Report)	12
Austria (Ö3 Austria Top 40)	10
Belgium (Ultratop 50 Flanders)	1
Europe (Eurochart Hot 100)	1
Germany (GfK)	9
Ireland (IRMA)	3
Netherlands (Dutch Top 40)	1
Netherlands (Single Top 100)	1
Sweden (Sverigetopplistan)	19
UK Singles (OCC)	2

Chart (1988) (Remix)	Peak position
UK Singles (OCC)	50

Chart (1989)	Peak position
Australia (ARIA)	139
New Zealand (Recorded Music NZ)	30

==== Year-end charts ====
Chart (1978)	Rank
Belgium (Ultratop 50 Flanders)	21
Netherlands (Dutch Top 40)	18
Netherlands (Single Top 100)	6
UK (Singles)	16

== Certifications ==
Region	Certification	Certified units/sales
Netherlands (NVPI)	Gold	100,000^{^}
United Kingdom (BPI)	Gold	500,000^{^}
^{^} Shipments figures based on certification alone.

== Georgina Verbaan version ==
"Denis"

Single by Georgina

from the album Sugar Spider
- B-side: "No More Lies"
- Released: 2002
- Label: Jive
- Songwriter: Neil Levenson

Georgina singles chronology
"This Christmas" (2001)	"Denis" (2002)

In 2002, Dutch actress and singer Georgina Verbaan recorded a cover version of "Denis" for her debut studio album Sugar Spider. Her version of the song was issued on the Jive Records label as a single and it reached number 30 on the Dutch Singles Chart.

=== Track listings ===
1. "Denis"
2. "No More Lies"

=== Chart performance ===
Chart (2002)	Peak position
Netherlands (Dutch Top 40)	30
Netherlands (Single Top 100)	30

== See also ==
- List of number-one hits (Belgium)
- List of Dutch Top 40 number-one singles of 1978
- List of European number-one hits of 1978
