= List of number-one singles of 1978 (Ireland) =

This is a list of singles which have reached number one on the Irish Singles Chart in 1978.

Week ending	Song	Artist	Ref.
7 January	"Mull of Kintyre"	Wings	
14 January	"Mull of Kintyre"	Wings	
21 January	"Mull of Kintyre"	Wings	
28 January	"Mull of Kintyre"	Wings	
4 February	"Mull of Kintyre"	Wings	
11 February	"Mull of Kintyre"	Wings	
18 February	"Figaro"	Brotherhood of Man	
25 February	"Take a Chance on Me"	ABBA	
4 March	"The Rare Auld Times"	Danny Doyle	
11 March	"The Rare Auld Times"	Danny Doyle	
18 March	"Wuthering Heights"	Kate Bush	
25 March	"Wuthering Heights"	Kate Bush	
1 April	"Wuthering Heights"	Kate Bush	
8 April	"Matchstalk Men and Matchstalk Cats and Dogs"	Brian and Michael	
15 April	"Matchstalk Men and Matchstalk Cats and Dogs"	Brian and Michael	
22 April	"Matchstalk Men and Matchstalk Cats and Dogs"	Brian and Michael	
29 April	"Night Fever"	The Bee Gees	
6 May	"Night Fever"	The Bee Gees	
13 May	"Night Fever"	The Bee Gees	
20 May	"Rivers of Babylon"	Boney M	
27 May	"Rivers of Babylon"	Boney M	
3 June	"Rivers of Babylon"	Boney M	
10 June	"Rivers of Babylon"	Boney M	
17 June	"Rivers of Babylon"	Boney M	
24 June	"You're the One That I Want"	John Travolta and Olivia Newton-John	
1 July	"You're the One That I Want"	John Travolta and Olivia Newton-John	
8 July	"You're the One That I Want"	John Travolta and Olivia Newton-John	
15 July	"You're the One That I Want"	John Travolta and Olivia Newton-John	
22 July	"You're the One That I Want"	John Travolta and Olivia Newton-John	
29 July	"You're the One That I Want"	John Travolta and Olivia Newton-John	
5 August	"You're the One That I Want"	John Travolta and Olivia Newton-John	
12 August	"You're the One That I Want"	John Travolta and Olivia Newton-John	
19 August	"Substitute"	Clout	
26 August	"You're the One That I Want"	John Travolta and Olivia Newton-John	
2 September	"Three Times a Lady"	Commodores	
9 September	"Three Times a Lady"	Commodores	
16 September	"Three Times a Lady"	Commodores	
23 September	"Summer Night City"	ABBA	
30 September	"One Day at a Time"	Gloria	
7 October	"Summer Nights"	John Travolta and Olivia Newton-John	
14 October	"Summer Nights"	John Travolta and Olivia Newton-John	
21 October	"Summer Nights"	John Travolta and Olivia Newton-John	
28 October	"Summer Nights"	John Travolta and Olivia Newton-John	
4 November	"Sandy"	John Travolta	
11 November	"One Day at a Time"	Gloria	
18 November	"Hopelessly Devoted to You"	Olivia Newton-John	
25 November	"Mary's Boy Child – Oh My Lord"	Boney M	
2 December	"Mary's Boy Child – Oh My Lord"	Boney M	
9 December	"Mary's Boy Child – Oh My Lord"	Boney M	
16 December	"Mary's Boy Child – Oh My Lord"	Boney M	
23 December	"Mary's Boy Child – Oh My Lord"	Boney M	
30 December	"Mary's Boy Child – Oh My Lord"	Boney M	

- 17 Number Ones
- Most weeks at No. 1 (artist): John Travolta (14), Olivia Newton-John (14)
- Most weeks at No. 1 (song): "You're The One That I Want" - John Travolta and Olivia Newton-John (9)
- Most No.1s: John Travolta (3), Olivia Newton-John (3)
- 4 songs from the film Grease reached No. 1: "You're The One That I Want", "Summer Nights", "Sandy" and "Hopelessly Devoted to You"

== See also ==
- 1978 in music
- Irish Singles Chart
- List of artists who reached number one in Ireland
