= Have Yourself a Merry Little Christmas =

1943 song by Hugh Martin and Ralph Blane

Song by Judy Garland in the 1944 musical Meet Me in St. Louis

from the album Meet Me in St. Louis
- Published: 1944 by Leo Feist, Inc.
- Genre: Christmas
- Composer: Hugh Martin
- Lyricist: Ralph Blane

"Have Yourself a Merry Little Christmas" is a song written in 1943 by American composers Hugh Martin and Ralph Blane for the MGM musical Meet Me in St. Louis (1944), in which it was sung by Judy Garland. It has since been covered by many other artists, including Frank Sinatra.

== Background ==
The song was written in 1943 for the film Meet Me in St. Louis, for which MGM had hired Martin and Blane to write several songs. Martin was vacationing in a house in the neighborhood of Southside in Birmingham, Alabama, that his father Hugh Martin had designed for his mother as a honeymoon cottage, located just down the street from his birthplace, and which later became the home of Martin and his family in 1923.

The song was conducted by Georgie Stoll to an orchestration of Conrad Salinger and first appeared in a scene in which a family is distraught by the father's plans to move to New York City for a job promotion, leaving behind their beloved home in St. Louis, Missouri, just before the long-anticipated 1904 World's Fair begins. In a scene set on Christmas Eve, Judy Garland's character, Esther, sings the song to cheer up her despondent five-year-old sister, Tootie, played by Margaret O'Brien.

== Composition ==
Some of Martin's original lyrics were rejected before filming began. When presented with the original draft, Garland, her co-star Tom Drake, and director Vincente Minnelli criticized the song for being depressing, and asked Martin to change the lyrics. Though he initially resisted, ultimately several changes made the song more upbeat. For example, the lines, "It may be your last / Next year we may all be living in the past" became, "Let your heart be light / Next year all our troubles will be out of sight".

Although Ralph Blane is credited with writing the music for many of Martin's songs, Martin claimed in his autobiography that he wrote both music and lyrics to all of the songs in Meet Me in St. Louis and that "all of the so-called Martin and Blane songs (except for Best Foot Forward) were written entirely by me (solo) without help from Ralph or anybody else." His explanation for allowing Blane equal credit for the songs was: "I was reasonably content to let him receive equal screen credit, sheet music credit, ASCAP royalties, etc., mainly because this bizarre situation was caused by my naive and atrocious lack of business acumen."

== Legacy ==
Judy Garland's version of the song, which was also released as a single by Decca Records, became popular among United States troops serving in World War II; her performance at the Hollywood Canteen brought many soldiers to tears. The 1944 version of the song reached No. 27 on the Billboard charts. In 2007, ASCAP ranked it the third most performed Christmas song during the preceding five years that had been written by ASCAP members. In 2004 it finished at No. 76 in AFI's 100 Years...100 Songs rankings of the top tunes in North American cinema.

== Lyrical changes ==
In 1957, when Frank Sinatra approached Martin to record the song, he asked him to revise the lyrics to promote a more uplifting theme; he particularly criticised the lyric "until then we'll have to muddle through somehow," commenting "the name of my album is A Jolly Christmas. Do you think you could jolly up that line for me?" Martin's revised lyric was "hang a shining star upon the highest bough." Martin made several other alterations, changing from the future tense to the present, so that the song's focus is a celebration of present happiness rather than anticipation of a better future. (However, Sinatra had recorded the original song's lyrics in 1948.) On The Judy Garland Show Christmas Special, Garland sang the song to her children Joey and Lorna Luft with Sinatra's revised lyrics.

In 2001, Martin, occasionally active as a pianist with religious ministries since the 1980s, wrote an entirely new set of lyrics to the song with John Fricke, "Have Yourself a Blessed Little Christmas," a religious version of the secular Christmas standard. The song was recorded by female gospel vocalist Del Delker with Martin accompanying her on piano.

In a 2002 interview, NewSong lead singer Michael O'Brien claimed that the line "through the years, we all will be together if the Lord allows," was part of the original song but was purged and replaced with "if the fates allow" to remove religious reference when the song was released. O'Brien stated that while a pastor in a California church in 1990, he had met Martin, who played piano at the church where O'Brien was serving for an evening, and the pastor was told, "That's the original way I wrote it, so I want you to sing it this way."

== Lorna Luft version ==
"Have Yourself a Merry Little Christmas"

Single by Lorna Luft & Judy Garland
- Released: December 4, 1995
- Genre: Holiday
- Length: 3:16
- Label: Carlton Sounds
- Songwriters: Ralph Blane; Hugh Martin
- Producer: Gordon Lorenz

Lorna Luft singles chronology
""Born Again"" (1989)	"Have Yourself a Merry Little Christmas" (1995)	"When You Wish Upon a Star" (2011)

In 1995, American singer Lorna Luft, daughter of Judy Garland, recorded a cover of "Have Yourself a Merry Little Christmas" that was reworked as a "virtual duet" with her mother Judy Garland. It was produced by Gordon Lorenz and released as a CD single only in the UK by Carlton Sounds label. A music video featured Luft performing the song in a studio interspersed with classic footage of Garland singing to a then 11-year-old Luft on the 1963 Christmas episode of her CBS variety television series The Judy Garland Show, all placed on the same screen.

Luft's version of the song peaked at number 100 on the UK singles chart on December 16, 1995.

Track listing

1. "Have Yourself A Merry Little Christmas (Radio Edit)" – 3:16
2. "Me And My Shadow / The Nearness Of You" – 4:38
3. "Have Yourself A Merry Little Christmas (Extended Edit)" – 4:02

== Other versions ==
In 1960, Ella Fitzgerald recorded the song for her holiday album, Ella Wishes You a Swinging Christmas.

Vocal pop trio The Lettermen covered the song on their 1966 album For Christmas This Year.

The Carpenters included the record on their 1978 Christmas album Christmas Portrait. This version gained universal acceptance on the Christmas music radio format, where it was the most played of over 20 different versions of the song in November 2025.

Christina Aguilera recorded a modern cover of the song on her 2000 Christmas album My Kind of Christmas.

Tori Amos included an acoustic version of the song as the B-side to her 1998 single "Spark".

Country singer Kenny Rogers included the song on his 1989 holiday release Christmas in America.

In 1993, Tatsuro Yamashita sang a cover version with orchestra included album Season's Greetings.

Chicago covered this song in their nineteenth studio album Chicago XXV: The Christmas Album with Champlin and Scheff as vocals. This album was re-issued in 2003 as What's It Gonna Be, Santa?

Also in 2003, Whitney Houston recorded the song for her first and only holiday album, One Wish: The Holiday Album.

In 2007, Relient K recorded the song for their second Christmas album, Let It Snow, Baby... Let It Reindeer. Their version peaked at number 11 on the US Hot Christian Songs chart.

in 2007, Bebo Norman recorded the song on his first holiday album, Christmas...From the Realms of Glory.

In 2009, Keyshia Cole reached number 58 on the US Hot R&B/Hip-Hop Songs chart with a version of the song.

In 2011, Michael Bublé's version reached number 98 on the top 100 charts. This version would reach a new peak of 41 in 2023.

In 2013, Kelly Clarkson released a cover version for her sixth studio album Wrapped in Red; the cover was lately considered by Billboard one of the Best Christmas cover song of the 21st century.

In 2014, English singer Sam Smith released a cover version which debuted at number 90 on the Billboard Hot 100, the first time a version of the song had charted on the Billboard list. The song reached top ten on the US and Canadian adult contemporary charts and on the US Holiday chart. It also peaked inside the top forty in Finland, Norway, Sweden, Denmark, Slovakia, the Czech Republic and Switzerland.

In 2016, Josh Groban reached number 1 on the US adult contemporary charts with a version of the song.

In December 2017, at least two new versions of the song were released:

- Sabrina Carpenter sang a cover version.
- Phoebe Bridgers released a cover of this song, which has been included on her various Christmas EPs.

In 2018, at least three new versions of the song were released:

- John Legend reached number 1 on the US adult contemporary charts with a version of the song from his album A Legendary Christmas, featuring Esperanza Spalding on duet vocals.
- Azealia Banks, American rapper and singer songwriter released a cover of this song on her Christmas EP Icy Colors Change.
- New Zealand band The Beths released a single with their cover version.

In 2023, former Fifth Harmony members Ally Brooke and Dinah Jane released a new cover version of the song.

== Charts ==
=== Judy Garland version ===
Chart (2018–2026)	Peak position
Global 200 (Billboard)	165
Latvia (DigiTop100)	45
US Billboard Hot 100	27

=== Ella Fitzgerald version ===
Chart (2011)	Peak position
US Holiday Digital Songs (Billboard)	49

=== Frank Sinatra version ===
Chart (2022–2026)	Peak position
Australia (ARIA)	46
Austria (Ö3 Austria Top 40)	68
Canada Hot 100 (Billboard)	32
Germany (GfK)	92
Global 200 (Billboard)	44
Greece International (IFPI) 1999 remaster	34
Ireland (IRMA)	36
Lithuania (AGATA)	34
Netherlands (Single Top 100)	61
Norway (IFPI Norge)	62
Poland (Polish Streaming Top 100)	84
Portugal (AFP)	46
Sweden (Sverigetopplistan)	73
Switzerland (Schweizer Hitparade)	48
UK Singles (Official Charts)	38

=== Michael Bublé version ===
Chart (2014–2025)	Peak position
Australia (ARIA)	48
Global 200 (Billboard)	52
Italy (FIMI)	20
Netherlands (Single Tip)	6
Norway (IFPI Norge)	82
Portugal (AFP)	168
UK Singles (Official Charts)	78
US Billboard Hot 100	41
US Holiday 100 (Billboard)	24
US Rolling Stone Top 100	25

=== Christina Aguilera version ===
Chart (2011–2018)	Peak position
Lithuania (AGATA)	84
Netherlands (Single Top 100)	95
US Holiday 100 (Billboard)	31
US Holiday Digital Songs (Billboard)	18
US Holiday Streaming Songs (Billboard)	14
US Hot RingMasters (Billboard)	31

=== Sam Smith version ===
Chart (2014–2023)	Peak position
Australia (ARIA)	47
Austria (Ö3 Austria Top 40)	48
Belgium (Ultratip Bubbling Under Flanders)	53
Canada Hot 100 (Billboard)	66
Canada AC (Billboard)	8
Canada Hot AC (Billboard)	49
Czech Republic Singles Digital (ČNS IFPI)	36
Denmark (Tracklisten)	33
Finland (Suomen virallinen lista)	14
France (SNEP)	95
Germany (GfK)	41
Global 200 (Billboard)	106
Greece International (IFPI Greece)	70
Hungary (Stream Top 40)	19
Ireland (IRMA)	46
Latvia (DigiTop100)	54
Lithuania (AGATA)	38
Netherlands (Single Top 100)	30
Norway (VG-lista)	16
Portugal (AFP)	46
Portugal Airplay (AFP)	93
Scottish Singles Sales (Official Charts)	57
Slovakia Singles Digital (ČNS IFPI)	34
South Korea Foreign (Circle)	54
Sweden (Sverigetopplistan)	26
Switzerland (Schweizer Hitparade)	38
UK Singles (Official Charts)	53
US Billboard Hot 100	90
US Adult Contemporary (Billboard)	6
US Holiday 100 (Billboard)	9

=== Relient K ===
==== Weekly charts ====
Chart (2007–08)	Peak position
UK Cross Rhythms Weekly Chart	5
US Christian AC (Billboard)	9
US Hot Christian Songs (Billboard)	11

==== Year-end charts ====
Chart (2007)	Peak position
UK Cross Rhythms Annual Chart	65

Chart (2008)	Peak position
US Christian AC (Radio & Records)	98

== Certifications ==
=== Frank Sinatra version ===
Region	Certification	Certified units/sales
Denmark (IFPI Danmark)	Gold	45,000^{‡}
New Zealand (RMNZ)	Gold	15,000^{‡}
United Kingdom (BPI)	Platinum	600,000^{‡}
^{‡} Sales+streaming figures based on certification alone.

=== Ella Fitzgerald version ===
Region	Certification	Certified units/sales
New Zealand (RMNZ)	Gold	15,000^{‡}
^{‡} Sales+streaming figures based on certification alone.

=== Sam Smith version ===
Region	Certification	Certified units/sales
Australia (ARIA)	Platinum	70,000^{‡}
Canada (Music Canada)	Platinum	80,000^{‡}
Denmark (IFPI Danmark)	Platinum	90,000^{‡}
New Zealand (RMNZ)	Gold	15,000^{‡}
Portugal (AFP)	Gold	10,000^{‡}
United Kingdom (BPI)	Platinum	600,000^{‡}
United States (RIAA)	Gold	500,000^{‡}
^{‡} Sales+streaming figures based on certification alone.

=== Michael Bublé version ===
Region	Certification	Certified units/sales
Denmark (IFPI Danmark)	Gold	45,000^{‡}
Italy (FIMI)	Platinum	100,000^{‡}
New Zealand (RMNZ)	Gold	15,000^{‡}
^{‡} Sales+streaming figures based on certification alone.

== See also ==
- List of number-one adult contemporary singles of 2016 (U.S.)
- List of number-one adult contemporary singles of 2018 (U.S.)
