= List of Dutch Top 40 number-one singles of 1978 =

These hits topped the Dutch Top 40 in 1978.

Issue Date	Song	Artist(s)	Reference
7 January	"Mull of Kintyre"	Wings	
14 January	"Mull of Kintyre"	Wings	
21 January	"Mull of Kintyre"	Wings	
28 January	"Mull of Kintyre"	Wings	
4 February	"If I Had Words"	Scott Fitzgerald & Yvonne Keeley	
11 February	"If I Had Words"	Scott Fitzgerald & Yvonne Keeley	
18 February	"If I Had Words"	Scott Fitzgerald & Yvonne Keeley	
25 February	"If I Had Words"	Scott Fitzgerald & Yvonne Keeley	
4 March	"If I Had Words"	Scott Fitzgerald & Yvonne Keeley	
11 March	"If I Had Words"	Scott Fitzgerald & Yvonne Keeley	
18 March	"Denis"	Blondie	
25 March	"Denis"	Blondie	
1 April	"Denis"	Blondie	
8 April	"Stayin' Alive"	Bee Gees	
15 April	"Stayin' Alive"	Bee Gees	
22 April	"Stayin' Alive"	Bee Gees	
29 April	"Rivers of Babylon"	Boney M.	
6 May	"Rivers of Babylon"	Boney M.	
13 May	"Rivers of Babylon"	Boney M.	
20 May	"Rivers of Babylon"	Boney M.	
27 May	"Rivers of Babylon"	Boney M.	
3 June	"Rivers of Babylon"	Boney M.	
10 June	"Rivers of Babylon"	Boney M.	
17 June	"Rivers of Babylon"	Boney M.	
24 June	"Rivers of Babylon"	Boney M.	
1 July	"You're the One That I Want"	John Travolta & Olivia Newton-John	
8 July	"You're the One That I Want"	John Travolta & Olivia Newton-John	
15 July	"You're the One That I Want"	John Travolta & Olivia Newton-John	
22 July	"You're the One That I Want"	John Travolta & Olivia Newton-John	
29 July	"You're the One That I Want"	John Travolta & Olivia Newton-John	
5 August	"You're the One That I Want"	John Travolta & Olivia Newton-John	
12 August	"You're the One That I Want"	John Travolta & Olivia Newton-John	
19 August	"You're the One That I Want"	John Travolta & Olivia Newton-John	
26 August	"You're the One That I Want"	John Travolta & Olivia Newton-John	
2 September	"You're the Greatest Lover"	Luv'	
9 September	"You're the Greatest Lover"	Luv'	
16 September	"You're the Greatest Lover"	Luv'	
23 September	"You're the Greatest Lover"	Luv'	
30 September	"Grease"	Frankie Valli	
7 October	"Grease"	Frankie Valli	
14 October	"Hopelessly Devoted to You"	Olivia Newton-John	
21 October	"Hopelessly Devoted to You"	Olivia Newton-John	
28 October	"Hopelessly Devoted to You"	Olivia Newton-John	
4 November	"Hopelessly Devoted to You"	Olivia Newton-John	
11 November	"Dreadlock Holiday"	10cc	
18 November	"Dreadlock Holiday"	10cc	
25 November	"Dreadlock Holiday"	10cc	
2 December	"Get Off"	Foxy	
9 December	"Get Off"	Foxy	
16 December	"Trojan Horse"	Luv'	
23 December	"Paradise by the Dashboard Light"	Meat Loaf	
30 December	No Top 40 released		

== See also ==
- 1978 in music
