= List of number-one singles in 1978 (New Zealand) =

This is a list of number-one hit singles in 1978 in New Zealand, starting with the first chart dated, 29 January 1978.

== Chart ==
Key
‡ – Single of New Zealand origin

Week	Artist	Title
29 January 1978	Wings	"Mull of Kintyre"
5 February 1978	Wings	"Mull of Kintyre"
12 February 1978	Wings	"Mull of Kintyre"
19 February 1978	Wings	"Mull of Kintyre"
26 February 1978	Wings	"Mull of Kintyre"
5 March 1978	Wings	"Mull of Kintyre"
12 March 1978	Wings	"Mull of Kintyre"
19 March 1978	Samantha Sang	"Emotion"
26 March 1978	Bee Gees	"Stayin' Alive"
2 April 1978	Easter holiday - no chart	Easter holiday - no chart
9 April 1978	John Rowles	"Tania"^{‡}
16 April 1978	John Rowles	"Tania"^{‡}
23 April 1978	John Rowles	"Tania"^{‡}
30 April 1978	John Rowles	"Tania"^{‡}
7 May 1978	Kate Bush	"Wuthering Heights"
14 May 1978	Kate Bush	"Wuthering Heights"
21 May 1978	Kate Bush	"Wuthering Heights"
28 May 1978	Kate Bush	"Wuthering Heights"
6 June 1978	Kate Bush	"Wuthering Heights"
11 June 1978	John Travolta & Olivia Newton-John	"You're the One That I Want"
18 June 1978	John Travolta & Olivia Newton-John	"You're the One That I Want"
23 June 1978	John Travolta & Olivia Newton-John	"You're the One That I Want"
2 July 1978	John Travolta & Olivia Newton-John	"You're the One That I Want"
9 July 1978	Boney M.	"Rivers of Babylon"
16 July 1978	Boney M.	"Rivers of Babylon"
23 July 1978	Boney M.	"Rivers of Babylon"
30 July 1978	Boney M.	"Rivers of Babylon"
6 August 1978	Boney M.	"Rivers of Babylon"
13 August 1978	Boney M.	"Rivers of Babylon"
20 August 1978	Boney M.	"Rivers of Babylon"
27 August 1978	Boney M.	"Rivers of Babylon"
3 September 1978	Boney M.	"Rivers of Babylon"
10 September 1978	Boney M.	"Rivers of Babylon"
17 September 1978	Boney M.	"Rivers of Babylon"
24 September 1978	Boney M.	"Rivers of Babylon"
1 October 1978	Boney M.	"Rivers of Babylon"
8 October 1978	Boney M.	"Rivers of Babylon"
15 October 1978	Exile	"Kiss You All Over"
22 October 1978	Exile	"Kiss You All Over"
29 October 1978	Exile	"Kiss You All Over"
5 November 1978	Exile	"Kiss You All Over"
12 November 1978	Clout	"Substitute"
19 November 1978	Clout	"Substitute"
26 November 1978	Clout	"Substitute"
3 December 1978	10cc	"Dreadlock Holiday"
10 December 1978	10cc	"Dreadlock Holiday"
17 December 1978	10cc	"Dreadlock Holiday"

== Notes ==
- Number of number-one singles: 10
- Longest run at number-one: "Rivers of Babylon" by Boney M (14 weeks).
- Stayin' Alive and You're the One That I Want are songs both from soundtracks from two movies starring John Travolta.
