= List of European number-one hits of 1978 =

This is a list of the Hitkrant Europarade number-one singles of 1978.

Date	Song	Artist	Ref.
January 5	"Mull of Kintyre"/"Girls' School"	Paul McCartney and Wings	
January 12	"Mull of Kintyre"/"Girls' School"	Paul McCartney and Wings	
January 19	"Mull of Kintyre"/"Girls' School"	Paul McCartney and Wings	
January 26	"Mull of Kintyre"/"Girls' School"	Paul McCartney and Wings	
February 2	"Mull of Kintyre"/"Girls' School"	Paul McCartney and Wings	
February 9	"Mull of Kintyre"/"Girls' School"	Paul McCartney and Wings	
February 16	"Mull of Kintyre"/"Girls' School"	Paul McCartney and Wings	
February 23	"Mull of Kintyre"/"Girls' School"	Paul McCartney and Wings	
March 1	"Mull of Kintyre"/"Girls' School"	Paul McCartney and Wings	
March 8	"Take a Chance on Me"	ABBA	
March 15	"Take a Chance on Me"	ABBA	
March 22	"Take a Chance on Me"	ABBA	
March 29	"Take a Chance on Me"	ABBA	
April 5	"Stayin' Alive"	Bee Gees	
April 12	"Denis"	Blondie	
April 19	"Stayin' Alive"	Bee Gees	
April 26	"Stayin' Alive"	Bee Gees	
May 4	"Rivers of Babylon"/"Brown Girl in the Ring"	Boney M.	
May 11	"Rivers of Babylon"/"Brown Girl in the Ring"	Boney M.	
May 18	"Rivers of Babylon"/"Brown Girl in the Ring"	Boney M.	
May 25	"Rivers of Babylon"/"Brown Girl in the Ring"	Boney M.	
June 1	"Rivers of Babylon"/"Brown Girl in the Ring"	Boney M.	
June 8	"Rivers of Babylon"/"Brown Girl in the Ring"	Boney M.	
June 15	"Rivers of Babylon"/"Brown Girl in the Ring"	Boney M.	
June 22	"Rivers of Babylon"/"Brown Girl in the Ring"	Boney M.	
June 29	"Rivers of Babylon"/"Brown Girl in the Ring"	Boney M.	
July 6	"Rivers of Babylon"/"Brown Girl in the Ring"	Boney M.	
July 13	"Rivers of Babylon"/"Brown Girl in the Ring"	Boney M.	
July 20	"Rivers of Babylon"/"Brown Girl in the Ring"	Boney M.	
July 27	"Rivers of Babylon"/"Brown Girl in the Ring"	Boney M.	
August 3	"You're The One That I Want"	John Travolta & Olivia Newton-John	
August 10	"You're The One That I Want"	John Travolta & Olivia Newton-John	
August 17	"You're The One That I Want"	John Travolta & Olivia Newton-John	
August 24	"You're The One That I Want"	John Travolta & Olivia Newton-John	
August 31	"You're The One That I Want"	John Travolta & Olivia Newton-John	
September 7	"You're The One That I Want"	John Travolta & Olivia Newton-John	
September 14	"You're The One That I Want"	John Travolta & Olivia Newton-John	
September 21	"You're The One That I Want"	John Travolta & Olivia Newton-John	
September 28	"You're The One That I Want"	John Travolta & Olivia Newton-John	
October 5	"You're The One That I Want"	John Travolta & Olivia Newton-John	
October 12	"Summer Night City"	ABBA	
October 19	"Summer Nights"	John Travolta & Olivia Newton-John	
October 26	"Summer Nights"	John Travolta & Olivia Newton-John	
November 2	"Summer Nights"	John Travolta & Olivia Newton-John	
November 9	"Summer Nights"	John Travolta & Olivia Newton-John	
November 16	"Summer Nights"	John Travolta & Olivia Newton-John	
November 23	"Summer Nights"	John Travolta & Olivia Newton-John	
November 30	"Summer Nights"	John Travolta & Olivia Newton-John	
December 7	"Summer Nights"	John Travolta & Olivia Newton-John	
December 14	"Bicycle Race"/"Fat Bottomed Girls"	Queen	
December 21	"Mary's Boy Child/Oh My Lord"	Boney M.	
December 28	"Mary's Boy Child/Oh My Lord"	Boney M.	
