= Sugar Spider =

Studio album by Georgina
- Released: 27 September 2002
- Recorded: 2002
- Genre: Pop, dance music
- Label: Zomba / Jive
- Producer: Fluitsma & van Tijn; K.R. Westerborg; Martijn Schimmer; Michael Buyens; Nando Eweg

Singles from Sugar Spider
- 1. "If You Want Me" Released: 2000; 2. "Ritmo (feat. Janet)" Released: 2001; 3. "Yo quiero bailar" Released: 2001; 4. "Denis" Released: 2002

Sugar Spider is a 2002 album by Dutch artist Georgina Verbaan credited on the album as Georgina, her mononym. It was released on Jive Records and is the debut and only studio album by Verbaan.

== Track listing ==
(writers in parentheses)

1. "Let's Ride" (A. van Olm) - 3:50
2. "New York, Paris, Rome" (A. Volley, M. Vishnudatt) - 4:01
3. "Denis" (Neil Levenson) - 3:11
4. "Let Me Be The One (Fluitsma & van Tijn) - 3:00
5. "Xtremely" (Fluitsma & van Tijn, Nando Eweg, Xander Hubrecht) - 3:39
6. "No More Lies" (Ed van Otterdijke) - 3:50
7. "Perfect" (M. Nevin) - 3:33
8. "Look to the Future" (J. Gordon, L. Dissing) - 4:05
9. "Easier Said Than Done" (Fluitsma & van Tijn, Georgina Verbaan, Nando Eweg) - 3:06
10. "99 Luftballons" (Carlo Karges, Fahrenkrog-Petersen) - 3:14
11. "Ritmo" (Martijn Schimmer) - 3:22 (bonus track)
12. "Yo quiero bailar" - (T. Ten, X. Ten - English lyrics by Martijn Schimmer) - 3:44 (bonus track)
13. "Love Is On Its Way" (Martijn Schimmer) - 3:31 (bonus track)

Music videos

1. "Ritmo"
2. "Yo quiero bailar"

== Singles ==
The charting singles from the album were:

1. "If You Want Me"
2. "Ritmo" (featuring Janet)
3. "Yo quiero bailar"
4. "Denis"

== Charts ==
Chart (2002)	Peak position
Netherlands Albums Chart	70
