= Randy & the Rainbows =

American doo-wop group

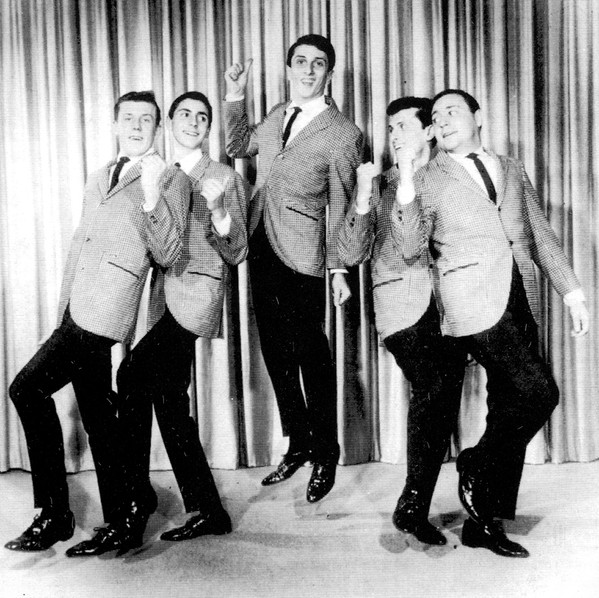
- Randy & The Rainbows c. 1963

Background information
- Also known as: Later performed as: Madison Street; Triangle; Them and Us
- Origin: Maspeth, Queens, New York, United States
- Genres: Doo-wop
- Years active: 1962–present
- Members: Original members (1962–1963): Dominick "Randy" Safuto; Frank Safuto; Mike Zero; Sal Zero; Ken Arcipowski Randy Safuto's Randy & The Rainbows: Randy Safuto; Frank Safuto; Anthony Vara; Charlie Rocco Mike Zero's Randy & The Rainbows: Mike Zero; Jack Vitale; Vinny Carella; Jimmy Bense

Randy & the Rainbows are an American doo-wop group from Maspeth, New York.

== History ==
The group was formed in 1962 in Maspeth, Queens, and featured two pairs of siblings, along with a fifth member. The Safuto brothers, Dominick and Frank, had previously sung in the group The Dialtones. They recorded with the producers of The Tokens, releasing the single "Denise" in 1963. The name "Randy and the Rainbows" was chosen by the owners of Laurie Records after the group recorded "Denise". The group had previously been called "Junior & the Counts" and "The Encores".

"Denise" spent 17 weeks on the Billboard Hot 100, reaching No. 10, while reaching No. 18 on Billboard's "Hot R&B Singles", and No. 5 on Canada's CHUM Hit Parade. The song was written by Neil Levenson, and was inspired by his childhood friend, Denise Lefrak. In the late 1970s, the song became a European hit for Blondie, with the title changed to "Denis". Randy & The Rainbows' follow-up single, "Why Do Kids Grow Up", barely scraped into the pop charts at No. 97, and the group never charted again.

== Members ==
The original 1962 line-up was made up of:

- Dominick "Randy" Safuto (April 19, 1947 – October 16, 2018, aged 71)
- Frank Safuto
- Mike Zero
- Sal Zero (October 10, 1942 - November 19, 2019, aged 77)
- Ken Arcipowski (May 26, 1944 – March 23, 2011, aged 66)
- Bill Pascali

== Later years ==
They continued to perform under several other names (Madison Street, Triangle, Them and Us), and toured in subsequent years with The Spinners, Little Anthony and the Imperials, Tony Orlando, Blood, Sweat & Tears, Freddie Roman, Jay Black, Pat Cooper, The Beach Boys, Dionne Warwick, and The Four Seasons. Bill Pascali joined forces with Randy Safuto and Randy and the Rainbows (1982 - 1992) and has spent over 10 years as Randy's first tenor and keyboardist, with several releases, “A Brighter Day”, “It’s Christmas Once Again” and “Happy Teenager” on Crystal Ball Records, and Resnik Music Group as well. They released a new album, entitled Play Ball, in 2001 on producer Jimmy Wisner's label WizWorks.

== Similarly named groups ==
Two groups now exist carrying the same name, one led by the Safuto brothers (Randy and Frank), the other led by Mike Zero.

Randy Safuto's Randy & The Rainbows

This is made up of the Safuto brothers, members are as follows:

- Randy Safuto (died October 16, 2018)
- Frank Safuto
- Anthony Vara (died December 26, 2016)
- Charlie Rocco
- Bill Pascali

The group appeared on the 2001 PBS special Doo Wop 51; it featured Randy's group plus Mike Zero.

Mike Zero's Randy & The Rainbows

This is made up of

- Mike Zero
- Jack Vitale
- Vinny Carella (died 2012)
- Jimmy Bense (joined 1990)
- Dave Grant
- Steve Klein
- Bobby Taylor
- Barry Titone

== Discography ==
=== Albums ===
- 1982: C'mon Let's Go!
- 2001: Play Ball

=== Singles ===
Year	Title	Peak chart positions		Record Label	B-side	Album
Year	Title	US Pop	US R&B	Record Label	B-side	Album
1963	"Denise"	10	18	Rust	"Come Back"	
1963	"Why Do Kids Grow Up"	97	—	Rust	"She's My Angel"	
1964	"Happy Teenager"	—	—	Rust	"Dry Your Eyes"	
1964	"Little Star"	133	—	Rust	"Sharin'"	
1965	"Joyride"	—	—	Rust	"Little Hot Rod Suzie"	
1966	"Lovely Lies"	—	—	Mike	"I'll Forget Her Tomorrow"	
1966	"He's a Fugitive"	—	—	Mike	"Quarter to Three"	
1967	"I'll Be Seeing You"	—	—	B.T. Puppy	"Oh to Get Away"	
1982	"Fourever Seasons"	—	—	Fox-Moor	"Ain't No Mountain High Enough"	
1982	"Try the Impossible"	—	—	Ambient Sound	"Debbie"	C'mon Let's Go!
