= Rivers of Babylon =

1970 Rastafari song by the Melodians

"Rivers of Babylon" is a Rastafari song written and recorded by Brent Dowe and Trevor McNaughton of the Jamaican reggae group the Melodians in 1970. The lyrics are adapted from the texts of Psalms 19 and 137 in the Hebrew Bible. The Melodians' original version of the song appeared on the soundtrack album for the 1972 movie The Harder They Come, which made it internationally known.

The song was popularized in Europe by the 1978 Boney M. cover version, which was awarded a platinum disc and is one of the top-ten, all-time best-selling singles in the UK. The B-side of the single, "Brown Girl in the Ring", also became a hit.

== Background ==
=== Biblical psalms ===
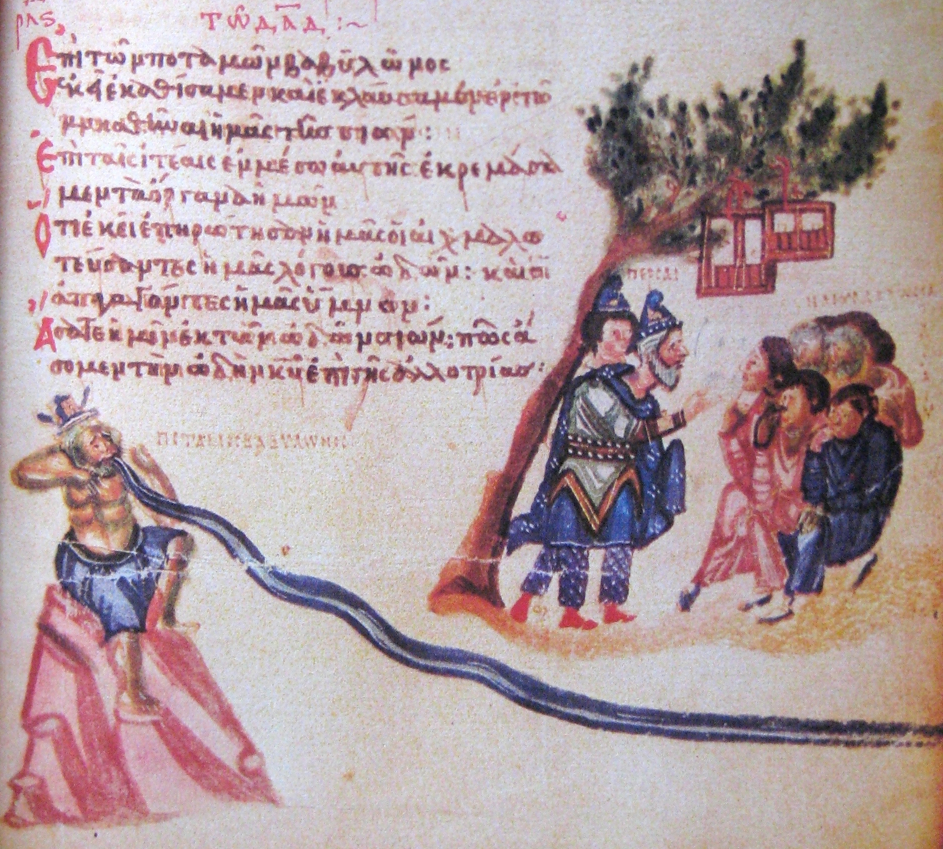
Illustration of the weeping by the rivers of Babylon from the Chludov Psalter (9th century)

The song is based on the Biblical Psalm 137:1–4, a hymn expressing the lamentations of the Jewish people in exile following the Babylonian conquest of Jerusalem in 586 BC:

By the rivers of Babylon, there we sat down, yea, we wept, when we remembered Zion ... They carried us away in captivity requiring of us a song ... Now how shall we sing the LORD's song in a strange land?

The namesake rivers of Babylon (in present-day Iraq) are the Tigris and Euphrates rivers. The song also has words from Psalm 19:14:

Let the words of my mouth, and the meditation of my heart, be acceptable in thy sight...

It is one of a few pop songs whose lyrics come directly from the Bible (see also "Turn! Turn! Turn!" by Pete Seeger, "40" by U2, and "The Lord's Prayer" by Sister Janet Mead). The melody bears a strong resemblance to "How Dry I Am".

=== Rastafari ===
In the Rastafarian faith, the term "Babylon" is used for any political system which is either oppressive or unjust. Rastafarians also use "Babylon" to refer to the police, often seen as a source of oppression because they arrest members for the use of marijuana (which is sacramental for Rastafarians). Therefore, "By the rivers of Babylon" refers to living in a repressive society and the longing for freedom, just like the Israelites in captivity. Rastafarians also identify themselves as belonging to the Twelve Tribes of Israel. The original version specifically refers to Rastafarian belief in Haile Selassie, by changing references to "the Lord" in the Biblical text to "Far-I" (a shortened form of his name before he was crowned, Ras Täfari) and "King Alpha". Both terms refer to Selassie (Selassie's wife Menen Asfaw is known as Queen Omega). In addition, the term "the wicked" replaces the neutral "they" of Psalm 137 in the line "they that carried us away captive required of us a song...". According to David Stowe,

Brent Dowe, the lead singer of the Melodians, told Kenneth Bilby that he had adapted Psalm 137 to the new reggae style because he wanted to increase the public's consciousness of the growing Rastafarian movement and its calls for black liberation and social justice. Like the Afro-Protestant Revival services, traditional Rastafarian worship often included psalm singing and hymn singing, and Rastas typically modified the words to fit their own spiritual conceptions; Psalm 137 was among their sacred chants.

== Melodians version ==
After its release in 1970, the song quickly became well known in Jamaica. According to Brent Dowe, the song was initially banned by the Jamaican government because "its overt Rastafarian references ('King Alpha' and 'O Far-I') were considered subversive and potentially inflammatory". Leslie Kong, the group's producer, attacked the government for banning a song with words taken almost entirely from the Bible, stating that the Psalms had been "sung by Jamaican Christians since time immemorial". The government lifted the ban. After that, it took only three weeks to become a number-one hit in the Jamaican charts.

It reached an international audience thanks to the soundtrack album of the 1972 film The Harder They Come, which is credited with having "brought reggae to the world". The song was later used in the 1999 film Bringing Out the Dead and the 2010 film Jack Goes Boating. The song is also featured in Season 3 – Episode 2 of the TV series Outer Banks.

== Boney M. version ==
"Rivers of Babylon"

Single by Boney M.

from the album Nightflight to Venus
- B-side: "Brown Girl in the Ring"
- Released: 3 April 1978
- Recorded: 1977
- Genre: Disco
- Length: 4:21 (album version); 4:00 (single version)
- Label: Hansa (FRG); Sire (US); Atlantic (UK/AUS)
- Songwriters: Brent Dowe; Trevor McNaughton; Frank Farian; Reyam
- Producer: Frank Farian

Boney M. singles chronology
"Belfast" (1977)	"Rivers of Babylon" / "Brown Girl in the Ring" (1978)	"Rasputin" (1978)

Music video
- "Rivers of Babylon" (TopPop, 1978) on YouTube

"Rivers of Babylon" was covered in 1978 by Germany-based disco band Boney M. The single stayed at the no. 1 position in the UK for five weeks and was also the group's only significant US chart entry, peaking at no. 30 in the Pop charts. Boney M.'s version of the song remains one of the top ten all-time best-selling singles in the UK, where it is one of only seven songs to have sold over 2 million copies. In Canada, the song was a top 25 hit on the RPM magazine's Top 100 singles chart and reached no. 9 on the Adult Contemporary chart. The song also reached No. 1 on the South African Springbok chart, where it remained for a total of 11 weeks, making it the No. 1 song on that country's year end charts. The song was the first single from the band's equally successful 1978 album, Nightflight to Venus. Some controversy arose when the first single pressings only credited Frank Farian and Reyam (aka Hans-Jörg Mayer) of Boney M.; after an agreement with Dowe and McNaughton, these two were also credited on later pressings.

The Rastafarian language was excised from the lyrics for the Boney M. version. Although the group performed an early mix of the song on a German TV show and sang "How can we sing King Alpha's song" as in the Melodians version, it was changed to "the Lord's song", restoring the original, biblical words, in the versions that were to be released. To fit the meter, "O Far-I" became "here tonight" rather than the original, biblical "O Lord".

=== Censorship ===
Under Saddam Hussein’s regime, the song was banned in Iraq, with authorities prohibiting its broadcast and restricting its circulation due to its references to Zion. At a Palestinian music festival in Ramallah, organizers asked Boney M not to perform "Rivers of Babylon", deeming it inappropriate due to its references to the Jewish people's exile and their yearning to return to the biblical land of Israel. Following its release in 1970, the song was briefly banned from radio airplay in Jamaica due to concerns over its Rastafarian themes, which authorities viewed as potentially subversive, before later gaining widespread popularity.

=== Different versions ===
Along with "Ma Baker", "Rivers of Babylon" helped establish what was to become a habit of Boney M. singles – namely that the original pressings featured an early version that was soon replaced by a more widely available mix.

The initial single mix of "Rivers of Babylon" is most notable for lead singer Liz Mitchell's ad-libs ("Daughters of Babylon, you got to sing a song, sing a song of love, yeah yeah yeah yeah yeah") between the two verses. On subsequent single pressings, only the 'yeah's were retained. However, the full ad-libs re-emerged in the US-only 12" version, and the original earlier fade-out point is kept in the album version.

The single mix differs from the album version by having Liz Mitchell singing all of the verse "Let the words of our mouth ..." with Frank Farian; on the LP, Farian sings the first half of this as a solo part. Additionally, it edits out the instrumental passage before the last "humming" part and fades out a little later ("Oooooh, have the power... yeah yeah yeah yeah" can only be heard in full in the single mix) despite being slightly shorter overall. Linda Ronstadt included a version of the song on her 1976 album, Hasten Down the Wind.

=== "Brown Girl in the Ring" ===
The single's B-side, "Brown Girl in the Ring", was a traditional Caribbean nursery rhyme. When "Rivers of Babylon" had slipped to no. 20 in the UK charts, radio stations suddenly flipped the single, causing "Brown Girl in the Ring" to go all the way to no. 2 and become a hit in its own right. Early single pressings feature the full-length, 4:18 version, whose final chorus has a section that was later edited out. The single mix is also slightly different from the album version in that the latter features steel drums on the outro riff of the song, while the single mix doesn't.

"Brown Girl in the Ring" was also issued separately in Canada as an A-side in the summer of 1979. It reached no. 8 on the Canadian AC chart in July 1979, becoming the third Boney M. song to reach the top 10 on that chart after "Rivers of Babylon" and "Rasputin". On RPM's Top 100 singles chart, the song stalled at no. 79.

Liz Mitchell had previously recorded "Brown Girl in the Ring" in 1975 with the group Malcolm's Locks, which had her ex-boyfriend Malcolm Magaron as the lead singer. Arranger Peter Herbolzheimer accused Frank Farian of stealing his arrangement for the song. The court case ran for more than 20 years in Germany.

=== Charts and certifications ===
==== Weekly charts ====
Weekly chart performance for "Rivers of Babylon"
Chart (1978)	Peak position
Argentina	4
Australia (Kent Music Report)	1
Austria (Ö3 Austria Top 40)	1
Belgium (Ultratop 50 Flanders)	1
Canada Adult Contemporary (RPM)	9
Canada Top Singles (RPM)	24
Europe (Eurochart Hot 100)	1
Finland (Suomen Virallinen)	1
France (IFOP)	1
Ireland (IRMA)	1
Italy (Musica e dischi)	11
Mexico (Billboard Hits of the World)	1
Netherlands (Dutch Top 40)	1
Netherlands (Single Top 100)	1
New Zealand (Recorded Music NZ)	1
Norway (VG-lista)	1
South Africa (Springbok Radio)	1
Spain (AFE)	1
Sweden (Sverigetopplistan)	1
Switzerland (Schweizer Hitparade)	1
UK Singles (Official Charts)	1
US Billboard Hot 100	30
US Billboard Adult Contemporary	35
US Cash Box	54
West Germany (GfK)	1
Zimbabwe (ZIMA)	1

==== Year-end charts ====
Year-end chart performance for "Rivers of Babylon"
Chart (1978)	Position
Australia (Kent Music Report)	3
Austria (Ö3 Austria Top 40)	1
Belgium (Ultratop 50 Flanders)	3
France (IFOP)	7
Netherlands (Dutch Top 40)	3
Netherlands (Single Top 100)	1
New Zealand (Recorded Music NZ)	1
South Africa (Springbok Radio)	1
Switzerland (Schweizer Hitparade)	1
UK Singles (OCC)	1
West Germany (Media Control Charts)	2

==== Sales and certifications ====
Sales and certifications for "Rivers of Babylon"
Region	Certification	Certified units/sales
Australia (ARIA)	Gold	50,000
Austria	—	30,000
Belgium	—	200,000
France (SNEP)	Gold	1,000,000
Germany (BVMI)	Platinum	2,000,000
Ireland	—	54,000
Mexico	—	1,000,000
Netherlands (NVPI)	Gold	300,000
New Zealand (RMNZ)	Platinum	30,000^{‡}
Switzerland	—	128,000
United Kingdom (BPI)	Platinum	2,032,656
United States	—	150,000
Summaries
Europe	—	7,000,000
Latin America	—	2,500,000
Worldwide	—	10,000,000
^{‡} Sales+streaming figures based on certification alone.

=== 1988 remix ===
"Rivers of Babylon (Remix)"/"Mary's Boy Child / Oh My Lord (Remix)"

Single by Boney M.

from the album Greatest Hits of All Times – Remix '88
- A-side: "Mary's Boy Child / Oh My Lord (Remix)"
- Released: 1988
- Label: Hansa (FRG)
- Producer: Frank Farian

Boney M. singles chronology
"Bang Bang Lulu" (1986)	"Rivers of Babylon (Remix)" / "Mary's Boy Child / Oh My Lord (Remix)" (1988)	"Megamix" (1988)

"Rivers of Babylon"/"Mary's Boy Child / Oh My Lord" is a 1988 remix single that was issued to launch the group's reunion. (Boney M. had split up in 1986, their 10th anniversary.) The double A-side single contained new mixes of both songs. Although the remix album from which both sides of the single were taken sold well, the single failed to chart.

=== German version ===
In 1978, "Die Legende von Babylon" ("The Legend of Babylon") was published by Ariola, featuring Bruce Low singing in German language at the same tune. The lyrics however didn't refer to the Babylonian captivity but to the tower of Babel in the book of Genesis.

=== Parodies ===
The song was parodied by the Barron Knights in their UK comedy hit "A Taste of Aggro" (1978), in which the lyrics are changed to "There's a dentist in Birmingham, he fixed my crown / And as I slept, he filled my mouth with iron." The song was their biggest hit, reaching no. 3 in the UK charts.

The song was also parodied by an Australian Folk Musical Group Redgum, titled "Fabulon" in the album Caught in the Act.

== See also ==
- "Va, pensiero", story of Jewish exiles from Judea
- List of best-selling singles in Germany
- List of best-selling singles by year in the United Kingdom
- List of Dutch Top 40 number-one singles of 1978
- List of European number-one hits of 1978
- List of number-one hits of 1978 (Germany)
- List of number-one singles in Australia during the 1970s
- List of number-one singles of 1978 (France)
- List of number-one singles of 1978 (Ireland)
- List of number-one hits of 1978 (Mexico)
- List of number-one singles in 1978 (New Zealand)
- List of number-one singles from 1968 to 1979 (Switzerland)
- List of number-one singles and albums in Sweden
- List of UK Singles Chart number ones of the 1970s
- VG-lista 1964 to 1994
