= Brian and Michael =

British music duo (1976–2023)

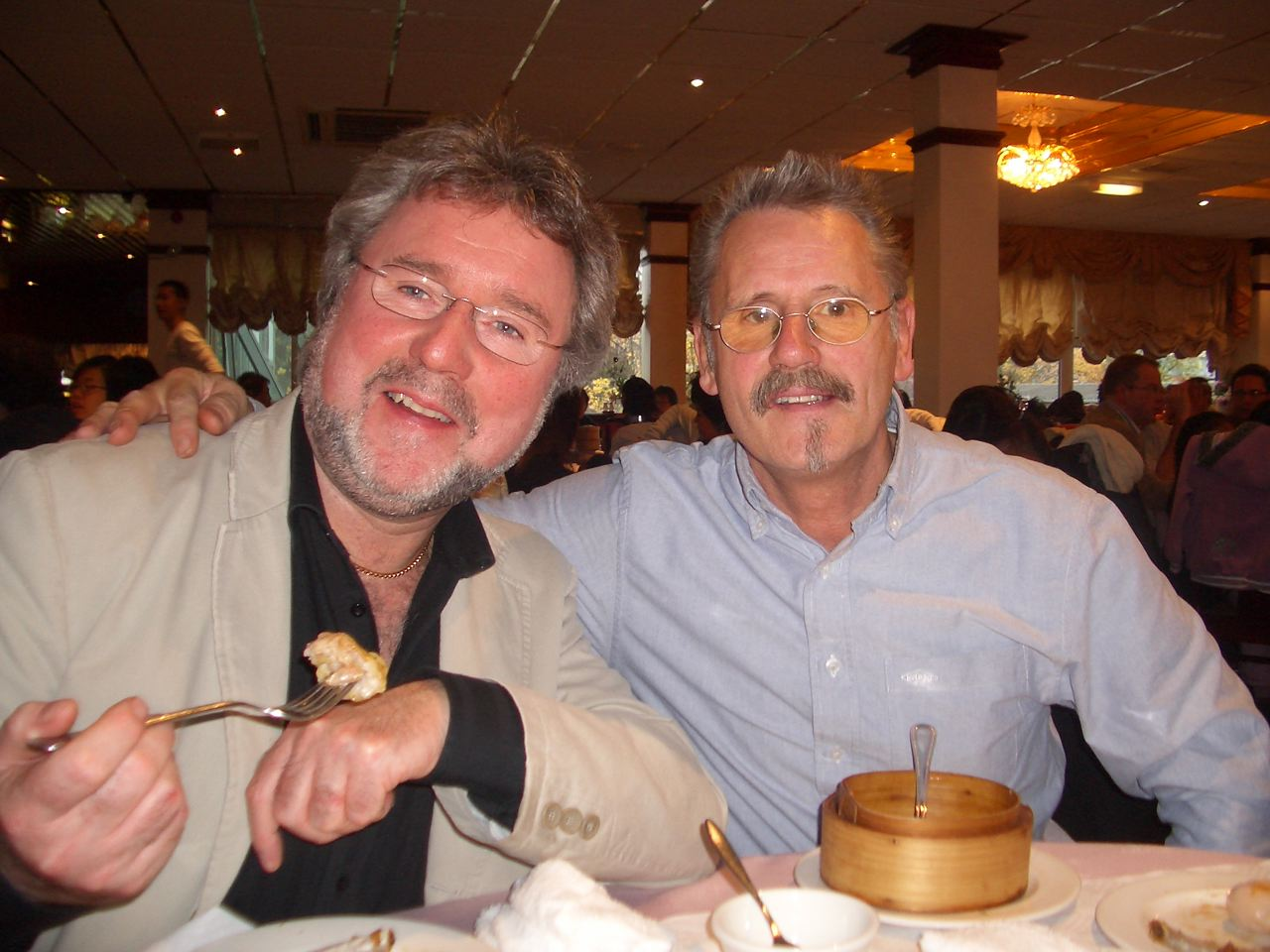
- Coleman (right) and Parrott in 2006

Background information
- Origin: Ancoats, England
- Genres: Folk, pop
- Years active: 1976–2023
- Past members: Michael Coleman; Brian Burke; Kevin Parrott

Brian and Michael were a British music duo best known for their 1978 UK number one hit single, "Matchstalk Men and Matchstalk Cats and Dogs". Without further chart entries, they remain one-hit wonders in the UK. They comprised two members: Michael Coleman and Kevin Parrott.

== Career ==
The duo had originally been members of a Stax-style soul band called The Big Sound, working mainly in Denmark, Sweden and Germany, but also touring Israel in 1967. The Big Sound had previously backed singer Karol Keyes, now known as the actress Luan Peters. In Denmark, the band were the backing group to the Danish singer Rock Nalle.

The act Brian and Michael was originally called Burke and Jerk, a comedy duo composed of Brian Burke and Mick Coleman, formed in 1976, some nine years after Coleman had left The Big Sound. During the intervening years Parrott and Coleman had stayed friends, and Coleman had followed Parrott's recording career as lead guitarist with Manchester rock band Oscar, who were signed to DJM Records.

When Coleman first wrote "Matchstalk Men and Matchstalk Cats and Dogs", he took the song to Parrott. The latter borrowed the estimated £1,000 to produce the record which was recorded at Pluto Studios in Stockport, in the same building as Strawberry Studios. Pluto Studios was owned by the former Herman's Hermits rhythm guitar player Keith Hopwood. The song was recorded over three sessions starting on 25 September 1977. The brass band on the recording is Tintwistle Brass Band, from the village in Derbyshire where Parrott lived at the time.

Parrott tried without success to get a release with several record labels, but eventually secured a recording contract with Pye Records. However, Brian Burke left the act just a couple of weeks after "Matchstalk Men and Matchstalk Cats and Dogs" was released on 25 November 1977, citing "family reasons".

Parrott left Oscar after 10 years, and teamed up with Coleman again, in the live act to try to keep up the promotion of "Matchstalk Men", and had to be billed as 'Brian'. The first run of records had already been pressed as Brian and Michael before Burke had left the act.

After their success, Brian and Michael released a follow-up single, "Evensong" (written by Phil Hampson), and an album, The Matchstalk Men, followed by a second album named We Can Count Our Friends on One Hand. Backing singers St Winifred's School Choir released an unsuccessful album entitled The Matchstalk Children.

Coleman and Parrott remained in the music industry as songwriters and record producers for themselves and other acts. Other chart success as writers/producers were with "The Sparrow" (The Ramblers, No 11 in 1979), and Claire and Friends' "It's 'Orrible Being in Love when You're Eight and a Half" (Number 13 in 1986). Coleman also wrote the hit song "Hold My Hand" for Ken Dodd.

St Winifred's School Choir had their own number one hit with "There's No One Quite Like Grandma" during Christmas time in 1980.

In an article in The Guardian newspaper, Parrott said "we started performing together again in 2002, and are incredibly moved by the reception we get. We did a reunion concert at Salford's Lowry Centre with the original St Winifred's girls."

In February 2012, Brian and Michael decided to form a new band and recruited their respective brothers, former Dooleys drummer Nigel Parrott, and Tim Coleman as lead vocalist. They also added a keyboard player – The Dakotas keysman, Toni Baker, made several guest appearances – and Ian Jenkins took over the role in 2014.

In 'The Matchstalk Men', Coleman returned to his bass playing roots, Parrott to his rock guitar style, and the band performed songs from the two Brian and Michael albums, plus "many of the favourites we grew up with during our 1950s and 1960s formative years".

2015 celebrated 50 years for Kevin Parrott and Mick Coleman as musical colleagues.

Following Tim Coleman's retirement from the band in 2016, the position of lead vocalist with 'The Matchstalk Men' was taken by Steve Pickering (aka comedian Dudley Doolittle), an old friend of Parrott and Coleman's who actually compèred a show at the London Palladium on the night, in 1978, that Brian and Michael topped the bill as 'number one' recording artists.

Ian Jenkins retired from the business in 2017 and his place on keyboards was, once again, filled by Toni Baker.

Kevin Parrott died from a stroke in Stockport, on 9 October 2023, at the age of 77.

== Discography ==
=== Studio albums ===
- The Matchstalk Men (1978), Pye
- We Can Count Our Friends on One Hand (1979), Pye

=== Singles ===
Year	Song	UK	Certifications
1977	"Matchstalk Men and Matchstalk Cats and Dogs"	1	BPI: Gold
1978	"Evensong"	—	
1978	"Mam When's Mi Dad Coming Home?"	—	
1979	"You Don't Call Me Darling"	—	
1979	"Bottle of Gin"	—	
1979	"Pinocchio"	—	
1983	"Mama"	93	
"—" denotes releases that did not chart.

== See also ==
- List of one-hit wonders on the UK Singles Chart
- List of artists who reached number one on the UK Singles Chart
- List of UK Singles Chart number ones of the 1970s
- List of number-one singles of 1978 (Ireland)
- List of performers on Top of the Pops

Preceded by "Wuthering Heights" by Kate Bush	UK number one single 8 April 1978 – 22 April 1978	Succeeded by "Night Fever" by Bee Gees
