= Jennifer Hennessy =

English actress

- Born: Jennifer Hayes; 1970 (age 55–56); Stockport, England
- Education: Royal Central School of Speech and Drama
- Occupation: Actress

Jennifer Hennessy (born Jennifer Hayes in 1970) is an English actress. She has made numerous television appearances, including as Mrs. Brazendale in the BBC TV series Lilies.

Hennessy trained for three years at the Central School of Speech and Drama, graduating in 1992. She has since appeared in a number of theatrical roles, as well as on television, including the character of Jude in The Office; Julie, the man-hating shop-assistant, in the "Fockin Mokky Bokka" episode of Two Pints of Lager and a Packet of Crisps; and, in 2007, as Valerie Brannigan (the wife of Ardal O'Hanlon's character, Thomas Kincade Brannigan) in "Gridlock", an episode of Doctor Who, playing a vet in the BBC3 comedy "Pulling" (2008) and in the BBC mini-series South Riding in 2011.

As a child, Hennessy was a member of the St Winifred's School Choir which reached number one on the UK Singles Chart in 1980 with the song "There's No One Quite Like Grandma". She also starred in BBC One drama Dickensian, a series based on Charles Dickens' characters. She played the role of Emily Cratchit, a character in A Christmas Carol. She returned to Doctor Who in 2017, playing Moira, the foster mother of Bill Potts.

== Filmography ==
=== Film ===
Year	Title	Role	Notes
1998	The Tichborne Claimant	Cousin Alicia	
1999	Dead End	Dr. Browning's Nurse	

=== Television ===
Year	Title	Role	Notes
1994	Pauline Calf's Wedding Video	Other Pauline	
1996	Hetty Wainthropp Investigates	Cheryl Wright	Episode: "Poison Pen"
1997–1999	Coronation Street	D.C. Kay	3 episodes
1998	The Broker's Man	WPC	Episode: "Swansong"
1998	Undercover Heart	Saffron	
1998	Casualty	Gemma Fisher	Episode: "One from the Heart"
1998–2005	The Bill	Julie Houghton; Becky Foster; Marion Clarke	3 episodes
1999	People Like Us		Episode: "The Solicitor"
2000	Clocking Off	Young Doctor	Episode: "The Leaches' Story"
2001	World of Pub	Various	4 episodes
2001	Swallow	Jenny Lawler	
2001	Buried Treasure	Jill Hellings	TV film
2001	Micawber	Rebecca Rideout	
2002	Barbara	Melanie	Episode: "Crime"
2002	Flesh and Blood	Vicky	
2002	The Office	Jude	3 episodes
2003	The Second Coming	Female Reporter	
2003	Loving You	Mrs. Smithson	
2003	William and Mary	Sal Jordan	Episode: No. 1.1
2003	Two Pints of Lager and a Packet of Crisps	Julie	Episode: "Fockin Mokky Bokka"
2003	Danielle Cable: Eyewitness	DS Libby Marks	
2003	Emmerdale	Juanita Taylor	3 episodes
2003	A Touch of Frost	Elizabeth Drew	Episode: "Held in Trust"
2004	Fat Friends	Lorraine Frost	Episodes: "Food of Love" and "Eat Your Heart Out"
2004	In Denial of Murder	Jackie Dunn	
2004	The Lenny Henry Show		Episode: No. 1.1
2004	Blue Murder	Mary Hunt	Episode: Up in Smoke
2004	Conviction	Judy Fairley	3 episodes
2005	Holby City	Moira Roberts	Episode: "No Pain No Gain"
2006	Green Wing	Suzie	Episode: No. 2.5
2006–2007	Drop Dead Gorgeous	Kerry Willis	9 episodes
2007	Dead Clever	Gaynor	
2007	Lilies	Mrs. Brazendale	7 episodes
2007	Doctor Who	Valerie	Episode: "Gridlock"
2008	The Cup	Janice McConnell	6 episodes
2009	Coronation Street	Bernie Sayers	Recurring role
2010	Marchlands	Liz Runcie	
2010	Waterloo Road	Claire Evans	Episode: No. 6.3
2011	Hollyoaks	Registrar	
2011	South Riding	Mrs. Holly	2 episodes
2011	Psychoville	Rachel Groves	3 episodes
2011	Scott & Bailey	Mrs Farell	Episode: No. 1.2
2011	The Body Farm	Eleanor Garrick	Episode: No. 1.1
2012	Holby City	Pam Barker	Episode: "Butterflies"
2012	Starlings	WPC	Episode: No. 1.5
2012	Shameless	Louise	Episode: No. 10.5
2012	Monroe	Sally Indale	Episode: No. 2.4
2012–2013	Wizards vs Aliens	Helen Clarke	4 episodes
2013	Death Comes to Pemberley	Mrs Bidwell	3 episodes
2013	All at Sea	Cynthia Brice	Episode: "Biscuits"
2014	Utopia	Coach Station Mum	Episode: No. 2.6
2014	The Village	Charity Winkworth	Episode: No. 2.6
2014	The Passing Bells	Susan	5 episodes
2015	4 O'Clock Club	Mrs. Hazel	Episode: "Poem"
2015	Vera	Deirdre Reeves	Episode: "Muddy Waters"
2015	The Violators	Helen	TV film
2015	Rough and Ready	Dr. Winter	TV film
2015–2016	Dickensian	Emily Cratchit	15 episodes
2017	Doctor Who	Moira	Episodes: "The Pilot" and "Extremis"
2019	Father Brown	Sally Clegg	Episode: "The Blood of the Anarchists"
2020	Doctors	Lou Staunton	Episode: "Too Proud"
2020	Roadkill	Bryony Beckett	1 episode
2024	Sherwood	Chief Constable	6 episodes
2024	Doctors	Charlotte Heaversedge	2 episodes
