= St Winifred's School Choir =

English school choir active from 1968 to 2009

- Origin: Stockport, Greater Manchester, England
- Works: "There's No One Quite Like Grandma"
- Years active: 1968–2009
- Past members: Sally Lindsay; Jennifer Hennessy; Dawn Ralph; Dominic Blythe; Nicola Williams; Carolyn O'Driscoll; Tara Daynes; Julia McCann

St Winifred's School Choir was a children's vocal ensemble from St Winifred's Roman Catholic Primary School in Stockport, Greater Manchester. Formed in 1968, the choir achieved significant commercial success in the late 1970s and 1980s, most notably for their 1980 single "There's No One Quite Like Grandma". This track, written for the 80th birthday of Queen Elizabeth the Queen Mother, reached number one on the UK Singles Chart and sold over one million copies.

Under the direction of conductor Terri Foley, the choir previously appeared as uncredited backing vocalists for Brian and Michael's 1978 hit "Matchstalk Men and Matchstalk Cats and Dogs". Over the decades, the ensemble released multiple albums and participated in various charitable recordings, including a 2009 reunion to support Age Concern. Notable former members include actresses Sally Lindsay and Jennifer Hennessy.

== Career ==
=== Formation ===
The choir had formed in 1968 and been recording songs since 1972, when Miss Terri Foley played the guitar with the choir and the conductor was Miss Olive Moore. In 1978, they were the uncredited backing vocalists on the number one hit "Matchstalk Men and Matchstalk Cats and Dogs" by Brian and Michael (actually Kevin Parrott and Michael Coleman). The single concerned the paintings of L.S. Lowry and gave the choir their first appearance on the BBC One show Top of the Pops.

=== "There's No One Quite Like Grandma" ===
Their first major single under their own name came in November 1979. During this time, Foley trained and conducted the choir. In 1980, the choir signed to Music for Pleasure, an EMI associated label also known as MFP and released "There's No One Quite Like Grandma" in time for the Christmas market.

The song featured Dawn Ralph as the soloist and was written for the 80th birthday of Queen Elizabeth the Queen Mother in 1980 by record producer Gordon Lorenz and sold one million copies, most of them Christmas presents from grandchildren. It spent two weeks at number one, and 11 weeks on the UK Singles Chart in total. It was also the only UK No. 1 single for the MFP record label.

=== 1980s–2000s ===
Over the next ten years, they would release nine albums including in 1982, Christmas for Everyone; and in 1986 Children's Party Time, which included 32 arrangements of songs including ABBA's "Waterloo" and "Dancing Queen" and Boney M.'s "Hooray! Hooray! It's a Holi-Holiday" and "Brown Girl in the Ring". In 1987, they provided backing vocals for the Housemartins song "Bow Down" from "The People Who Grinned Themselves to Death" album.

In 1990, St Winifred's School Choir teamed up with Ziba Banafsheh and recorded "A Better World" in aid of Mother Teresa of Calcutta's charity, for BMG's Ariola label. In 1993, they recorded a cover of Barry Manilow's "One Voice" with Bill Tarmey (who played Jack Duckworth in Coronation Street), but ended up being uncredited on the release. This cover would be produced by Mike Stock and Pete Waterman from 1980s hitmaking production team Stock Aitken Waterman and would reach number 16 on the UK Singles Chart for Tarmey (and BMG's Arista label).

In November 2009, 14 of the original choir members reunited to record a new version of "There's No One Quite Like Grandma" in association with Innocent Drinks to raise money for the Age Concern charity.

== Notable members ==
One of the children who appeared on television in the 1980 recording of "There's No One Quite Like Grandma" was Sally Lindsay, who has gone on to become an actress, appearing in the ITV soap opera Coronation Street and the BBC sitcom The Royle Family. Another, Jennifer Hennessy, is also a television actress and has appeared in the BBC drama Doctor Who and the BBC comedy The Office.

== Discography ==
=== Studio albums ===
The choir released several albums, mostly through the Music For Pleasure (MFP) label:

- Sea Of Songs (1979) – A collaboration with the Bollington Festival Choir.
- And The Children Sing (1980) – Featuring a variety of children's and religious songs.
- My Very Own Party Record (1980) – A 24-track album covering nursery rhymes, traditional tunes, and pop covers of "Waterloo" by ABBA, "Rivers of Babylon" by Boney M., and "Bright Eyes" by Art Garfunkel.
- Hold My Hand (1981) – Includes covers of songs like "Moon Shadow" by Cat Stevens, "Bridge Over Troubled Water" by Simon & Garfunkel, and "I Have A Dream" by ABBA.
- Christmas For Everyone (1982) – A seasonal collection of carols and festive songs.
- It’s A Small, Small World (1983) – Subtitled Celebrate Disney's Diamond Jubilee, featuring classic Disney covers.

=== Notable singles ===
- "Bread And Fishes" (1979) – Early release prior to their chart-topping success.
- "There’s No One Quite Like Grandma" (1980) – Their most famous work, reaching Number 1 on the UK Singles Chart in December 1980.
- "I Can’t Think Of Anything More Beautiful" (1980) – Collaborated with Tony Troy.
- "Hold My Hand" (1981) – Released as a single following the album of the same name.
- "Welcome John Paul" (1982) – Commemorating the visit of Pope John Paul II.
- "A Better World" (1990) – Featuring Ziba Banafsheh, released as a charity single for refugees.

=== Compilations ===
- 20 All Time Children’s Favourites (1985) – A greatest hits style collection.
- Children's Party Time (1991) – A CD compilation that includes many tracks from their earlier party albums and Disney covers.

== See also ==
- Brian and Michael
- Claire and Friends - another group featuring St Winifred's School Choir members and a connection to Brian and Michael
