= Gordon Lorenz =

British musician

Gordon Albert Lorenz (4 March 1943 – 5 June 2011) was an English songwriter and record producer, who made his fame by writing the 1980 UK Christmas number one hit "There's No-one Quite Like Grandma" for St Winifred's School Choir. After the song's release, Lorenz became one of the most prolific record producers in the music industry, producing over 750 albums selling eight million records.

== Biography ==
Born in Childwall, an affluent suburb of Liverpool, his parents were both members of the Salvation Army. He was a pupil of Evered Avenue school in Walton Liverpool from 1956 to 1959 after passing the 13+ exam. To improve projection of his voice, his parents sent him to drama school, where he was first introduced to show business. After leaving drama school he became a travelling evangelist, travelling the United Kingdom in support of various Salvation Army endeavours.

After his father died, he approached his mother nervously and told her that he wanted to become a full-time musician. After struggling for a while, he was offered a job by Border Television to write fill-in music between their various day time shows, where he was introduced to the recording studio: "I always liked working in studios. They don't have any windows, they're always very quiet, deliberately conducive to concentration and work."

=== Writer/producer ===
In 1980, Lorenz wrote "There's No One Quite Like Grandma" to tie in with the Queen Mother's 80th birthday, and sent it to EMI. Having initially turned it down, the managing director rang him and said he decided to put it out because he said he could not get grandma, we love you out of his mind: "If it's caught in my mind chances are that it will with the public, and we'll put it out for Christmas". It was one of the last Christmas singles to sell one million copies, won an Ivor Novello Award for highest selling record of 1980 – beating Barbra Streisand's "Woman in Love" and The Police's "Don't Stand So Close to Me".

Subsequently employed full-time by EMI, Lorenz became one of the most prolific record producers in the music industry, producing over 800 albums (believed to be a world record), selling 8 million records, earning 17 platinum, gold and silver discs featuring some of the biggest international artists. After being asked by Unicef to help raise funds for children in Africa suffering from HIV and Aids, he produced The Best Gospel Album in the World... Ever, which featured the Royal Philharmonic Orchestra, Philharmonia Orchestra, Royal Choral Society and Howells Girls Choir. For EMI's MFP division, he also produced a five-LP series hosted by Derek Batey, Your 100 Favourite Hymns, that was highly successful in the 1980s. In 2008 the North Wales Daily Post claimed that the series was "still the biggest-selling religious recordings in history". In 2002, Lorenz wrote the song "Rejoice Rejoice" for the Queen's Golden Jubilee, sung by a 1,000 strong choir conducted by Sir David Willcocks outside Buckingham Palace as the Queen left in her coach for a Thanksgiving service at St Paul's Cathedral.

Lorenz also produced some albums for the children's TV series Sooty & Co, Thomas the Tank Engine & Friends and Budgie the Little Helicopter. He also wrote all the songs except for the theme song and the narration segments as well as providing the singing voice of Chuck.

Approached by music manager Jonathan Shalit, Lorenz was asked to produce two songs for a 12-year-old Charlotte Church, and introduce her to the recording studio. Lorenz recorded and produced her first two recordings, including the recording of "Pie Jesu".

Lorenz was a member of the British Academy of Composers and Authors, The Good Turns Society and The Music Publishers Association. He was also a vice-president of the Morriston Orpheus Choir and Llandudno Town Brass Band.

== Death ==
He died on 5 June 2011 at his home in Llandudno, Wales.

== Artists Lorenz produced for ==
- Larry Adler
- Shirley Bassey
- Max Boyce
- Charlotte Church
- Claudia Ciesla – Polish-born German model; her summer 2008 single "I Love Dancing in Espania" was written and produced by Lorenz, with its video shot at his home in Llandudno, Wales
- Petula Clark
- John Dankworth
- Ken Dodd
- Richard Fleeshman
- Gloria Gaynor
- George Hamilton IV
- Ruthie Henshall
- Paul Jones
- Howard Keel
- Atomic Kitten
- Joe Longthorne
- Lorna Luft
- Humphrey Lyttelton
- George Melly
- Anthony Newley
- Cliff Richard
- David Soul
- Claire Sweeney
- Bill Tarmey
- Marti Webb
- Roger Whittaker
- Toyah Willcox

=== Choirs ===
- Royal Philharmonic Orchestra
- BBC Concert Orchestra
- City of London Sinfonia
- Choir of St Paul's Cathedral
- Choir of York Minster
- Choir of Exeter
- Choir of Guildford
- Choir of St George's Chapel Windsor Castle
- Bridgend Male Choir

Treorchy Male Choir
