= Matchstalk Men and Matchstalk Cats and Dogs =

Single by Brian and Michael

from the album The Matchstalk Men
- B-side: "The Old Rocking Chair"
- Released: November 1977
- Genre: Folk rock
- Label: Pye
- Songwriters: Michael Coleman, Brian Burke
- Producer: Kevin Parrott

"Matchstalk Men and Matchstalk Cats and Dogs (Lowry's Song)" is a folk song by English duo Brian and Michael. It was released as their first single in late 1977 on Pye Records, and is from their 1978 debut album, The Matchstalk Men. The song reached number one on the UK Singles Chart for 3 weeks in April 1978. As the song is their only major hit, the duo remain as one-hit wonders in the UK, although one more single titled "Mama" briefly made the UK charts at No. 93 in 1983.

== Lyrics and performance ==
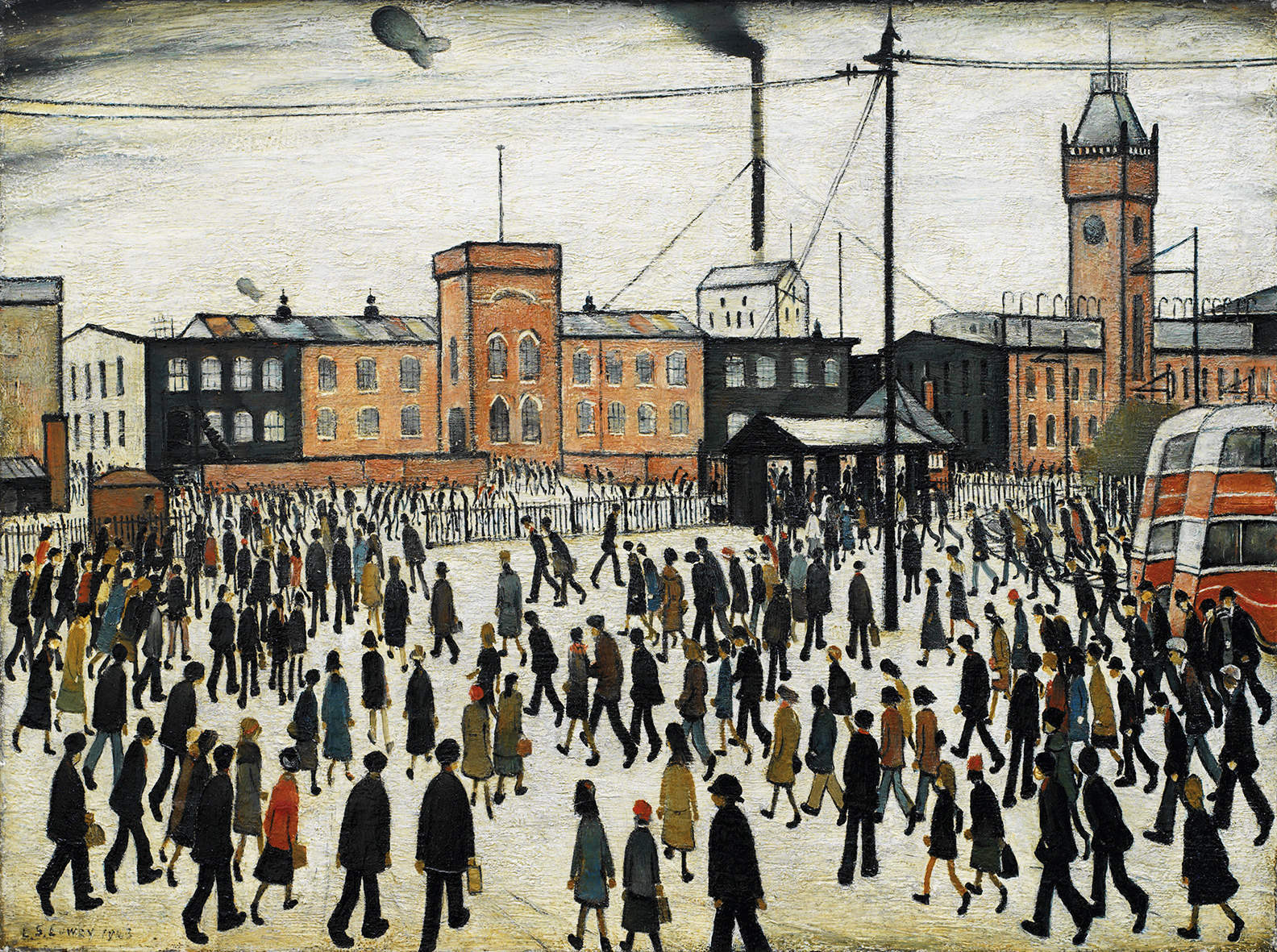
The song is a tribute to the artistic style of the Salford artist L. S. Lowry (Going to Work, 1943)

"Matchstalk Men and Matchstalk Cats and Dogs" was a tribute to the artist L. S. Lowry, who had died in February 1976. The chorus makes reference to Lowry's style of painting human figures, which was similar to stick figure drawings (a "matchstalk" is a matchstick in the Salford dialect).

For the song, Michael Coleman drew on his own memories of Salford and Ancoats as well as the paintings of Lowry. The song lyrics make reference to Lowry's painted scenes of bleak, industrial landscapes being initially unpopular, with the artist only finding fame in later life. According to the lyrics, now that Lowry's paintings hang in galleries among the world's great art, they are so revered that "even the Mona Lisa takes a bow". The song also makes reference to "sparking clogs". Clogs were a type of hard-wearing footwear popular in poor, industrial areas of northern England; to prevent the soles wearing out they were often fitted with iron "segs" or sometimes hob-nails, and these, when scraped along cobbled streets, would give off friction sparks.

St Winifred's School Choir appear on the record, singing as a descant the children's song "The Big Ship Sails on the Alley-Alley-O", which was sung by children in the Salford area with reference to the Manchester Ship Canal.

== Chart success and awards ==
The single spent three weeks at the top of the UK Singles Chart, with a total of 19 weeks on the chart. The B-side of the record is the track "The Old Rocking Chair". Coleman received the Ivor Novello award for 'The Outstanding Lyric of the Year'.

== See also ==
- List of UK Singles Chart number ones of the 1970s
- Pictures of Matchstick Men
