= There's No One Quite Like Grandma =

Single by St Winifred's School Choir
- B-side: "Pinocchio"
- Released: November 1980
- Genre: MOR
- Length: 2:58
- Label: Music for Pleasure
- Songwriter: Gordon Lorenz
- Producer: Peter Tattersall

"There's No One Quite Like Grandma" is a song by the Stockport-based primary school choir St Winifred's School Choir, released as a single in November 1980. It was number-one on the UK Singles Chart from 21 December 1980 to 3 January 1981. The song was written by Gordon Lorenz, recorded at 10cc's Strawberry Studios in Stockport and features Rick Wakeman on keyboards.

== Background ==
In 1980, Gordon Lorenz wrote "There's No One Quite Like Grandma" to tie in with Queen Elizabeth the Queen Mother's 80th birthday, and sent it to EMI. Having initially turned it down, the managing director rang him and said he decided to put it out because he said he could not get grandma, we love you out of his mind: "If it's caught in my mind chances are that it will with the public, and we'll put it out for Christmas".

== Recording ==
The song was recorded at 10cc's Strawberry Studios in 1980 at Strawberry Studios in Stockport and featured keyboards by Rick Wakeman from the Strawbs and Yes. The single was released in November 1980 on the Music for Pleasure label, an EMI associate.

== Release and reception ==
After its release in time for the Christmas market, "There's No One Quite Like Grandma" sold one million copies, most of them Christmas presents from grandchildren, and became the 1980 Christmas number-one single in both the UK and Ireland. Proceeds from the song funded school improvements like new carpets and library books. It received a polarized critical reception in 1980; while a massive commercial success and beloved by some for its nostalgic and sweet charm, many critics found it dreadful, cynical, and poorly produced; in 2014 it was listed as "one of the most hated yuletide songs of all time".

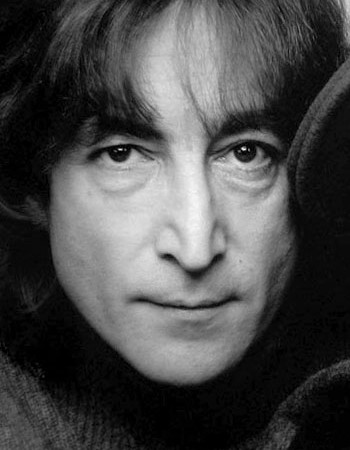
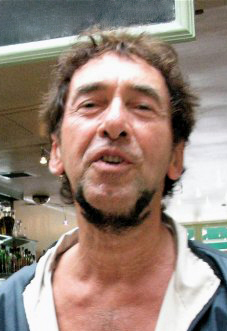
The song notably prevented John Lennon (left) and Jona Lewie (right) from reaching Christmas number one in 1980

In the UK, "There's No One Quite Like Grandma" notably prevented John Lennon's last single, "(Just Like) Starting Over", from becoming Christmas number one, which finished at number two on the Christmas chart. This significantly contributed to the polarising reception of "There's No One Quite Like Grandma" as Lennon had been murdered three weeks prior. After two weeks at number one, a previous Lennon song, "Imagine", replaced it. Ironically, Lennon had historically used the term "granny music" (or "granny shit") to dismiss Paul McCartney’s penchant for old-fashioned music-hall style Beatles songs like "Honey Pie" and "Maxwell's Silver Hammer," which he felt were overly sentimental and out of touch with rock and roll.

Another song that "There's No One Quite Like Grandma" prevented from becoming Christmas number one was "Stop the Cavalry" by Jona Lewie, which has since become a Christmas favourite in the UK that finished at number three on the Christmas chart. "There's No One Quite Like Grandma" was one of the last Christmas singles to sell one million copies, won an Ivor Novello Award for highest selling record of 1980 – beating Barbra Streisand's "Woman in Love" and The Police's "Don't Stand So Close to Me".

== In popular culture ==
The song was covered by Leilah and Jeordie (daughters of Melanie Safka) in 1981, and this version charted on the Canadian singles chart at No. 27 in January 1982.

In October 2009, the song was re-recorded by 14 members of the original choir. It was released in the UK in November 2009 as part of food company Innocent Drinks' "Big Knit" campaign, to raise money for Age Concern.

In 2008, the song was used within the one-off Channel 4 comedy by Peter Kay called Britain's Got the Pop Factor... and Possibly a New Celebrity Jesus Christ Soapstar Superstar Strictly on Ice, which had Sally Lindsay, who was in the original choir of the song and had since become friends with Kay, in a cameo role. Furthermore, an extract of the song was used in the "Granny Brainiac" segment in Series 3 of the Sky One TV show Brainiac: Science Abuse.

== See also ==
- "Grandad", UK number one by Clive Dunn in January 1971
