= List of performers on Top of the Pops =

This list of performers on Top of the Pops includes popular music recording artists and musical ensembles who have performed on Top of the Pops, a weekly BBC television programme that featured artists from the UK Singles Chart.

The BBC transmitted new instalments of the programme weekly from January 1964 through to July 2006, and from then on, only as Christmas and New Year Specials. It was also converted into a radio programme (not included here).

Although several artists appeared multiple times on the show over the years, the list notes just their first appearance. This list also only comprises artists who performed in the show's studio, not video clips shown.

== 1964 ==
- The Swinging Blue Jeans (first appeared 1 January)
- The Hollies (1 January)
- The Dave Clark Five (1 January)
- Gene Pitney (1 January)
- The Rolling Stones (1 January)
- Dusty Springfield (1 January)
- Adam Faith and the Roulettes (8 January)
- Billy Fury (8 January)
- Frank Ifield (15 January)
- Brenda Lee (15 January)
- The Merseybeats (22 January)
- The Searchers (22 January)
- Gerry and the Pacemakers (22 January)
- Brian Poole & the Tremeloes (22 January)
- The Bachelors (29 January)
- Manfred Mann (29 January)
- Cilla Black (5 February)
- Cliff Richard (5 February)
- Wayne Fontana and the Mindbenders (26 February)
- Herman's Hermits (26 February)
- Billy J. Kramer & the Dakotas (26 February)
- The Pretty Things (26 February)
- Eden Kane (26 February)
- The Swinging Blue Jeans (18 March)
- The Applejacks (25 March)
- Peter and Gordon (25 March)
- The Beatles (25 March)
- Millie (1 April)
- The Four Pennies (8 April)
- Migil 5 (15 April)
- Roy Orbison (6 May)
- Freddie and the Dreamers (13 May)
- Chuck Berry (20 May)
- Gigliola Cinquetti (20 May)
- Kathy Kirby (20 May)
- Sandie Shaw (20 May)
- Jackie Trent (20 May)
- Lulu (3 June)
- Louis Armstrong (10 June)
- Frankie Vaughan (17 June)
- John Lee Hooker (24 June)
- P.J. Proby (24 June)
- The Animals (1 July)
- Jim Reeves (1 July)
- The Barron Knights (15 July)
- The Nashville Teens (15 July)
- The Beach Boys (22 July)
- Dave Berry (12 August)
- The Honeycombs (12 August)
- The Kinks (19 August)
- The Zombies (26 August)
- Marianne Faithfull (2 September)
- Julie Rogers (9 September)
- The Supremes (16 September)
- Brenda Lee (23 September)
- Dean Martin (23 September)
- Matt Monro (1 October)
- Cliff Bennett and the Rebel Rousers (8 October)
- Henry Mancini (8 October)
- Lesley Gore (22 October)
- Tony Jackson and the Vibrations (22 October)
- Helmut Zacharias (12 November)
- Petula Clark (12 November)
- Val Doonican (12 November)
- Georgie Fame and the Blue Flames (10 December)
- Go-Jos (10 December)
- The Moody Blues (31 December)

== 1965 ==
- Sounds Orchestral (7 January)
- Them (7 January)
- Del Shannon (21 January)
- The Seekers (28 January)
- Tom Jones (11 February)
- The Ivy League (11 February)
- The Who (11 March)
- Jeff Beck (18 March)
- Donovan (25 March)
- Bob Dylan (22 April)
- Chubby Checker (29 April)
- The Rockin' Berries (13 May)
- The Walker Brothers (27 May)
- Unit 4+2 (3 June)
- The Yardbirds (24 June)
- Vikki Carr (15 July)
- Peter Cook & Dudley Moore (15 July)
- Sue Thompson (29 July)
- Horst Jankowski (12 August)
- The Fourmost (12 August)
- The Shadows (12 August)
- The Headliners (19 August)
- Sonny Bono (2 September)
- The Sorrows (2 September)
- Cher (9 September)
- The Small Faces (16 September)
- The Silkie (16 September)
- Peter, Paul and Mary (30 September)
- Billy Joe Royal (30 September)
- The Everly Brothers (7 October)
- Barry McGuire (14 October)
- Hedgehoppers Anonymous (14 October)
- Chris Andrews (14 October)
- Ken Dodd (14 October)
- Dick and Dee Dee (21 October)
- The Fortunes (28 October)
- Paul & Barry Ryan (28 October)
- Wilson Pickett (11 November)
- Sir Douglas Quintet (18 November)
- The Toys (2 December)
- Fontella Bass (2 December)
- The Spencer Davis Group (16 December)
- The Righteous Brothers (25 December)
- Peter Sellers (30 December)

== 1966 ==
- David and Jonathan (6 January)
- The Overlanders (6 January)
- Len Barry (13 January)
- Crispian St. Peters (20 January)
- Stevie Wonder (20 January)
- Pinkerton's Assorted Colours (27 January)
- Eddy Arnold (3 February)
- St. Louis Union (3 February)
- The Truth (17 February)
- Dave Dee, Dozy, Beaky, Mick & Tich (17 March)
- Bob Lind (17 March)
- The Alan Price Set (7 April)
- The Lovin' Spoonful (21 April)
- Nancy Sinatra (28 April)
- Trini Lopez (28 April)
- The Troggs (12 May)
- Neil Christian (12 May)
- Chris Farlowe (20 June)
- Los Bravos (7 July)
- Simon and Garfunkel (14 July)
- Twice as Much (21 July)
- New Vaudeville Band (22 September)
- Cat Stevens (6 October)
- Robert Parker (13 October)
- Lee Dorsey (20 October)
- Paul Jones (20 October)
- Paul Anka (3 November)
- Bobby Darin (10 November)
- Little Richard (24 November)
- Samantha Juste (24 November)
- The Easybeats (24 November)
- Bobby Hebb (1 December)
- Jimmy Ruffin (8 December)
- The Young Rascals (8 December)
- Rita Pavone (15 December)
- The Four Tops (27 December)
- The Jimi Hendrix Experience (29 December)
- Cream (29 December)

== 1967 ==
- The Move (12 January)
- The Spellbinders (26 January)
- Engelbert Humperdinck (9 February)
- Sandy Posey (16 February)
- Vince Hill (23 February)
- Keith (9 March)
- Harry Secombe (16 March)
- Otis Redding (23 March)
- Whistling Jack Smith (23 March)
- The Byrds (30 March)
- The Dubliners (13 April)
- Rolf Harris (13 April)
- P.P. Arnold (20 April)
- Warm Sounds (27 April)
- Neil Diamond (4 May)
- The Bee Gees (11 May)
- Procol Harum (25 May)
- The Young Idea (8 June)
- The Turtles (8 June)
- Judith Durham (15 June)
- Pink Floyd (6 July)
- Dave Davies (13 July)
- Anita Harris (27 July)
- John Walker (3 August)
- Amen Corner (3 August)
- The New Christy Minstrels (10 August)
- Keith West (24 August)
- The Flower Pot Men (7 September)
- Traffic (14 September)
- The Herd (28 September)
- The Foundations (19 October)
- Long John Baldry (2 November)
- Simon Dupree and the Big Sound (16 November)
- Felice Taylor (16 November)
- Des O'Connor (23 November)
- The Scaffold (7 December)

== 1968 ==
- Love Affair (4 January)
- Plastic Penny (18 January)
- John Fred and His Playboy Band (18 January)
- Solomon King (25 January)
- Brenton Wood (1 February)
- Status Quo (8 February)
- Grapefruit (8 February)
- Don Partridge (22 February)
- Esther & Abi Ofarim (22 February)
- John Rowles (29 February)
- Lemon Tree (7 March)
- Ranee & Raj (21 March)
- Tony Blackburn (21 March)
- The Paper Dolls (28 March)
- Dorian Gray (4 April)
- Reparata and the Delrons (4 April)
- Honeybus (11 April)
- Massiel (11 April)
- Spanky & Our Gang (18 April)
- The Showstoppers (18 April)
- Scott Walker (25 April)
- Jacky (25 April)
- Bobby Goldsboro (2 May)
- The Association (9 May)
- Aretha Franklin (16 May)
- Sacha Distel (16 May)
- Julie Driscoll, Brian Auger and the Trinity (23 May)
- Bobbie Gentry (23 May)
- Marmalade (30 May)
- The Equals (6 June)
- Cupid's Inspiration (27 June)
- O.C. Smith (4 July)
- Arthur Brown (18 July)
- Tim Rose (25 July)
- Sue Nicholls (25 July)
- Bruce Channel (1 August)
- Vanity Fare (22 August)
- The Casuals (29 August)
- The Flirtations (29 August)
- The Alan Bown Set (29 August)
- Canned Heat (5 September)
- Johnny Nash (5 September)
- The Doors (5 September)
- Mary Hopkin (12 September)
- Leapy Lee (19 September)
- The Marbles (3 October)
- Joe Cocker (17 October)
- Barry Ryan (17 October)
- Malcolm Roberts (7 November)
- Jeannie C. Riley (21 November)
- Gun (28 November)
- Sweet Inspirations (5 December)
- Bonzo Dog Doo-Dah Band (5 December)
- The Magic Lanterns (12 December)
- Love Sculpture (12 December)
- Nina Simone (12 December)

== 1969 ==
- Billie Davis (9 January)
- Cartoone (16 January)
- Donald Peers (23 January)
- Johnny Johnson and the Bandwagon (30 January)
- Harmony Grass (30 January)
- Peter Sarstedt (30 January)
- Dick Emery (20 February)
- The Tymes (6 March)
- Marv Johnson (13 March)
- Desmond Dekker (27 March)
- Noel Harrison (27 March)
- Clodagh Rodgers (10 April)
- Fleetwood Mac (10 April)
- Jefferson (24 April)
- Bob and Earl (1 May)
- Marsha Hunt (1 May)
- Joe South (15 May)
- Tony and Tandy (15 May)
- Chicken Shack (5 June)
- Jethro Tull (5 June)
- Family Dogg (12 June)
- Thunderclap Newman (19 June)
- Billy Preston (26 June)
- Robin Gibb (17 July)
- Joe Dolan (24 July)
- Humble Pie (7 August)
- Zager and Evans (14 August)
- Fairport Convention (14 August)
- The Peddlers (28 August)
- Hank Marvin (4 September)
- Fat Mattress (25 September)
- Karen Young (25 September)
- Sounds Nice (2 October)
- Lou Christie (2 October)
- David Bowie (9 October)
- Jimmy Cliff (30 October)
- Arthur Conley (6 November)
- Thelma Houston (27 November)
- Blue Mink (27 November)
- Tommy Roe (11 December)

== 1970 ==
- Badfinger (1 January)
- Arrival (1 January)
- Roger Whittaker (8 January)
- Edison Lighthouse (8 January)
- Daliah Lavi (8 January)
- The Temptations (15 January)
- Kenny Rogers and the First Edition (15 January)
- Joe Tex (22 January)
- Edwin Starr (22 January)
- Delaney & Bonnie (22 January)
- Nino Tempo and April Stevens (22 January)
- Blodwyn Pig (29 January)
- Rare Bird (29 January)
- Shocking Blue (29 January)
- Jonathan King (29 January)
- Brotherhood of Man (29 January)
- B.J. Thomas (5 February)
- Juicy Lucy (12 February)
- John, Yoko and The Plastic Ono Band (12 February)
- White Plains (12 February)
- Jackie Lomax (19 February)
- Sue and Sunny with Bobby Scott (19 February)
- Nanette (19 February)
- Pickettywitch (26 February)
- Dave Dee (26 February)
- Steve and Albert (26 February)
- The Cufflinks (26 February)
- The Faces (12 March)
- Bob and Marcia (19 March)
- The Doris Troy Group (19 March)
- Radha Krishna Temple (19 March)
- Julie Felix (19 March)
- Jerry Butler (26 March)
- King Crimson (26 March)
- Dana (2 April)
- Tom Springfield (2 April)
- Pipkins (2 April)
- Elton John (2 April)
- Slade (2 April)
- Jack Wild (9 April)
- Maurice Gibb (16 April)
- The Guess Who (16 April)
- Dionne Warwick (16 April)
- Peaches and Herb (23 April)
- Glen Campbell (23 April)
- Christie (7 May)
- Jake Holmes (7 May)
- Root & Jenny Jackson (7 May)
- Richard Barnes (7 May)
- Turley Richards (7 May)
- Butterscotch (14 May)
- Teresa Graves (14 May)
- Savoy Brown (21 May)
- Tony Joe White (21 May)
- Opus (21 May)
- Fairfield Parlour (28 May)
- Mr. Bloe (28 May)
- Brinsley Schwarz (28 May)
- Zoot Money (28 May)
- Gerry Monroe (4 June)
- Mungo Jerry (4 June)
- Free (4 June)
- Mason Williams (18 June)
- Fair Weather (9 July)
- Hotlegs (16 July)
- Shirley Bassey (16 July)
- Soft Pedalling (16 July)
- Country Joe McDonald (16 July)
- Audience (23 July)
- Jonathan Kelly (23 July)
- Madeline Bell (23 July)
- Stavely Makepeace (30 July)
- The New Seekers (30 July)
- The Wake (30 July)
- Jerry Reed (6 August)
- Richard Harris (6 August)
- The Rattles (13 August)
- Matthew's Southern Comfort (13 August)
- Hot Chocolate (20 August)
- Ray Stevens (20 August)
- Caravan (20 August)
- Martha Reeves and the Vandellas (20 August)
- Family (27 August)
- Gary Osborne and the Heavies (27 August)
- The Voices of East Harlem (3 September)
- Eli Bonaparte (3 September)
- Deep Purple (10 September)
- Bobby Bloom (10 September)
- Rod McKuen (10 September)
- Doris Troy (17 September)
- Labi Siffre (17 September)
- Peter E. Bennett (17 September)
- Horace Faith (17 September)
- Black Sabbath (24 September)
- Oliver (24 September)
- The Delltones (24 September)
- Birds of a Feather (1 October)
- Quartet (1 October)
- Baskin & Copperfield (15 October)
- Humpy Bong (22 October)
- Clarence Carter (22 October)
- Don Fardon (29 October)
- James Taylor (29 October)
- Edwin Hawkins Singers (5 November)
- The Tears (5 November)
- McGuinness Flint (12 November)
- T. Rex (12 November)
- Dave Edmunds (12 November)
- Deep Feeling (26 November)
- CCS (26 November)
- Gilbert O'Sullivan (26 November)
- The Men (26 November)
- Stone the Crows (10 December)
- Lance LeGault (10 December)
- Clive Dunn (10 December)
- England World Cup Squad (25 December)
- Livingston Taylor (31 December)

== 1971 ==
- Mike d'Abo (7 January)
- John Paul Joans (14 January)
- Ashton, Gardner and Dyke (21 January)
- Rufus Thomas (21 January)
- Frankie Valli (28 January)
- The Mixtures (28 January)
- Tony Christie (4 February)
- Marvin, Welch & Farrar (4 February)
- Atomic Rooster (25 February)
- The Four Seasons (25 February)
- New World (4 March)
- Frankie Howerd (4 March)
- Lynn Anderson (11 March)
- Matchbox (18 March)
- Tom Paxton (18 March)
- Assagai (25 March)
- Cleo Laine (25 March)
- Olivia Newton-John (25 March)
- The Sweet (1 April)
- Fame & Price (1 April)
- Yes (1 April)
- Pentangle (8 April)
- Seals & Crofts (8 April)
- Yvonne Elliman, Murray Head & The Trinidad Singers (8 April)
- The Fantastics (15 April)
- Bruce Ruffin (15 April)
- Guy Fletcher (15 April)
- The Groundhogs (15 April)
- Perry Como (6 May)
- Freda Payne (6 May)
- Severine (6 May)
- Sakkarin (6 May)
- Arsenal Football Club (13 May)
- East of Eden (20 May)
- The Grease Band (20 May)
- Peter Noone (27 May)
- Medicine Head (27 May)
- John Kongos (27 May)
- Osibisa (27 May)
- Gordon Lightfoot (3 June)
- Brewer & Shipley with Southern Comfort (3 June)
- Chairmen of the Board (10 June)
- Peter Green (17 June)
- Tami Lynn (17 June)
- Mick Abrahams (17 June)
- Tin Tin (24 June)
- Middle of the Road (24 June)
- Greyhound (1 July)
- The Delfonics (1 July)
- The Strawbs (1 July)
- David Gates (8 July)
- Curtis Mayfield (8 July)
- Froggatt (8 July)
- Curved Air (15 July)
- John Williams (22 July)
- Mott the Hoople (22 July)
- Buffy Sainte-Marie (29 July)
- Chicory Tip (5 August)
- The James Gang (5 August)
- Paul Brett's Sage (12 August)
- The Pioneers (12 August)
- Rod Stewart (19 August)
- Gypsy (26 August)
- Tony Orlando and Dawn (2 September)
- Daniel Boone (2 September)
- Autumn (16 September)
- The Elgins (23 September)
- The Carpenters (23 September)
- Seatrain (30 September)
- Bay City Rollers (30 September)
- Titanic (7 October)
- Danyel Gérard (7 October)
- The Tams (7 October)
- Richie Havens (14 October)
- Scott English (21 October)
- Lesley Duncan (28 October)
- Jason & Gerome (18 November)
- Mary Travers (25 November)
- The Congregation (9 December)
- Johnny Pearson Orchestra (16 December)
- Dave & Ansil Collins (25 December)
- B. J. Arnau (30 December)
- Neil Reid (30 December)

== 1972 ==
- America (6 January)
- The Coasters (6 January)
- Pagliaro (27 January)
- Colin Blunstone (17 February)
- Chelsea Football Club (24 February)
- Lindisfarne (2 March)
- The Fifth Dimension (2 March)
- Argent (9 March)
- Uriah Heep (16 March)
- Anne Murray (30 March)
- Vicky Leandros (13 April)
- Chris Montez (13 April)
- The Angelettes (27 April)
- Hurricane Smith (27 April)
- Wings (25 May)
- Don McLean (1 June)
- Gary Glitter (22 June)
- Terry Dactyl and the Dinosaurs (13 July)
- Alice Cooper (13 July)
- Electric Light Orchestra (27 July)
- Mary Wells (27 July)
- Blackfoot Sue (10 August)
- Lynsey de Paul (17 August)
- Duncan Browne (17 August)
- The Pearls (24 August)
- Roxy Music (24 August)
- Dandy Livingstone (14 September)
- The Drifters (21 September)
- Lieutenant Pigeon (21 September)
- Peter Skellern (21 September)
- 10cc (28 September)
- Junior Campbell (28 September)
- Three Dog Night (5 October)
- Harley Quinne (5 October)
- Espirit De Corps (19 October)
- The Stylistics (26 October)
- The Osmonds (2 November)
- The Jackson 5 (9 November)
- Geordie (9 November)
- Gladys Knight and the Pips (16 November)
- Michael Jackson (23 November)
- Neil Sedaka (23 November)
- Bill Withers (30 November)
- Wizzard (14 December)
- Roberta Flack (28 December)

== 1973 ==
- Thin Lizzy (1 February)
- Bruce Forsyth (8 February)
- The Real Thing (15 February)
- Miki Antony (22 February)
- The Cockerel Chorus (1 March)
- Kenny (8 March)
- Jimmy Helms (8 March)
- Timmy Thomas (15 March)
- Mud (29 March)
- Roger Daltrey (29 March)
- Stuart Gillies (5 April)
- Anne-Marie David (27 April)
- Nazareth (11 May)
- Suzi Quatro (11 May)
- Stealers Wheel (18 May)
- The Hotshots (8 June)
- Peters and Lee (8 June)
- Linda Lewis (15 June)
- Clifford T. Ward (13 July)
- Joe Simon (13 July)
- First Choice (27 July)
- Roy Wood (3 August)
- Barry Blue (3 August)
- Hudson Ford (17 August)
- Donny Osmond (17 August)
- Chaos (24 August)
- Limmie and the Family Cookin' (24 August)
- David Essex (31 August)
- Bobbie McGee (31 August)
- Manfred Mann's Earth Band (13 September)
- Guy Darrell (20 September)
- Simon Park Orchestra (20 September)
- Bryan Ferry (4 October)
- David Cassidy (4 October)
- Michael Ward (11 October)
- Alvin Stardust (15 November)
- Kiki Dee (15 November)
- Leo Sayer (29 November)
- Golden Earring (6 December)
- Millican & Nesbitt (13 December)
- Steeleye Span (13 December)
- Billy Paul (13 December)
- Drupi (13 December)

== 1974 ==
- Cozy Powell (3 January)
- Andy Williams (3 January)
- Ronnie Lane & Slim Chance (10 January)
- Brotherly Love (17 January)
- Robert Knight (31 January)
- The Wombles (31 January)
- Bubblerock (31 January)
- Prelude (7 February)
- Paper Lace (14 February)
- Lena Zavaroni (14 February)
- Queen (21 February)
- The Isley Brothers (21 February)
- Bill Haley and his Comets (28 February)
- John Christie (28 February)
- Candlewick Green (7 March)
- Compass (7 March)
- Freddie Starr (7 March)
- Harold Melvin and the Bluenotes (28 March)
- The Glitter Band (4 April)
- Little Jimmy Osmond (4 April)
- Sunny (4 April)
- ABBA (11 April)
- The Rubettes (25 April)
- Sparks (9 May)
- Gigliola Cinquetti (9 May)
- Arrows (16 May)
- Mouth & MacNeal (16 May)
- Showaddywaddy (23 May)
- Cockney Rebel (23 May)
- Bad Company (6 June)
- The First Class (13 June)
- Paul Da Vinci (8 August)
- Jim Stafford (8 August)
- Sweet Dreams (8 August)
- Donny & Marie Osmond (15 August)
- Sylvia (15 August)
- The Three Degrees (15 August)
- Bobby Goldsboro (22 August)
- Carl Douglas (29 August)
- Sweet Sensation (13 September)
- Mick Robertson (13 September)
- Mike McGear (13 September)
- Brian Protheroe (20 September)
- Andy Fairweather-Low (20 September)
- Peter Shelley (20 September)
- Robert Wyatt (20 September)
- Johnny Bristol (27 September)
- Polly Brown (27 September)
- Pilot (4 October)
- The Cats (17 October)
- Gary Shearston (24 October)
- Splinter (24 October)
- Ken Boothe (24 October)
- Hello (31 October)
- K.C. and the Sunshine Band (31 October)
- The Javells (7 November)
- The Crystals (14 November)
- Ace (14 November)
- Ronnie Corbett (14 November)
- The Peppers (21 November)
- The Goodies (28 November)
- Wayne Gibson (28 November)
- Rupie Edwards (5 December)
- The Tymes (5 December)
- Ralph McTell (12 December)
- Charles Aznavour (25 December)
- George McCrae (27 December)
- Stephanie de Sykes (27 December)

== 1975 ==
- Philip and Vanessa (2 January)
- Gloria Gaynor (2 January)
- Mac and Katie Kissoon (16 January)
- Johnny Wakelin (16 January)
- Steve Harley and Cockney Rebel (30 January)
- Supertramp (6 February)
- Syreeta (6 February)
- Fox (13 February)
- Billy Swan (13 February)
- Betty Wright (13 February)
- Hamilton Bohannon (20 February)
- Johnny Mathis (20 February)
- Shirley & Company (20 February)
- Guys 'n' Dolls (20 February)
- Duane Eddy (27 February)
- Tam White (13 March)
- The Moments & The Whatnauts (20 March)
- Mike Read (20 March)
- Teach-In (27 March)
- Gilbert Becaud (3 April)
- Susan Cadogan (10 April)
- Beano (17 April)
- Lelly Boone (17 April)
- April (17 April)
- Silver Convention (1 May)
- Windsor Davies & Don Estelle (1 May)
- Tammy Jones (1 May)
- Chips (8 May)
- Judy Collins (22 May)
- Jackie Wilson (22 May)
- Catherine Howe (22 May)
- Retta Young (19 June)
- Pete Wingfield (26 June)
- Sister Sledge (26 June)
- Tammy Wynette (3 July)
- Lyn Paul (10 July)
- Smokie (10 July)
- The Sensational Alex Harvey Band (17 July)
- Adrian Baker (17 July)
- Typically Tropical (24 July)
- Bing Crosby (24 July)
- Brian Hyland (31 July)
- Biddu Orchestra (31 July)
- Gary Benson (7 August)
- Mike Harding (7 August)
- Linda Carr (14 August)
- Mike Batt (21 August)
- Jasper Carrott (28 August)
- Bimbo Jet (28 August)
- Chris Spedding (28 August)
- 5000 Volts (4 September)
- Dan McCafferty (4 September)
- Al Matthews (4 September)
- Disco Tex and the Sex-O-Lettes (11 September)
- Band of the Black Watch (25 September)
- George Baker Selection (25 September)
- Carl Malcolm (2 October)
- The Chi-Lites (2 October)
- Art Garfunkel (2 October)
- Morris Albert (9 October)
- John Miles (9 October)
- Tommy Hunt (16 October)
- Justin Hayward & John Lodge (16 October)
- Billie Jo Spears (23 October)
- Natalie Cole (23 October)
- Maxine Nightingale (30 October)
- Jigsaw (6 November)
- Jim Capaldi (6 November)
- 14 - 18 (6 November)
- Billy Connolly (6 November)
- Demis Roussos (13 November)
- Stretch (13 November)
- John Asher (20 November)
- Stephenson's Rocket (4 December)
- Sailor (4 December)
- Greg Lake (11 December)
- Chris Hill (11 December)
- The Fatback Band (18 December)
- Telly Savalas (25 December)

== 1976 ==
- Bo Flyers (1 January)
- Slik (1 January)
- Glyder (1 January)
- R&J Stone (8 January)
- Sheer Elegance (8 January)
- Barbara Dickson (8 January)
- Billy Howard (15 January)
- Mike Oldfield (15 January)
- Tina Charles (5 February)
- Be Bop Deluxe (5 February)
- Billy Ocean (12 February)
- The Surprise Sisters (12 February)
- L.J. Johnson (19 February)
- St. Andrew's Chorale (19 February)
- Evelyn Thomas (19 February)
- The Chequers (4 March)
- Gallagher & Lyle (4 March)
- Rainbow Cottage (11 March)
- Randy Edelman (18 March)
- The Miracles (25 March)
- Tarney & Spencer (1 April)
- Laurie Andrew (1 April)
- Paul Nicholas (8 April)
- Eric Carmen (15 April)
- Jimmy James & The Vagabonds (22 April)
- Harpo (22 April)
- Keith Emerson (22 April)
- Laurie Lingo & The Dipsticks (29 April)
- Barry Manilow (6 May)
- Robin Sarstedt (6 May)
- Sutherland Brothers & Quiver (6 May)
- J.J. Barrie (6 May)
- City Boy (13 May)
- Lee Garrett (13 May)
- The Wurzels (13 May)
- Heavy Metal Kids (27 May)
- The G. Band (3 June)
- The New Edition (3 June)
- Our Kid (3 June)
- Flintlock (10 June)
- Liverpool Express (17 June)
- Sunfighter (15 July)
- One Hundred Ton & a Feather (15 July)
- Glamour Puss (15 July)
- David Dundas (22 July)
- 1776 (22 July)
- The Chanter Sisters (29 July)
- Twiggy (5 August)
- Jesse Green (19 August)
- Can (26 August)
- Acker Bilk (26 August)
- Pussycat (2 September)
- Barry Biggs (2 September)
- Eddie and the Hot Rods (9 September)
- J.A.L.N. Band (16 September)
- Sherbet (30 September)
- Simon May (14 October)
- Climax Blues Band (21 October)
- Joan Armatrading (28 October)
- Bonnie Tyler (4 November)
- The Kursaal Flyers (25 November)

== 1977 ==
- Boney M (6 January)
- David Parton (13 January)
- The Brothers (27 January)
- Mr. Big (27 January)
- The Detroit Spinners (10 February)
- Racing Cars (10 February)
- Les Gray (17 February)
- Graham Parker & The Rumour (10 March)
- Lynsey de Paul & Mike Moran (10 March)
- Brendon (10 March)
- Berni Flint (17 March)
- Barclay James Harvest (17 March)
- Elkie Brooks (24 March)
- Dead End Kids (24 March)
- Blue (31 March)
- The Manhattans (7 April)
- David Soul (14 April)
- Delegation (21 April)
- Deniece Williams (21 April)
- Contempt (28 April)
- Rags (28 April)
- Joy Sarney (5 May)
- Honky (12 May)
- Trinidad Oil Company (12 May)
- Martyn Ford Orchestra (12 May)
- Dr. Feelgood (12 May)
- Carole Bayer Sager (19 May)
- Tony Etoria (19 May)
- The Jam (19 May)
- Frankie Miller (26 May)
- The Stranglers (26 May)
- Marie Myriam (26 May)
- Neil Innes (9 June)
- Bob Marley & The Wailers (9 June)
- Andy Gibb (16 June)
- Gene Cotton (16 June)
- Archie Bell & the Drells (16 June)
- The Foster Brothers (16 June)
- Tom Petty and the Heartbreakers (16 June)
- John Miles (30 June)
- Hot Chocolate (30 June)
- Cliff Richard (30 June)
- Queen (30 June)
- Jesse Green (30 June)
- The RAH Band (7 July)
- The Saints (14 July)
- Alessi Brothers (21 July)
- Danny Williams (21 July)
- John Miles (21 July)
- Steve Gibbons Band (28 July)
- The Dooleys (4 August)
- The Boomtown Rats (25 August)
- The Adverts (25 August)
- Page Three (25 August)
- Elvis Costello (1 September)
- The Motors (8 September)
- Black Gorilla (8 September)
- Rosetta Stone (8 September)
- Danny Mirror (15 September)
- Generation X (15 September)
- Hank the Knife and the Jets (22 September)
- Baccara (22 September)
- Stardust (22 September)
- Rose Royce (29 September)
- Peter Blake (29 September)
- Rokotto (13 October)
- Mary Mason (13 October)
- John Forde (13 October)
- Dorothy Moore (20 October)
- Darts (27 October)
- Tom Robinson Band (27 October)
- Smokey Robinson (27 October)
- Brighouse & Rastrick Brass Band (17 November)
- Noosha Fox (17 November)
- The Carvells (24 November)
- Santa Esmeralda & Leroy Gomez (24 November)
- John Otway & Wild Willy Barrett (1 December)
- The Banned (8 December)
- The Emotions (15 December)
- Scott Fitzgerald & Yvonne Keeley (22 December)
- Godley and Creme (22 December)
- Gordon Giltrap (22 December)
- Heatwave (26 December)

== 1978 ==
- Long Tall Ernie & The Shakers (5 January)
- The Babys (5 January)
- Terry Wogan (5 January)
- Tonight (5 January)
- Odyssey (19 January)
- Radio Stars (19 January)
- Rich Kids (26 January)
- Althia & Donna (29 January)
- Yellow Dog (29 January)
- David Castle (9 February)
- Kate Bush (16 February)
- Magazine (16 February)
- Blondie (23 February)
- The Manhattan Transfer (23 February)
- Brian & Michael (23 February)
- Nick Lowe (2 March)
- Andy Cameron (9 March)
- Dan Hill (16 March)
- The Vibrators (16 March)
- Dr. Hook (23 March)
- Richard Myhill (30 March)
- Don Williams (30 March)
- Squeeze (6 April)
- Co-Co (6 April)
- Child (13 April)
- Dee D. Jackson (13 April)
- Raffaella Carra (13 April)
- Foreigner (27 April)
- Jonathan Richman & The Modern Lovers (27 April)
- The Buzzcocks (27 April)
- Hi-Tension (4 May)
- John Paul Young (4 May)
- Ian Dury & The Blockheads (11 May)
- Sham 69 (11 May)
- Goldie (11 May)
- Plastic Bertrand (18 May)
- Guy Marks (18 May)
- X-Ray Spex (18 May)
- James Galway (25 May)
- AC/DC (8 June)
- Whitesnake (22 June)
- San José featuring Rodriguez Argentina (22 June)
- Patti Boulaye (29 June)
- Jim Rafferty (29 June)
- Steel Pulse (6 July)
- Steve Voice (13 July)
- Renaissance (13 July)
- Racey (13 July)
- Raydio (20 July)
- Kandidate (27 July)
- The Lurkers (3 August)
- The Rezillos (10 August)
- Jilted John (10 August)
- Bilbo (24 August)
- Klark Kent (31 August)
- Exile (31 August)
- Arthur Mullard & Hylda Baker (7 September)
- Motörhead (14 September)
- Stephen Bishop (21 September)
- The Ramones (28 September)
- Sugar Cane (28 September)
- Chris Rea (28 September)
- Mick Jackson (5 October)
- Elaine Paige (5 October)
- Marshall Hain (5 October)
- Olympic Runners (12 October)
- The Count Bishops (12 October)
- Colorado (19 October)
- Dollar (26 October)
- The Undertones (26 October)
- The Skids (2 November)
- Nick Gilder (2 November)
- Streetband (2 November)
- Dandy (9 November)
- Liquid Gold (9 November)
- Chas and Dave (9 November)
- Dean Friedman (16 November)
- Emerson, Lake & Palmer (23 November)
- Mankind (30 November)
- Rachel Sweet (7 December)
- Gerard Kenny (7 December)
- Sally Oldfield (7 December)
- Sarah Brightman & Hot Gossip (7 December)
- Rocky Sharpe and the Replays (14 December)

== 1979 ==
- Driver 67 (11 January)
- The Doll (11 January)
- Steve Allan (11 January)
- Chic (18 January)
- Judas Priest (18 January)
- Phoebe Snow (18 January)
- The Members (1 February)
- UFO (1 February)
- Two Man Sound (1 February)
- The Pointer Sisters (1 February)
- The Pretenders (15 February)
- Lene Lovich (15 February)
- Violinski (1 March)
- Inner Circle (9 March)
- Dennis Brown (9 March)
- The Late Show (9 March)
- The Leyton Buzzards (9 March)
- Black Lace (15 March)
- Gonzalez (29 March)
- M (5 April)
- Milk and Honey (5 April)
- Light of the World (12 April)
- Eruption (26 April)
- The Monks (26 April)
- The Dickies (3 May)
- The Police (3 May)
- The Damned (10 May)
- The Tubes (17 May)
- XTC (17 May)
- Max Webster (17 May)
- Tubeway Army (24 May)
- Liner (24 May)
- Quantum Jump (31 May)
- Voyager (31 May)
- Fischer-Z (31 May)
- The Tourists (7 June)
- Eddy Grant (7 June)
- Match (14 June)
- McFadden & Whitehead (14 June)
- Janet Kay (14 June)
- Anita Ward (14 June)
- Ruby Winters (21 June)
- The Ruts (21 June)
- Dame Edna Everage (21 June)
- Patrick Hernandez (21 June)
- Sniff 'n' the Tears (21 June)
- Thom Pace (28 June)
- UK Subs (28 June)
- The Korgis (5 July)
- The Knack (5 July)
- Siouxsie and the Banshees (12 July)
- Stonebridge McGuinness (12 July)
- Public Image Ltd. (12 July)
- Chantal Curtis (12 July)
- Judie Tzuke (12 July)
- Telex (26 July)
- Spyro Gyra (26 July)
- B.A. Robertson (2 August)
- The Specials (2 August)
- The Gibson Brothers (2 August)
- The Flying Lizards (9 August)
- Me and You (9 August)
- The Merton Parkas (9 August)
- Joe Jackson (9 August)
- Angelic Upstarts (9 August)
- Bill Lovelady (23 August)
- The Planets (23 August)
- Secret Affair (30 August)
- Gary Numan (30 August)
- The Commodores (30 August)
- Madness (6 September)
- The Crusaders (6 September)
- The Starjets (20 September)
- The Jags (20 September)
- Sad Café (20 September)
- Frantique (27 September)
- Errol Dunkley (27 September)
- John Du Cann (27 September)
- The Nolans (27 September)
- Matumbi (4 October)
- Lena Martell (4 October)
- XTC (10 October)
- The Headboys (11 October)
- Viola Wills (11 October)
- Cats UK (11 October)
- New Musik (18 October)
- The Ramblers (18 October)
- The Selecter (18 October)
- Iris Williams (25 October)
- Janet Brown (25 October)
- Matchbox (8 November)
- Dan-I (8 November)
- Storm (6 December)
- Bad Manners (6 December)
- Fiddler's Dram (13 December)
- The Beat (13 December)
- The Inmates (13 December)
- The Greedies (20 December)
- The Regents (20 December)
- The Buggles (25 December)

== 1980 ==
- Kurtis Blow (3 January)
- Positive Force (17 January)
- Dexy's Midnight Runners (17 January)
- Amii Stewart (17 January)
- Rupert Holmes (17 January)
- John Foxx (31 January)
- Keith Michell (31 January)
- The Chords (7 February)
- Marti Webb (14 February)
- Stiff Little Fingers (14 February)
- Shakin' Stevens (22 February)
- Fern Kinney (22 February)
- Iron Maiden (22 February)
- The Vapors (28 February)
- The Lambrettas (6 March)
- Martha and the Muffins (6 March)
- Tony Rallo & The Midnite Band (6 March)
- Genesis (13 March)
- The Bodysnatchers (20 March)
- UB40 (20 March)
- Prima Donna (3 April)
- Saxon (10 April)
- Sky (10 April)
- Phil Lynott (17 April)
- Girl (17 April)
- The Cure (24 April)
- Cockney Rejects (24 April)
- Bad Manners (24 April)
- Johnny Logan (24 April)
- The Chords (1 May)
- The Human League (8 May)
- Jona Lewie (8 May)
- Orchestral Manoeuvres in the Dark (8 May)
- The Four Bucketeers (15 May)
- Peter Gabriel (15 May)
- Karel Fialka (22 May)
- Junior Murvin (22 May)
- Average White Band (22 May)
- The Piranhas (7 August)
- Kelly Marie (7 August)
- Sheena Easton (7 August)
- Ultravox (14 August)
- Mike Berry (14 August)
- Grace Jones (14 August)
- Sue Wilkinson (14 August)
- Nick Straker Band (21 August)
- Hazel O'Connor (21 August)
- The Barracudas (28 August)
- Randy Crawford (4 September)
- Splodgenessabounds (11 September)
- Split Enz (11 September)
- Black Slate (25 September)
- Linx (25 September)
- Gillan (2 October)
- Adam and the Ants (16 October)
- Kool and the Gang (6 November)
- Dennis Waterman (6 November)
- Spandau Ballet (13 November)
- Robert Palmer (27 November)
- The Stray Cats (27 November)
- St. Winifred's School Choir (4 December)

== 1981 ==
- The Look (8 January)
- Susan Fassbender (15 January)
- Dire Straits (15 January)
- Phil Collins (15 January)
- Yarbrough and Peoples (22 January)
- Honey Bane (22 January)
- Sheila Hylton (29 January)
- Fred Wedlock (5 February)
- The Passions (5 February)
- Barbara Jones (12 February)
- Coast to Coast (12 February)
- Freeez (12 February)
- Beggar and Co (12 February)
- The Teardrop Explodes (19 February)
- Motörhead & Girlschool (19 February)
- Toyah (19 February)
- Joe Dolce (19 February)
- Kim Wilde (26 February)
- Duran Duran (5 March)
- Talking Heads (12 March)
- Sharon Redd (19 March)
- Dave Stewart & Colin Blunstone (19 March)
- Bucks Fizz (19 March)
- The Polecats (26 March)
- Graham Bonnet (26 March)
- Tony Capstick (26 March)
- The Children of Tansley School (2 April)
- Sugar Minott (2 April)
- Keith Marshall (9 April)
- Department S (16 April)
- Level 42 (23 April)
- Roger Taylor (23 April)
- Tenpole Tudor (30 April)
- Tottenham Hotspur Football Club (7 May)
- Kate Robbins (4 June)
- Imagination (4 June)
- Enigma (11 June)
- Kirsty MacColl (25 June)
- The Evasions (25 June)
- Depeche Mode (25 June)
- Tight Fit (23 July)
- Gidea Park (23 July)
- Bill Wyman (30 July)
- Soft Cell (13 August)
- Aneka (13 August)
- U2 (20 August)
- Lobo (20 August)
- Startrax (27 August)
- Modern Romance (3 September)
- Funkapolitan (3 September)
- The Tweets (17 September)
- Dave Stewart & Barbara Gaskin (24 September)
- Japan (24 September)
- Heaven 17 (24 September)
- The Creatures (1 October)
- Altered Images (1 October)
- B.A. Robertson & Maggie Bell (15 October)
- The Exploited (15 October)
- This Year's Blonde (22 October)
- The Fureys (29 October)
- Trevor Walters (29 October)
- Haircut 100 (29 October)
- The Dukes (5 November)
- ABC (5 November)
- Fun Boy Three (19 November)
- The Snowmen (17 December)

== 1982 ==
- Alton Edwards (7 January)
- Mobiles (7 January)
- Shakatak (7 January)
- Jon & Vangelis (7 January)
- Theatre of Hate (4 February)
- Bananarama (11 February)
- Bow Wow Wow (11 February)
- Adrian Gurvitz (11 February)
- Toni Basil (18 February)
- The Associates (25 February)
- Goombay Dance Band (4 March)
- Pluto (11 March)
- Classix Nouveaux (18 March)
- Foster and Allen (25 March)
- Killing Joke (25 March)
- Bardo (1 April)
- Simple Minds (15 April)
- Pigbag (22 April)
- PhD (22 April)
- Yazoo (29 April)
- Nicole (29 April)
- Monsoon (29 April)
- Junior (6 May)
- Patrice Rushen (6 May)
- Scottish World Cup Squad (6 May)
- Joan Jett & The Blackhearts (13 May)
- Adam Ant (20 May)
- Echo and the Bunnymen (3 June)
- Charlene (3 June)
- Kid Creole & The Coconuts (10 June)
- Natasha (17 June)
- Captain Sensible (24 June)
- Shalamar (24 June)
- Visage (1 July)
- Trio (8 July)
- The Belle Stars (22 July)
- The Brat (22 July)
- The Firm (29 July)
- Toto Coelo (12 August)
- Boystown Gang (12 August)
- Haysi Fantayzee (12 August)
- Wavelength (12 August)
- Thomas Dolby (19 August)
- David Christie (26 August)
- Evelyn King (9 September)
- Mari Wilson (16 September)
- Talk Talk (16 September)
- Culture Club (23 September)
- The Pinkees (30 September)
- Bauhaus (7 October)
- Tears for Fears (14 October)
- Melba Moore (14 October)
- Raw Silk (28 October)
- Blue Zoo (28 October)
- Wham! (4 November)
- Blancmange (4 November)
- Daryl Hall & John Oates (4 November)
- A Flock of Seagulls (11 November)
- Clannad (11 November)
- Lionel Richie (25 November)
- Santa Claus & The Christmas Trees (16 December)
- The Maisonettes (23 December)
- Incantation (23 December)
- Keith Harris & Orville (23 December)
- Musical Youth (25 December)

== 1983 ==
- Wah! (6 January)
- Kajagoogoo (20 January)
- Central Line (27 January)
- China Crisis (27 January)
- Joe Cocker & Jennifer Warnes (27 January)
- Indeep (3 February)
- The Thompson Twins (10 February)
- Icehouse (17 February)
- Patti Austin & James Ingram (17 February)
- Eurythmics (24 February)
- Orange Juice (10 March)
- David Joseph (10 March)
- Mezzoforte (17 March)
- JoBoxers (23 March)
- Big Country (23 March)
- Nick Heyward (23 March)
- New Order (31 March)
- The Style Council (31 March)
- Tracey Ullman (31 March)
- Twisted Sister (7 April)
- Tracie (7 April)
- F.R. David (7 April)
- Sweet Dreams (14 April)
- Kissing the Pink (14 April)
- Sunfire (14 April)
- Phil Fearon & Galaxy (28 April)
- D Train (19 May)
- David Grant (19 May)
- Booker Newberry III (2 June)
- H_{2}O (8 June)
- The Truth (16 June)
- Marillion (16 June)
- Paul Young (30 June)
- Roman Holliday (7 July)
- The Mary Jane Girls (7 July)
- Jimmy the Hoover (7 July)
- Funk Masters (7 July)
- The Lotus Eaters (28 July)
- Robert Plant (28 July)
- Bruce Foxton (4 August)
- Carmel (25 August)
- Righeira (1 September)
- Annabel Lamb (8 September)
- Ryan Paris (8 September)
- Howard Jones (22 September)
- The Alarm (22 September)
- Lydia Murdock (13 October)
- King Kurt (27 October)
- Marilyn (10 November)
- Limahl (10 November)
- Aztec Camera (17 November)
- The Assembly (17 November)
- The Smiths (24 November)
- The Flying Pickets (1 December)
- Ozzy Osbourne (1 December)
- Dennis Waterman & George Cole (22 December)

== 1984 ==
- Frankie Goes to Hollywood (5 January)
- Frank Kelly (5 January)
- The Icicle Works (12 January)
- Snowy White (12 January)
- Joe Fagin (12 January)
- Fiction Factory (19 January)
- Madonna (26 January)
- Rick Springfield (26 January)
- Cyndi Lauper (26 January)
- Matthew Wilder (2 February)
- Juan Martin (2 February)
- Nik Kershaw (9 February)
- Swans Way (9 February)
- Matt Bianco (16 February)
- Nena (16 February)
- Alexei Sayle (1 March)
- Break Machine (1 March)
- Wang Chung (1 March)
- The Weather Girls (8 March)
- Sade (8 March)
- Julia & Company (15 March)
- Tina Turner (15 March)
- Scritti Politti (12 April)
- Dead or Alive (12 April)
- The Bluebells (19 April)
- Duran Duran (26 April)
- Jocelyn Brown (3 May)
- Terri Wells (10 May)
- Hazell Dean (17 May)
- Womack & Womack (17 May)
- Bronski Beat (7 June)
- The Art Company (14 June)
- Lloyd Cole & The Commotions (21 June)
- Alison Moyet (28 June)
- Shannon (5 July)
- Neil (12 July)
- Billy Idol (19 July)
- Kane Gang (19 July)
- Divine (19 July)
- Jeffrey Osborne (26 July)
- Windjammer (9 August)
- Alphaville (23 August)
- Miami Sound Machine (23 August)
- Animal Nightlife (27 September)
- John Waite (4 October)
- Julian Lennon (18 October)
- Meat Loaf (18 October)
- Feargal Sharkey (25 October)
- Eugene Wilde (25 October)
- Duran Duran (1 November)
- The Toy Dolls (13 December)
- The Council Collective (20 December)
- Band Aid (25 December)

== 1985 ==
- Smiley Culture (3 January)
- Sal Solo (3 January)
- Strawberry Switchblade (10 January)
- The Limit (17 January)
- Grandmaster Melle Mel and the Furious Five (17 January)
- Chaka Khan (24 January)
- King (24 January)
- Big Sound Authority (31 January)
- Art of Noise (31 January)
- The Colour Field (31 January)
- Sharpe & Numan (21 February)
- Don Henley (21 February)
- Bryan Adams (21 February)
- Stephen Duffy (28 February)
- Jermaine Jackson (7 March)
- Go West (14 March)
- Billy Bragg (21 March)
- Loose Ends (21 March)
- Glenn Frey (4 April)
- Phyllis Nelson (4 April)
- The Cool Notes (4 April)
- Jaki Graham (4 April)
- The Dream Academy (11 April)
- Marc Almond (25 April)
- New Model Army (2 May)
- Steve Arrington (9 May)
- Curtis Hairston (9 May)
- Jimmy Nail (16 May)
- Gary Moore (23 May)
- Mai Tai (6 June)
- Propaganda (6 June)
- Fine Young Cannibals (20 June)
- Sting (20 June)
- Harold Faltermeyer (20 June)
- The Commentators (27 June)
- Conway Brothers (11 July)
- Opus (11 July)
- Denise LaSalle (11 July)
- Simply Red (18 July)
- Russ Abbot (18 July)
- The Cult (18 July)
- Arrow (25 July)
- Trans-X (25 July)
- Five Star (1 August)
- Amazulu (8 August)
- Princess (8 August)
- Total Contrast (15 August)
- Lisa Lisa and Cult Jam (22 August)
- Baltimora (22 August)
- Dan Hartman (29 August)
- D Train (29 August)
- Rebecca Storm (5 September)
- Maria Vidal (12 September)
- Red Box (19 September)
- Midge Ure (19 September)
- Jennifer Rush (26 September)
- Colonel Abrams (3 October)
- Cameo (3 October)
- René & Angela (3 October)
- John Parr (24 October)
- Arcadia (24 October)
- Jan Hammer (24 October)
- A-ha (7 November)
- Dee C. Lee (21 November)
- Doug E. Fresh (21 November)
- Prefab Sprout (28 November)
- Pet Shop Boys (5 December)
- Aled Jones (19 December)

== 1986 ==
- Sophia George (2 January)
- Cherrelle & Alexander O'Neal (16 January)
- Mr. Mister (16 January)
- Nana Mouskouri (23 January)
- Double (6 February)
- Belouis Some (13 February)
- Latin Quarter (13 February)
- Paul Hardcastle & Carol Kenyon (20 February)
- Sigue Sigue Sputnik (27 February)
- Audrey Hall (27 February)
- Alexander O'Neal (27 February)
- The Bangles (27 February)
- Mike & The Mechanics (6 March)
- Whistle (6 March)
- The Blow Monkeys (13 March)
- Hipsway (13 March)
- Freddie Jackson (13 March)
- Samantha Fox (27 March)
- Tippa Irie (27 March)
- Big Audio Dynamite (3 April)
- Falco (3 April)
- It's Immaterial (17 April)
- George Michael (17 April)
- The SOS Band (24 April)
- Aurra (24 April)
- Maxi Priest (1 May)
- Joyce Sims (1 May)
- The Matchroom Mob (8 May)
- Doctor and the Medics (15 May)
- Pete Wylie (29 May)
- Ca$hflow (5 June)
- Lovebug Starski (11 June)
- Nu Shooz (19 June)
- Owen Paul (26 June)
- The Housemartins (3 July)
- Claire & Friends (3 July)
- Sly Fox (3 July)
- Midnight Star (10 July)
- The Real Roxanne with Hitman Howie Tee (10 July)
- Steve Winwood (17 July)
- Chris De Burgh (17 July)
- Stan Ridgway (17 July)
- Hollywood Beyond (24 July)
- Audrey Hall (24 July)
- Haywoode (24 July)
- Sinitta (7 August)
- It Bites (14 August)
- Anita Dobson (14 August)
- Bruce Hornsby & The Range (21 August)
- Modern Talking (21 August)
- Jermaine Stewart (28 August)
- MC Miker G & DJ Sven (4 September)
- Bon Jovi (4 September)
- Farley 'Jackmaster' Funk (4 September)
- Cutting Crew (11 September)
- The Psychedelic Furs (11 September)
- Timex Social Club (18 September)
- Michael McDonald (18 September)
- Julian Cope (9 October)
- Mel & Kim (30 October)
- Catherine Stock (30 October)
- Gwen Guthrie (30 October)
- Swing Out Sister (6 November)
- Bob Geldof (13 November)
- Erasure (20 November)
- Europe (20 November)
- Nick Kamen (27 November)
- Gregory Abbott (4 December)
- George Benson (11 December)
- The Gap Band (18 December)
- Boris Gardiner (25 December)

== 1987 ==
- Iggy Pop (15 January)
- Robbie Nevil (15 January)
- Curiosity Killed the Cat (22 January)
- Pepsi & Shirlie (29 January)
- Raze (29 January)
- Vesta Williams (29 January)
- Taffy (29 January)
- Westworld (19 February)
- Man 2 Man Meets Man Parrish (19 February)
- Eric Clapton (19 February)
- The Jets (26 February)
- Mental as Anything (26 February)
- The Christians (5 March)
- Al Jarreau (5 March)
- Boy George (12 March)
- The Mission (19 March)
- Terence Trent D'Arby (26 March)
- Janet Jackson (26 March)
- The Pogues (2 April)
- Ruby Turner (2 April)
- The Rainmakers (9 April)
- Judy Boucher (9 April)
- Living in a Box (16 April)
- Rikki (16 April)
- Glenn Hoddle & Chris Waddle (23 April)
- The Jesus & Mary Chain (30 April)
- Spear of Destiny (7 May)
- Sly & Robbie (7 May)
- Johnny Hates Jazz (14 May)
- Wet Wet Wet (21 May)
- Whitney Houston (21 May)
- Mirage (28 May)
- Donna Allen (28 May)
- John Farnham (11 June)
- Broken English (2 July)
- Black (9 July)
- Hue & Cry (16 July)
- Kenny G (16 July)
- Freddie McGregor (16 July)
- Spagna (6 August)
- Def Leppard (13 August)
- Rick Astley (13 August)
- Pseudo Echo (13 August)
- Wax (20 August)
- Sherrick (20 August)
- Then Jerico (27 August)
- T'Pau (27 August)
- LeVert (3 September)
- W.A.S.P. (10 September)
- Jonathan Butler (10 September)
- House Master Boyz & Rude Boy of House (17 September)
- Mick Jagger (24 September)
- The Sisters of Mercy (1 October)
- Jellybean with Steven Dante (8 October)
- Steve Walsh (8 October)
- Was (Not Was) (22 October)
- Ray Parker Jr (29 October)
- Scarlet Fantastic (29 October)
- Heartbeat (5 November)
- Eric B. & Rakim (5 November)
- The Proclaimers (19 November)
- Barry White (19 November)
- Donna Summer (19 November)
- Blue Mercedes (26 November)
- The Hooters (3 December)
- Paul McCartney (3 December)
- Krush (31 December)
- Climie Fisher (31 December)
- Morris Minor & The Majors (31 December)

== 1988 ==
- Bros (21 January)
- Debbie Gibson (28 January)
- Two Men, a Drum Machine and a Trumpet (28 January)
- Tiffany (28 January)
- The Screaming Blue Messiahs (4 February)
- Taylor Dayne (11 February)
- Sinéad O'Connor (11 February)
- Bomb the Bass (18 February)
- Coldcut with Yazz & The Plastic Population (18 February)
- The Primitives (25 February)
- Morrissey (25 February)
- Vanessa Paradis (25 February)
- Derek B (3 March)
- Taja Sevelle (10 March)
- Eighth Wonder (17 March)
- Aswad (17 March)
- Simon Harris (24 March)
- Glen Goldsmith (7 April)
- Adele Bertei (14 April)
- Pebbles (14 April)
- S-Express (21 April)
- Danny Wilson (21 April)
- Pat and Mick (28 April)
- Fairground Attraction (28 April)
- Will Downing (28 April)
- Magnum (5 May)
- Harry Enfield (12 May)
- The Adventures (12 May)
- Narada (12 May)
- Star Turn on 45 (Pints) (12 May)
- Ofra Haza (26 May)
- Hothouse Flowers (26 May)
- Mica Paris (26 May)
- The Timelords (9 June)
- Voice of the Beehive (9 June)
- Sabrina (16 June)
- The Pasadenas (23 June)
- UB40 & Chrissie Hynde (23 June)
- Everything But the Girl (7 July)
- Glenn Medeiros (7 July)
- Transvision Vamp (14 July)
- Wee Papa Girl Rappers (14 July)
- The Mac Band (21 July)
- Ziggy Marley and the Melody Makers (21 July)
- Kylie Minogue (4 August)
- The Funky Worm (4 August)
- All About Eve (4 August)
- Courtney Pine (11 August)
- Breathe (11 August)
- Tanita Tikaram (11 August)
- Brother Beyond (11 August)
- Jane Wiedlin (25 August)
- The Beatmasters (13 October)
- Enya (20 October)
- Milli Vanilli (27 October)
- Royal House (27 October)
- Deacon Blue (27 October)
- Robin Beck (10 November)
- Angry Anderson (8 December)
- Inner City (15 December)
- Neneh Cherry (22 December)
- Jason Donovan (22 December)

== 1989 ==
- The Darling Buds (12 January)
- Boy Meets Girl (12 January)
- Freiheit (12 January)
- The Cookie Crew (12 January)
- Roachford (19 December)
- Robert Howard & Kym Mazelle (19 January)
- Holly Johnson (19 January)
- Adeva (26 January)
- Rob Base & DJ E-Z Rock (26 January)
- Ten City (26 January)
- Michael Ball (9 February)
- Texas (16 February)
- Sam Brown (16 February)
- Edie Brickell & New Bohemians (23 February)
- Tyree (2 March)
- The Reynolds Girls (9 March)
- Paula Abdul (9 March)
- Chanelle (16 March)
- Fuzzbox (16 March)
- Soul II Soul featuring Caron Wheeler (16 March)
- Alyson Williams (23 March)
- Lisa Stansfield (23 March)
- The The (30 March)
- Paul Simpson (13 April)
- The London Boys (27 April)
- De La Soul (27 April)
- Edelweiss (4 May)
- Roxette (4 May)
- Live Report (4 May)
- Stevie Nicks (11 May)
- Lynne Hamilton (25 May)
- Double Trouble & Rebel MC (1 June)
- The Beautiful South (8 June)
- R.E.M. (15 June)
- Sonia (6 July)
- Monie Love (6 July)
- Waterfront (13 July)
- Gun (3 August)
- Wendy & Lisa (3 August)
- Big Fun (10 August)
- Dogs D'Amour (10 August)
- Shakespear's Sister (10 August)
- Liza Minnelli (10 August)
- Black Box (17 August)
- Martika (17 August)
- Betty Boo (24 August)
- Damian (31 August)
- Technotronic (14 September)
- Sydney Youngblood (14 September)
- The Wonder Stuff (21 September)
- Belinda Carlisle (12 October)
- Cathy Dennis (19 October)
- Deborah Harry (19 October)
- Rebel MC and Double Trouble (26 October)
- Chris Rea (26 October)
- Living in a Box (26 October)
- De La Soul (26 October)
- Lisa Stansfield (26 October)
- Adeva (26 October)
- Electribe 101 (9 November)
- Linda Ronstadt & Aaron Neville (9 November)
- 808 State (16 November)
- Jimmy Somerville (16 November)
- The Stone Roses (23 November)
- The Happy Mondays (23 November)
- Kaoma (30 November)
- Rob 'n' Raz with Leila K (30 November)
- Van Morrison (14 December)
- Electronic (14 December)
- FPI Project (21 December)

== 1990 ==
- Quireboys (4 January)
- Fish (11 January)
- Halo James (18 January)
- Yell! (26 January)
- Del Amitri (26 January)
- Adamski (26 January)
- Lonnie Gordon (2 February)
- Wrecks-N-Effect (2 February)
- And Why Not? (2 February)
- House of Love (2 February)
- Beats International featuring Lindy Layton (8 February)
- The Wedding Present (15 February)
- Sybil (15 February)
- Guru Josh (22 February)
- Jamie J. Morgan (1 March)
- Michael Bolton (1 March)
- JT and the Big Family (8 March)
- Candy Flip (15 March)
- Primal Scream (15 March)
- Inspiral Carpets (15 March)
- Orbital (22 March)
- Snap! (22 March)
- They Might Be Giants (22 March)
- Bizz Nizz (29 March)
- The Family Stand (29 March)
- Jam Tronik (29 March)
- Emma (5 April)
- Jesus Jones (12 April)
- Alannah Myles (19 April)
- The Adventures of Stevie V (19 April)
- Faith No More (19 April)
- Pat and Mick (26 April)
- Unique 3 (26 April)
- Jesus Jones (26 April)
- Tongue 'n' Cheek (26 April)
- B.B.G. featuring Dina Taylor (3 May)
- Mantronix (10 May)
- The Chimes (18 May)
- The B-52's (24 May)
- En Vogue (24 May)
- Don Pablo's Animals (24 May)
- Chad Jackson (31 May)
- Pop Will Eat Itself (7 June)
- MC Tunes (7 June)
- Maureen (14 June)
- Massivo (5 July)
- River City People (12 July)
- Blue Pearl (12 July)
- Thunder (12 July)
- The Soup Dragons (12 July)
- Craig McLachlan (19 July)
- Dream Warriors (19 July)
- Little Angels (2 August)
- Bell Biv Devoe (2 August)
- Bombalurina (9 August)
- The KLF (16 August)
- The Farm (6 September)
- Londonbeat (13 September)
- Bass-O-Matic (13 September)
- Maria McKee (13 September)
- Twenty 4 Seven (20 September)
- The Charlatans (20 September)
- Innocence (18 October)
- Kim Appleby (1 November)
- EMF (8 November)
- The La's (8 November)
- Julee Cruise (22 November)
- Dimples D (29 November)
- Chris Isaak (29 November)
- Malandra Burrows (13 December)
- Seal (13 December)

== 1991 ==
- Soho (19 January)
- The KLF (19 January)
- Off-Shore (24 January)
- Nomad featuring MC Mikee Freedom (24 January)
- Praise (24 January)
- Oleta Adams (7 February)
- Kenny Thomas (7 February)
- The Railway Children (14 February)
- D.J.H. (21 February)
- Xpansions (21 February)
- N-Joi (28 February)
- Massive Attack (28 February)
- Hale and Pace (7 March)
- Quartz featuring Dina Carroll (7 March)
- Ned's Atomic Dustbin (7 March)
- Chesney Hawkes (14 March)
- Ride (14 March)
- Banderas (21 March)
- Dannii Minogue (28 March)
- Gary Clail (28 March)
- James (28 March)
- Definition of Sound (28 March)
- The Mock Turtles (4 April)
- Alison Limerick (11 April)
- Zucchero (18 April)
- Vic Reeves (25 April)
- Blur (25 April)
- Samantha Janus (2 May)
- Frances Nero (2 May)
- Beverley Craven (8 May)
- T99 (9 May)
- New Kids on the Block (16 May)
- Crystal Waters (16 May)
- Amy Grant (30 May)
- Northside (6 June)
- Lenny Kravitz (13 June)
- LaTour (20 June)
- Driza Bone (20 June)
- Bette Midler (20 June)
- Color Me Badd (20 June)
- Cubic 22 (27 June)
- Omar (27 June)
- Divinyls (27 June)
- Incognito (4 July)
- Cola Boy (4 July)
- The Shamen (25 July)
- Frankie Knuckles (25 July)
- Right Said Fred (1 August)
- Young Disciples (8 August)
- Sophie Lawrence (15 August)
- P.M. Dawn (15 August)
- Zoe (22 August)
- Oceanic (22 August)
- Marky Mark and the Funky Bunch (29 August)
- Arnee and the Terminaters (29 August)
- Tin Machine (29 August)
- Utah Saints (5 September)
- Bizarre Inc (12 September)
- Sabrina Johnston (12 September)
- Rozalla (12 September)
- Brothers in Rhythm (19 September)
- Carl Cox (10 October)
- Marc Cohn (10 October)
- Monty Python (17 October)
- Kiri Ti Kanawa (24 October)
- Carter the Unstoppable Sex Machine (24 October)
- Mariah Carey (24 October)
- SL2 (31 October)
- Congress (31 October)
- Moby (31 October)
- Crowded House (7 November)
- K-Klass (7 November)
- Control (7 November)
- Altern-8 (14 November)
- M People (21 November)
- Bassheads (21 November)
- Love Decade (21 November)
- Scorpions (21 November)
- East Side Beat (28 November)
- Nirvana (28 November)
- Shades of Rhythm (5 December)
- Diana Ross (5 December)
- Digital (Orgasm) (12 December)
- UK Mixmasters (19 December)
- Shaft (19 December)
- Human Resource (19 December)
- 2 Unlimited (25 December)

== 1992 ==
- The Sugarcubes (9 January)
- Isotonik (9 January)
- Senseless Things (9 January)
- Ce Ce Peniston (16 January)
- Des'ree (16 January)
- Curtis Stigers (23 January)
- Public Enemy (23 January)
- Kicks Like a Mule (30 January)
- Dream Frequency (30 January)
- Manic Street Preachers (30 January)
- DNA (30 January)
- Brand New Heavies (20 February)
- Julia Fordham (20 February)
- Opus III (20 February)
- Shanice (20 February)
- New Atlantic (27 February)
- Toxic Two (12 March)
- Clivilles and Cole (12 March)
- Annie Lennox (12 March)
- Liquid (19 March)
- Vanessa Williams (26 March)
- Praga Khan (9 April)
- Ten Sharp (16 April)
- KWS (7 May)
- Kris Kross (14 May)
- Celine Dion and Peabo Bryson (14 May)
- Richard Marx (21 May)
- Future Sound of London (28 May)
- Shut Up and Dance (28 May)
- Don-E (28 May)
- Take That (4 June)
- The Orb (18 June)
- TLC (25 June)
- Tori Amos (25 June)
- Megadeth (25 June)
- Arrested Development (2 July)
- Smart E's (9 July)
- Urban Hype (9 July)
- Sophie B. Hawkins (16 July)
- Sunscreem (23 July)
- Jon Secada (23 July)
- Undercover (13 August)
- Felix (20 August)
- Paul Weller (20 August)
- Billy Ray Cyrus (27 August)
- Dr Alban (3 September)
- U96 (3 September)
- East 17 (10 September)
- Daniel O'Donnell (17 September)
- Messiah (24 September)
- Suede (24 September)
- Tasmin Archer (24 September)
- Stereo MC's (1 October)
- Dr Spin (1 October)
- Boyz II Men (15 October)
- Bjorn Again (22 October)
- Chippendales (22 October)
- Felix (29 October)
- Rage (29 October)
- Rocking Birds (5 November)
- INXS (5 November)
- Ambassadors of Funk (12 November)
- Charles and Eddie (12 November)
- Shai (10 December)
- The Trammps (10 December)
- The Lemonheads (17 December)

== 1993 ==
- The Frank and Walters (7 January)
- Slipstreem (7 January)
- Apache Indian (7 January)
- West End (14 January)
- The Beloved (21 January)
- The S.O.U.L. S.Y.S.T.E.M. (21 January)
- Usura (28 January)
- Rapination (4 February)
- Gloworm (4 February)
- Saint Etienne (11 February)
- Shaggy (25 February)
- Marxman (4 March)
- Runrig (4 March)
- Jamiroquai (11 March)
- Snow (18 March)
- Therapy? (18 March)
- The Grid (18 March)
- Jade (25 March)
- Robin S (25 March)
- Bobby Womack (15 March)
- Cappella (1 April)
- Sub Sub featuring Melanie Williams (8 April)
- World Party (15 April)
- D:Ream (29 April)
- SWV (29 April)
- Dance 2 Trance (29 April)
- Ace of Base (6 May)
- Kingmaker (6 May)
- Luther Vandross (20 May)
- Louchie Lou and Michie One (27 May)
- Haddaway (3 June)
- Chaka Demus and Pliers (10 June)
- The Time Frequency (17 June)
- Gabrielle (17 June)
- Brian May (24 June)
- Joey Lawrence (1 July)
- Evolution (1 July)
- 4 Non Blondes (1 July)
- Oui 3 (15 July)
- Shara Nelson (22 July)
- Urban Cookie Collective (22 July)
- The Waterboys (22 July)
- Juliet Roberts (5 August)
- Michelle Gayle (5 August)
- Bitty McLean (5 August)
- Green Jellÿ (12 August)
- Sarah Washington (12 August)
- Bad Boys Inc (12 August)
- Culture Beat (12 August)
- Aftershock (19 August)
- Sinclair (19 August)
- Björk (9 September)
- Stone Temple Pilots (9 September)
- Radiohead (16 September)
- Stakka Bo (23 September)
- Eternal (30 September)
- The Spin Doctors (30 September)
- One Dove (14 October)
- Lena Fiagbe (21 October)
- David Hasselhoff (28 October)
- Aerosmith (4 November)
- Pauline Henry (4 November)
- Captain Hollywood Project (11 November)
- Lesley Garrett and Amanda Thompson (18 November)
- K7 (23 December)
- EYC (23 December)

== 1994 ==
- DJ Duke (6 January)
- Joe (27 January)
- ZZ Top (27 January)
- Wendy Moten (3 February)
- Joe Roberts (3 February)
- Elastica (10 February)
- The Cranberries (10 February)
- Carleen Anderson (10 February)
- The Wildhearts (17 February)
- Beck (17 February)
- Barbara Tucker (3 March)
- Doop (10 March)
- Marcella Detroit (10 March)
- Soul Asylum (24 March)
- Worlds Apart (24 March)
- Frances Ruffelle (31 March)
- Smash (31 March)
- Black Machine (7 April)
- Tony Di Bart (7 April)
- Terrorvision (14 April)
- Reel 2 Real (14 April)
- Loveland (14 April)
- Garth Brooks (14 April)
- C.J. Lewis (21 April)
- Crash Test Dummies (21 April)
- Skin (28 April)
- Clubhouse (28 April)
- Judy Cheeks (5 May)
- Stiltskin (5 May)
- Evan Dando (5 May)
- Maxx (26 May)
- Bruce Dickinson (26 May)
- Galliano (26 May)
- All-4-One (26 May)
- Big Mountain (2 June)
- Pulp (2 June)
- Dawn Penn (9 June)
- Toni Braxton (16 June)
- Shed Seven (23 June)
- Let Loose (30 June)
- Oasis (30 June)
- These Animal Men (30 June)
- 2 Cowboys (7 July)
- Blackgirl (14 July)
- China Black (14 July)
- House of Pain (14 July)
- PJ & Duncan (21 July)
- Shampoo (28 July)
- Red Dragon with Brian and Tony Gold (28 July)
- DJ Miko (11 August)
- Tinman (18 August)
- Dinosaur Jr. (25 August)
- Sean Maguire (1 September)
- Youssou N’Dour (1 September)
- Corona (8 September)
- M-Beat with General Levy (15 September)
- Whigfield (15 September)
- Naomi Campbell (22 September)
- Lisa Loeb & Nine Stories (22 September)
- Shane MacGowan and The Popes (29 September)
- 2wo Third3 (13 October)
- Ultimate Kaos (20 October)
- Green Day (27 October)
- Sheryl Crow (3 November)
- Salt-N-Pepa (3 November)
- (MC Sar &) The Real McCoy (10 November)
- The Saw Doctors (10 November)
- Urge Overkill (17 November)
- Boyzone (8 December)
- Rednex (15 December)
- Zig & Zag (22 December)
- Pato Banton (25 December)

== 1995 ==
- R Kelly (5 January)
- N-Trance (12 January)
- The Lightning Seeds (12 January)
- Nicki French (12 January)
- The Almighty (12 January)
- Sleeper (19 January)
- Deuce (26 January)
- MN8 (2 February)
- Scarlet (2 February)
- Perfecto Allstarz (2 February)
- The Go-Go's (9 February)
- Alex Party (16 February)
- Vanessa Mae (16 February)
- Glam Metal Detectives (23 February)
- Boo Radleys (9 March)
- Clock (9 March)
- The Outhere Brothers (16 March)
- Freak Power (16 March)
- New Power Generation (16 March)
- Tin Tin Out (23 March)
- Leftfield with Toni Halliday (23 March)
- Love City Groove (23 March)
- Strike (30 March)
- Brownstone (30 March)
- Menswear (30 March)
- Hole (30 March)
- Grace (6 April)
- Ranking Roger (6 April)
- Tina Arena (13 April)
- Joshua Kadison (4 May)
- Adina Howard (4 May)
- Skunk Anansie (4 May)
- Supergrass (11 May)
- Montell Jordan (11 May)
- Scatman John (11 May)
- Blessid Union of Souls (11 May)
- Livin' Joy (11 May)
- Billie Ray Martin (18 May)
- McAlmont & Butler (18 May)
- Robson & Jerome (18 May)
- Nightcrawlers (25 May)
- Radiohead (25 May)
- Reef (1 June)
- Black Grape (1 June)
- Dodgy (8 June)
- Jam and Spoon (8 June)
- Edwyn Collins (15 June)
- Diana King (6 July)
- PJ Harvey (6 July)
- Jinny (13 July)
- Cast (13 July)
- Dana Dawson (20 July)
- Mary Kiani (10 August)
- Ash (10 August)
- Suggs (10 August)
- Moist (17 August)
- The Original (17 August)
- Guru (17 August)
- JX (17 August)
- Berri (31 August)
- De'Lacy (31 August)
- The Rembrandts (31 August)
- Echobelly (31 August)
- Roy Chubby Brown (7 September)
- Lloyd Cole (14 September)
- Umboza (21 September)
- Garbage (28 September)
- Louise (5 October)
- Nick Cave & The Bad Seeds (5 October)
- Wildchild (19 October)
- Coolio (26 October)
- Bonnie Raitt (2 November)
- Ruffneck (9 November)
- Whale (9 November)
- Happy Clappers (16 November)
- The Childliners (30 November)
- Molella (7 December)
- Levellers (7 December)
- Mike Flowers Pops (14 December)
- Dog Eat Dog (21 December)

== 1996 ==
- Dubstar (4 January)
- Gene (11 January)
- Dreadzone (11 January)
- Babylon Zoo (11 January)
- The Bucketheads (18 January)
- Lush (18 January)
- Solo (18 January)
- Goldbug (25 January)
- Upside Down (25 January)
- 3T (25 January)
- QFX (1 February)
- The Bluetones (1 February)
- Northern Uproar (1 February)
- Technohead (1 February)
- BT (8 February)
- Joan Osborne (8 February)
- Lighthouse Family (8 February)
- Ocean Colour Scene (15 February)
- Alcatraz (15 February)
- Gusto (29 February)
- Sasha & Maria Nayler (7 March)
- Gat Decor (7 March)
- Mark Morrison (14 March)
- Peter Andre (14 March)
- Robert Miles (14 March)
- Bis (14 March)
- Kaliphz (21 March)
- Ken Doh (21 March)
- Gina G (28 March)
- Kadoc (4 April)
- DJ Dado (4 April)
- Paul Carrack (11 April)
- Longpigs (11 April)
- Alanis Morissette (18 April)
- Lisa Marie Experience (25 April)
- Chantay Savage (2 May)
- Smashing Pumpkins (2 May)
- Busta Rhymes (9 May)
- The Tony Rich Project (9 May)
- Horace Brown (16 May)
- 1300 Drums (16 May)
- John Alford (23 May)
- Backstreet Boys (30 May)
- Darren Day (7 June)
- Space (7 June)
- The Fugees (7 June)
- Pianoman (14 June)
- The Divine Comedy (28 June)
- Kula Shaker (5 July)
- Gary Barlow (5 July)
- Super Furry Animals (12 July)
- Rock Therapy (19 July)
- Los Del Rio (19 July)
- Joyrider (26 July)
- Robbie Williams (26 July)
- OMC (2 August)
- Alisha's Attic (2 August)
- The Spice Girls (2 August)
- Me Me Me (9 August)
- Donna Lewis (23 August)
- Fluffy (30 August)
- Rocket from the Crypt (6 September)
- Stretch & Vern (13 September)
- Way Out West (13 September)
- Deep Blue Something (13 September)
- The Power Station (27 September)
- Healy & Amos (11 October)
- Babybird (11 October)
- Bally Sagoo (18 October)
- Blackstreet (18 October)
- Sneaker Pimps (18 October)
- Faithless (25 October)
- E-Motion (25 October)
- 911 (8 November)
- The Woolpackers (15 November)
- Mark Owen (15 November)
- Dublane (29 November)
- Mansun (6 December)
- No Way Sis (6 December)
- Damage (13 December)
- Snoop Doggy Dogg (13 December)

== 1997 ==
- Kenickie (10 January)
- Kavana (10 January)
- Dirty Rotten Scoundrels (17 January)
- No Mercy (17 January)
- Placebo (17 January)
- Byron Stingily (24 January)
- Ginuwine (24 January)
- The Supernaturals (7 February)
- Amen! UK (7 February)
- Nuyorican Soul (7 February)
- Bush (7 February)
- OTT (14 February)
- Apollo 440 (14 February)
- Eels (14 February)
- DJ Kool (21 February)
- Warren G (21 February)
- No Doubt (21 February)
- Republica (28 February)
- Sash! (28 February)
- Monaco (14 March)
- 3 Colours Red (14 March)
- DJ Quicksilver (4 April)
- Funky Green Dogs (11 April)
- Smoke City (11 April)
- Shola Ama (18 April)
- Katrina and the Waves (9 May)
- The Seahorses (9 May)
- North and South (16 May)
- Mary J. Blige (16 May)
- Olive (16 May)
- Andrea Bocelli (23 May)
- Rosie Gaines (30 May)
- Bebe Winans (30 May)
- Hanson (6 June)
- Jon Bon Jovi (13 June)
- Finley Quaye (20 June)
- Ultra Naté (4 July)
- Fun Lovin' Criminals (4 July)
- Paula Cole (4 July)
- Teenage Fanclub (11 July)
- Todd Terry (11 July)
- Gala (18 July)
- Changing Faces (25 July)
- Universal (1 August)
- Meredith Brooks (1 August)
- Robyn (15 August)
- Chumbawamba (22 August)
- Stereophonics (22 August)
- Conner Reeves (29 August)
- Tina Moore (29 August)
- Symposium (29 August)
- All Saints (5 September)
- N-Tyce (12 September)
- Ricky Martin (19 September)
- The Sundays (19 September)
- Dario G (26 September)
- Bellini (26 September)
- Catch (10 October)
- Aqua (24 October)
- Jimmy Ray (24 October)
- Smash Mouth (24 October)
- Double 99 (31 October)
- Puff Daddy (31 October)
- Natalie Imbruglia (7 November)
- Embrace (7 November)
- PF Project (14 November)
- Errol Brown (21 November)
- Metallica (21 November)
- Steven Houghton (28 November)
- Five (12 December)
- Chicken Shed (19 December)

== 1998 ==
- Steps (9 January)
- Vanilla (9 January)
- Rialto (16 January)
- Ian Brown (23 January)
- Catatonia (30 January)
- Usher (30 January)
- The Freestylers (6 February)
- Cleopatra (13 February)
- Headswim (13 February)
- Jay-Z featuring Gwen Dickey (13 February)
- Wes (13 February)
- Spiritualized (13 February)
- Hurricane #1 (20 February)
- Lilys (20 February)
- Air (20 February)
- Lutricia McNeal (20 February)
- Another Level (27 February)
- Shania Twain (27 February)
- Rest Assured (27 February)
- Will Mellor (27 February)
- Cornershop (27 February)
- Hinda Hicks (6 March)
- Cast of Casualty (13 March)
- Lionrock (13 March)
- Alexia (20 March)
- Destiny's Child (27 March)
- The All Seeing I (27 March)
- Tin Tin Out with Shelley Nelson (27 March)
- Savage Garden (3 April)
- Prince Buster (3 April)
- Billie Myers (10 April)
- Jimmy Page (10 April)
- Mase (17 April)
- Ultra (17 April)
- K-Ci & JoJo (17 April)
- Ben Folds Five (17 April)
- Mighty Mighty Bosstones (24 April)
- The Tamperer featuring Maya (24 April)
- Tzant (24 April)
- The Mavericks (1 May)
- The Jungle Brothers (8 May)
- LeAnn Rimes (8 May)
- Imaani (8 May)
- The Corrs (15 May)
- Wyclef Jean (15 May)
- Adam Garcia (15 May)
- Bus Stop (22 May)
- Beverley Knight (29 May)
- N.Y.C.C. (29 May)
- Mousse T (5 June)
- B*Witched (5 June)
- Silver Sun (19 June)
- Fat Les (19 June)
- Baddiel & Skinner (19 June)
- Imajin (26 June)
- Canibus (26 June)
- Dana International (26 June)
- Karen Ramirez (26 June)
- Eagle-Eye Cherry (3 July)
- Aaron Carter (3 July)
- Matthew Marsden (10 July)
- Billie Piper (10 July)
- Pras Michel featuring O.D.B. & Mýa (17 July)
- Echobeatz (24 July)
- Lovestation (31 July)
- Charli Baltimore (31 July)
- Lucid (7 August)
- Baby Bumps (7 August)
- Solid Harmonie (14 August)
- Sweetbox (21 August)
- Alda (28 August)
- Foo Fighters (28 August)
- Honeyz (4 September)
- Jennifer Paige (11 September)
- Cam'ron (18 September)
- Deetah (25 September)
- Melanie B with Missy Elliott (25 September)
- Fastball (2 October)
- Sarah McLachlan (2 October)
- Brandy (9 October)
- The Cause (9 October)
- The Cardigans (16 October)
- Monica (16 October)
- Meja (23 October)
- Dru Hill (23 October)
- Spacedust (23 October)
- Lynden David Hall (30 October)
- Kele Le Roc (30 October)
- Touch & Go (6 November)
- Pras (6 November)
- Tatyana Ali (13 November)
- Faith Evans (13 November)
- The Vengaboys (27 November)
- Ruff Driverz (27 November)
- Vonda Shepard (4 December)
- Melanie C (11 December)
- Emilia (11 December)
- Denise & Johnny (25 December)
- Jane McDonald (25 December)

== 1999 ==
- Blockster (15 January)
- Da Click (15 January)
- Justin (15 January)
- Emmie (22 January)
- TQ (29 January)
- Sebadoh (29 January)
- Gay Dad (29 January)
- The Offspring (29 January)
- Leilani (5 February)
- Armand Van Helden (5 February)
- A+ (12 February)
- Mirrorball (12 February)
- Soulsearcher (12 February)
- Precious (12 February)
- Next of Kin (19 February)
- Unkle (19 February)
- The Moffatts (19 February)
- Barenaked Ladies (19 February)
- Sister Sway (19 February)
- N-Sync (26 February)
- Lauryn Hill (26 February)
- Alberta (26 February)
- Jay (5 March)
- Travis (19 March)
- Tina Cousins (26 March)
- Cartoons (2 April)
- The New Radicals (2 April)
- Phats & Small (9 April)
- Eminem (9 April)
- Glamma Kid (16 April)
- Martine McCutcheon (16 April)
- Westlife (30 April)
- Fierce (14 May)
- Pete Heller (14 May)
- Powerhouse (21 May)
- 1000 Clowns (21 May)
- Sugar Ray (28 May)
- Sixpence None the Richer (28 May)
- Hepburn (28 May)
- The Wiseguys (4 June)
- Chicane with (Maire Brennan) (4 June)
- 21st Century Girls (11 June)
- Feeder (11 June)
- Red Hot Chili Peppers (11 June)
- S Club 7 (18 June)
- Lit (25 June)
- Adam Rickitt (25 June)
- The Three Amigos (2 July)
- A1 (2 July)
- Jennifer Lopez (2 July)
- ATB (2 July)
- Lolly (9 July)
- Semisonic (9 July)
- The 3 Jays (30 July)
- DJ Jurgen with Alice Deejay (30 July)
- Dope Smugglaz (6 August)
- Marvin & Tamara (6 August)
- Groove Armada (6 August)
- 702 (6 August)
- Ronan Keating (6 August)
- Bran Van 3000 (20 August)
- Lou Bega (3 September)
- Enrique Iglesias (10 September)
- A.T.F.C. (29 October)
- Macy Gray (5 November)
- Semisonic (5 November)
- Emma Bunton (12 November)
- Mr Vegas (12 November)
- Geri Halliwell (12 November)
- Wamdue Project (26 November)
- Mario Piu (10 December)
- Artful Dodger with Craig David (10 December)
- Atomic Kitten (10 December)
- Len (17 December)
- Progress (17 December)
- Eiffel 65 (25 December)

== 2000 ==
- DJ Luck & MC Neat (14 January)
- Dark Star (14 January)
- Donell Jones (21 January)
- Point Break (21 January)
- Scooch (21 January)
- Cheb Mami (28 January)
- Nu Generation (28 January)
- Hi-Gate (28 January)
- Scanty Sandwich (28 January)
- Mint Royale (4 February)
- Lyte Funky Ones (4 February)
- Andreas Johnson (4 February)
- Daphne & Celeste (4 February)
- Sisqo (11 February)
- Joey Negro & Taka Boom (18 February)
- Rebecca Wheatley (25 February)
- CRW (25 February)
- Christina Aguilera (25 February)
- Jamelia (3 March)
- Kelis (3 March)
- Lene Marlin (17 March)
- Barbara Tucker & Darryl D'Bonneau (17 March)
- Blink-182 (24 March)
- Santana (31 March)
- Moloko (31 March)
- M2M (31 March)
- N'n'G & Kallaghan (31 March)
- Idlewild (7 April)
- Angie Stone (14 April)
- Sweet Female Attitude (14 April)
- Bloodhound Gang (14 April)
- Lock 'n' Load (14 April)
- Lonestar (14 April)
- Sisqo (21 April)
- Jessica Simpson (21 April)
- Black Box Recorder (21 April)
- Fragma (21 April)
- True Steppers with Dane Bowers (28 April)
- Cypress Hill (28 April)
- MJ Cole (5 May)
- Mandy Moore (5 May)
- System F (5 May)
- Oxide & Neutrino (5 May)
- Made in London (12 May)
- Toploader (12 May)
- Heather Small (19 May)
- Madison Avenue (19 May)
- Madasun (26 May)
- Southside Spinners (26 May)
- Bentley Rhythm Ace (26 May)
- Sia (2 June)
- Belle & Sebastian (2 June)
- Hybrid (2 June)
- Sonique (2 June)
- Stephen Gately (9 June)
- Pink (9 June)
- York (9 June)
- Dr. Dre (9 June)
- Trevor and Simon (9 June)
- Mary Mary (9 June)
- Angelic (16 June)
- Muse (16 June)
- B-15 Project (16 June)
- Richard Blackwood (16 June)
- Darude (16 June)
- Black Legend (23 June)
- Girl Thing (30 June)
- David Gray (30 June)
- Lonyo (7 July)
- Samantha Mumba (7 July)
- Coldplay (7 July)
- Sid Owen (7 July)
- Marc et Claude (21 July)
- Aaliyah (21 July)
- Shanks & Bigfoot (28 July)
- Bomfunk MC's (4 August)
- Wookie (11 August)
- Storm (11 August)
- Ruff Endz (18 August)
- Spiller (18 August)
- True Steppers with Victoria Beckham (25 August)
- Christian Falk (25 August)
- JJ72 (25 August)
- Baby D (1 September)
- Robbie Rivera (1 September)
- Tru Faith & Dub Conspiracy (8 September)
- Limp Bizkit (8 September)
- Planet Perfecto (15 September)
- Modjo (15 September)
- Vanessa Amorosi (22 September)
- Sugababes (22 September)
- Aurora with Naimee Coleman (22 September)
- Anastacia (29 September)
- Kernkraft 400 (29 September)
- Architechs (6 October)
- Baha Men (13 October)
- Azzido Da Bass (20 October)
- The Tweenies (10 November)
- Kandi (10 November)
- Lucy Pearl (24 November)
- Public Domain (1 December)
- True Party (1 December)
- So Solid Crew (15 December)

== 2001 ==
- Mauro Picotto (12 January)
- Rui da Silva (12 January)
- David Morales (19 January)
- Misteeq (19 January)
- Boom! (26 January)
- Spooks (26 January)
- Safri Duo (2 February)
- Wheatus (16 February)
- Papa Roach (16 February)
- Starsailor (16 February)
- Dido (16 February)
- BBMak (23 February)
- Jakatta (23 February)
- My Vitriol (23 February)
- Debelah Morgan (23 February)
- Ja Rule with Christina Milian (2 March)
- Nelly Furtado (9 March)
- Kaci (9 March)
- Dream (16 March)
- Lindsay Dracass (16 March)
- Chocolate Puma (23 March)
- Crazy Town (23 March)
- Roni Size (23 March)
- Hear'Say (23 March)
- M & S (6 April)
- Chante Moore (6 April)
- Lil Bow Wow (13 April)
- Faith Hill (20 April)
- Linkin Park (20 April)
- O-Town (27 April)
- Turin Brakes (11 May)
- Jason Downs (11 May)
- Eve (18 May)
- My Vitriol (18 May)
- A-Teens (25 May)
- Mark B (25 May)
- Blue (1 June)
- 3LW (1 June)
- Sunshine Anderson (1 June)
- DJ Pied Piper (1 June)
- Ray J (15 June)
- Marti Pellow (15 June)
- Boris Dlugosch (15 June)
- Allstars (22 June)
- India Arie (29 June)
- Backyard Dog (6 July)
- The Strokes (6 July)
- Weezer (13 July)
- OPM (13 July)
- Roger Sanchez (13 July)
- Ian Van Dahl (20 July)
- Cosmic Rough Riders (3 August)
- Black Crowes (3 August)
- Cosmic Gate (3 August)
- Train (10 August)
- Raven Maize (17 August)
- Zero 7 (17 August)
- Sophie Ellis-Bextor (24 August)
- Shade Sheist (24 August)
- Little Trees (31 August)
- Kosheen (31 August)
- American Hi-Fi (7 September)
- Lifehouse (7 September)
- Staind (14 September)
- Spiritualized (14 September)
- Melanie Blatt (14 September)
- DJ Ötzi (21 September)
- Alien Ant Farm (28 September)
- Silicone Soul (5 October)
- Liberty X (5 October)
- Jean Jacques Smoothie (12 October)
- Sum 41 (12 October)
- Bell & Spurling (12 October)
- The Ones (19 October)
- Brian Harvey (26 October)
- The Wiseguys (26 October)
- City High (2 November)
- Push (2 November)
- Par-T-One (2 November)
- Andrew WK (9 November)
- The Dandy Warhols (9 November)
- Alicia Keys (9 November)
- iiO (9 November)
- Afroman (9 November)
- The Strokes (16 November)
- D-12 (16 November)
- The White Stripes (23 November)
- Ryan Adams (7 December)
- PPK (7 December)
- Basement Jaxx (7 December)
- Daniel Bedingfield (7 December)
- Roger Sanchez (14 December)
- Sum 41 (14 December)
- Nicole Kidman (14 December)
- Kosheen (21 December)

== 2002 ==
- Dreamcatcher (11 January)
- Lange (18 January)
- Goldtrix (18 January)
- DJ Alligator (18 January)
- Britney Spears (18 January)
- Flip & Fill with Kelly Llorenna (1 February)
- P.O.D. (1 February)
- Incubus (1 February)
- The Cooper Temple Clause (8 February)
- Jimmy Eat World (8 February)
- Elbow (15 February)
- The Hives (22 February)
- DB Boulevard (22 February)
- Timo Maas (22 February)
- Puddle of Mudd (22 February)
- Ali G (22 February)
- A (1 March)
- Princess Superstar (1 March)
- Lasgo (8 March)
- City High (8 March)
- Shakira (8 March)
- Nickelback (8 March)
- Distant Soundz (8 March)
- Rik Waller (15 March)
- Electric Soft Parade (15 March)
- Platinum 45's (15 March)
- Hundred Reasons (15 March)
- Will Young (15 March)
- Warren Stacey (22 March)
- The Lostprophets (22 March)
- Darren Hayes (29 March)
- Cassius Henry (29 March)
- Gareth Gates (29 March)
- Shy FX & T Power (5 April)
- Michelle Branch (12 April)
- Ladies First (12 April)
- 3SL (19 April)
- 1 Giant Leap (19 April)
- The Vines (19 April)
- X-Press 2 with David Byrne (19 April)
- Pay as U Go (26 April)
- Doves (26 April)
- Holly Valance (26 April)
- S Club Juniors (3 May)
- Haven (3 May)
- Mad Donna (3 May)
- Shakedown (10 May)
- Tweet (10 May)
- 4 Strings (10 May)
- H & Claire (17 May)
- Bellefire (17 May)
- Russell Watson & Faye Tozer (17 May)
- Hundred Reasons (17 May)
- Nigel & Marvin (17 May)
- The Reelists (24 May)
- Jessica Garlick (24 May)
- Milk Inc (24 May)
- Rhianna (31 May)
- Ms Dynamite (31 May)
- Bell & Spurling (7 June)
- Agnelli & Nelson (14 June)
- Moony (14 June)
- Paul Oakenfold (21 June)
- Scooter (21 June)
- Ludacris (21 June)
- JXL (21 June)
- The Vines (28 June)
- The Calling (5 July)
- The Space Cowboy (5 July)
- Amy Studt (12 July)
- Tim Deluxe (19 July)
- DJ Marky & XRS (19 July)
- Fischerspooner (19 July)
- Ashanti (19 July)
- Dee Dee (19 July)
- The Coral (26 July)
- D-Mac (26 July)
- Beyoncé (26 July)
- Vanessa Carlton (2 August)
- Natural (9 August)
- Narcotic Thrust (9 August)
- N.E.R.D (9 August)
- Darius (9 August)
- Mad'House (16 August)
- ATC (16 August)
- Bowling for Soup (16 August)
- Romeo (23 August)
- B2K (23 August)
- The Music (30 August)
- Truth Hurts (30 August)
- Abs (30 August)
- Milky (30 August)
- Blazin' Squad (30 August)
- Jurgen Vries (13 September)
- Appleton (13 September)
- Kelly Osbourne (20 September)
- Sarah Whatmore (20 September)
- Busted (27 September)
- Aqualung (27 September)
- Beenie Man (27 September)
- Richard Ashcroft (4 October)
- The Datsuns (4 October)
- Avril Lavigne (4 October)
- Justin Timberlake (11 October)
- Nick Carter (18 October)
- Las Ketchup (18 October)
- Badly Drawn Boy (25 October)
- L.L. Cool J (25 October)
- Big Brovaz (25 October)
- Who Da Funk (1 November)
- Rosie Ribbons (1 November)
- The Streets (1 November)
- DJ Sammy (8 November)
- Queens of the Stone Age (15 November)
- Rainbow (13 December)
- The Cheeky Girls (13 December)
- One True Voice (20 December)
- Girls Aloud (25 December)

== 2003 ==
- David Sneddon (10 January)
- Audio Bullys (17 January)
- Divine Inspiration (17 January)
- Electric Six (17 January)
- The Flaming Lips (24 January)
- The Libertines (24 January)
- Jaimeson (24 January)
- Panjabi MC (24 January)
- Charlotte Church (31 January)
- Audioslave (31 January)
- Syntax (7 February)
- 3rd Edge (7 February)
- Cam’ron with Juelz Santana (7 February)
- Kelly Rowland (7 February)
- Sean Paul (14 February)
- The Kumars (14 February)
- Good Charlotte (14 February)
- Counting Crows (14 February)
- Sinead Quinn (21 February)
- Kira (28 February)
- Ainslie Henderson (7 March)
- Junior Senior (7 March)
- Röyksopp (7 March)
- Nelly (7 March)
- Stone Sour (14 March)
- Norah Jones (14 March)
- OK Go (21 March)
- The Thrills (21 March)
- Delta Goodrem (21 March)
- Richard X (28 March)
- Room 5 with Oliver Cheatham (4 April)
- Mario (11 April)
- Kym Marsh (18 April)
- D-Side (25 April)
- Goldfrapp (25 April)
- t.A.T.u. (2 May)
- Triple 8 (2 May)
- Lisa Maffia (2 May)
- Tomcraft (9 May)
- Bhangra Knights (16 May)
- The Androids (16 May)
- Lisa Scott-Lee (23 May)
- Mr Redz with DJ Scribble (23 May)
- Jemini (23 May)
- Marilyn Manson (13 June)
- Evanescence (13 June)
- Tommi (23 June)
- Jennifer Ellison (27 June)
- Fast Food Rockers (27 June)
- Wayne Wonder (27 June)
- The Darkness (27 June)
- Yeah Yeah Yeahs (4 July)
- Javine (18 July)
- The Murderdolls (25 July)
- Benny Benassi (25 July)
- The All-American Rejects (1 August)
- Lumidee (8 August)
- Ultrabeat (15 August)
- Jason Nevins (15 August)
- Rachel Stevens (22 August)
- Black Rebel Motorcycle Club (29 August)
- Lemar (29 August)
- Kelly Clarkson (5 September)
- Speedway (5 September)
- Melanie Blatt (5 September)
- Lee Cabrera (5 September)
- Black Eyed Peas (12 September)
- Rishi Rich Project with Jay Sean (19 September)
- Alex Parks (26 September)
- Clea (3 October)
- Hope of the States (10 October)
- 50 Cent (17 October)
- Chingy (24 October)
- Kevin Lyttle (24 October)
- Mark Ronson (31 October)
- Obie Trice (31 October)
- Stacie Orrico (31 October)
- Fatman Scoop and Crooklyn Clan (31 October)
- Phixx (7 November)
- Angel City (7 November)
- Shane Richie (7 November)
- Matt Goss (14 November)
- Outkast (14 November)
- Dizzee Rascal (21 November)
- Linus Loves (21 November)
- The Idols (12 December)
- Michael Andrews with Gary Jules (19 December)
- Michelle McManus (25 December)

== 2004 ==
- Alistair Griffin (9 January)
- Sam & Mark (9 January)
- Maroon 5 (16 January)
- Motorcycle (16 January)
- Franz Ferdinand (23 January)
- 2Play (23 January)
- Scissor Sisters (30 January)
- Snow Patrol (6 February)
- LMC (6 February)
- Keane (27 February)
- Raghav (27 February)
- VS (5 March)
- DJ Casper (12 March)
- Fya (12 March)
- G-Unit (19 March)
- Fountains of Wayne (19 March)
- J.C. Chasez (2 April)
- Natasha Bedingfield (9 April)
- McFly (9 April)
- Special D (16 April)
- The Rasmus (16 April)
- Alex Cartañá (16 April)
- Eamon (16 April)
- Wolfman with Pete Doherty (23 April)
- James Fox (30 April)
- Boogie Pimps (7 May)
- Kurt Nilsen (14 May)
- ATL (14 May)
- Beastie Boys (21 May)
- Sarah Connor (21 May)
- Frankee (21 May)
- The 411 (28 May)
- Hoobastank (28 May)
- The Killers (4 June)
- Mario Winans (4 June)
- Kristian Leontiou (4 June)
- 442 (18 June)
- Kanye West (18 June)
- Razorlight (25 June)
- Nina Sky (9 July)
- Shaznay Lewis (16 July)
- The Shapeshifters (23 July)
- Estelle (30 July)
- Lloyd Banks (6 August)
- Kane (13 August)
- Ana Johnsson (13 August)
- V (20 August)
- Kasabian (20 August)
- Shifty (20 August)
- 3 of a Kind (20 August)
- Rooster (27 August)
- Stonebridge (27 August)
- The 411 (3 September)
- JoJo (10 September)
- The Pirates (10 September)
- Ashlee Simpson (17 September)
- Minnie Driver (17 September)
- Brian McFadden (17 September)
- Joss Stone (24 September)
- Lucie Silvas (15 October)
- Duncan James and Keedie (22 October)
- Gwen Stefani (5 November)
- Michael Gray (12 November)
- Uniting Nations (3 December)
- Babyshambles (10 December)
- Steve Brookstein (17 December)

== 2005 ==
- Lovefreekz (14 January)
- Cast of Jailhouse Rock - The Musical (21 January)
- Athlete (28 January)
- Ciara with Petey Pablo (28 January)
- Pharrell Williams (11 February)
- Mario (18 February)
- G4 (18 February)
- The Game (25 February)
- Kaiser Chiefs (4 March)
- Phantom Planet (4 March)
- Akon (4 March)
- The Bravery (11 March)
- Cabin Crew (11 March)
- Sunset Strippers (18 March)
- Tyler James (18 March)
- Jem (25 March)
- The Faders (1 April)
- Studio B (10 April)
- Bodyrockers (15 April)
- The Caesars (22 April)
- Freeloaders (22 April)
- Amerie (13 May)
- Maxïmo Park (13 May)
- Max Graham (27 May)
- Rob Thomas (27 May)
- John Legend (3 June)
- Bobby Valentino (10 June)
- James Blunt (10 June)
- Funeral for a Friend (10 June)
- Lee Ryan (24 June)
- MVP (1 July)
- Hard-Fi (1 July)
- Inaya Day (8 July)
- Kanye West (11 July)
- Hayseed Dixie (17 July)
- Daddy Yankee (24 July)
- Daniel Powter (24 July)
- El Presidente (31 July)
- Simon Webbe (31 July)
- Madeleine Peyroux (7 August)
- K.T. Tunstall (15 August)
- Rihanna (28 August)
- Jamie Cullum (4 September)
- The Ordinary Boys (4 September)
- Pussycat Dolls (4 September)
- Arcade Fire (11 September)
- V V Brown (18 September)
- The Dead 60's (18 September)
- Damian Marley (25 September)
- Son of Dork (2 October)
- Katie Melua (9 October)
- Stephen Fretwell (9 October)
- Morning Runner (30 October)
- Il Divo (6 November)
- Kubb (13 November)
- The Subways (11 December)
- Nizlopi (11 December)
- The Choirboys (18 December)
- Shayne Ward (25 December)

== 2006 ==
- Liz McClarnon (8 January)
- José Gonzáles (8 January)
- Editors (8 January)
- The Kooks (16 January)
- The Go! Team (22 January)
- Belle & Sebastian (22 January)
- Hi-Tack (22 January)
- Fall Out Boy (29 January)
- The Magic Numbers (29 January)
- Chris Brown (5 February)
- Corinne Bailey-Rae (5 February)
- Graham Coxon (5 February)
- Beth Orton (5 February)
- Orson (5 February)
- The Automatic (13 February)
- The Mystery Jets (20 February)
- Boy Kill Boy (20 February)
- Delays (27 February)
- The Feeling (6 March)
- Chico (6 March)
- The Zutons (13 March)
- Secret Machines (19 March)
- Journey South (26 March)
- Mattafix (26 March)
- Ne-Yo (26 March)
- Nerina Pallot (2 April)
- Andy Abraham (2 April)
- The Crimea (9 April)
- Gnarls Barkley (16 April)
- Jamie Foxx (23 April)
- Him (23 April)
- Chicane (30 April)
- Dirty Pretty Things (30 April)
- The Futureheads (30 April)
- Matt Willis (7 May)
- Infernal (7 May)
- Vittorio (7 May)
- Daz Sampson (7 May)
- Sunblock (21 May)
- Breaks Co-Op (21 May)
- Sandi Thom (28 May)
- Lily Allen (11 June)
- The Goo Goo Dolls (11 June)
- Ne-Yo (18 June)
- Guillemots (18 June)
- Ray Lamontagne (18 June)
- The Fratellis (18 June)
- Wolfmother (25 June)
- Paolo Nutini (2 July)
- James Dean Bradfield (16 July)
- James Morrison (16 July)
- Rogue Traders (16 July)
- Alesha Dixon (23 July)
- Leona Lewis (25 December)

== 2007 ==
- Kate Nash (25 December)
- Just Jack (25 December)
- The Hoosiers (25 December)
- The Pigeon Detectives (25 December)

== 2008 ==
- Duffy (25 December)
- Sam Sparro (25 December)
- Calvin Harris (25 December)
- Geraldine (25 December)
- Adele (25 December)
- Cast of Mamma Mia (25 December)
- Alexandra Burke (25 December)
- Gabriella Cilmi (31 December)
- Sam Sparro (31 December)

== 2009 ==
- The Saturdays (25 December)
- La Roux (25 December)
- JLS (25 December)
- Florence and the Machine (25 December)
- Diversity (25 December)
- Tinchy Stryder (31 December)
- Joe McElderry (31 December)

== 2010 ==
- Cee Lo Green (25 December)
- Ellie Goulding (25 December)
- Jason Derulo (25 December)
- Olly Murs (25 December)
- Eliza Doolittle (25 December)
- Scouting for Girls (25 December)
- Tinie Tempah (25 December)
- Plan B (25 December)

== 2011 ==
- Example (25 December)
- Professor Green with Emeli Sandé (25 December)
- Rizzle Kicks (25 December)
- Ed Sheeran (25 December)
- The Wanted (25 December)
- Jessie J (25 December)
- Noah and the Whale (25 December)
- Pixie Lott (25 December)
- The Vaccines (25 December)
- Little Mix (25 December)

== 2012 ==
- Carly Rae Jepsen (25 December)
- Conor Maynard (25 December)
- Paloma Faith (25 December)
- Sam & The Womp (25 December)
- Rita Ora (25 December)
- Rudimental with John Newman (25 December)
- Gabrielle Aplin (25 December)
- James Arthur (25 December)
- The Script (31 December)
- Tulisa (31 December)
- The Maccabees (31 December)
- Arlissa (31 December)

== 2013 ==
- Chase & Status (25 December)
- Tom Odell (25 December)
- Naughty Boy with Sam Smith (25 December)
- Ella Eyre (25 December)
- OneRepublic (25 December)
- John Martin (31 December)
- The Vamps (31 December)
- The 1975 (31 December)
- London Grammar (31 December)
- Jacob Banks (31 December)

== 2014 ==
- Take That (31 December)
- Gorgon City with MNEK (25 December)
- Sigma (25 December)
- The Vamps (25 December)
- Tom Odell (25 December)
- McBusted (25 December)
- Rixton (25 December)
- Mr Probz (25 December)
- George Ezra (25 December)
- Ella Henderson (25 December)
- Ed Sheeran (25 December)
- Clean Bandit with Jess Glynne (25 December)
- Ed Sheeran (31 December)
- Jess Glynne (31 December)
- The Vamps (31 December)
- Professor Green with Tori Kelly (31 December)
- La Roux (31 December)
- George Ezra (31 December)
- Ella Henderson (31 December)
- Labrinth (31 December)
- Charli XCX (31 December)
- The Script (31 December)
- Clean Bandit with Jess Glynne (31 December)

== 2015 ==
- Fleur East (25 December)
- Lunchmoney Lewis (25 December)
- Sigma & Rita Ora (25 December)
- Hozier (25 December)
- Years & Years (25 December)
- Jamie Lawson (25 December)
- James Bay (25 December)
- Nick Jonas (25 December)
- Omi (25 December)
- Ellie Goulding (25 December)
- Coldplay (25 December)
- Jess Glynne (25 December)

== 2016 ==
- KDA with Tinie Tempah & Katy B (1 January)
- The Vamps (1 January)
- Grace with G-Eazy (1 January)
- The Vaccines (1 January)
- WSTRN (1 January)
- James Bay (1 January)
- Ellie Goulding (1 January)
- Lost Frequencies (1 January)
- The Maccabees (1 January)
- Sigala (1 January)
- Jess Glynne (1 January)
- Years & Years (1 January)
- Louisa Johnson (25 December)
- DNCE (25 December)
- Kungs with Cookin' on 3 Burners (25 December)
- Calum Scott (25 December)
- Skepta (25 December)
- Jonas Blue with Dakota (25 December)
- Craig David (25 December)
- Christine and the Queens (25 December)
- Olly Murs (25 December)
- Zara Larsson (25 December)
- James Arthur (25 December)
- Clean Bandit with Anne-Marie (25 December)
- Anne-Marie (31 December)
- Kideko with George Kwali, Nadia Rose & Sweetie Irie (31 December)
- Tom Odell (31 December)
- Dua Lipa (31 December)
- Blossoms (31 December)
- Craig David (31 December)
- Alan Walker with Tove Styrke (31 December)
- Zara Larsson (31 December)
- Nathan Sykes (31 December)
- Jonas Blue with JP Cooper (31 December)
- Shawn Mendes (31 December)
- Clean Bandit with Louisa Johnson (31 December)

== 2017 ==
- Ed Sheeran (25 December)
- Anne-Marie (25 December)
- The Script (25 December)
- Jax Jones with Raye (25 December)
- Jonas Blue with William Singe (25 December)
- JP Cooper (25 December)
- Camila (25 December)
- Stormzy (25 December)
- Clean Bandit (25 December)
- Dua Lipa (25 December)
- James Arthur (25 December)
- Rita Ora (25 December)
- Ed Sheeran (25 & 31 December)
- Anne-Marie (31 December)
- Sigala with Ella Eyre (31 December)
- Starley (31 December)
- The Vamps (31 December)
- Mabel with Kojo Funds (31 December)
- Paloma Faith (31 December)
- Clean Bandit (31 December)
- Yungen with Yxng Bane (31 December)
- Rita Ora (31 December)
- Craig David with Bastille (31 December)
- Dua Lipa (31 December)
- Ed Sheeran (31 December)

== 2018 ==
- Kirsten Joy (25 December)
- Freya Ridings (25 December)
- Camille (25 December)
- Liam Payne & Lennon Stella (25 December)
- Dan Caplen (25 December)
- Sigrid (25 December)
- Tom Walker (25 December)
- Keala Settle (25 December)
- LadBaby (25 December)
- B Young (29 December)
- Jack & Jack (29 December)
- Lewis Capaldi (29 December)
- Tom Grennan (29 December)
- Rae Morris (29 December)

== 2019 ==
- Jack Savoretti (25 December)
- Becky Hill (25 December)
- Dermot Kennedy (25 December)
- Joel Corry & Hayley May (25 December)
- AJ Tracey & Jorja Smith (25 December)
- Regard (30 December)
- Celeste Waite (30 December)
- Lily Moore (30 December)

== 2020 ==
- Harry Styles (25 December)
- 24kGoldn (25 December)
- Miley Cyrus (25 December)
- Aitch (25 December)
- KSI (25 December)
- Digital Farm Animals (25 December)
- Yungblud (31 December)
- Wes Nelson and Hardy Caprio (31 December)
- Arlo Parks (31 December)
- Nathan Dawe (31 December)
- Michael Kiwanuka (31 December)
- Alfie Templeman (31 December)

== 2021 ==
- Griff (25 December)
- Mimi Webb (25 December)
- ArrDee (31 December)
- Lola Young (31 December)
- Mahalia (31 December)
- Sam Fender (31 December)

== 2022 ==
- Cat Burns (24 December)

== See also ==
- List of performances on Top of the Pops
- Top of the Pops 2
