= Coeducation at Dartmouth =

Coeducation in Dartmouth College in Hanover, New Hampshire, began in 1972 when Dartmouth College president John G. Kemeny installed a year-round program ensuring women's admission to the college. Kemeny's action created significant controversy among alumni and male students.

== Beginning admission and Kemeny's Year-Round Plan ==
Coeducation at Dartmouth began with the addition of a fourth term in the summer of the 1971-1972 academic year. Women were allowed to take classes during the summer term that would count for degrees in their own schools. In 1971, the Kemeny started a committee in which women would be included in a year-round plan.

In 1972, the Dartmouth board of trustees approved the admission of women for year-round operation of campus. Complete coeducation started that same year.

== Resistance to coeducation ==
Though many male students favored coeducation, a significant number of them resisted it.

Male students frequently slurred the Dartmouth women by calling them “co-hogs.” This insult, derived from the words coed and quahog, was a derogatory reference to female genitalia. In 1975, the song “Our Cohogs” won a competition judged by dean Carroll W. Brewster. The song consisted of vulgar references to Dartmouth women to the tune of “This Old Man.”

Dartmouth received several letters that referred to Dartmouth women as “the enemy” and sexual objects. A 1973 letter listed four demands. The first demand was that women's upper torsos must remain naked in the dining hall. The second demand was that the women's “services be available at all times,” implying that the women would have sex with male students. The third demand was that the

“co-hog softball team must also play naked in the green. Women with large floppy tits may wear bras. The brush area must remain uncovered.”

The final demand in the letter was that a Dartmouth woman perform oral sex on the Dartmouth president to remove his so-called “faggy” tendencies.

The Dartmouth women were also subjected to violence and open criticism. Butterfield Hall, a mixed sex dorm at the college, was frequently vandalized. Its residents endured frequent harassment by screaming drunken men.

It was widely believed that these attacks on Dartmouth women were meant to isolate them and reestablish traditional gender roles at the college. This isolation of the women would allow male students, particularly fraternity members, to assert their dominance.

As of 2015, women's admission to Dartmouth is around 50% percent.
