= Santa Claus & The Christmas Trees =

British novelty band

Santa Claus & the Christmas Trees
- Genres: Novelty/pub rock
- Years active: 1982–83
- Label: Polydor Records

Santa Claus and the Christmas Trees was a novelty band created by Polydor Records in 1982.

== History ==
In 1981, a Stiff Records novelty band, The Snowmen, had a Christmas hit single. For the following year, Polydor A&R agent and occasional producer, Dennis Munday, whose main work was promoting post-punk groups such as The Jam, put together a bunch of session musicians to record a similar 45, this time as a medley of traditional Christmas songs in a pub singalong style. The song reached the top 20, and the musicians appeared on Top of the Pops on 16 December 1982. The band also recorded an X-rated version of the medley, under the same catalogue number (IVY 1), and with the same b-side, but with no identification on the sleeve or label.

Polydor also commissioned the same musicians to produce a single for Valentine's Day in 1983, a medley of love songs under the name Valentino and the Valentines; it was not a hit. Undaunted, Polydor released a second Christmas medley, also accompanied by an X-rated version, at the end of the year, and it also made the top 40, but there were no further releases from the concept.

== Discography ==
=== Singles ===
Year	Song	UK	RoI
1982	"Singalong-A-Santa (Medley)"	19	30
1983	"Singalong-A-Cupid (Medley)"	–	–
1983	"Singalong-A-Santa (Again)"	39	–
"—" denotes releases that did not chart.
