= Together We Are Beautiful =

Single by Fern Kinney
- B-side: "Baby, Let Me Kiss You"
- Released: 1980
- Label: WEA
- Songwriter: Ken Leray
- Producers: Carson Whitsett; Wolf Stephenson; Tommy Couch

"Together We Are Beautiful" is a popular song by Fern Kinney. Written by Ken Leray and produced by Carson Whitsett, Wolf Stephenson and Tommy Couch, "Together We Are Beautiful" was originally recorded by Ken Leray in 1977, while a 1979 version by Steve Allan peaked at number 67 in the UK Singles Chart. Kinney's version was originally a B-side to "Baby, Let Me Kiss You", but the song was flipped after DJs picked up on it. The song made number one on the UK Singles Chart for one week in March 1980.

== Charts ==
=== Weekly charts ===
Weekly chart performance for "Together We Are Beautiful"
Chart (1980)	Peak position
Australia (Kent Music Report)	20
Belgium (Ultratop 50 Flanders)	13
Ireland (IRMA)	2
New Zealand (Recorded Music NZ)	23
Netherlands (Dutch Top 40)	24
Netherlands (Single Top 100)	28
South Africa (Springbok Radio)	5
UK Singles (OCC)	1

=== Year-end charts ===
Year-end chart performance for "Together We Are Beautiful"
Chart (1980)	Position
Australia (Kent Music Report)	95
