= The Ramblers (choir) =

English children's choir

- Origin: Gorton, Greater Manchester, England
- Genres: Folk/pop
- Years active: 1978–1983
- Past members: Lisa Wray; Melanie Jerram; Helen Hughes

The Ramblers was a choir of children from Abbey Hey Junior School from Gorton in Manchester, whose single entitled "The Sparrow" was a top 20 hit at Christmas in 1979.

== Career ==
The choir had adopted the name The Ramblers for a concert at the Royal Northern College of Music in 1978, and one of the songs, "The Sparrow", written by teacher Maurice Jordan, was so popular that the parent-teachers' association paid for the choir to record it at the Strawberry Studios in Stockport, along with four other folk songs; originally 500 copies were pressed up for sale at the school. Jordan had written the song six years before when a student at Millgate College of Education for his show The Transmogrification of Samuel Sparrow.

The single was picked up by Decca Records and re-recorded under the production of Kevin Parrott, of Brian and Michael fame, with another Jordan composition on the b-side. 11-year-old Lisa Wray took the lead vocal part, while the other members were 9- and 10-year-olds; one of them, Melanie Jerram, choreographed the choir's movements for the song.

The song was released on 21 September 1979 and entered the charts for the week ending 13 October 1979. Two weeks later, it entered the top 30, and was number 1 in the Radio Luxembourg chart; in imitation, a nearby school's choir, St Winifred's School Choir, recorded a single - "Bread And Fishes" - for Music For Pleasure, but it vanished without trace.

The choir appeared on a number of programmes, including Pebble Mill at One, Top of the Pops, Crackerjack, 3-2-1, and Tiswas; although around 50-70 performed on each recording, usually around 20 appeared on television.

At the start of December Decca issued a 12-track album, also called The Sparrow. The single peaked at no. 11 in the 24 November 1979 chart and earned the choir a silver disc, presented during their 3-2-1 appearance. It also earned enough money for the school to buy a minibus, a garage, and brass instruments.

The choir released five more singles until 1983, but never made the charts again. "The Sparrow" had an unexpected afterlife, being adapted by football supporters as an insult to rival teams.

== See also ==
- List of performers on Top of the Pops
- Claire and Friends, another children's act linked with Kevin Parrott
