= Fern Kinney =

American singer (born 1949)

- Born: July 11, 1949 (age 76); Jackson, Mississippi, U.S.
- Genres: R&B, disco
- Occupation: Singer

Fern Kinney (born Fern Kinney-Lewis, July 11, 1949) is an American R&B and disco singer, who is best remembered for her releases, "Groove Me" and "Together We Are Beautiful".

== Career ==
Born in Jackson, Mississippi, United States, Kinney originally sang in The Poppies with Dorothy Moore.

In the early 1970s, she began working as a session musician and backing vocalist. Among the songs she sang on were King Floyd's "Groove Me", and her former "Poppie" bandmate Dorothy Moore's 1976 Top 10 single, "Misty Blue".

By 1979, then having settled as a housewife, Kinney decided to attempt a comeback, and she recorded her own version of "Groove Me", but changed the rhythm on the song to turn it into a disco dance track. The song reached number 6 on the Billboard dance chart. Her next single "Together We Are Beautiful", released in 1980 was another disco song, but with a slower and more sultry beat. It had been recorded by the British vocalist, Steve Allan, eighteen months earlier. Kinney's effort failed to chart in the United States, but reached number one in the UK Singles Chart.

Kinney's subsequent releases attempted to continue in the disco style, however by this time the disco fad had passed its peak and Kinney was unable to repeat her success. By 1983, she had returned to her earlier career as a backing vocalist. In 1994, Music Club released an album (MCCD 167) of Kinney's records called Chemistry The Best Of under licence from Malaco Records, which contained 17 tracks.

== Discography ==
=== Studio albums ===
- Groove Me (1979)
- Fern (1981)
- Sweet Music (1982)

=== Compilation albums ===
- Fern Kinney (1988)
- Chemistry – The Best of Fern Kinney (1994)

=== Singles ===
Year	Title	Peak chart positions					Certifications
Year	Title	US Pop	US R&B	US Dance	AUS	UK	Certifications
1968	"Your Love’s Not Reliable"	—	—	—	—	—	
1978	"Sweet Life / Tonight's the Night" (with Frederick Knight)	—	—	—	—	—	
1979	"Baby Let Me Kiss You"	—	—	—	—	—	
1979	"I've Been Lonely for So Long"	—	—	—	—	—	
1979	"I Want You Back"	—	—	—	—	—	
1979	"Groove Me"	54	26	6	94	—	
1979	"Together We Are Beautiful"	—	—	—	20	1	BPI: Gold
1981	"Let the Good Times Roll"	—	—	30	—	—	
1982	"I'm Ready for Your Love / Boogie Box"	—	—	—	—	—	
1983	"Beautiful Love Song"	—	—	—	—	141	
"—" denotes releases that did not chart or were not released.

== See also ==
- List of artists who reached number one on the UK Singles Chart
- List of disco artists (F-K)
- List of number-one singles from the 1980s (UK)
- List of one-hit wonders on the UK Singles Chart
- List of performers on Top of the Pops
- List of people from Mississippi
