= This Old Man =

Children's song and nursery rhyme

Nursery rhyme
- Songwriter: Traditional

"This Old Man" is an English-language children's song, counting exercise, folk song, and nursery rhyme with a Roud Folk Song Index number of 3550.

== Origins and history ==
The origins of this song are obscure and very old. There is a version noted in Anne Gilchrist's Journal of the English Folk Dance and Song Society (1937), learned from her Welsh nurse in the 1870s under the title "Jack Jintle".

== Variations ==
A typical verse from a standard version of the rhyme is:

This old man, he played one,
He played knick-knack on my thumb (or drum).
With a knick-knack paddywhack,
Give a dog a bone.
This old man came rolling home.

Subsequent verses follow this pattern, rhyming the continually increasing numbers with other items, such as "two" with "my shoe", "three" with "my knee", "four" with "my door", and so on.

Common modern versions include:

- One: My thumb/my drum
- Two: My shoe
- Three: My knee
- Four: My door
- Five: My hive
- Six: My sticks
- Seven: Up in Heaven (or up to Heaven)
- Eight: My gate
- Nine: My spine/my line/my vine
- Ten: Once again (or "Over again")/on my pen/on my hen

Nicholas Monsarrat (1910–1979), in his autobiography Life Is a Four Letter Word, refers to the song as being "a Liverpool song", adding that it was "local and original" during his childhood in Liverpool. A similar version was included in Cecil Sharp and Sabine Baring-Gould's English Folk-Songs for Schools, published in 1906. It was collected several times in England in the early 20th century with a variety of lyrics. In 1948 it was included by Pete Seeger and Ruth Crawford in their American Folk Songs for Children and recorded by Seeger in 1953.

It received a boost in popularity when it was adapted for the film The Inn of the Sixth Happiness (1958) by composer Malcolm Arnold as "The Children's Marching Song", which led to hit singles for Cyril Stapleton and Mitch Miller, both versions making the Top 40. A rock and roll arrangement was recorded by Ritchie Valens as "The Paddi-Wack Song" in 1958, released 1959. A later version by The Snowmen, under the name "Nik Nak Paddy Wak", was also a minor hit in the UK singles charts in 1986.

== In popular culture ==
The public domain melody of the song was borrowed for "I Love You", a song used as the theme for the children's television program Barney and Friends. New lyrics were written for the melody in 1982 by Indiana homemaker Lee Bernstein for a children's book titled "Piggyback Songs" (1983), and these lyrics were adapted by the television series in the early 1990s, without knowing they had been written by Bernstein. Upon discovering the usage of her lyrics, Bernstein retained lawyer Daniel Glavin who negotiated with the Barney producers for writing credit and royalties, reported as a one-time payment of $7,500 plus $2,000 "every several years." In 1994 when Barney-related licensing was bringing in an estimated $50 million for the Lyons Group in Texas, Bernstein sought a higher royalty payment in court.

The titular character of Columbo would often whistle this tune whenever he felt he was close to solving a case.
