= Honky (band) =

British funk band

- Origin: Southampton, Hampshire
- Genres: Funk, disco
- Years active: 1974–79
- Label: Creole Records

Honky was a British disco/funk band which scored a UK singles chart hit in 1977.

== History ==
The group was formed in Southampton in 1974 by bassist Cliff Barks; by mid-1976, having gone through 15 different musicians, the band reached a stable line-up of Barks, vocalist Ray Othen, drummer Bob White, guitarist Trevor "TC" Cummins, and saxophonists Ron Taylor, Clark Newton, and Malcolm Baggott.

Honky was signed to Creole Records in 1977, and released two singles, "Join The Party" (written by Cummins) and "Give All You Got" (written by Othen), and an eponymous album; only "Join The Party" was a hit, reaching number 28 in the charts in June 1977. It also reached number 9 in the Record Mirror disco charts, and this minor success earned the band a place on Top Of The Pops.

Ray Othen died on 3 April 2016, aged 59.
