= Terri Wells =

American pop singer

- Born: Philadelphia, Pennsylvania
- Genres: Funk; Philly soul; R&B; Dance
- Occupations: Singer; Songwriter
- Years active: 1975–present
- Labels: Philadelphia; Philly World
- Formerly of: City Limits

Terri Wells is an American soul singer.

== Career ==
Wells started out in 1975 as a singer with the Philadelphia group, City Limits, which recorded one single and one album. She was then recruited as a session singer for Philadelphia International Records.

In 1983, producer Nick Martinelli suggested she be signed to the Philly World label as a solo artist, and her debut single, "You Make It Heaven", was a minor hit in the United Kingdom. The follow-up, a cover of The Detroit Spinners' track "I'll Be Around", reached the top 20 in Britain, and she performed the song on Top of the Pops.

Following this success, she recorded an album, Just Like Dreamin', but it missed the charts, and none of her three follow-up singles (on which she was a co-writer) charted on the main listings.

== Albums ==
- Just Like Dreamin' (1984)

== Singles ==
Year	Title	Peak chart positions	
Year	Title	US R&B	UK
1983	"You Make It Heaven"	—	53
1984	"I'll Be Around"	81	17
1984	"Just Like Dreamin'"	–	–
1984	"I'm Givin' All My Love"	66	–
1984	"I Already Know"	–	–
"—" denotes releases that did not chart or were not released.
