= The Children of Tansley School =

- Origin: Gorton, Greater Manchester, England
- Genres: Pop
- Years active: 1981

The Children of Tansley School was a school choir from the village of Tansley in Derbyshire.

== History ==
After songwriter Gordon Lorenz had the 1980 Christmas number one with the St Winifred's School Choir recording of his song "There's No One Quite Like Grandma", he wrote a follow-up single - "My Mum Is One In A Million" - to be released to commemorate Mothering Sunday on 29 March in 1981. However, as the teachers at St Winifred's School thought it too cynical even for them, Lorenz, who was living in Dethick at the time, handed it over to a nearby primary school, and EMI agreed to release the recording.

The single came out in February 1981, in a cheap paper bag sleeve, and in its second week on the UK singles charts rose from number 75 to number 27, for the week ending 4 April 1981. The single was helped in part by a competition in the Sunday Mirror, for which one of the prizes was a platinum disc of the single.

The chart performance earned the children a spot on Top of the Pops on 2 April 1981, but, with Mothering Sunday now past, the song plummeted the following week out of the top 40, never to return.

A follow-up single and album, "Our Family" and Our Family Album, both were unsuccessful, ending the choir's recording career.
