= J.A.L.N. Band =

British dance band

- Origin: Birmingham, United Kingdom
- Genres: Reggae; Disco; Funk
- Years active: 1975–88
- Labels: Magnet Records
- Past members: Roy Gee Hemmings; Charlie Sylvester; Sam Fortune; Ronnie John; Alan Holmes; Laurie Browns; Rob Goodale; Tony Williams; Mike Magesty; Yolanda Parinchey; Susie Birchall

J.A.L.N. Band was a British band originally consisting of Roy Gee Hemmings (vocals), Charlie Sylvester (guitar), Sam Fortune (vocals, keyboards, percussion), and Ronnie John (drums).

== Overview ==
The band, whose members were from Bordesley Green and Erdington in Birmingham, was originally called Superbad, playing a hard funk style which gained critical acclaim but no commercial success; the band therefore added a disco beat, and changed its name to J.A.L.N. Band. J.A.L.N. stood for Just Another Lonely Night, the title of one of the band's songs.

The band's debut single - a cover of the Fatback Band track "Street Dance" - did not chart, and nor did its second, the title suggested by the record label and the song written by Hemmings. The band's third single, "Disco Music - I Like It", made the top 30 of the UK Singles Chart in October 1976, boosted by it being the first 12-inch single on the Magnet label. As a result, the band appeared on Top Of The Pops, and the single later reached number 4 in the Australian charts.

Producer Pete Waterman suggested that the band record "Boogie Nights" as a follow-up, but the song went to Heatwave instead, and J.A.L.N. Band never had as big a hit single again. The band released three albums, the first of which - Life Is A Fight - was based around the concept of one half being hard funk and the other half being party music; for the album, the band recruited a new brass section, made up of Alan Holmes (formerly of Sounds Incorporated) (saxophone), Laurie Brown (trumpet), and Rob Goodale (trombone). The brass section was later replaced by Tex Flint (saxophone), Willis Sylvester (saxophone), and Steve Sylvester (bass, percussion). Despite being voted Best Disco Live Act in a Record Mirror poll in 1977, none of the band's albums charted.

The band changed its style in 1983, dropping the brass section, at which point only John, Fortune, and Charles Sylvester remained of its original line-up; in came lead singer Tony Williams, guitarist Mike Magesty, and backing vocalists Yolanda Parinchey and Susie Birchall. The only single recorded by this line-up, in 1988 on ZYX Records, did not chart.

Hemmings joined The Drifters in 1990 and was a member until 2004; Charlie Sylvester opened a studio in Lozells, out of which he ran the Eye To Eye record label.

== Discography ==
=== Albums ===
- Life Is A Fight, 1976
- Just Another Lonely Night, 1977
- Movin' City High, 1978

=== Singles ===
Year	Single	Peak chart positions		
Year	Single	UK	UK disco	AUS
1975	"Street Dance"	–	–	–
1976	"Life Is A Fight"	–	–	–
1976	"Disco Music - I Like It"	21	10	4
1977	Live (EP)	–	–	–
1977	"I Got To Sing"	47	21	–
1977	"Goin' Places"	–	19	–
1977	"So Good"	–	48	–
1978	"Get Up (And Let Yourself Go)"	53	25	–
1978	"Universal Love"	–	–	–
1978	"Mockin Bird Hill"	–	–	–
1988	"One Sweet Taste Of Love"	–	–	–
"—" denotes releases that did not chart or were not released in that territory.
