= Toxic Two =

British musical duo

- Origin: United States of America
- Genres: Rave
- Years active: 1991–92
- Labels: PWL
- Past members: Damon Wild; Ray Love

Toxic Two was an electronic music production duo of New York City DJs Damon Wilber and Ray Laurie, using the names Damon Wild and Ray Love, who had a UK top 20 hit single in 1992.

== History ==
The duo only produced two singles under the Toxic Two name, namely "Rave Generator" and "Chemical Reaction". "Rave Generator" - in essence, a bootleg remix of Frank de Wulf's track "Pure Pleasure" - entered the UK singles chart in March 1992, and rose to its peak at no. 13 in its third week on the charts. The duo performed the song on Top Of The Pops on 12 March 1992.
