= Conway Brothers =

American vocal and instrumental group

- Origin: Chicago, Illinois, U.S.
- Genres: Funk, soul
- Years active: 1982–1987
- Past members: Frederick Conway; Hiawatha Conway; Huston Conway; James Conway

The Conway Brothers were an American vocal and instrumental group from Chicago, Illinois, made up of brothers Frederick (keyboards), Hiawatha (drums), Huston (bass), and James (guitar). They are best known for their single "Turn It Up", which reached No. 11 on the UK Singles Chart in 1985.

== Discography ==
=== Albums ===
- Turn It Up! (1985)
- Lady in Red (1987)

=== Compilations ===
- Dance Club Hits Vol. 1 (1996)

=== Singles ===
Year	Title	Peak chart positions	
Year	Title	US R&B	UK
1982	"Set It Out"	—	—
1983	"Get Live / Over and Over Again"	—	—
1985	"Turn It Up"	81	11
1985	"Raise the Roof"	81	77
1987	"I Can't Fight It"	84	—
"—" denotes releases that did not chart or were not released.
