= The Truth (duo) =

British pop duo

- Genres: Pop music
- Years active: 1965–68
- Labels: Pye Records; Decca Records
- Past members: Steve Gold; Frank Aiello

The Truth was a British pop duo which had a UK hit single with a Beatles cover in 1966.

== Biography ==
The duo was made up of Londoners Steve Gold and Frank Aiello. Both worked in the haircutting industry - Gold as barber and Aiello as hairdresser - and they performed as a folk outfit until one of Gold's customers, songwriter Jeff Cooper, with whom Gold had been discussing music, suggested the pair record a demo, primarily to showcase Cooper's songs. The result impressed Pye Records so much that the company signed Cooper and the duo, which took on the name The Truth from Aiello's favourite Ray Charles song.

Their first single - the Cooper-penned "Baby Don't You Know", released in September 1965 - failed to chart, but the follow-up, a cover of the Beatles' album track "Girl", made all of the national charts in February 1966, peaking at 16 in the New Musical Express charts, 18 in both the Melody Maker and Disc and Music Echo charts, and 27 in the Record Retailer charts.

However the duo's only other chart action was when the follow-up single, a cover of Ray Davies' "I Go To Sleep", peaked at 38 in the Melody Maker listings in June 1966. The duo cleft to cover versions for their other singles releases, with Decca Records signing them before 1966 was out (originally for the Deram imprint). By 1969 the duo's run was over.

== Post-Truth ==
Aiello appeared in musicals and as vocalist for early heavy metal band The Beast, which soon changed its name to Bedlam. Bedlam's drummer was Cozy Powell, and Aiello remained with Powell in Cozy Powell's Hammer after Bedlam broke up, scoring a top ten hit with "Na Na Na".

Gold changed his nom de disque to Steve Jameson, and occasionally recorded under the name Nosmo King; in 1974, under the latter appellation, he recorded a single whose b-side - "Goodbye Nothing To Say" - caught on with the Northern Soul audience, resulting in label Pye re-issuing it under the fake group name of The Javells, and scoring a top 30 hit. In 1993 he pivoted to stand-up comedy, later creating the persona of mock-Borscht Belt survivor Sol Bernstein.
