= The Javells =

1970s group of session musicians

The Javells was the name given to a group of session musicians, backing singer/songwriter Nosmo King, which had a British hit single in 1974.

== Biography ==
The Javells' one hit single was the song "Goodbye Nothin' To Say", which was the b-side of a single, "Teenage Love", on Pye recorded by Nosmo King. It reached number 26 in the singles charts in late 1974.

King was the pseudonym of singer songwriter Steve Jameson, who had previously been one of the two members of sixties charters The Truth under the name Steve Gold, and who had previously recorded solo for Pye and Dawn. The name Nosmo King was a pun on a sign (No Smoking!) and had also been used a name also used by an entertainer of the 1930s), and Jameson was a co-writer of the song, along with regular songwriting partner Marshall Doctors.

After Northern Soul DJs flipped the single and it became a club success, Pye Records re-issued the single, this time with a sixties-sounding group name. Performers on the track included Tony Burrows and The Chanter Sisters. The later hit "Right Back Where We Started From" borrowed heavily from the single, and its songwriters had to settle out of court with the writers of "Goodbye Nothing To Say".
