= Startrax =

British disco band

- Genres: Disco
- Years active: 1981–82
- Labels: Picksy Records
- Past members: Alan Carvell

Startrax was a musical project created by Pickwick Records in 1981.

== History ==
Pickwick Records had used the Startrax name as a sub-label since 1976 for budget compilation albums. In 1981, with a craze for medley recordings making the British singles chart, Pickwick used the Startrax name for session musicians recording medleys for release on the label; as Pickwick had no track history of releasing singles, the sub-label Picksy was created, and a logo similar to that on the Stars On 45 releases was used.

The first release, "Startrax Club Disco", was a medley of covers of songs by the Bee Gees, topped and tailed by a sting written by producer Bruce Baxter, who had produced many of the Hallmark Records Top of the Pops cover albums. The singer was Alan Carvell, who had had minor hits (under the name Steve Allan) as part of The Carvells and with a solo version of "Together We Are Beautiful", and who laid down all the vocal tracks. The popularity of medleys at the time was such that, when the recording entered the top 30 in the UK charts, there were 7 medleys in the top 30. Ultimately Startrax peaked at no. 18 and Carvell appeared with other session musicians on Top of the Pops.

An album featuring more Bee Gee tracks followed, which made the top 30 of the album charts. The follow-up was a reggae medley single and album set (which also began and ended with the Startrax theme), but neither made the charts.

== Discography ==
=== Albums ===
Year	Album	UK
1981	Startrax Club Disco	26
1981	Reggae's Greatest Hits	–

=== Singles ===
Year	Song	UK
1981	"Startrax Club Disco"	18
1981	"Reggae's Greatest Hits"	—
"—" denotes releases that did not chart.
