= The Snowmen (band) =

British disco band

- Genres: Novelty/children
- Years active: 1981–87
- Label: Stiff Records
- Past members: Martin Kershaw; Nick Portlock; Jonathan Miller; Bob Butterworth

The Snowmen was a novelty band created by Stiff Records in 1981.

== History ==
In 1981, Ian Dury left Stiff for Polydor Records. As a cash-in for the Christmas market, Stiff commissioned session musicians to record a version of the Hokey Cokey with a Dury-soundalike vocal from Martin Kershaw. The other musicians on the recording were Nick Portlock, Jonathan Miller, and Bob Butterworth.

Martin Kershaw was the lead singer of the band, who performed in a singing voice similar to Ian Dury. His other credits included guitar on "Kung Fu Fighting" and "Dance Yourself Dizzy", and playing banjo on 120 episodes of the Muppet Show. Kershaw was born in Shipley, West Yorkshire on 13 July 1944 and died on 23 October 2020.

Stiff enigmatically refused to confirm the identity of the genuine vocalist, leading to speculation that it actually was Dury. For more implausible deniability, Stiff created an antonymous sub-label, called Slack, with a logo based on a pile of nutty slack, on which to release the single; Kershaw and Portlock co-wrote the b-side.

The recording reached the top 20 of the UK and Irish singles charts. Stiff press officer Nigel Dick, with other staff from the Stiff offices, donned snowman costumes for a video (shot in Brimpton, Berkshire) and appearance on the 17 December 1981 edition of Top of the Pops.

Kershaw re-emerged with a medley single in 1982, this time on Kershaw's own Solid Records label. The Snowmen's final single came in 1986, with a version of the nursery rhyme This Old Man, by which time Dury himself was claiming to be involved, saying he "did it as a joke".

== Discography ==
=== Albums ===
Year	Album	UK
1981	Hokey Cokey Party: The Album	–

=== Singles ===
Year	Song	UK	RoI
1981	"The Hokey Cokey"	18	17
1982	"Xmas Party"	44	–
1986	"Nik Nak Paddy Wak"	80	–
"—" denotes releases that did not chart.
