= Shakatak discography =

- Studio albums: 33
- Live albums: 7
- Compilation albums: 31
- Singles: 44
- Video albums: 6
- Repackaged sets: 11

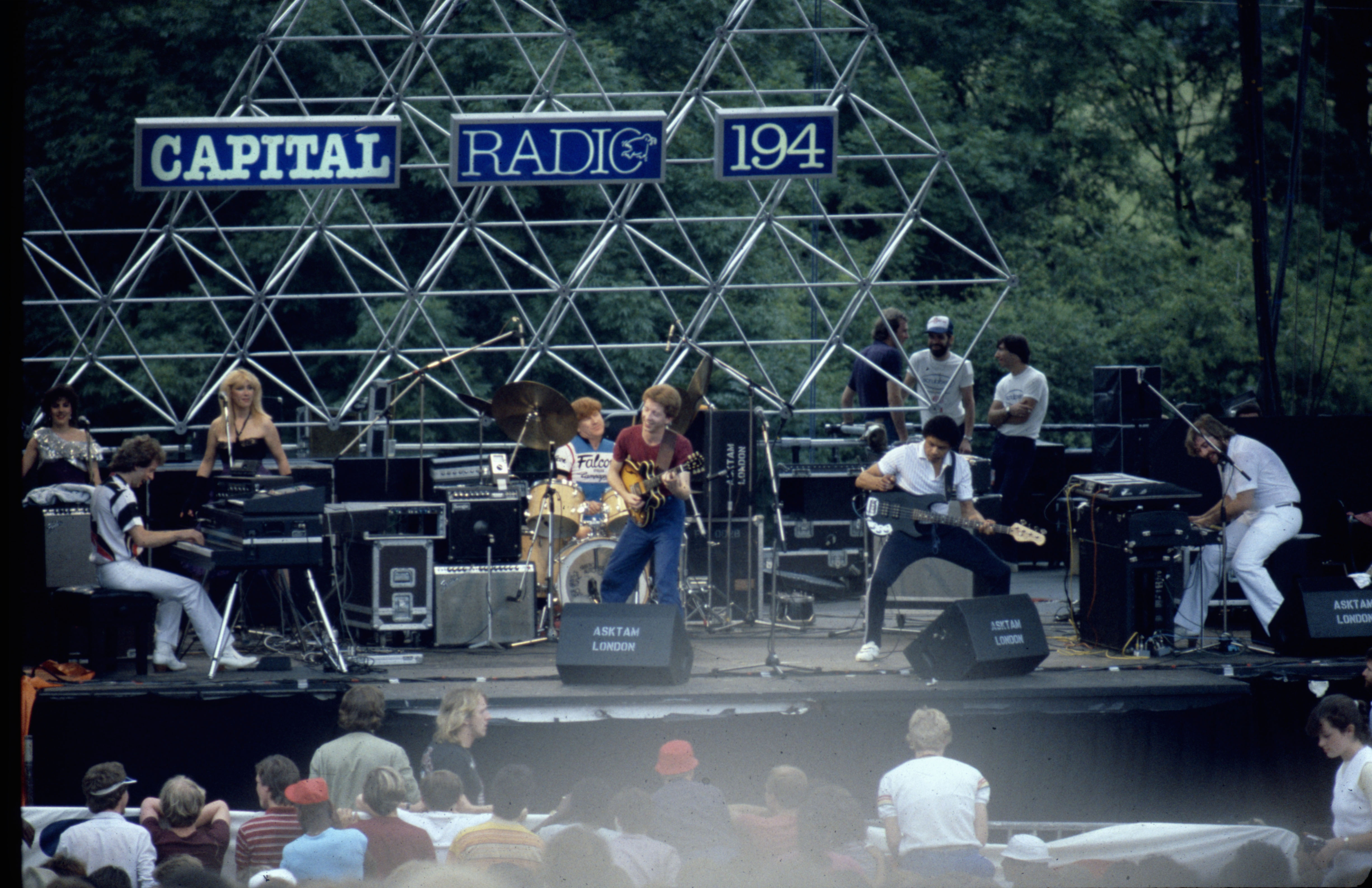
Shakatak performing at Knebworth Park as part of the Capital Radio Jazz Festival, 1982.

This article is the discography of British jazz-funk band Shakatak.

== Albums ==
=== Studio albums ===
Year	Title	Details	Peak chart positions							Certifications
Year	Title	Details	UK	GER	NL	NOR	NZ	SWI	US	Certifications
1981	Drivin' Hard	Released: 29 May 1981; Label: Polydor; Formats: LP, MC	35	—	19	—	—	—	—	BPI: Silver
1982	Night Birds	Released: May 1982; Label: Polydor; Formats: LP, MC	4	—	32	25	35	—	(Note: Peaked at number 55 on the Top R&B/Hip-Hop Albums.)	BPI: Gold
1982	Invitations	Released: November 1982; Label: Polydor; Formats: LP, MC	30	—	—	—	33	—	—	BPI: Gold
1983	Out of This World	Released: September 1983; Label: Polydor; Formats: LP, MC	30	60	—	—	—	—	—	
1984	Down on the Street	Released: August 1984; Label: Polydor; Formats: CD, LP, MC	17	18	14	19	—	16	(Note: Peaked at number 33 on the Traditional Jazz Albums.)	
1985	City Rhythm	Released: November 1985; Label: Polydor; Formats: CD, LP, MC; Also released as Day By Day	—	—	36	—	—	25	—	
1986	Into the Blue	Released: 25 June 1986; Label: Polydor; Formats: CD, LP; Japan and Europe-only release	—	—	—	—	—	—	—	
1987	Golden Wings	Released: 25 June 1987; Label: Polydor; Formats: CD, LP; Japan-only release	—	—	—	—	—	—	—	
1988	Manic & Cool	Released: March 1988; Label: Polydor; Formats: CD, LP, MC; First released in Japan in December 1987 with different track listing as Never Stop Your Love	—	34	—	—	—	—	—	
1988	Da Makani	Released: 25 May 1988; Label: Polydor; Formats: CD, LP; Japan-only release	—	—	—	—	—	—	—	
1989	Niteflite	Released: 25 June 1989; Label: Polydor; Formats: CD; Japan-only release	—	—	—	—	—	—	—	
1989	Turn the Music Up	Released: 4 September 1989; Label: Polydor; Formats: CD, LP, MC	—	—	—	—	—	—	—	
1990	Fiesta	Released: 30 June 1990; Label: Polydor; Formats: CD; Japan-only release	—	—	—	—	—	—	—	
1990	Christmas Eve	Released: 1 November 1990; Label: Polydor; Formats: CD; Japan-only release	—	—	—	—	—	—	—	
1991	Bitter Sweet	Released: April 1991; Label: Polydor; Formats: CD, LP, MC	—	—	—	—	—	—	—	
1991	Utopia	Released: 25 June 1991; Label: Polydor; Formats: CD; Japan-only release	—	—	—	—	—	—	—	
1992	Street Level	Released: 25 April 1992; Label: Polydor, Inside Out; Formats: CD; Released everywhere other than Japan in 1993	—	—	—	—	—	—	—	
1992	Merry Christmas in Summer	Released: 16 November 1992; Label: Polydor; Formats: CD; Japan-only release	—	—	—	—	—	—	—	
1992	Christmas Dreams	Released: 26 November 1992; Label: Polydor, Verve; Formats: CD; Japan and US-only release; Includes tracks from Christmas Eve	—	—	—	—	—	—	—	
1993	Under the Sun	Released: November 1993; Label: Polydor, Inside Out; Formats: CD	—	—	—	—	—	—	—	
1994	Full Circle	Released: October 1994; Label: Polydor, Inside Out; Formats: CD	—	—	—	—	—	—	—	
1997	Let the Piano Play	Released: 21 August 1997; Label: Victor, Inside Out; Formats: CD	—	—	—	—	—	—	—	
1998	View from the City	Released: 23 September 1998; Label: Victor, Inside Out; Formats: CD	—	—	—	—	—	—	—	
2001	Under Your Spell	Released: 21 June 2001; Label: Victor, Inside Out; Formats: CD	—	—	—	—	—	—	—	
2003	Blue Savannah	Released: 23 July 2003; Label: Victor, Passion Jazz; Formats: CD	—	—	—	—	—	—	—	
2005	Beautiful Day	Released: 23 February 2005; Label: Synergy/Victor, Shakatak; Formats: CD, digital download	—	—	—	—	—	—	—	
2007	Emotionally Blue	Released: 21 March 2007; Label: Synergy/Victor, Shakatak; Formats: CD, digital download	—	—	—	—	—	—	—	
2009	Afterglow	Released: 25 February 2009; Label: Victor, Secret; Formats: CD, digital download	—	—	—	—	—	—	—	
2011	Across the World	Released: 20 April 2011; Label: Victor, Secret; Formats: CD, digital download	—	—	—	—	—	—	—	
2013	Once Upon a Time – The Acoustic Sessions	Released: 20 February 2013; Label: Victor, Secret; Formats: CD, digital download	—	—	—	—	—	—	—	
2014	On the Corner	Released: 21 May 2014; Label: Victor, Secret; Formats: CD, digital download	—	—	—	—	—	—	—	
2016	Times and Places	Released: 20 July 2016; Label: Victor, Secret; Formats: CD, digital download	—	—	—	—	—	—	—	
2019	In the Blue Zone	Released: 22 May 2019; Label: Victor, Secret; Formats: CD, digital download	—	—	—	—	—	—	—	
2023	Eyes of the World	Released: 20 September 2023; Label: Victor, Secret; Formats: CD, LP, digital download	—	—	—	—	—	—	—	
"—" denotes releases that did not chart or were not released in that territory										

=== Live albums ===
Year	Title	Details	Peak chart positions			
Year	Title	Details	UK	GER	NL	SWI
1984	Live in Japan	Released: April 1984; Label: Polydor; Formats: 2xLP; Japan-only release	—	—	—	—
1985	Live!	Released: February 1985; Label: Polydor; Formats: CD, LP, MC; Includes some tracks from the Live in Japan album	82	48	21	23
1998	Live at Ronnie Scott's Club	Released: April 1998; Label: Indigo, Victor; Formats: CD	—	—	—	—
2011	Greatest Hits – Live at the Playhouse	Released: 25 March 2011; Label: Secret; Formats: CD+DVD, digital download	—	—	—	—
2016	In Concert	Released: 4 December 2016; Label: Secret; Formats: CD+DVD, digital download	—	—	—	—
2019	Live at the Duo Music Exchange	Released: 27 September 2019; Label: Secret; Formats: CD+DVD	—	—	—	—
2020	Greatest Hits Live	Released: 28 February 2020; Label: Secret; Formats: 2xCD+DVD, digital download	—	—	—	—
2021	Live in Lockdown	Released: 25 June 2021; Label: Secret; Formats: CD, digital download	—	—	—	—
2024	Nightbirds Session + Greatest Hits Live at The Stables	Released: 2024; Label: Secret; Formats: 2xCD+DVD, digital download	—	—	—	—
"—" denotes releases that did not chart or were not released in that territory

=== Compilation albums ===
Year	Title	Details	Peak chart positions	
Year	Title	Details	UK	US Con. Jazz
1982	The Best of Shakatak	Released: 1982; Label: Polydor; Formats: LP; Japan-only release	—	—
1982	The Greatest Shakatak	Released: 1982; Label: Polydor; Formats: 2xLP; Japan-only release	—	—
1984	Best Collection	Released: 1984; Label: Polydor; Formats: CD; Japan-only release	—	—
1986	The Best Of	Released: 1 February 1986; Label: Polydor; Formats: CD; Japan-only release	—	—
1988	The Very Best of Shakatak	Released: 1988; Label: Polydor; Formats: CD; Japan-only release	—	—
1988	The Coolest Cuts	Released: October 1988; Label: K-tel, Polydor; Formats: CD, LP, MC	73	—
1990	Greatest Grooves	Released: July 1990; Label: Connoisseur Collection; Formats: 2xLP	—	—
1990	Perfect Smile	Released: October 1990; Label: Verve Forecast; Formats: CD, MC; US-only release	—	10
1991	Night Moves	Released: 1991; Label: Pickwick; Formats: CD, MC	—	—
1991	Open Your Eyes	Released: October 1991; Label: Verve Forecast; Formats: CD, MC; US-only release	—	12
1991	Remix Best Album	Released: December 1991; Label: Polydor; Formats: CD, MC	—	—
1993	The Christmas Album	Released: 1993; Label: Inside Out; Formats: CD	—	—
1996	The Collection	Released: 1996; Label: Spectrum Music; Formats: CD	—	—
1996	Jazz Connections Volumes 1–6	Released: 1993; Label: Inside Out; Formats: 6xCD; 6 compilation albums of their exclusive Japanese albums from the 1980s and early 1990s	—	—
1998	Shinin' On	Released: June 1998; Label: Instinct Jazz; Formats: CD; US-only release	—	—
1999	Jazz in the Night	Released: December 1999; Label: Inside Out; Formats: CD	—	—
2000	The Magic of Shakatak – Magical Shakatak Moments 1990–2000	Released: 2000; Label: Inside Out; Formats: 2xCD	—	—
2000	The Collection Volume 2	Released: 25 September 2000; Label: Spectrum Music; Formats: CD	—	—
2001	After Dark	Released: 2001; Label: Inside Out; Formats: CD	—	—
2001	The Best of Shakatak	Released: 19 December 2001; Label: Victor; Formats: CD; Japan-only release	—	—
2002	Dinner Jazz	Released: 2002; Label: Passion Jazz; Formats: CD	—	—
2003	Smooth Solos	Released: 2003; Label: Passion Jazz; Formats: CD	—	—
2004	Drive Time – Seventeen Smooth Jazz Gems	Released: November 2004; Label: Passion Music; Formats: CD	—	—
2008	The Best Of	Released: 2008; Label: Secret; Formats: CD	—	—
2008	The Ultimate Collection	Released: 4 June 2008; Label: Victor; Formats: 2xCD; Japan-only release	—	—
2011	Christmas Collection	Released: 2 November 2011; Label: Victor; Formats: CD; Japan-only release	—	—
2012	The 12 Inch Mixes	Released: 29 October 2012; Label: Secret; Formats: 2xCD, digital download	—	—
2013	More 12 Inch Mixes	Released: 2 September 2013; Label: Secret; Formats: 2xCD, digital download	—	—
2014	Snowflakes & Jazzamatazz – The Christmas Album	Released: 3 November 2014; Label: Secret; Formats: 2xCD, digital download		
2020	All Around the World – 40th Anniversary Edition	Released: 14 August 2020; Label: Secret; Formats: 3xCD+DVD, digital download	—	—
2022	The Ultimate Chill Collection	Released: 2022; Label: Secret; Formats: CD, digital download	—	—
"—" denotes releases that did not chart or were not released in that territory

=== Repackaged sets ===
Year	Title	Details
1982	Drivin' Hard / Night Birds	Released: 1982; Label: Polydor; Formats: MC
1984	Drivin' Hard / Invitations	Released: 1984; Label: Polydor; Formats: 2xLP; South Africa and Zimbabwe-only release
1985	Volume 2 – Down on the Street / Night Birds	Released: 1985; Label: Polydor; Formats: 2xLP; South Africa and Zimbabwe-only release
2014	Golden Wings + Into the Blue	Released: 6 October 2014; Label: Secret; Formats: 2xCD, digital download
2016	Da Makani + Niteflite	Released: 4 March 2016; Label: Secret; Formats: 2xCD, digital download
2017	Bitter Sweet + Turn the Music Up	Released: 15 September 2017; Label: Secret; Formats: 2xCD, digital download
2017	Fiesta + Utopia	Released: 17 November 2017; Label: Secret; Formats: 2xCD, digital download
2018	Street Level + Under the Sun	Released: 31 August 2018; Label: Secret; Formats: 2xCD, digital download
2019	Full Circle + Let the Piano Play	Released: 25 October 2019; Label: Secret; Formats: 2xCD, digital download
2021	View from the City + Under Your Spell	Released: 29 January 2021; Label: Secret; Formats: 2xCD, digital download
2021	Blue Savannah + Beautiful Day	Released: 26 March 2021; Label: Secret; Formats: 2xCD, digital download

=== Video albums ===
Year	Title	Details
1985	Twilight Sensation	Released: 26 January 1985; Label: Victor; Formats: VHS, LaserDisc; Japan-only release
1986	Into the Blue	Released: 1986; Label: Polydor; Formats: LaserDisc; Japan-only release
1988	Da Makani (1988 Kenwood Cup Yacht Race)	Released: 1988; Label: Polydor; Formats: LaserDisc; Japan-only release
1989	Turn the Music Up	Released: 1989; Label: Polydor; Formats: VHS; Promo-only release
2004	In Concert	Released: August 2004; Label: in-akustik; Formats: DVD; Germany-only release
2004	Live at the Playhouse	Released: October 2004; Label: Secret; Formats: DVD

== Singles ==
Year	Single	Peak chart positions									Album
Year	Single	UK	AUS	BE (FLA)	FRA	GER	IRE	NL	SPA	US Dance	Album
1980	"Steppin'"	—	—	—	—	—	—	—	—	—	Drivin' Hard
1980	"Feels Like the Right Time"	41	—	—	—	—	—	—	—	—	Non-album single
1981	"Living in the U.K."	52	—	—	—	—	—	—	—	—	Drivin' Hard
1981	"Brazilian Dawn"	48	—	—	—	—	—	—	—	—	Drivin' Hard
1981	"Easier Said Than Done"	12	—	18	—	—	—	18	—	—	Night Birds
1982	"Night Birds"	9	92	32	—	—	27	34	8	—	Night Birds
1982	"Streetwalkin'"	38	—	—	—	—	—	—	—	—	Night Birds
1982	"Invitations"	24	—	—	—	—	17	—	—	—	Invitations
1982	"Stranger"	43	—	—	—	—	—	—	—	—	Invitations
1983	"Dark Is the Night"	15	—	—	—	—	18	32	—	—	Out of This World
1983	"If You Could See Me Now"	49	—	—	—	—	—	—	—	—	Out of This World
1983	"Out of This World"	78	—	—	—	—	—	—	—	—	Out of This World
1984	"Down on the Street"	9	—	23	25	17	30	31	—	27	Down on the Street
1984	"Don't Blame It on Love"	55	—	—	—	—	—	—	—	—	Down on the Street
1984	"Watching You"	79	—	32	—	—	—	14	—	—	Down on the Street
1985	"Megamix" (12" promo-only release)	—	—	—	—	—	—	—	—	—	Non-album single
1985	"City Rhythm"	77	—	—	—	—	—	44	—	—	City Rhythm
1985	"Day by Day" (with Al Jarreau)	53	—	—	—	—	—	46	—	—	City Rhythm
1986	"Deja Vu (To the Wind)" (Japan-only release)	—	—	—	—	—	—	—	—	—	Into the Blue
1986	"This Boy Is Mine" (Japan-only release)	—	—	—	—	—	—	—	—	—	Into the Blue
1987	"Something Special"	—	—	—	—	—	—	—	—	—	Manic & Cool
1987	"Golden Wings" (12" Japan-only release)	—	—	—	—	—	—	—	—	—	Golden Wings
1987	"Mr. Manic & Sister Cool"	56	—	—	—	18	—	31	—	—	Manic & Cool
1987	"L'aggio L'amour" (Japan-only release)	—	—	—	—	—	—	—	—	—	Golden Wings
1988	"Walk the Walk" (Europe and Australasia-only release)	—	—	—	—	—	—	—	—	—	Manic & Cool
1988	"Racing with the Wind" (Japan-only release)	—	—	—	—	—	—	—	—	—	Da Makani
1988	"Dr! Dr!"	—	—	—	—	—	—	—	—	—	Manic & Cool
1988	"Time of My life" (Germany-only release)	—	—	—	—	70	—	—	—	—	Manic & Cool
1988	"The Coolest Shakatak Cuts (Megamix)" (12" promo-only release)	—	—	—	—	—	—	—	—	—	Non-album single
1989	"Turn the Music Up"	83	—	—	—	—	—	—	—	—	Turn the Music Up
1989	"Back to the Groove" (12" promo-only release)	—	—	—	—	—	—	—	—	—	Turn the Music Up
1991	"Bitter Sweet" (12" promo-only release)	—	—	—	—	—	—	—	—	—	Bitter Sweet
1991	"Silent Eve" (Japan-only release)	—	—	—	—	—	—	—	—	—	Christmas Dreams
1993	"One Day at a Time"	—	—	—	—	—	—	—	—	—	Street Level
1994	"Brazilian Love Affair"	—	—	—	—	—	—	—	—	—	Full Circle
1997	"Let the Piano Play"	—	—	—	—	—	—	—	—	—	Let the Piano Play
1998	"Move a Little Closer"	—	—	—	—	—	—	—	—	—	View from the City
1998	"Say What You Want" (Japan promo-only release)	—	—	—	—	—	—	—	—	—	View from the City
2001	"Down on the Street 2001" (vs Wackside; Germany-only release)	—	—	—	—	89	—	—	—	—	Non-album single
2011	"Trouble"	—	—	—	—	—	—	—	—	—	Across the World
2014	"The Greatest Gift"	—	—	—	—	—	—	—	—	—	On the Corner
2014	"On the Corner"	—	—	—	—	—	—	—	—	—	On the Corner
2019	"To Be Loved"	—	—	—	—	—	—	—	—	—	In the Blue Zone
2020	"All Around the World Tonight"	—	—	—	—	—	—	—	—	—	All Around the World
"—" denotes releases that did not chart or were not released in that territory
