= This Year's Blonde (band) =

British pop band

- Genres: Pop music
- Years active: 1981–87
- Labels: Creole, Debut
- Past members: Tracy Ackerman; Nigel Wright; Les McCutcheon; Robin Sellars

This Year's Blonde was a musical project created by Nigel Wright in 1981.

== History ==
In 1981, with a craze for medley recordings making the British singles chart, record producer Nigel Wright made a medley single under the name Enigma, with musicians including those associated with Wright's band Shakatak, plus vocalist Tracy Ackerman and drummer Robin Sellars (Ackerman's boyfriend), who were both called into the session at the last minute.

Enigma was booked to perform on the television show Top of the Pops, but was forced to postpone; undaunted, Wright, Sellars, and Ackerman retreated to a studio in London, and recorded a medley of Blondie songs, inspired by Ackerman's blonde hair. The resulting single, "Platinum Pop", was released under the name This Year's Blonde; unlike the co-vocalists for Enigma, Ackerman handled all vocals and the record sleeve only included her picture.

The single entered the UK Singles Chart for the week ending 10 October 1981, and, as if to make up for Enigma missing out on a scheduled appearance, This Year's Blonde, unusually, performed on the show in consecutive weeks; as the playout on the 15 October show and to open the show on the 22nd, meaning the song was actually played consecutively in the show's run. However, despite this extra publicity, the song could climb no higher than No. 46.

With the medley craze over, the name was retired, as Wright used the Mirage name for releases in 1984, but in 1985 Wright and Ackerman recorded a medley of Madonna songs under the name Mirage featuring Tracy Ackerman, on the Debut Records label. The recording made No. 87, but, in 1987, Wright, Ackerman, and Sellars revised the idea of a Madonna medley by adding more songs to the mix, revived the This Year's Blonde name once more, and released the cut on Debut Records. This second attempt, called "Who's That Mix", was a slightly greater success, getting to No. 62 on the charts.

The single was the last release under the This Year's Blonde name. Wright's later medley-style songs were issued as Mirage, and usually featured Ackerman as singer, albeit the female vocals were fronted in performances by Kiki Billy rather than Ackerman.
