= Down on the Street (album) =

Studio album by Shakatak
- Released: September 17, 1984
- Recorded: January–May 1984
- Studio: Mirival Studios (Marseille); Chipping Norton Studios (Oxford); Rock City Studios (Shepperton); Blank Tape Studio (New York City); CBS Studios (London)
- Genre: Jazz-funk, crossover
- Length: 38:09
- Label: Polydor
- Producer: Nigel Wright

Shakatak chronology
Out Of This World (1983)	Down on the Street (1984)	City Rhythm (1985)

Down on the Street is the fifth studio album by the London jazz-funk band Shakatak, released in 1984. The album peaked at no. 17 on the UK Albums Chart, and produced the band's second top-ten UK single "Down on the Street", which peaked at no. 9 on the UK Singles Chart. The album produced two other singles: "Watching You" and "Don't Blame It on Love".

== Track listing ==
All tracks written by Bill Sharpe & Roger Odell except where noted.

Side A

1. "Down on the Street" – 3:22
2. "Holding On" (George Anderson/Jill Saward) – 4:34
3. "Summer Sky" – 4:22
4. "Hypnotised" (Sharpe) – 4:28

Side B

1. "Don't Blame It on Love" – 3:25
2. "Photograph" – 4:25
3. "Watching You" – 5:22
4. "Fire Dance" – 5:00
5. "Lady (To Billie Holiday)" – 3:11

== Charts ==
=== Album charts ===
Chart (1984–85)	Peak position
UK Albums Chart	17
Dutch Album Top 100	14
Germany Top 100 Albums	18
Norwegian Charts	19
Swiss Hitparade	14

=== Singles charts ===
Single	Chart	Peak position
"Watching You"	UK Singles Chart	79
"Watching You"	Dutch Singles	14
"Watching You"	Ultratop Belgian Charts	32
"Down on the Street"	Dance Club Songs (U.S.)	27
"Down on the Street"	UK Singles Chart	9
"Down on the Street"	Top 100 Singles (Germany)	17
"Down on the Street"	Dutch Singles	31
"Down on the Street"	French Singles Chart	25
"Down on the Street"	Ultratop Belgian Charts	23
"Don't Blame It on Love"	UK Singles Chart	55

== Personnel ==
- Jill Saward – vocals
- Bill Sharpe – keyboards
- George Anderson – bass guitar
- Keith Winter – guitars
- Roger Odell – drums
