= Out of This World (Shakatak album) =

Studio album by Shakatak
- Released: 14 October 1983
- Recorded: July/August 1983
- Studio: Battery Studios (London); Rock City Studios (Surrey)
- Genre: Jazz-funk, Crossover
- Length: 40:08
- Label: Polydor
- Producer: Nigel Wright

Shakatak chronology
| Invitations (1982) | Out of This World (1983) | Down on the Street (1984) |

Professional ratings
Review scores
| Source | Rating |
|---|---|
| AllMusic | 2.5/5 stars |

Out of This World, released in 1983 on the Polydor label, is the fourth album by English jazz-funk band Shakatak.

== Track listing ==
All tracks written by William "Bill" Sharpe and Roger Odell.

Side 1:

1. "Dark Is the Night" – 5:28
2. "Don't Say That Again" – 4:46
3. "Slip Away" – 5:19
4. "On Nights Like Tonight" – 5:13

Side 2:

1. "Out of This World" – 5:53
2. "Let's Get Together" – 3:48
3. "If You Could See Me Now" – 6:56
4. "Sanur" – 4:45

== Personnel ==
- Bill Sharpe – keyboards
- Keith Winter – guitars
- George Anderson – bass, backing vocals
- Roger Odell – drums & percussion
- Jill Saward – vocals, lead on "Let's Get Together"
- Norma Lewis – vocals

=== Guest musicians and vocalists ===
- Lead vocal on "Nights Like Tonight" – Tracy Ackerman
- Percussion – Simon Morton
- Trumpet – Stuart Brookes
- Saxophone – Martin Dobson
- Brass arrangement – Nigel Wright
