= Enigma (British band) =

British disco band

- Genres: Disco
- Years active: 1981–1987
- Label: Creole Records
- Past members: Tino Rowe; Martin Jay; Jill Saward; Tracy Ackerman; Steve Underwood

Enigma was a musical project by British producer and musician Nigel Wright in the early 1980s. The recordings were by session musicians and singers who performed medleys of popular disco tracks. In 1981, the singles "Ain't No Stopping" and "I Love Music" reached No. 11 and No. 25 on the UK Singles Chart, respectively. They also released an album, Ain't No Stoppin', which reached No. 80 on the UK Albums Chart in September 1981. Their releases were under the Creole Records label.

Band members were Tino Rowe (vocals), Martin Jay (vocals and guitar), Jill Saward (vocals), Tracy Ackerman (as Tracy Lee Ackerman) (vocals), and Steve Underwood (bass guitar). Saward, Ackerman and Underwood all had associations with the band Shakatak, of which Wright was a member.

In 1987, Wright released one more single under this name before embarking on another remix project under the name Mirage, which also scored a few hits over a brief period.

== Discography ==
=== Albums ===
Year	Album	UK
1981	Ain't No Stoppin'	80

=== Singles ===
Year	Song	UK
1981	"Ain't No Stopping"	11
1981	"I Love Music"	25
1981	"Summer Groovin'"	—
1987	"Which Way Is Up"	—
"—" denotes releases that did not chart.
