= Drivin' Hard =

Studio album by Shakatak
- Released: 29 May 1981
- Recorded: Majestic London & Strawberry South
- Genre: Jazz-funk, crossover
- Length: 45:16
- Label: Polydor
- Producer: Nigel Wright

Shakatak chronology
Drivin' Hard (1981)	Night Birds (1982)

Drivin' Hard, released in May 1981 on the Polydor label, is the first album by English jazz-funk band Shakatak.

== Track listing ==
All tracks written by William "Bill" Sharpe except where indicated.

1. "Livin in the U.K." (Stayton Heyward; Neil Heyward; Bill Sharpe; Wally Badarou) – 5:54
2. "Into the Night" – 4:36
3. "Toot the Shoot" (Roger Odell) – 4:00
4. "Lumiere" 4:14
5. "Late Night Flight" – 3:58
6. "Waves" – 1:38
7. "Steppin' (Live)" – 6:27 *
8. "Covina" – 4:46
9. "You Never Know" – 5:10
10. "Brazilian Dawn" – 6:33
- As of June 2025, the version of Steppin’ used by streaming services is the incorrect, shorter, studio version instead of the Live version.

== Personnel ==
- Bill Sharpe – Bösendorfer grand piano, keyboards
- Nigel Wright – Fender Rhodes electric piano, Sennheiser Vocoder, Oberheim OB-X synthesizer, keyboards and synthesizers
- Wally Badarou – Prophet 5 and inspiration
- Keith Winter – Yamaha & Fender guitars with Fender amplification, Ovation acoustic guitars
- Steve Underwood – Fender bass with Fender amplification
- Roger Odell – Sonor drums, Rototoms, synth drums, Zildjian cymbals
- Jill Saward – vocals
- Jackie Rawe – vocals

== Formats ==
- LP: Polydor POLS 1030 [47'08] (May 1981, red label)
- LP: Polydor 2383 635 (1981, Netherlands), extra track A1 "Easier Said Than Done"
- MC: Polydor POLSC 1030 [47'08] (May 1981)
- CD: Polydor 823 017-2 [47'11] (1984, track 7 is in fact the studio version of "Steppin'" [5'50])
- CD: Victor VICP 64131 (2008, Japan), bonus tracks "Feels Like the Right Time" and "Killing Time"
