= Roberto Tola =

Italian jazz guitarist and composer (born 1966)

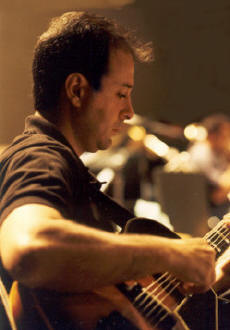
- Roberto Tola in Valencia - Spain Tour 2004

Background information
- Born: August 5, 1966 (age 60); Sassari, Italy
- Genres: Jazz, smooth jazz, Jazz fusion, Latin Jazz
- Occupations: Musician, composer
- Instrument: Guitar
- Years active: 1983–present
- Members: Recording Academy
- Website: robertotola.com

Roberto Tola (born August 5, 1966) is an Italian jazz guitarist and composer.

== Biography ==
Tola began studying music when he was just six years old. In 1976 studies cello in the Conservatory of Music in Sassari. Four years later continues his studies of Modern and Jazz Guitar and in 1983 established a sextet named Jazzmania. For this band Tola composed and arranged the album Preludio in 1985. From 1989 Tola was in the Italian Blue Note Orchestra, then from 1991 to 2012 he was the guitarist of the OJS big band (the Sardinia Jazz Orchestra).

In 2005 he served as the conductor of the 26-member orchestra for the national competition "Canzonissima 2000".

Meantime he collaborates with many others artists and bands, as the conductors Colin Towns, Carla Bley, Giorgio Gaslini, Giancarlo Gazzani, Bruno Tommaso, Mario Raja, Marco Tiso and Roberto Pregadio; the famous singer Jill Saward, Norma Winstone, David Linx and the famous Italian jazz singer Gegè Telesforo. The trumpetists Flavio Boltro, Giovanni Amato, Paolo Fresu, Enrico Rava and magic Tom Harrell; the Bassist Steve Swallow, the drummer Billy Cobham, Saxes Bob Mintzer (member of Yellowjackets), Eric Marienthal, Najee, Paul Taylor, Paula Atherton, Andy Sheppard, Javier Girotto, Maurizio Gianmarco; the pianist Scott Wilkie, Riccardo Zegna, accordionist and pianist Antonello Salis, accordionist Richard Galliano and others else.

Has been teaching music, modern and jazz guitar in several Italian music schools for more than 20 years.

In 2014 collaborates for the album On The Corner by the English jazz-funk band Shakatak.

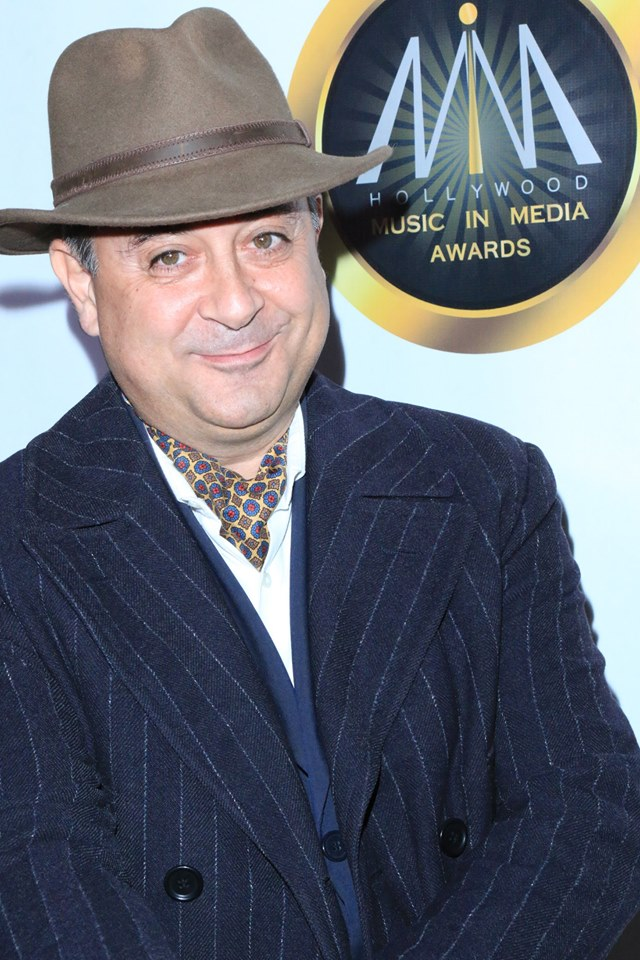
Roberto Tola at the Hollywood Music in Media Awards - November 2017 at The Avalon Theatre, Hollywood

in 2016 together with English jazz musicians, as Mornington Lockett, Derek Nash, George Anderson, appears in the album Endless Summer and also in the single "M is for Manhattan" by the English singer Jill Saward.

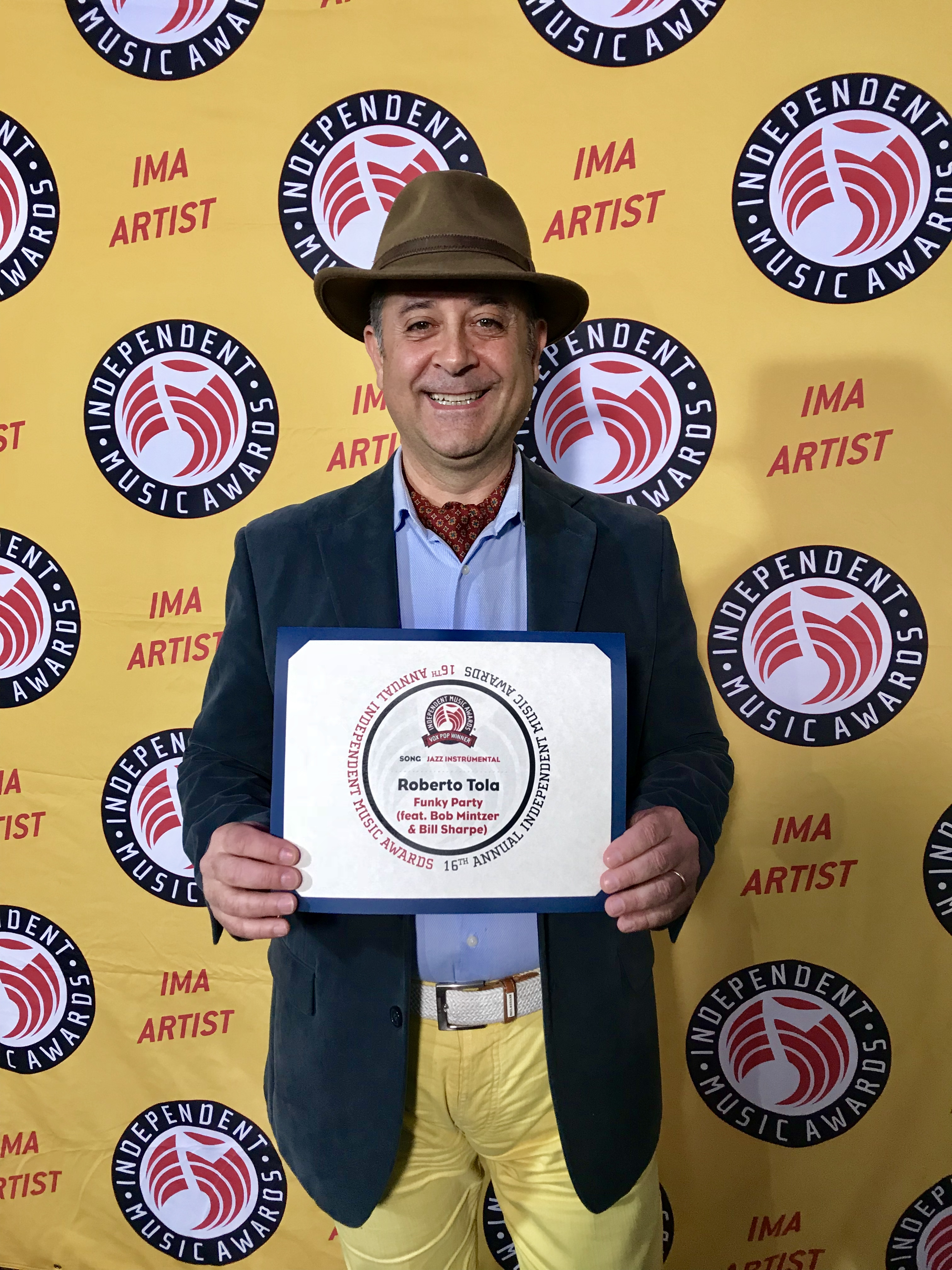
Roberto Tola - 16th Annual Independent Music Awards - New York City, Lincoln Center - March 2018

In May 2017 Tola released his first solo album titled Bein' Green. recorded in Sardinia (Italy), Spain, UK and US. The album features some world-class musicians, including Bob Mintzer, Najee, Bill McGee, Jill Saward, Bill Sharpe and Tim Collins.

In September 2017 the album Bein' Green was awarded with the Silver Medal at the Global Music Awards, in the Jazz Music and Best Album categories.

In November 2017 Tola attended the 8th Annual Hollywood Music in Media Awards held in The Avalon in Los Angeles, as nominee for the Jazz Category for the outstanding achievement of his single "Sunny Morning" from the album Bein' Green.

Again in November 2017, Roberto Tola is the Best Jazz Artist 2017 and his song "Sunny Morning" is the Best Jazz Song of the Year for the Radio Music Awards, a radio network competition conceived and powered by the Indie Music Channel association.

In March 2018 Tola was honoured with the Vox Pop Award during the 16th Annual Independent Music Awards at the Lincoln Center in New York, for his song "Funky Party" in the Jazz Instrumental Song Category. The awarded song also features the famous saxophonist Bob Mintzer and keyboardist Bill Sharpe.

In April 2018 the Indie Music Channel Awards association honoured Roberto Tola with seven Awards, corresponding to the following categories: the Best Jazz Song with the song "Flying Away", Best Jazz Recording with "Tears for Niro", Best Jazz Instrumentalist for "Funky Party", Best Jazz Producer with "Cabriolet", and also Best Recording of the Year with the song "Tears For Niro" and Best New Male Artist of the Year.

In September 2018, the Hollywood Music in Media Awards, the prestigious musical contest, early held in the famous The Avalon in Hollywood, nominated Roberto Tola for the second time (previous one has been in the 2017), with the song Funky Party, in the Jazz Category.

In October 2018, the song Lullaby of Christmas (featuring the trumpeter Bill McGee), composed by Roberto Tola and released in December 2017, has been accepted and nominated by the Recording Academy to the 1st Ballot for the 61st GRAMMY AWARDS nomination.

In 2019 Roberto Tola got three other new nominations for three different music contests: 17th Independent Music Awards, with his single Lullaby of Christmas (feat. Bill McGee) in the Instrumental Category; 2nd Atlas Elite Entertainment Music Awards with the single Slow Motion (feat. the American singer Darryl F. Walker) in the Jazz Category; One World Music Awards with the CD Album BEIN' GREEN for the Best Jazz Album

Meanwhile, the artist continues to compose, record and tour all around the world.

2020 marks the year of the artist's second album entitled Colors, which still sees the participation of internationally renowned musicians such as Michael Lington, Paula Atherton, Rocco Ventrella, Bill McGee, Darryl Walker, Mando Cordova. The album includes "Slow Motion" and "Lullaby Of Christmas".

In 2021, just during the pandemic due to COVID, Roberto Tola produces his third album entitled Kon Tiki, with notable special guests such as the legendary Billy Cobham, saxophonist Eric Marienthal, pianist Scott Wilkie and the talented Italian jazz player Andrea Tofanelli.

In 2023, the fourth album by Roberto Tola comes to light, entitled Under The Leo Sign, a blend of musical genres ranging from jazz, funk, contemporary jazz to Latin jazz and light rock, in a mix that today it takes the name of Crossover Jazz, of which Roberto Tola is probably one of the greatest representatives. The album was awarded the silver medal at the Global Music Awards in September 2023.

2025 is the year of the fifth album entitled Jazz Junction, an album recorded between Italy, the United States, Argentina and Poland, featuring other international artists such as Giovanni Amato (flugelhorn), Darryl Walker (vocals) and Zorina Andall (vocals and choir). This album also boasts a mix of Jazz, Latin Jazz, Funk and Soul that Roberto Tola is fond of.

Just released, the album Jazz Junction has already garnered multiple nominations in some of the most prestigious music contests worldwide. It received three nominations at the Hollywood Independent Musi Awards, which will take place on July 30, 2025, at the iconic Avalon Hollywood Theatre. The nominations are for three tracks from the album in different categories: Jazz (with the track "Lightness" featuring Darryl Walker on vocals), Latin (with the track "From Rio To São Paulo"), and Holiday (with the Christmas song "Christmas For Sale", featuring Zorina Andall on vocals, which tells the story of unrequited love).

Jazz Junction and several tracks from the project are also nominated for the upcoming Latin Grammy Awards, scheduled for November 13 at the MGM Grand Garden Arena in Las Vegas.

In almost four decades of musical career, he has participated in hundreds of concerts and dozens of festivals in Italy, Europe up to the Far East to China, among which are: Smooth Hot Jazz (Madrid - Spain), Festival "Jazz del Mediterranei"(Valencia - Spain) and Spain Tour 2004, several participations at the "Time in Jazz" International Festival (Berchidda - Italy), multiple participations in the "Writing in Jazz" (Sassari - Italy), Jazz Op (Udine - Italy), Bergamo Jazz Festival (Italy), Vivere Jazz Festival (Fiesole - Italy), participation in various editions of the Nuoro Jazz Seminars (Nuoro - Italy), China Tour 2001 (China), Sant'Anna Arresi Jazz Festival 1996 (Italy), Fiera della Musica (Ferrara - Italy), Estiamo in Piazza Festival (Ozieri - Italy).

Roberto Tola has collaborated with multiple artists, including:

- Bob Mintzer
- Carla Bley
- Tom Harrell
- Norma Winstone
- Steve Swallow
- Richard Galliano
- Javier Girotto
- Giorgio Gaslini
- Giancarlo Gazzani
- Bruno Tommaso
- Roberto Pregadio
- Jill Saward
- David Linx
- Gegè Telesforo
- Michael Lington
- Paul Taylor
- Paula Atherton
- Najee
- Bill Sharpe
- Rocco Ventrella
- Andy Sheppard
- Maurizio Gianmarco
- Flavio Boltro
- Giovanni Amato
- Paolo Fresu
- Enrico Rava
- Antonello Salis.

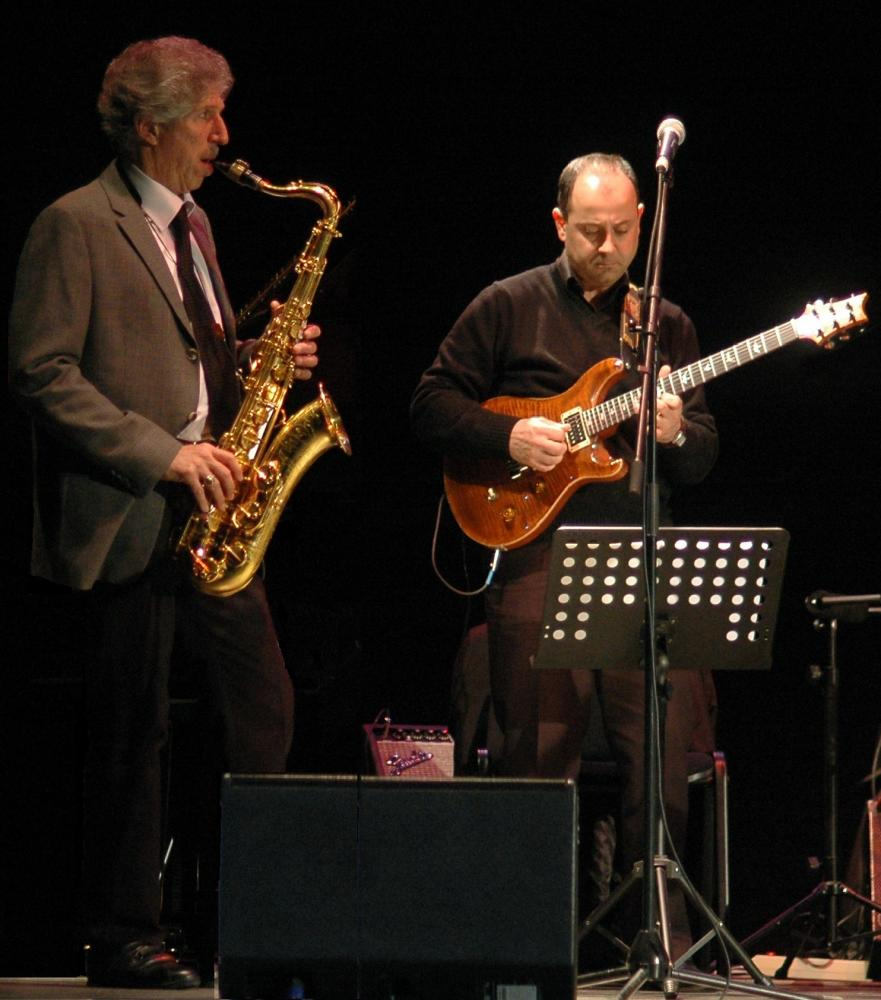
Roberto Tola with Bob Mintzer Italy Tour 2008

== Discography ==
=== As leader ===
- Bein' Green (RT Music, 2017)
- Colors (RT Music, 2020)
- Kon Tiki (EBM, 2021)
- Under The Leo Sign (EBM, 2023)
- Jazz Junction (EBM, 2025)

=== Singles ===
- Lullaby of Christmas (RT Music, 2017)
- Slow Motion (RT Music, 2018)
- Sunny Morning (RT Music, 2018)
- A Christmas Ago (EBM, 2021)
- Tiana (EBM, 2021)
- Says (EBM, 2022)
- Sun Kiss (EBM, 2022)
- Driving to Madrid (EBM, 2023)
- Natashenka (EBM, 2023)
- Bossa Amor (Wave of Love) (EBM, 2023)
- The Journey Ahead (EBM, 2024)
- Pigiamino (EBM, 2024)
- Christmas For Sale (instrumental) (EBM, 2024)
- Christmas For Sale (vocal version) (EBM, 2024)
- Lightness (EBM, 2025)
- From Rio São Paulo (EBM, 2025)

=== As sideman ===
- 2014: Shakatak - "On the Corner" (JVC)
- 2016: Jill Saward - "M Is For Manhattan" (Secret Records)
- 2016: Jill Saward - "Endless Summer" (Secret Records)
- 2020: Rocco Ventrella - "Feeling the Breeze" (Delilah Records)
- 2023: Bill McGee - "Tree Of Life" (804Jazz Record)

=== With Orchestra Jazz della Sardegna ===
- Scrivere in Jazz (Flex, 1996)
- Sacred Concert Jazz Te Deum (Soul Note, 2002)
- Blau (Wide Sound, 2004)
- Il Brutto Anatroccolo, Il Manifesto (2005)
- Il Brutto Anatroccolo, Live at Time in Jazz Festival (Time in Jazz, 2008)

== Videos ==
- 2006: I Am the Walrus - with Colin Towns and OJS (RT Music)
- 2017: Sunny Morning (RT Music)

== Awards and nominations ==
Year	Award	Category	Nominated work	Result	Notes
2017	Global Music Awards	Jazz Music Album	Bein' Green	Silver Medal	
2017	Global Music Awards	Album	Bein' Green	Silver Medal	
2017	8th Annual Hollywood Music in Media Awards	Jazz	Sunny Morning	Nomination	
2017	Radio Music Awards	Jazz	Sunny Morning	Winner	
2017	Radio Music Awards	Jazz	Flying Away	Winner	
2018	16th Independent Music Awards	Jazz	Funky Party	Winner	Vox Pop Award
2018	Indie Music Channel Awards	Jazz Song	Flying Away	Winner	
2018	Indie Music Channel Awards	Jazz Recording	Tears For Niro	Winner	
2018	Indie Music Channel Awards	Jazz Instrumentalist	Funky Party	Winner	
2018	Indie Music Channel Awards	Jazz Producer	Cabriolet	Winner	
2018	Indie Music Channel Awards	Jazz Video	Sunny Morning	Winner	Natalia Vlaskina co-winner
2018	Indie Music Channel Awards	Best New Male Artist of the Year		Winner	
2018	Indie Music Channel Awards	Recording of the Year	Tears For Niro		
2018	9th Annual Hollywood Music in Media Awards	Jazz	Funky Party	Nomination	
2018	Annual TheMothFM Jazz Awards (GMFM -DB Radio Group)	Best Overall Artist 2018		Winner	
2018	UK Songwriting Contest 2018	Jazz/Blues	Flying Away	Finalist	
2018	UK Songwriting Contest 2018	Jazz/Blues	Funky Party	Finalist	
2018	UK Songwriting Contest 2018	Jazz/Blues	Tears For Niro	Finalist	
2018	UK Songwriting Contest 2018	Jazz/Blues	With You All The Clouds Go Away	Finalist	
2018	UK Songwriting Contest 2018	Instrumental	Flying Away	Finalist	
2018	UK Songwriting Contest 2018	Instrumental	Funky Party	Finalist	
2018	UK Songwriting Contest 2018	Instrumental	Tears For Niro	Finalist	
2019	17th Independent Music Awards 2019	Instrumental	Lullaby of Christmas	Winner	Vox Pop Award
2019	2nd Atlas Elite Entertainment Music Awards	Jazz	Slow Motion	Winner	
2019	6th One World Music Awards	Best Jazz Album	Bein' Green	2nd Place	
2019	10th Annual Hollywood Music in Media Awards	Jazz	Slow Motion	Nomination	
2020	18th Annual Independent Music Awards	Jazz	Slow Motion	Winner	Vox Pop Award
2020	19th UKSC Music Contest (United Kingdom)	Jazz	Preludio	Semifinal	Finalist TBA
2020	19th UKSC Music Contest (United Kingdom)	International Composition	Preludio	Semifinal	Finalist TBA
2020	19th UKSC Music Contest (United Kingdom)	Instrumental	Sandro's Song	Finalist	Finalist TBA February 2021
2020	19th UKSC Music Contest (United Kingdom)	World Music	Coco Loco	Finalist	Finalist TBA February 2021
2020	19th UKSC Music Contest (United Kingdom)	Composizione	Coco Loco	Semifinal	
2020	19th UKSC Music Contest (United Kingdom)	Jazz	Libeccio	Semifinal	
2020	19th UKSC Music Contest (United Kingdom)	Composition	Libeccio	Semifinal	
2020	11th Annual Hollywood Music in Media Awards	Jazz	Libeccio	Nomination	
2023	Global Music Awards	Crossover Jazz Best Album	Under The Leo Sign	Silver Medal	
2025	Hollywood Independent Music Awards	Jazz (Smooth/Cool)	Lightness	Winner	announced on July 30, 2025
2025	Hollywood Independent Music Awards	Latin Traditional	From Rio To São Paulo	Nomination	
2025	Hollywood Independent Music Awards	Holiday	Christmas For Sale	Nomination	

== Bibliography and further reading ==
- 2002: Time in Jazz - Various Authors (publisher: Taphros)
- 2003: Boghes e Sonos - Giacomo Serreli (publisher: Scuola Sarda, 2003 - 870 pages)
- 2011: Time After Time - Vincenzo Martorella (publisher: Magnum edizioni, 2011)
- 2020 - Vintage - Riccardo Frau (publisher: Alfa Editrice, 2020)
