= Fusion Orchestra =

British musical group

- Origin: London, England
- Genres: Progressive rock
- Years active: 1969–1975; 2013 (as Fusion Orchestra 2)
- Labels: EMI
- Past members: Dave Bell; Dave Cowell; Colin Dawson; Stan Land; Jill Saward; See also: Personnel
- Website: FusionOrchestra.com; FusionOrchestra2.com

Fusion Orchestra was a British progressive rock band active between 1969 and 1975.

== History ==
The band was formed in 1969 by Dave Bell, Stan Land, and Colin Dawson, but the more recognisable incarnation was formed when Jill Saward joined on vocals in 1970. They performed regularly on the British club circuit in the early 1970s, clocking up over 500 gigs at venues such as the Marquee Club before they eventually split in 1975. Their live performances were flamboyant and Saward's reputation for erotically charged on-stage antics drew both positive and negative publicity.

In 1973, the band were signed by EMI, and released their only album Skeleton in Armour. It contained four long and complex pieces in a progressive rock vein and a shorter single, "When My Mama's Not at Home", together with four short interlude tracks.

The band continued touring, but 1974 saw a series of line-up changes, and eventually lead guitarist and founding member Colin Dawson quit the band at the end of that year. The guitar duties were taken over by Alan Murphy, who subsequently played with Go West and Level 42. He played with the band until their final split in mid 1975. Saward sang in several bands and later went on to join Shakatak, with whom she still records and tours.

Colin Dawson and a new line-up (Fusion Orchestra 2) released a new album in 2013 called Casting Shadows.

== Personnel ==
=== Skeleton in Armour (1973) ===
- Jill Saward – vocals, keyboards, flute (1970–1975)
- Colin Dawson – lead guitar (1969–1974)
- Stan Land – rhythm guitar (1969–1974)
- Dave Cowell – bass (1972–1973)
- Dave Bell – drums (1969–1975)

=== Other members ===
- Mick Sluman – bass (1969–1972)
- Paul Jennings – bass (1973–1975)
- Martin Slavinec – keyboards (1974)
- Andy Blamire – rhythm guitar (1974)
- Alan Murphy – lead guitar (1975)

== Discography ==
- Skeleton in Armour (EMI, 1973)
1. "Fanfairy Suite for 1,000 Trampits (Part One)"
2. "Sonata in Z"
3. "Have I Left the Gas On?"
4. "OK Boys, Now's Our Big Chance"
5. "Skeleton in Armour"
6. "When My Mama's Not at Home"
7. "Don't Be Silly, Jilly"
8. "Talk to the Man in the Sky"
9. "Fanfairy Suite for 1,000 Trampits (Part Two)"

Recorded at Abbey Road Studios, London June–July 1973

- Live at the Marquee 1974 (Secret Records Limited, 2018)
1. "Beginning End"
2. "Sister Reno"
3. "Talk to the Man in the Sky"
4. "To a Child"
5. "Set in the Rock
6. "Spinedance + drum solo"
7. "Skeleton in Armour"
8. "Ticket to Ride"
9. "Whole Lotta Shakin'"

Official Bootleg Series – Unreleased live concert Marquee Club 1974.

== Fusion Orchestra 2 ==
=== Personnel ===
- Elsie Lovelock – vocals
- Colin Dawson – guitar
- Ben Bell – keyboards
- Shemeck Fraczek – bass
- Seex Dyer – drums

=== Discography ===
- Casting Shadows (Patchwork Studios (UK), 2013)
1. "Don't Forget Your Keys"
2. "Leaving It All Behind"
3. "Troubled Dreams and Fairy Queens"
4. "Cider Sue"
5. "See What We Left Behind?"
6. "Secret Shadow"
7. "Unseen, Unheard, Unfinished"
