= Night Birds (album) =

Studio album by Shakatak
- Released: May 1982
- Studio: Jacobs Studios (Surrey); Pye Studio II (London)
- Genre: Jazz-funk, crossover
- Length: 43:32
- Label: Polydor
- Producer: Nigel Wright

Shakatak chronology
Drivin' Hard (1981)	Night Birds (1982)	Invitations (1982)

Professional ratings
Review scores
Source	Rating
AllMusic	3.5/5 stars

Night Birds, released in 1982 on the Polydor label, is the second album by English jazz-funk band Shakatak. Night Birds established Shakatak's trademark jazz-funk sound, and contains two of the band's biggest hits, "Easier Said than Done" and "Night Birds", the former reaching the No. 12 spot in 1981, the latter climbing to No. 9 in the following year.

== Track listing ==
- All tracks written by William "Bill" Sharpe and Roger Odell except where indicated.

Side 1:

1. "Night Birds" – 6:25
2. "Streetwalkin'" – 5:30
3. "Rio Nights" – 5:18
4. "Fly the Wind" – 4:20

Side 2:

1. "Easier Said Than Done" – 6:10
2. "Bitch to the Boys" – 6:28
3. "Light on My Life" – 4:48
4. "Takin' Off" (William "Bill" Sharpe) – 5:08
- Produced by Nigel Wright.

== Charts ==
Chart (1982/83)	Peak position
Australia (Kent Music Report)	52
New Zealand (Recorded Music NZ)	35
United Kingdom (Official Charts Company)	4

== Personnel ==
- Bill Sharpe – Bösendorfer grand piano, Fender Rhodes electric piano; Oberheim OB-X synthesizer, ARP Odyssey and Prophet-10 synthesisers
- Nigel Wright – Fender Rhodes electric piano, Oberheim OB-X & Prophet-10 synthesisers, trombone, brass arrangements
- Keith Winter – Yamaha SG2000 & Gibson ES-345 electric guitars, Ovation acoustic guitar; Mesa Boogie amplification and Custom Pedal Board
- George Anderson – Music Man StingRay and G&L 2000E electric basses
- Roger Odell – Sonor drums, Avedis Zildjian cymbals
- Jill Saward – vocals
- Jackie Rawe – vocals (also lead vocal on "Streetwalkin'")

Additional personnel

- Vocals by Lorna Bannon; lead vocal on "Light on My Life"
- Percussion, Portuguese translation and vocal on "Rio Nights" by Simon Morton
- Trumpet by Stuart Brooks
- Saxophone solos on "Streetwalkin'" and "Light on My Life" by Dick Morrissey (courtesy of Beggars Banquet)
