= Mirage (medley group) =

British pop music group of the 1980s

- Genres: Dance-pop
- Years active: 1983–1993
- Past members: Leroy Osbourne; Roy Gayle; Tracey Ackerman

Mirage were a British dance/pop group active in the 1980s and specializing in medleys. They scored a string of hit singles and albums, and achieved particular success in 1987-8 with the "Jack Mix" series.

== History ==
Mirage had its origins in Enigma, a 1981 project created by Shakatak producer Nigel Wright to cash in on the success of Dutch medley group Stars on 45. Enigma's "Ain't No Stopping", a medley of disco hits played by session musicians, was released while "Stars on 45" was still climbing the charts. "Ain't No Stopping" peaked at number 11 on the UK Singles Chart and was followed up with "I Love Music", which peaked at number 25.

Although the medley craze faded quickly, Wright continued to produce medleys, first under the name Mojo, before settling on Mirage.

The first Mirage medley to make an impact was the 1984 release "Give Me the Night", a medley of George Benson songs sung by Leroy Osbourne (of Sade) under the guise of Roy Gayle. Other single-artist medleys followed: "Let's Groove" (Earth, Wind and Fire), "Get Down on It" (Kool and the Gang) and the Tracey Ackerman-fronted "Into the Groove Medley" (Madonna). Though popular in UK clubs, only "Give Me the Night" crossed over into the mainstream charts.

=== "Jack Mix" series ===
Mirage came to much greater prominence in 1987 when Wright spotted an opportunity in the new house music style which was beginning to enter the mainstream. In January 1987, Steve "Silk" Hurley achieved the first house music number one hit in the UK with "Jack Your Body". Wright quickly responded by releasing the 12" single "Jack Mix" under the Mirage name - a medley/montage of "Jack Your Body", "Showing Out (Get Fresh at the Weekend)" and "Axel F". Following positive response from the clubs, an expanded version was released, titled "Jack Mix II". This became the first UK-produced house record to reach the British top ten, peaking at number 4.

Unlike most medleys, which typically used sections of individual songs presented sequentially with brief transitions between them, the "Jack Mix" series took a different approach, layering elements of different songs to produce a dense montage effect similar to a mashup.

Despite being reliant entirely on medleys of other people's material, Mirage was one of the most successful house acts in 1987-8, placing several more singles on the charts, including the number 8 hit "Jack Mix IV". Several TV advertised albums also charted, with the most successful being Jack Mix '88 (actually released in 1987) and Jack Mix in Full Effect, both of which reached number 7.

Mirage's popularity faded in 1988, as a large number of British house music acts started to produce original material and sample-based records using the original recordings rather than session remakes.

== Discography ==
=== Albums ===
Year	Album	UK	Certifications
1987	Jack Mix	—	
1987	Mix '87 (87 Hits of '87)	—	
1987	The Best of Mirage: Jack Mix '88	7	BPI: Silver
1988	Jack Mix in Full Effect	7	BPI: Gold
1988	Dance Masters	—	
1989	Royal Mix '89	34	
1990	Latino House	—	
"—" denotes releases that did not chart.

=== Singles ===
Year	Song	UK
1984	"Give Me the Night"	49
1984	"Let's Groove (Medley)"	81
1985	"Into the Groove (Medley)"	87
1985	"Drugbustin' Music"	—
1985	"Get Down on It"	—
1987	"Jack Mix"	91
1987	"Jack Mix II/III"	4
1987	"Serious Mix"	42
1987	"Jack Mix IV"	8
1988	"Jack Mix V"	—
1988	"Jack Mix VII"	50
1988	"Pushing the Beat"	67
1988	"Pebble Mix"	—
1989	"House Attack"	84
1989	"Latino House"	70
1991	"Everybody Dance Now!"	—
1993	"Reach for Your Dreams"	—
"—" denotes releases that did not chart.
