= Creole Records =

Defunct British record label

- Founded: 1965
- Status: Defunct
- Genre: Disco, reggae
- Country of origin: UK

1983 12" single on UK label Creole Records.

Creole Records was a UK record label that found most of its success in the disco and reggae genres in the mid-1970s to early 1980s.

Bruce White and Tony Cousins, who used the collective pseudonym Bruce Anthony, originally set up Commercial Entertainments in 1965 as a booking and management agency. Ska singer Desmond Dekker, roots reggae and Rastafari artists Max Romeo, the Ethiopians, and many other Jamaican groups and artists were handled by the agency who were joined by Dick Mills as a booker. They first released records on the Creole label, established as a subsidiary of Trojan Records, in 1971, and started a new Creole label in 1975.

Creole released the debut singles of both Boney M. ("Baby Do You Wanna Bump") and Amanda Lear ("Trouble") in 1975. Other artists included Lovers Rock and Roots singer Sugar Minott, hornsman Jo Jo Bennett ("Leaving Rome"), Ruby Winters, Peter Green, Liquid Gold ("Dance Yourself Dizzy"), Maxine Singleton, Ken Gold, Danish reggae band Laid Back ("Sunshine Reggae") Chubby Checker, Sylvester, The Upsetters and Studio One player, Boris Gardiner, Frankie Vaughan, City 19 and Enigma who had a hit in 1981 with "Ain't No Stoppin' Us Now".

The company was bought by Rod Smallwood and Andy Taylor's Sanctuary Records Group in 2003, now owned by BMG Rights Management.

== See also ==
- List of record labels
