= Down on the Street =

Single by Shakatak

from the album Down on the Street
- B-side: "Holding On", "Dark Is the Night"
- Released: 6 July 1984
- Recorded: 1984
- Genre: Jazz-funk
- Length: 3:16
- Label: Polydor, PolyGram
- Songwriter(s): Bill Sharpe, Roger Odell
- Producer(s): Nigel Wright, Les McCutcheon

Shakatak singles chronology
"If You Could See Me Now" (1983)	"Down on the Street" (1984)	"Don't Blame It on Love" (1984)

"Down on the Street" is a 1984 song by British band Shakatak. The song is about the joy of nightlife. It was a hit, reaching No. 9 in the UK.

It was their only chart entry on the U.S. Dance Charts, with no further hits there, although their duet with Al Jarreau on "Day by Day" in 1985 was a mild success.

Shakatak also reworked the song for the opening titles of 1986 BBC Education series You Are What You Eat.

== Track listing ==
7" single

1. "Down on the Street" 3:16
2. "Holding On" 4:35

12" single

1. "Down on the Street" 6:48
2. "Dark Is the Night" 6:05

== Charts ==
Chart (1984/85)	Peak position
U.S. Billboard Dance Club Songs	27
UK Singles Chart	9
German Singles Chart	17
Dutch Top 40	31
French Singles Chart	25
