= Tracy Ackerman =

British singer and songwriter

Tracy Ackerman is a British singer and songwriter. She works with several other British songwriters including Andy Watkins and Paul Wilson of Absolute and Mark Taylor. Ackerman has written for artists including Geri Halliwell, Cher, Boyzone, Tina Turner, Will Young and Steps.

== Early life and education ==
Ackerman attended Gordano School.

== Career ==
In the 1980s she was used as a vocalist by record producer Nigel Wright on many of his megamix-styled medley projects. Originally projects like Enigma and This Year's Blonde were set up as rivals to the success of Jaap Eggermont's Starsound/Stars on 45, though in the late 1980s Wright increasingly targeted the house scene with 'Jack Mix' act Mirage (with Mirage including a co-credit for Ackerman on their pre-house 1985 medley "Into the Groove"). Other 1980s work included touring with Dead or Alive, singing lead on "Ice" from Rick Wakeman's 1988 solo album Time Machine, backing vocals on some of Shakatak's albums and performing backing vocals during Eric Clapton's 1988 anniversary tour. On Clapton's tour, she performed alongside Tessa Niles, a vocalist who she has sung backing vocals with on various albums by Gary Numan.

She has recorded several of her own tracks and had a couple of hit singles in the 1990s when she was the featured credited vocalist on a number of dance cover versions. Her biggest hit as a featured vocalist was on a version of Minnie Riperton's "Loving You", which got to No. 25 in 1990 (credited to Massivo ft Tracy and released on Debut Records), whilst a cover of the Brenda Russell's hit, "Get Here". was a No. 37 hit in 1993 (with an act called Q taking the main credit). She also featured on a track by The Space Brothers' alter ego Lustral called "Everytime", a club hit that never really crossed over into the mainstream but spent one week at No. 30 in 1999. She had also toured with Boyzone in the 1990s and was a vocalist for Almighty Records' Hi-NRG ABBA covers project Abbacadabra, alongside other singers such as Karen Boddington, Belle Lawrence and Martin Jenkins.

== Personal life ==
Ackerman lives in Berkshire and is married to property developer Steve Bromwich.

== Songs co-written by Ackerman ==
- allSTARS*: "Tearing Up the World" (co-written with Ray Hedges and Nigel Butler) from the album allSTARS* (2002)
- Andy Abraham: "Hang Up" (co-written with Absolute) from the CD Impossible Dream (2006)
- B*Witched: "C'est La Vie", "Rev It Up", "Rollercoaster", "Blame It On The Weatherman", "Freak Out" (all co-written with Ray Hedges and Martin Brannigan) from the CD B*Witched (1999)
- B*Witched: "Never Giving Up" (co-written with Andy Hill) from the CD B*Witched (1999)
- Boyzone: "Will I Ever See You" (co-written with Absolute), B-side of "Every Day I Love You More" (1999)
- Celine Dion: "Ain't Gonna Look The Other Way" or the changed title "I Choose life" from the CD A New Day.. Live in Las Vegas (2004)
- Cher: "Alive Again" (N Bracegirdle/R Hedges/T Ackerman) from Living Proof (2002)
- Chicane: "Locking Down" (1997), "Daylight" (2008) and "Spirit" (2007)
- Dana Dawson: "Got To Give Me Love" (1996)
- Dannii Minogue: "Get Into You" (1993)
- Darius: "Resolution" from the CD Live Twice (2004)
- Edyta Górniak: Impossible, Sit Down, Invisible, How Do You Know, The Story So Far, The Day Before The Rain, Cross My Heart and Make It Happen from the CD Invisible (2003)
- Erik: We Got The Love (1994)
- Eternal: "Sensual Man" from the CD Eternal (1999)
- Geri Halliwell: "Walkaway" and "Someone's Watching Over Me" (co-written with Absolute) from the CD Schizophonic (1999)
- Geri Halliwell: "Feels Like Sex", "Circles Round The Moon" and "Lovey Dovey Stuff" (co-written with Absolute) from the CD Scream If You Wanna Go Faster (2001)
- Geri Halliwell: "Don't Get Any Better" (co-written with Absolute) from the CD Passion (2005)
- Gil Ofarim: "Never Giving Up Now" (written with Andy Hill) from 1998
- Girl Thing: "Girls On Top" and "Shhh" (co-written with Absolute) (2000)
- Hear'Say: "Straight From The Heart" (T Hawes/P Kirtley/T Ackerman) from the CD Everybody (2001)
- Hear'Say: "Carried Away" and "Sweet Alibi" (co-written with Ray Hedges) from the CD Popstars (2001)
- Jamie Scott: "When Will I See Your Face Again" and "Rise Up" from the CD Park Bench Theories (2007)
- Judy Cheeks: "This Time" (J Douglas/T Ackerman) and "Forgive and Forget" from the CD Respect (1996)
- Keisha White: "Ain't Gonna Look The Other Way" and "Don't Mistake Me"
- Kim Wilde: Breakin' Away from the CD Now & Forever (1995)
- Kylie Minogue: Love is Waiting from the CD Confide in Me: The Irresistible Kylie (2007)
- Lindy Layton: "We Got The Love" (McCutcheon / T Ackerman) (1993)
- No Angels: "Ain't Gonna Look The Other Way" from the CD Destiny Reloaded (2008)
- Q featuring Tracy Ackerman: "I Wish" (M Taylor / T Ackerman), B-side of "Get Here" (Single) (1993)
- Q featuring Tony Jackson: "Everlasting" (M Taylor / T Ackerman), B-side of "(Everything I Do) I Do It For You" (1994)
- Rozalla: "All That I Need" from the CD Look No Further (1995)
- S Club 7: "Bring The House Down" and "Cross My Heart" (co-written with Absolute) from the CD 7 (2000)
- S Club: "Gansta Love" and "In Too Deep" from the CD Seeing Double (2002)
- S Club Juniors: "I Come Alive" (co-written with Absolute) from the CD Together (2002)
- Sonia: "My Light" (M Taylor / T Ackerman / S Evans), B-side of "Boogie Nights" (1992)
- Taylor Hicks: "Do I Make You Proud" (co-written with Absolute) from the CD Taylor Hicks (2006)
- Tina Turner: "All The Woman" (co-written with Absolute) from the CD Twenty Four Seven (1999)
- Will Young: "If That's What You Want" (co-written with Absolute), B-side of "Don't Let Me Down" (2002)

== This Year's Blonde ==
The first medley by This Year's Blonde to hit the charts was "Platinum Pop", which reached No. 46 in 1981. This track was a medley of songs made famous by Blondie and included "Hanging on the Telephone", "Denis", "Dreaming", "Union City Blues", "(I'm Always Touched) By Your Presence Dear", "Sunday Girl" and "Dreaming". Their second record was a medley of songs by Madonna with "Who's That Girl", "La Isla Bonita", "Open Your Heart", "Lucky Star", "Holiday", "Into the Groove" and "Papa Don't Preach" being covered. Titled "Who's That Mix", the record released by Debut Records charted at No. 62 in 1987.
