= Jill Saward (singer) =

British singer, musician and composer (born 1953)

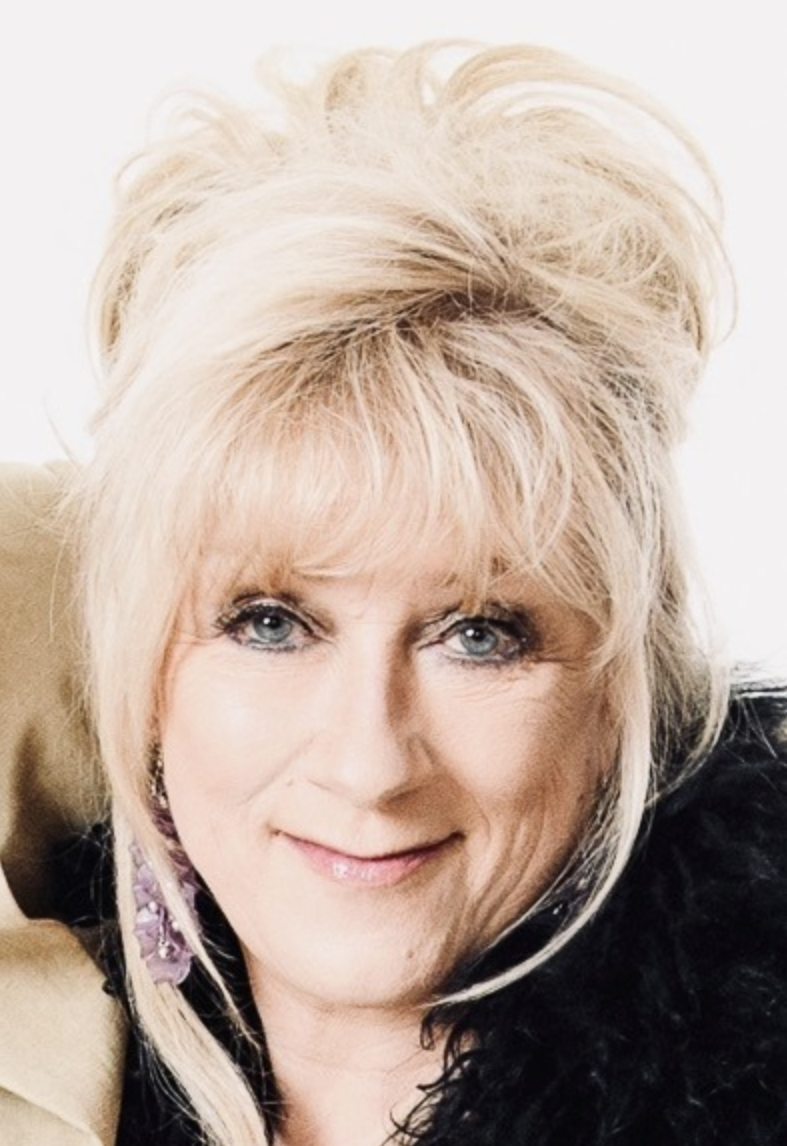

Background information
- Born: 9 December 1953 (age 72); Tooting, London, England
- Genres: Jazz; funk; pop
- Occupations: Musician; singer-songwriter
- Instruments: Vocal; flute; percussion
- Years active: 1969–present
- Label: Secret
- Website: Official website

Jill Saward (born 9 December 1953) is a British singer, musician and composer, best known for being the lead voice of the English jazz-funk band, Shakatak. She recorded "Day by Day" with Al Jarreau in 1985.

== Career ==
Prior to starting her music career, Saward was a shorthand typist.

=== Fusion Orchestra ===
Saward performed with the British progressive jazz rock band Fusion Orchestra, from 1969 to 1975. She wrote the music and sang.

Having gained a following of fans, the Fusion Orchestra secured a record deal with EMI, producing their first album Skeleton in Armour. It received critical acclaim upon its debut and is now a collector's item. After Fusion Orchestra split in 1975, Saward became involved in a new all-female group, Brandy, produced by Polydor, it was active for around three years, before disbanding in 1976.

=== Cats Whiskers and Citizen Gang ===
Saward was spotted by band leader Nicky North who invited her to perform in the big soul funk band, Cats Whiskers. She also worked as a session singer. Saward also had a brief stint with an all-female musical group, Citizen Gang and collaborated with the Nicky North Band.

=== Shakatak ===
It was in this period that she met Nigel Wright and Roger Odell, who are still components of the jazz-funk band Shakatak.

It was through Shakatak that Saward was able to record some vocals on an experimental track of a song called "Steppin'", and after nine top ten hits Saward was invited to be a permanent part of the group and started to tour worldwide.

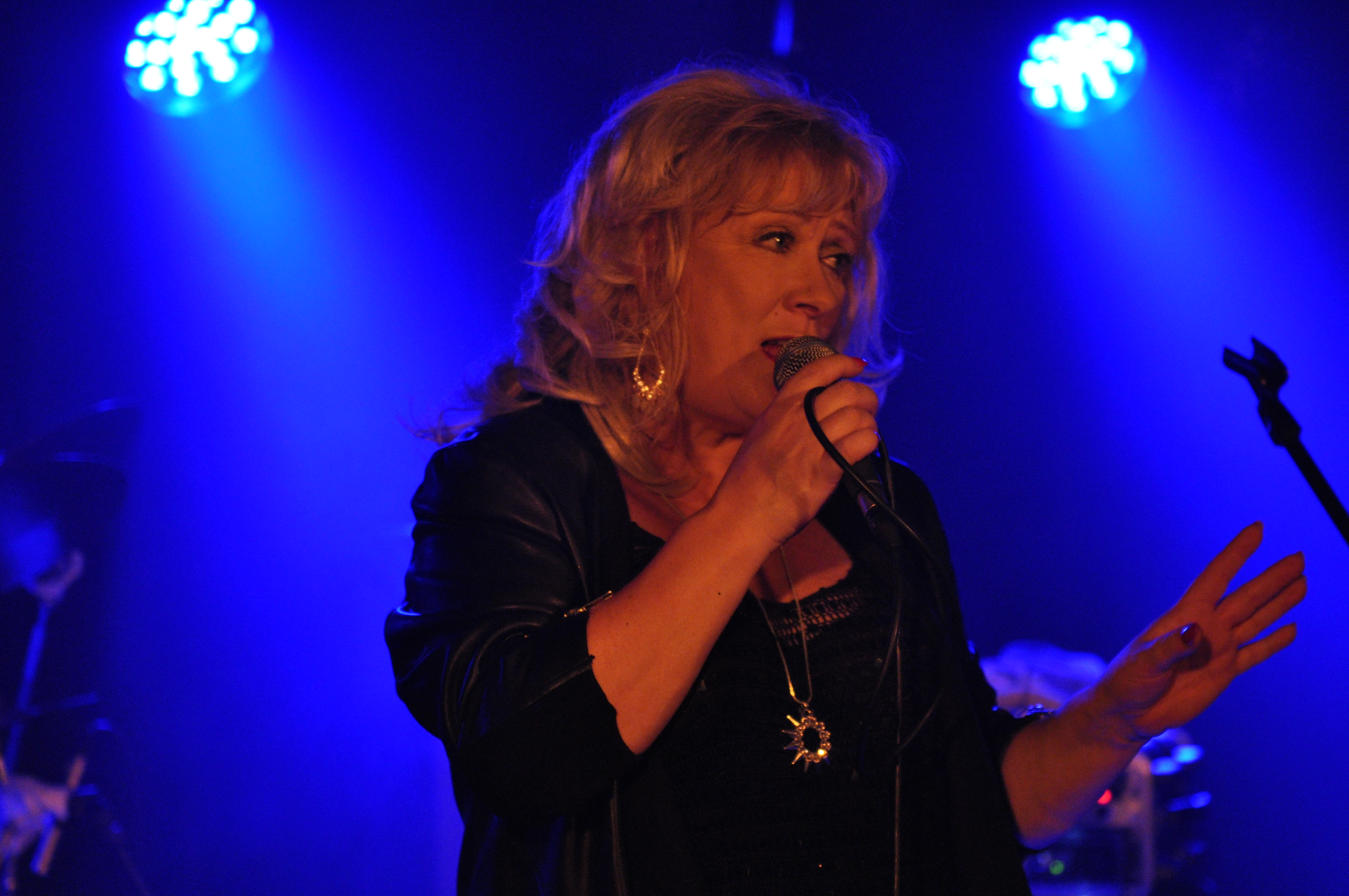
Saward in 2014 in concert with Shakatak

She has been lead singer for Shakatak for over 35 years. The band is still touring and recording and still popular around the world, especially in Europe and the Far East. They usually publish a new album every two years for JVC Records and Secret Records.

Outside of Shakatak, Saward has developed new projects, and still continues to write and record new material.

In 2008 Saward starred in Living TV's Pop Goes The Band, a reality TV show which saw former musical stars from bands including Bucks Fizz, Bananarama, Visage, Cleopatra, 911 and Chaka Khan, undergo surgery in a bid to relaunch their careers.

== Personal life ==
Saward was married to Shakatak's bass player George Anderson, with whom she had two sons. They divorced in 2001. She moved to Italy in 2008.

== Discography ==
With Shakatak, Saward has recorded over thirty albums and released 26 singles including: Drivin' Hard (1981), Night Birds (1982) and Out of This World (1983).

Other recordings have included:

Year	Album	Notes
1973	Skeleton in Armour	with Fusion Orchestra
1977	Ooh Ya'	with Brandy
1979	Citizen Gang	with Citizen Gang
1979	Womanly Way	with Citizen Gang
1999	Just for You	Solo album
2016	Just for You	Solo album, remastered
2016	M Is for Manhattan	Solo album
2016	Endless Summer	Solo album

== Videos ==
- 1984: Twilight Sensation [Laserdisc]
- 1986: The Purely Music Concert Series [Laserdisc]
- 2004: Live at the Playhouse [DVD]
- 2004: In Concert [DVD]
- 2005: Live at Duo Music Exchange [DVD]
