= Nigel Wright (music producer) =

English record producer (born 1955)

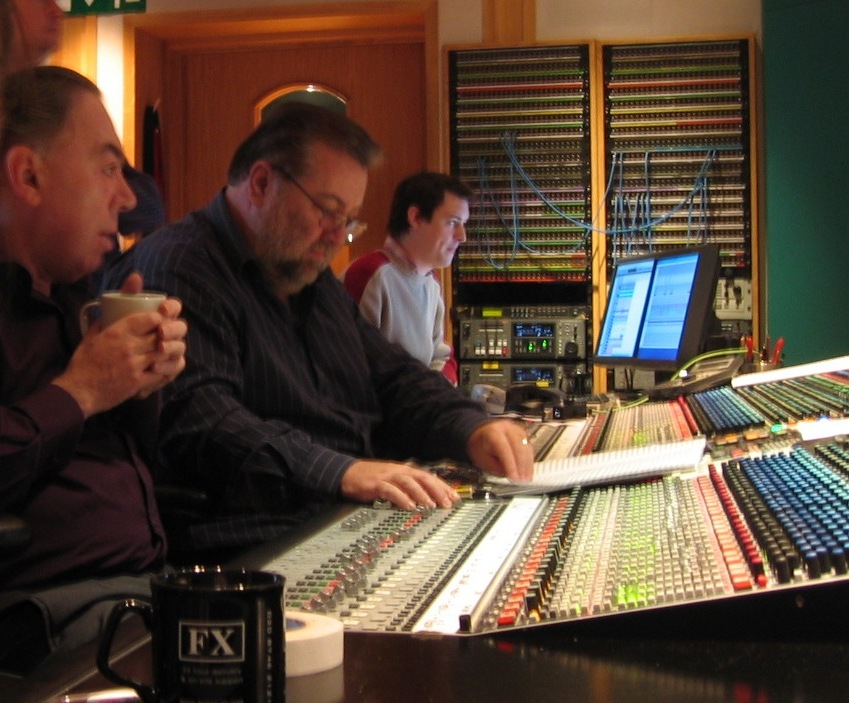
Nigel Wright (centre) working with Andrew Lloyd Webber in a recording studio

Nigel Wright (born 13 June 1955, in Bristol) is a record producer from England. His career as music producer, orchestrator and songwriter has scored five number one singles, 31 Top 20 singles and a string of platinum albums with recording artists as diverse as Madonna, Shakatak, Mezzoforte, Barbra Streisand, Boyzone, Sonia, Take That, Sinitta, José Carreras, Robson & Jerome, Michael Ball, Sarah Brightman, The Texas Tenors, Cliff Richard, Connie Fisher, Paul Potts, Andy Abraham and Ray Quinn.

Wright's career in theatre and film include serving as the music producer for Andrew Lloyd Webber, in a successful partnership that had, as of May 2009, lasted more than eighteen years.

== Record production ==
Wright first rose to prominence as producer of the jazz-funk group Shakatak. During the 1980s, he also produced medleys under various names. In 1981, Wright created "Ain't No Stopping", a rapid response to the success of Stars on 45 consisting of parts of recent disco hits and taking its name from McFadden & Whitehead's "Ain't No Stoppin' Us Now" which began and ended the medley. Released under the group name Enigma, it reached number 11 in the UK Singles Chart and was followed by "I Love Music" which reached number 25.

Through the 1980s, Wright continued to produce medleys under other names including This Year's Blonde, Mojo, and Mirage. Under the latter name, he created the popular "Jack Mix" series of medleys which included the 1987 top ten hit singles "Jack Mix II" (#4) and "Jack Mix IV" (#8) and albums Jack Mix '88 and Jack Mix in Full Effect (both #7). In 1989, he produced Luv's comeback EP For You including Welcome to My Party that charted in the Netherlands and Belgium.

He continued to create medleys into the early 1990s, now under the name UK Mixmasters. Under this title, he produced three UK hit singles, the biggest of these being "The Bare Necessities Megamix", which peaked at No. 14 in 1991.

=== Mirage ===
Mirage was a British pop music group active in the 1980s and specializing in medleys. It achieved particular success in 1987–8 with the "Jack Mix" series of singles and LPs.

Mirage had its origins in Enigma, a 1981 project created by Nigel Wright to cash in on the success of Dutch medley group Stars on 45. Enigma's "Ain't No Stopping", a medley of disco hits played by session musicians, was released while Stars on 45 was still climbing the charts. "Ain't No Stopping" peaked at number 11 in the UK singles chart and was followed up with "I Love Music", which peaked at number 25.

Although the medley craze faded quickly, Wright continued to produce medleys, first under the name Mojo, before settling on Mirage.

The first Mirage medley to make an impact was the 1984 release "Give Me The Night", a medley of George Benson songs sung by Leroy Osbourne (of Sade) under the guise of Roy Gayle. Other single-artist medleys followed: "Let's Groove" (Earth, Wind & Fire), "Get Down on It" (Kool & the Gang) and the Tracy Ackerman-fronted "Into The Groove Medley" (Madonna). Though popular in UK clubs, only "Give Me The Night" crossed over into the mainstream charts.

==== Jack Mix ====
Mirage came to much greater prominence in 1987 when Wright spotted an opportunity in the new house music style which was beginning to enter the mainstream. In January 1987, Steve "Silk" Hurley achieved the first house music number one hit in the UK with "Jack Your Body". Wright quickly responded by releasing the 12" single "Jack Mix" under the Mirage name – a medley/montage of "Jack Your Body", "Showing Out (Get Fresh at the Weekend)" and "Axel F". Following positive response from the clubs, an expanded version was released, titled "Jack Mix II". This became the first UK-produced house record to reach the British top ten, peaking at number 4.

Unlike most medleys, which typically used sections of individual songs presented sequentially with brief transitions between them, the "Jack Mix" series took a different approach, layering elements of different songs to produce a dense montage effect similar to a mashup.

Despite being reliant entirely on medleys of other people's material, Mirage was one of the most successful house acts in 1987–8, placing several more singles on the charts, including the number eight hit "Jack Mix IV". Several TV advertised albums also charted, with the most successful being Jack Mix '88 (actually released in 1987) and Jack Mix in Full Effect, both of which reached number 7.

Mirage's popularity faded in 1988, as a large number of British house music acts started to produce original material and sample-based records using the original recordings rather than session remakes.

==== UK Mixmasters ====
In 1991, Wright started releasing his mega-mixes under the name Mixmasters, scoring a hit for Simon Cowell's BMG subsidiary IQ Records with a mix of songs from the Saturday Night Fever soundtrack. "The Night Fever Megamix" was a medley of tracks such as "Night Fever", "Jive Talkin'" and "Staying Alive" originally performed by the Bee Gees, with Nigel Wright's medley peaking at number 23 in the UK top 40.

As there was already an Italian act trading under the name Mixmaster, Wright decided to amend his megamix act's name to UK Mixmasters for his next medley, a mix of Stock Aiken Waterman productions originally recorded for Kylie Minogue called "The Lucky 7 Megamix". Unlike "The Night Fever Megamix", this record charted outside the top 40 at number 43.

The last UK Mixmasters hit came when Wright teamed up with British comedian Gary Wilmot for a medley featuring songs from the Walt Disney film The Jungle Book. "The Bare Necessities Megamix" was a medley of ""I Wanna Be Like You" and "The Bare Necessities" and reached the top 20 in 1991, peaking at number 14. This chart success gave the record a slot on BBC One's Top of the Pops, with Wilmot featuring in a clip used for the video breakers on the programme originally broadcast on 12 December 1991 and Gary Martin appearing as the vocalist instead of Wilmot, in the studio a week later.

== Productions ==
=== Musical theatre ===
Wright has produced a number of cast recordings. From 1990 until 2018, he co-produced, with the composer, the recordings of all Andrew Lloyd Webber's musicals, including the film versions of Evita and The Phantom of the Opera.

- Joseph and the Amazing Technicolor Dreamcoat: London Revival Cast Recording featuring Jason Donovan and Linzi Hateley (1991)
- Joseph and the Amazing Technicolor Dreamcoat: Canadian Cast Recording featuring Donny Osmond (1992)
- Joseph and the Amazing Technicolor Dreamcoat: US Cast Recording featuring Michael Damian (1993)
- The New Starlight Express featuring Greg Ellis and Reva Rice (1993)
- Sunset Boulevard: World Premiere Recording featuring Patti LuPone and Kevin Anderson (1993)
- Sunset Boulevard: American Premiere Recording featuring Glenn Close and Alan Campbell (1994)
- Jesus Christ Superstar (1996)
- By Jeeves: Original Cast Recording (1996)
- Sunset Boulevard: Original Canadian Cast Recording (1996)
- Whistle Down the Wind: Original Cast Recording featuring Lottie Mayor and Marcus Lovett (1998)
- Saturday Night Fever featuring Adam Garcia and Anita Louise Coombe (1998)
- The Beautiful Game: Original Cast Recording featuring Josie Walker, David Shannon and Hannah Waddingham (2000)
- Jesus Christ Superstar: The New Stage Production Soundtrack (2000)
- The Woman in White: Original Cast Recording (2004)
- The Likes of Us: Live from the Sydmonton Festival (2005)
- The Sound of Music featuring Connie Fisher (2006)
- Evita: 2006 London Cast Recording (2006)
- Grease (2007)
- Love Never Dies (2010)
- The Phantom of the Opera at the Royal Albert Hall: In Celebration of 25 years (2011)
- Evita: New Broadway Cast Recording (2012)
- Stephen Ward: Original Cast Recording (2013)
- 42nd Street: 2017 London Cast Recording (2017)
- Love Never Dies (2018)
- Company: 2018 London Cast Recording (2018)
- Follies: 2018 National Theatre Cast Recording (2018)
- Jo - The Little Women Musical (2025)

=== Film ===
Produced the soundtrack recordings for a number of films.

- Alan Parker's Evita featuring Madonna and Antonio Banderas (1996) with BAFTA and Oscar nominations for Best Sound
- Cats (Really Useful Films) featuring Elaine Paige, Ken Page and John Mills (1998)
- Joseph and the Amazing Technicolor Dreamcoat (Really Useful Films) featuring Donny Osmond and Maria Friedman (1999)
- Jesus Christ Superstar (Really Useful Films, DVD) starring Jérôme Pradon, Glenn Carter, Renee Castle, Peter Gallagher (2000)
- The Phantom of the Opera featuring Gerard Butler and Emmy Rossum (2004)

== Television ==
At the Eurovision Song Contest, Wright conducted the orchestra for the Icelandic entry "Nei eða já" in 1992 and the United Kingdom entry "Better The Devil You Know" in 1993.

In 2006, Wright was the musical director and arranger for the hit BBC TV show, How Do You Solve A Problem Like Maria? as well as the NBC version, Grease: You're the One that I Want!.

In 2007, he served as musical director for the follow-up to How Do You Solve A Problem Like Maria?, Any Dream Will Do.

In 2008, he was also the musical director for the TV program where a Nancy and Oliver were selected I'd Do Anything and conducted the Orchestra on BBC's Eurovision: Your Country Needs You. He is the musical director of the live heats of The X Factor (ITV), since it began in 2004. He has also worked on many hit American shows, with the latest being America's Got Talent.

== Recent work ==
Wright is currently working on Britain's Got Talent, as well as co-producing Love Never Dies, Andrew Lloyd Webber's sequel to The Phantom of the Opera.

Wright worked on Over the Rainbow as the musical director.
