= Shakatak =

English jazz-funk band

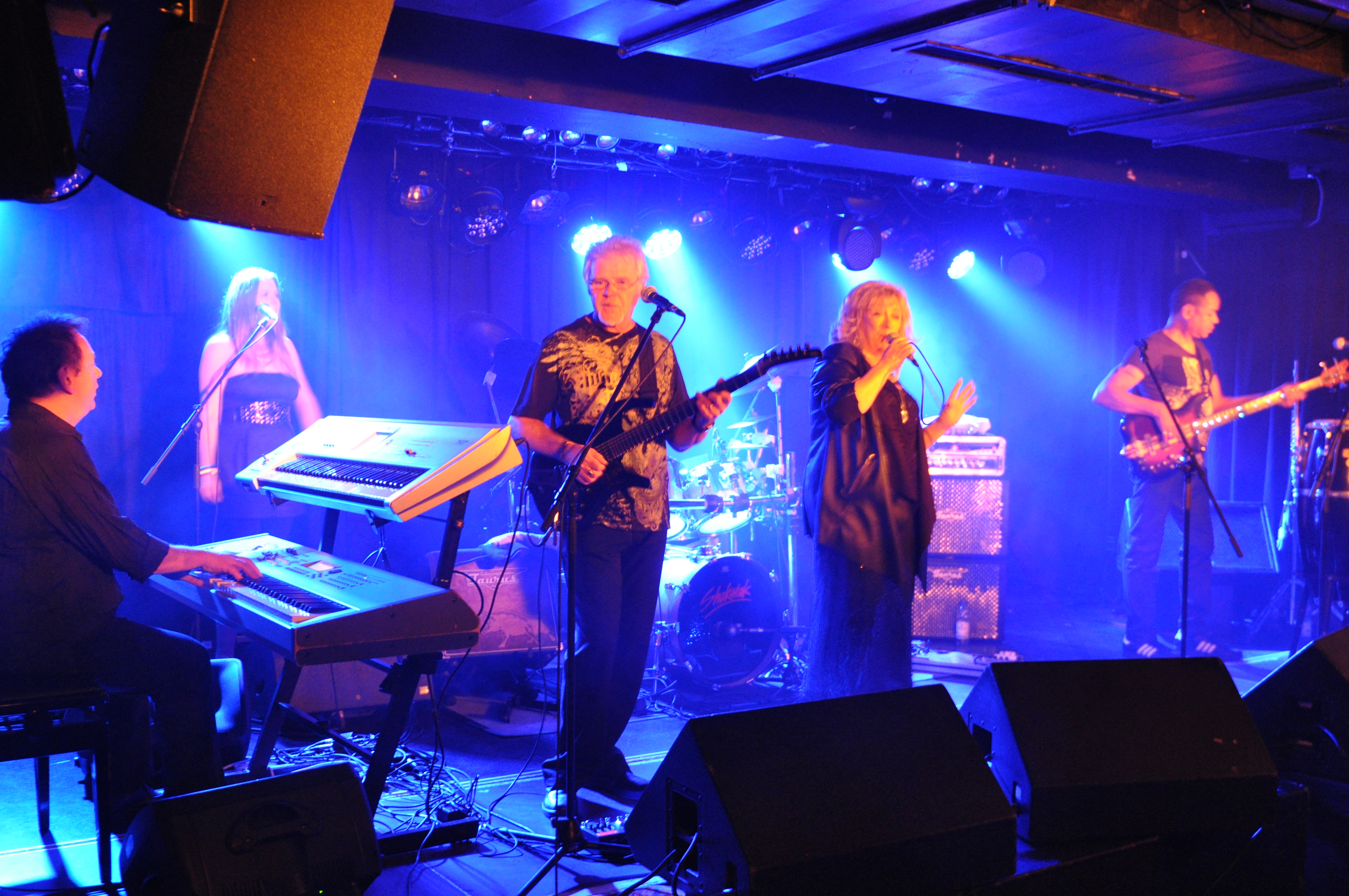
- Shakatak performing at Wuppertal, Germany, 2014

Background information
- Origin: London, England
- Genres: Post-disco; jazz fusion; jazz-funk; R&B; smooth jazz
- Years active: 1980–present
- Labels: Polydor; Secret
- Members: Jill Saward; Bill Sharpe; Roger Odell; George Anderson; Keith Winter
- Past members: Jackie Rawe; Nigel Wright; Steve Underwood; Norma Lewis; Friðrik Karlsson; Alan Wormald
- Website: shakatak.com

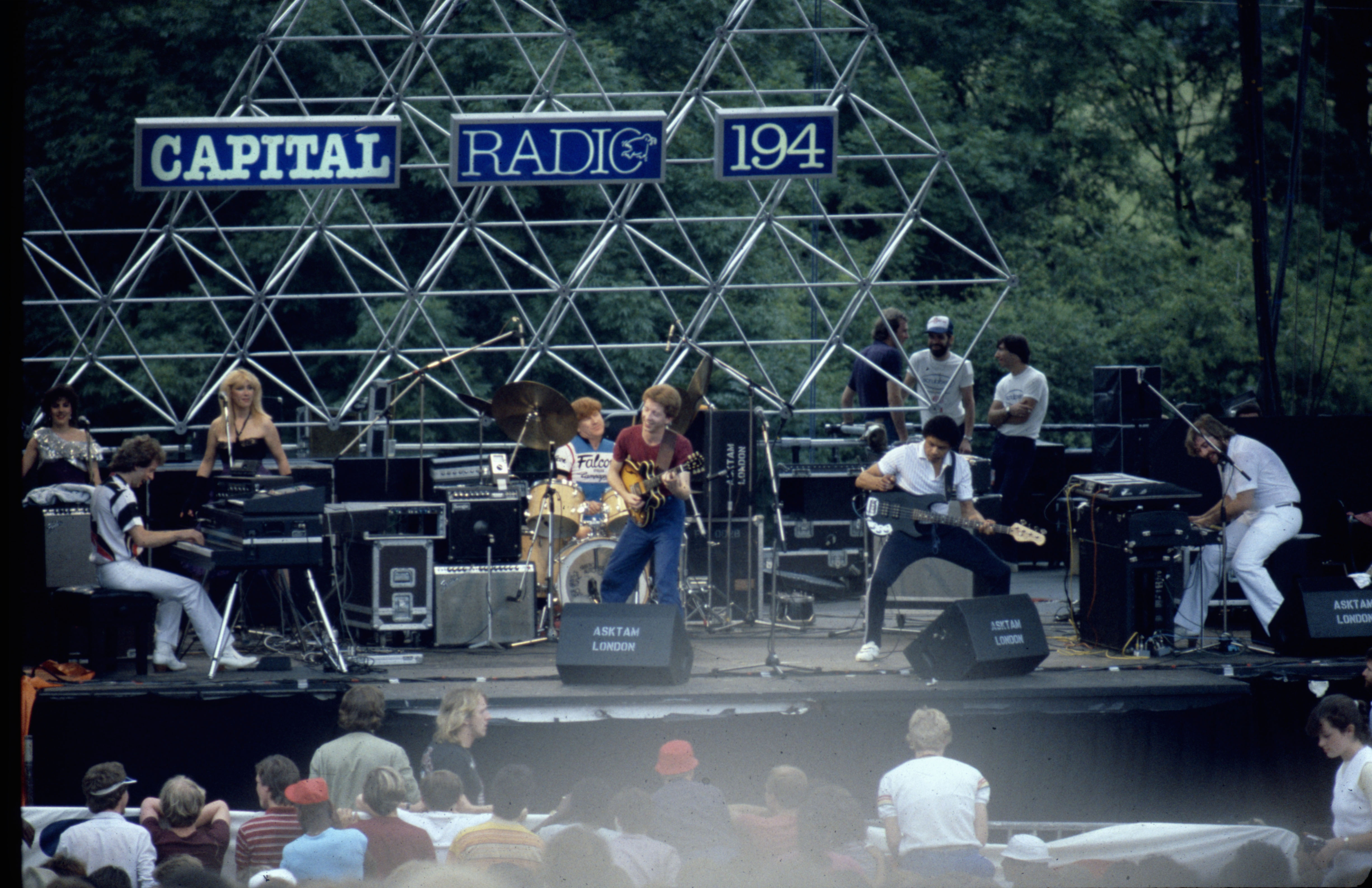
Shakatak performing at Knebworth Park as part of the Capital Radio Jazz Festival, 1982.

Logo

Shakatak is an English jazz-funk band founded in 1980 by Bill Sharpe, Nigel Wright, Roger Odell and Keith Winter. An initial white label release, "Steppin", caught attention by Passion records label owner Les McCutcheon and Northern Soul DJ Kev Roberts. The band's name was created by them and derived from the name of a record store in Soho, London called "Record Shack".

Shakatak scored a number of chart entries, including two Top 10 hits in the UK Singles Chart, "Night Birds" (1982) and "Down on the Street" (1984), plus a further 12 entries in the Guinness Book of British Hit Singles. The group is still active and popular throughout the world, particularly in Japan and the Far East, and generally produce a new album every two years on JVC Records.

== Career ==
It was the release of the 1981 single "Easier Said Than Done" that gave the band the radio exposure needed for their first top-twenty hit. This record introduced their instrumental-unison vocal sound to a much wider audience, and the track stayed in the UK Singles Chart for seventeen weeks. The follow-up, "Night Birds" (1982), was their first single to reach the top ten and it also peaked in Australia at number 92. The album of the same name gave Shakatak their first gold album, entering at number four and remaining in the charts for twenty-eight weeks. Jill Saward (formerly of Fusion Orchestra, Brandy and Citizen Gang) became their sole lead singer to make Shakatak's fifth album, Down on the Street (1984).

The band gained a huge popularity in Japan, where they released a series of largely instrumental albums such as Da Makani (1988) exclusively for the Japanese market. Manic & Cool, featuring the night club and chart hit "Mr Manic & Sister Cool" was released internationally in 1988.

In the 1990s, the band achieved success in the US when their 1992 album Open Your Eyes went to No 1 in the contemporary jazz charts. The 1997 album Full Circle expanded their sound with hip hop-beats.

Still active, the band has released a number of albums in the 2000s and celebrated their thirtieth anniversary year in 2010, marking the occasion with the release of the album Across the World the following year.

Guitarist Alan Wormald died in 2023, and was replaced by returning original guitarist Keith Winter.

== Independent projects ==
Bassist George Anderson released his second solo album, Expressions, on 3 September 2012 through Secret Records. Coming three years after his first 2009 album Positivity, this album again had Anderson writing, arranging and producing all of the tracks. The albums Body and Soul (10 March 2017) and Songs From Tomorrow (5 March 2021) followed, again through Secret Records.

Keyboardist Bill Sharpe teamed up with Gary Numan, billed as Sharpe & Numan, and scored a British Top 20 hit with the single "Change Your Mind" in 1985, and released several other singles with Numan under the Sharp & Numan moniker over the next year.

He later worked with American jazz pianist Don Grusin on a joint project called Geography released in 2007. Sharpe's second collaboration with Grusin, Trans Atlantica, was released on 3 September 2012. It was also issued through Secret Records, and included Geography as a special 2-CD package. On 23 February 2024 Leee John and Bill Sharpe released the album Intimate Glow.

Drummer Roger Odell has released three albums with his band Roger Odell's Beatifik: The Blue Window (2000, Passion Jazz), Intrigue (15 November 2015, Secret Records) and The Long Drive Home (2019, Secret Records as Beatifik). These albums feature Jacqui Hicks (lead vocals), saxophonist Mornington Lockett as well as Roger's wife Larraine Odell (vocals) and son Jamie Odell a.k.a. Jimpster (keyboards, vocals, producer).

== Personnel ==
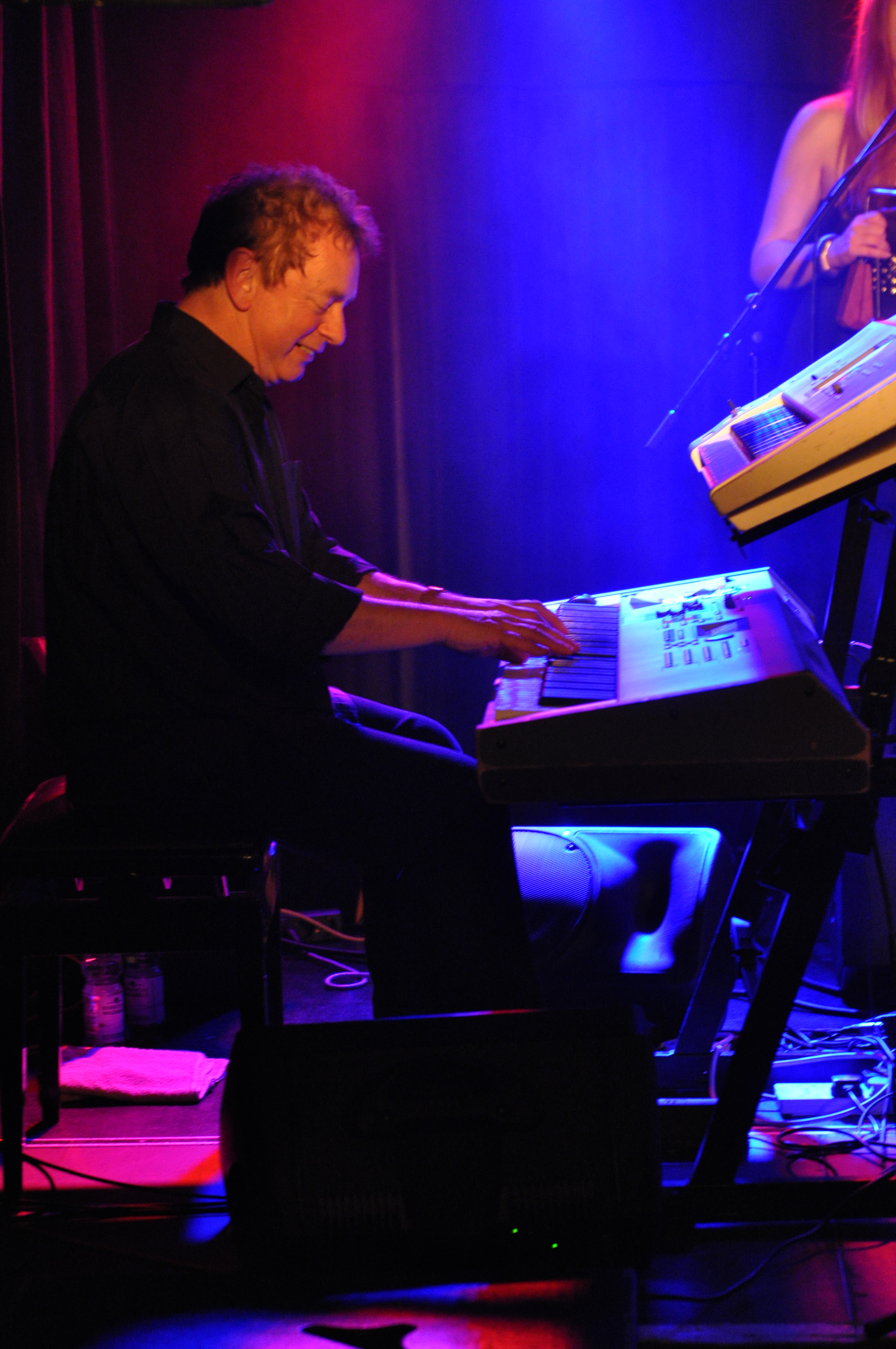
Bill Sharpe

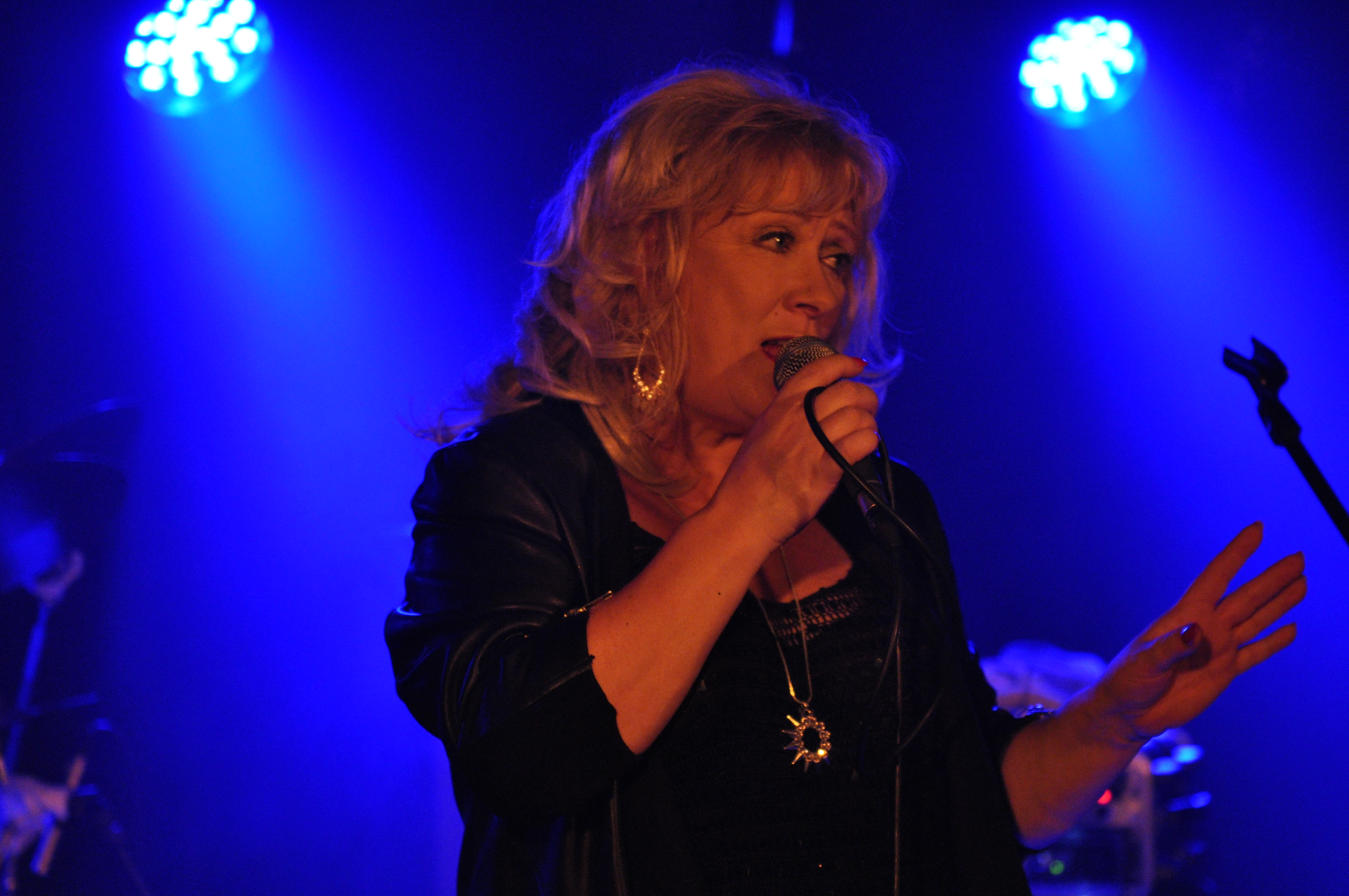
Jill Saward

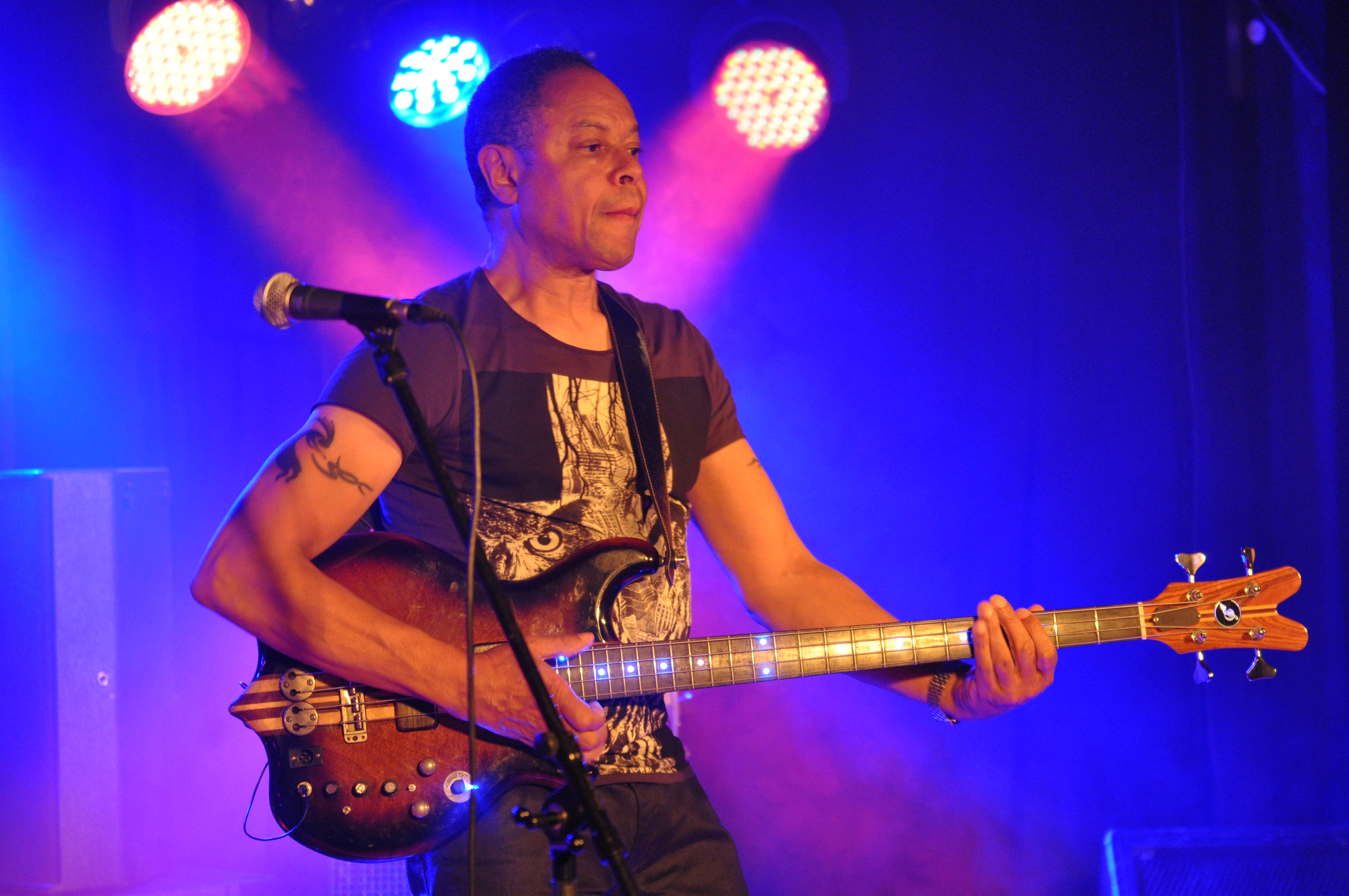
George Anderson

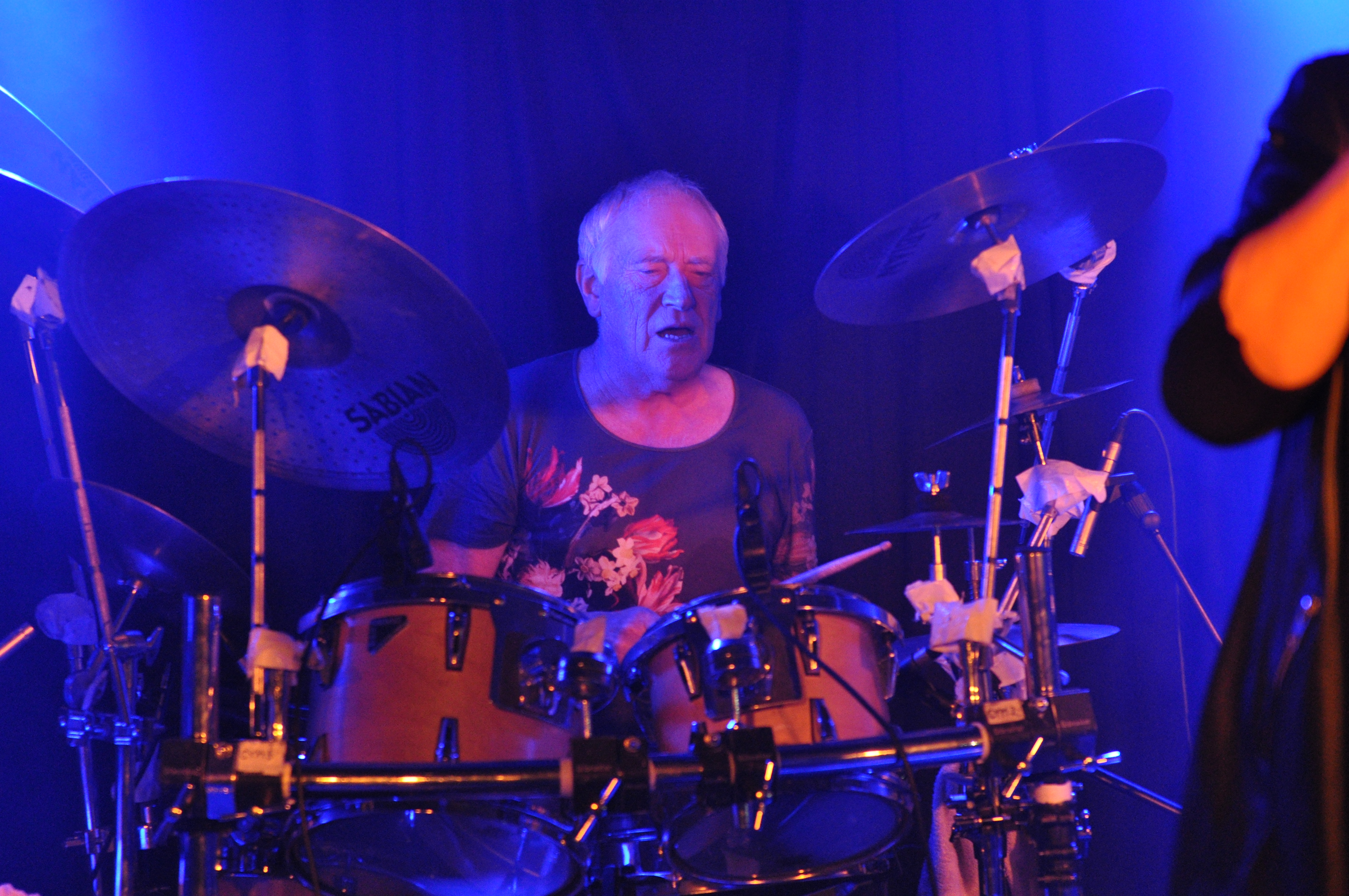
Roger Odell

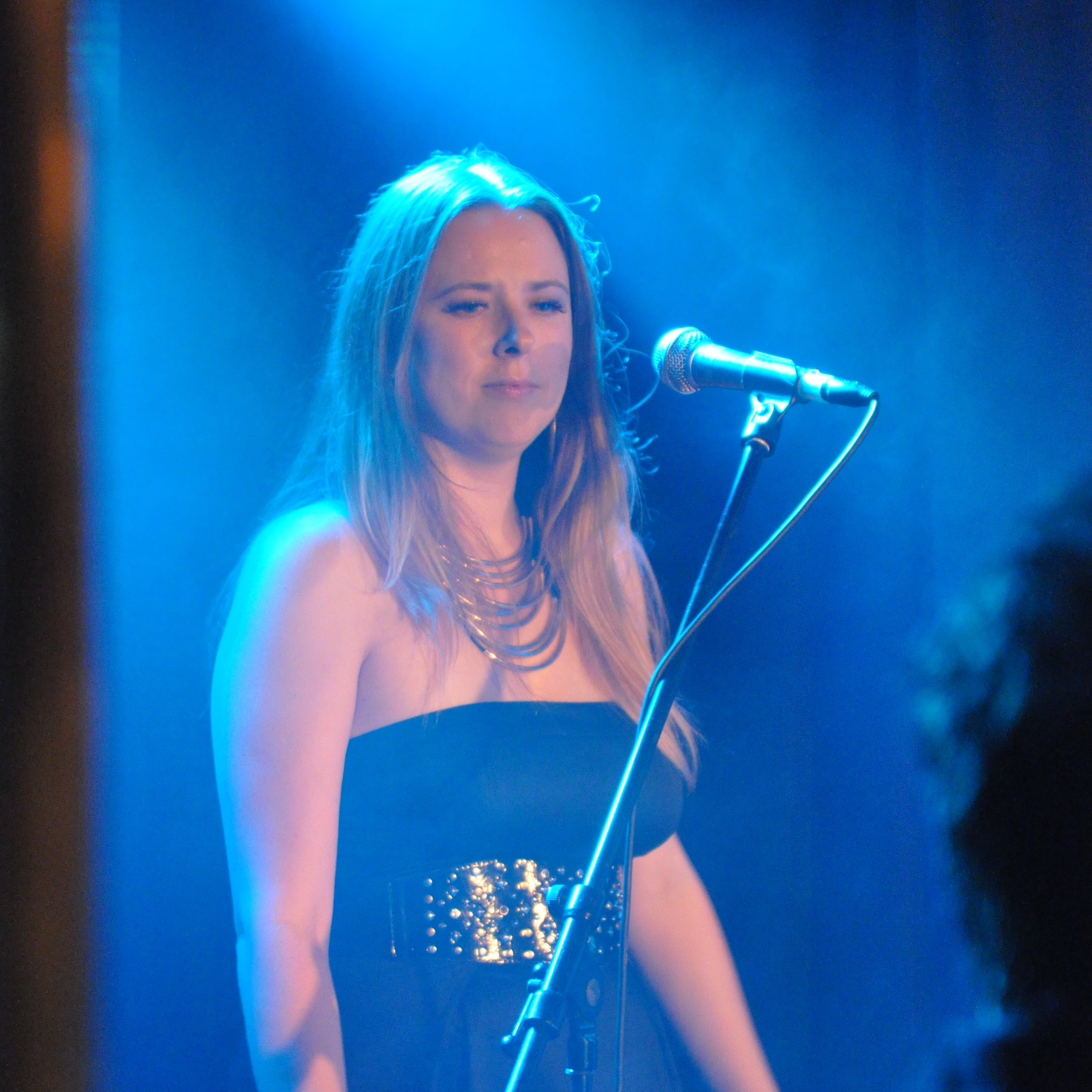
Debby Bracknell (Tour)

Current members

- Jill Saward – vocals, percussion, flute (1980–present)
- Bill Sharpe – keyboards (1980–present)
- Roger Odell – drums (1980–present)
- Keith Winter – guitar, backing vocals (1980–1989, 2023–present)
- George Anderson – bass (1981–present)

Touring musicians

- Jacqui Hicks – backing vocals, sax & flute
- Debby Bracknell – backing vocals, flute

Former members

- Jackie Rawe – vocals (1980–1983)
- Nigel Wright – keyboards (1980–1983)
- Steve Underwood – bass guitar (1980–1981)
- Tracy Ackerman – vocals (1980s–1990s)
- Lorna Bannon – vocals (1982)
- Norma Lewis – vocals (1983)
- Friðrik Karlsson – guitar (1990s–2000s)
- Alan Wormald – guitar (1995-2023; his death)

=== In studio ===
- Dick Morrissey – saxophone
- Mornington Lockett – saxophone
- Derek Nash – saxophone
- Malcolm Tagg-Randall – saxophone
- Fridrik Karlsson – guitar
- Roberto Tola – guitar
- Kazumi Watanabe – guitar

== See also ==
- Jazz fusion
- Level 42
