= Indian Music Industry =

Trust representing the Indian recording industry

- Founded: 28 February 1936
- Location: Mumbai, India
- Key people: Blaise Fernandes, President & CEO
- Website: indianmi.org

The Indian Music Industry (IMI) is a trust that represents the recording industry distributors in India. It was founded on 28 February 1936, as Indian Phonographic Industry (IPI). It is the 2nd oldest music industry organisation in the world that was involved in protecting copyrights of music producers and supporting growth of music entertainment industry. In 1994, it was renamed as Indian Music Industry (IMI) and represented India at the International Federation of the Phonographic Industry (IFPI). It is also registered with the West Bengal Societies Registration Act. All major music labels in India are part of this association.

IMI has its registered office in Kolkata and Administrative office in Mumbai working on the protection of the rights of music producers and preventing music piracy. It has also been instrumental in launching the IMMIES music awards in collaboration with MTV.

The Indian music industry is largely dominated by Indian film soundtracks, which account for nearly 80% of the country's music revenue, followed by Indi-pop. As of 2014, the largest Indian music record label is T-Series with up to 35% share of the Indian market, followed by Sony Music India (the largest foreign-owned label) with up to 25% share, and then Zee Music Company (which has a partnership with Sony). As of 2017, 216 million Indians use music streaming services such as YouTube, Hungama, Gaana and JioSaavn. T-Series has the world's most-viewed and the second most-subscribed YouTube channel.

== History ==
The industry was dominated by cassette tapes in the 1980s and 1990s. In 1990, India had annual cassette sales of 180 million units, including both legitimate and pirate sales. This made it the world's second largest cassette market, after the United States. By 1998, the industry had annual earnings of ₹12 billion ($291 million).

In the early 2000s, 49 million cassettes (including 16 million pirate tapes) were sold every month. Later in the 2000s, the industry transitioned to online streaming, bypassing CD and digital downloads.

== Criteria of certification levels ==
The Indian Music Industry has constituted different, awards to encourage and promote music. The approved scheme of gold/platinum disc standards effective for sound recordings of member companies released in one calendar year is as below:

- Sales of all types of carriers, whether vinyl records, audio cassettes, compact discs, MP3 compact discs, music videos (i.e. excluding home videos) or any other existing or future type of carrier is considered on the basis of one unit.
- If a sound recording contains a combination of two program, any program over half of its total duration can be weighted at 50%, of the sales of the sound recording of that program. Any program comprising less than half of the total duration of the sound recording will not be counted for the purpose of certification.
- Sales in domestic markets only will be considered for the calculation of sales of sound recording.
- The time-limit for achieving above sales in any category is one year from the release of the recording in India.
- Applications should be accompanied by a copy certified by the member's chartered accountant stating the date of release & the number of units sold, along with a letter from the managing director or CEO.

== Record charts ==
=== International Top 20 Singles ===
IMI launched International Top 20 Singles chart, the first official music industry recognised record chart in India, on 21 June 2021. It ranks best-performing international singles in India based on streaming data from Amazon Music, Apple Music, and Spotify. The data is collected and aggregated by BMAT Music Innovators and chart is reviewed by IMI Charts committee. The first number-one song for the chart dated 21 June 2021, was "Butter" by BTS.

== Certification levels ==
India has separate scales for music recording certifications. Certifications are usually based on sales, like some other Asian countries. Like many other Asian countries, domestic repertoire accounts for the majority of the Indian music market. Like many other countries, sales requirements of music recording in India reduced due to music piracy, declining sales, and the rise of online streaming.

=== Current ===
The following are the current certification levels, as of 2019.

Release type	Singles		Albums	
Release type	Gold	Platinum	Gold	Platinum
Hindi films	120,000	240,000	75,000	150,000
Regional films	60,000	120,000	40,000	80,000
Pop/Basic	60,000	120,000	15,000	30,000
Devotional	50,000	100,000	10,000	20,000
Classical/Folk	10,000	20,000	5,000	10,000
International	60,000	120,000	12,000	30,000

Single and album units are measured in terms of Track Equivalent (TE) and Album Equivalent (AE) units, respectively, which are equivalent to the following media units.

Media unit(s)	Track Equivalent (TE)	Album Equivalent (AE)
Digital track download(s)	1	10
Digital album download	—N/a	1
Physical album sale	—N/a	1
CRBT (caller ring-back tones) (30 days)	2	20
Track streams	100	1,000
Video streams	300	3,000

=== Previous ===
Prior to the inclusion of music streaming in IMI certifications, the following certification levels were in use between 2007 and 2013.

Between 2007 and 2013
Release type	Gold	Platinum
Hindi Films	200,000	400,000
Regional Films	50,000	100,000
Regional Basic	25,000	50,000
National Basic	50,000	100,000
Classical/Non-Classical	15,000	30,000
International	4,000	6,000

The following certification levels were in use between 2000 and 2007.

Between 2000 and 2007
Release type	Gold	Platinum
Hindi Films	500,000	1,000,000
Regional Films	100,000	200,000
Regional Basic	60,000	120,000
National Basic	100,000	200,000
Classical/Semi-Classical	20,000	40,000
International (2006–2007)	10,000	20,000
International (2000–2006)	20,000	40,000

The following certification levels were in use up until 2000.

Up until 2000
Release type	Gold	Platinum
Hindi films	500,000	1,000,000
Indian pop	120,000	200,000
Foreign	30,000	60,000

== Highest-certified singles in India ==
List of highest-certified singles in India, according to IMI's accreditations
Accreditation	Certified units	Title	Performer nationality	Artist	Year released
71× Platinum	8,520,000	"Señorita"	Canada, US	Shawn Mendes & Camila Cabello	2019
51× Platinum	6,120,000	"Heat Waves"	UK	Glass Animals	2018
46× Platinum	5,520,000	"Believer"	US	Imagine Dragons	2017
20× Platinum	2,400,000	"Love Nwantiti"	Nigeria	CKay	2020
14× Platinum	1,680,000	"Runaway"	Norway	Aurora	2015
13× Platinum	1,560,000	"Calm Down"	Nigeria	Rema	2022

== Best-selling albums ==
=== Top ten ===
Rank	Year	Album	Music director(s)	Lyricist(s)	Singer(s)	Sales	Source(s)
1	1990	Aashiqui	Nadeem–Shravan	Sameer, Madan Pal, Rani Malik	Kumar Sanu, Anuradha Paudwal, Udit Narayan, Nitin Mukesh	20,000,000	
1	1995	Bolo Ta Ra Ra..	Jawahar Wattal	Daler Mehndi	Daler Mehndi	20,000,000	
1	1995	Dilwale Dulhania Le Jayenge	Jatin–Lalit	Anand Bakshi	Lata Mangeshkar, Kumar Sanu, Udit Narayan, Asha Bhosle, Abhijeet, Manpreet Kaur, Pamela Chopra	20,000,000	
2	1995	Billo De Ghar	Abrar-ul-Haq	Abrar-ul-Haq	Abrar-ul-Haq	16,000,000	
3	1995	Bombay	A. R. Rahman	Vairamuthu, Mehboob, Veturi	A. R. Rahman, Remo Fernandes, Suresh Peters, Swarnalatha, K. S. Chithra, Hariharan, Kavita Krishnamurthy, Udit Narayan, Annupamaa	15,000,000	
4	1981	Disco Deewane	Zoheb Hassan, Biddu	Nazia Hassan, Zoheb Hassan, Anwar Khalid, Faruq Qaiser	Nazia Hassan, Zoheb Hassan	14,000,000	
5	1997	Dil To Pagal Hai	Uttam Singh	Anand Bakshi	Lata Mangeshkar, Kumar Sanu, Udit Narayan, Asha Bhosle, Hariharan	12,500,000	
6	1994	Hum Aapke Hain Koun..!	Raamlaxman	Ravinder Rawal, Dev Kohli	Lata Mangeshkar, Kumar Sanu, S. P. Balasubrahmanyam, Udit Narayan, Sharda Sinha, Shailendra Singh	12,000,000	
7	1996	Raja Hindustani	Nadeem–Shravan	Sameer	Kumar Sanu, Udit Narayan, Alka Yagnik, Suresh Wadkar, Sapna Awasthi, Alisha Chinai, Sapna Mukheree, Bela Salukhe	11,000,000	

=== By decade ===
Decade	Year	Album	Language	Music director(s)	Lyricist(s)	Singer(s)	Sales	Source(s)
1930s	1939	Aadmi	Hindi Marathi	Master Krishnarao	Munsi Aziz	Shanta Hublikar, Ram Marathe, Sundara Bai, Shahu Modhak	—
1940s	1949	Barsaat	Hindi	Shankar Jaikishan	Hasrat Jaipuri, Shailendra, Ramesh Shashtri, Akhilesh, Jalal Malahabadi	Lata Mangeshkar, Mohammed Rafi, Mukesh	—
1950s	1951	Awaara	Hindustani	Shankar Jaikishan	Shailendra, Hasrat Jaipuri	Shamshad Begum, Mukesh, Lata Mangeshkar, Manna Dey, Mohammed Rafi	—
1960s	1964	Sangam	Hindustani	Shankar Jaikishan	Shailendra, Hasrat Jaipuri	Vyjayanthimala, Mukesh, Lata Mangeshkar, Mahendra Kapoor, Mohammed Rafi	—
1970s	1973	Bobby	Hindustani	Laxmikant–Pyarelal	Anand Bakshi, Vitthalbhai Patel	Lata Mangeshkar, Narendra Chanchal, Shailendra Singh, Manna Dey	1,000,000
1970s	1975	Sholay	Hindustani	R. D. Burman	Anand Bakshi, Salim–Javed	Kishore Kumar, Manna Dey, Lata Mangeshkar, Hema Malini, R. D. Burman	1,000,000
1980s	1983	Young Tarang	Hindustani	Zoheb Hassan, Biddu	Nazia Hassan, Zoheb Hassan, Sehba Akhtar, Amit Khanna	Nazia Hassan, Zoheb Hassan	40,000,000
1990s	1990	Aashiqui	Hindi	Nadeem–Shravan	Sameer, Madan Pal, Rani Malik	Kumar Sanu, Anuradha Paudwal, Udit Narayan, Nitin Mukesh	20,000,000
1990s	1995	Bolo Ta Ra Ra..	Punjabi	Jawahar Wattal	Daler Mehndi	Daler Mehndi	20,000,000
1990s	1995	Dilwale Dulhania Le Jayenge	Hindi	Jatin–Lalit	Anand Bakshi	Lata Mangeshkar, Kumar Sanu, Udit Narayan, Asha Bhosle, Abhijeet, Manpreet Kaur, Pamela Chopra	20,000,000
2000s	2000	Mohabbatein	Hindi	Jatin–Lalit	Anand Bakshi	Lata Mangeshkar, Udit Narayan, Shweta Pandit, Sonali Bhatawdekar, Ishaan	5,000,000
2010s	2010	Komaram Puli	Telugu	A. R. Rahman	Chandrabose	A. R. Rahman, Vijay Prakash, Tanvi Shah, Shweta Mohan, Javed Ali, Shreya Ghoshal	760,000
