= An Action Hero =

2022 Indian film by Anirudh Iyer

- Theatrical release poster
- Directed by: Anirudh Iyer
- Written by: Neeraj Yadav
- Story by: Anirudh Iyer
- Produced by: Bhushan Kumar; Krishan Kumar; Aanand L. Rai
- Starring: Ayushmann Khurrana; Jaideep Ahlawat
- Cinematography: Kaushal Shah
- Edited by: Ninad Khanolkar
- Music by: Score: Parag Chhabra; Sunny M. R. Songs: Tanishk Bagchi; Biddu; Parag Chhabra; Amar Jalal
- Production companies: T-Series; Colour Yellow Productions
- Distributed by: AA Films
- Release date: 2 December 2022
- Running time: 130 minutes
- Country: India
- Language: Hindi

An Action Hero is a 2022 Indian Hindi-language action thriller film directed by newcomer Anirudh Iyer and produced by T-Series and Colour Yellow Productions. It stars Ayushmann Khurrana as the titular character with Jaideep Ahlawat, and follows a film star on the run after accidentally killing the brother of a ruthless politician.

An Action Hero was announced in October 2021, followed by shooting schedules in India and London in the first quarter of 2022. It was released on 2 December 2022 to positive reviews from critics, but underperformed at the box office.

== Plot ==
Maanav, a famous leading film actor, arrives at Mandothi, Haryana for his film shoot. Vicky Solanki, an aspiring politician currently contesting the local elections, wants to meet Maanav to gain publicity. Due to the busy shooting schedule, Maanav does not pay attention.

When Maanav is finally about to meet Vicky, he gets distracted by the delivery of his brand new Ford Mustang and goes for a long drive. Enraged, Vicky chases him by car and manhandles him, but Maanav pushes him away and Vicky inadvertently dies from blunt trauma on the spot, after landing headfirst on a rock. Frightened, Maanav flees failing to realize that he is leaving behind a broken side mirror as evidence for the police who later find Vicky’s body.

Unbeknownst to Maanav, Vicky's brother Bhoora Solanki, swears in front of a huge gathering of his family and friends that he will avenge his brother's death, and starts his own ‘personal mission’ to hunt him down. The Haryana police conclude the role of Maanav in Vicky's murder citing the side mirror of Maanav's new Mustang. Maanav's reputation is marred, and the media fans the flames of outrage against him, who was up until now, a much-loved action hero.

Maanav flees to the house he owns in Portsmouth, England. The news reaches England as well and Maanav is forced into hiding. Bhoora learns everything from his henchman and flies to England. In a bizarre twist, Bhoora who is on a hunt for Maanav, kills two police officers who were responding to a call right in front of Maanav's home. Maanav, who did not commit the crime, is now a possible suspect. He is forced to flee the crime scene he himself witnessed.

He tries to seek help from his British lawyer, who does not respond. During his attempt to escape, Maanav's car runs out of gas and Bhoora snatches a stranger's car and catches up to him. Maanav tries to explain his innocence, but Bhoora does not listen and is hell bent on revenge. Maanav manages to overpower and lock Bhoora in the car's trunk. This starts the first in a series of so many darkly comic situations later, in which the actor is forced by a desperate need, to physically fight and save himself like 'an action hero'.

Upon pressuring his manager Roshan for help, Maanav gets to meet Sai, a lawyer and fixer, for capturing potential footage of Bhoora killing the two police officers. Sai tells Maanav to meet his illegal hacker contact in London for collecting the footage. Unbeknownst to Maanav, he also asks his friend Kaadir to catch Maanav, knowing that he is a ‘prize-catch’ on the run and can be turned in for a huge monetary reward.

Meanwhile, Bhoora escapes with the help of a tow-truck, follows and kills Sai who merely happened to be between him and his hunt. Bhoora tries to kill Maanav also, but in a darkly comic situation he is intercepted by Sai's friend Kaadir (coming for the prize catch).

Maanav has no idea why he is being saved by Kaadir. Another fight sequence emerges in which Maanav is forced to improvise his action-movie fighting skills. Maanav gets into his car and flees again, leaving Bhoora behind. Bhoora once again manages to learn about Maanav's whereabouts, this time from Kaadir as a hostage, after which he kills Kaadir.

Maanav gets hold of the footage from the illegal hacker. Being fed up running from the British police, he decides to surrender himself knowing that he now has the proof procured from the dashcams nearby his house in Portsmouth. He hopes to prove that he was not responsible for the murders. In a darkly comic situation, just as he was kneeling down with his arms raised up, right in front of the Police Commissioner's office, he is suddenly abducted by strangers in a speeding van. The kidnappers turn out to be henchmen of Masood Abraham Katkar, a much-feared terrorist who escaped from India a long time ago. He is taken by the kidnappers to a rooftop, where Katkar explains his own purpose of abducting him. In a bizarre situation, a smiling Katkar takes a photograph with Maanav and posts it on social media; the photo goes viral. The media once again gets outraged against the once revered ‘action hero’. Katkar is planning to paint a picture that he hired Maanav. In another darkly comic situation, against his own wishes, Maanav, is forced to perform a dance, to the famous and bubbly tunes of Aap Jaisa Koi at the opulent Katkar family wedding.

Bhoora, still looking for Maanav, manages to enter the hotel and disrupt Maanav's performance, only to be held at gunpoint by Katkar's men. After an interrogation, Katkar advises Bhoora to kill Maanav. Just as Bhoora is about to shoot, Maanav deflects him and Katkar gets killed dead in the skirmish. Katkar's men are alerted and arrive to kill them both. Maanav and Bhoora manage to defeat Katkar's men before turning on each other. With his newfound action skills, Maanav defeats and wounds Bhoora and tries to reason with Bhoora explaining that Vicky's death was an accident. Bhoora refuses to spare him out of ego despite being aware of his innocence. Out of choices, Maanav abruptly kills Bhoora, using his movie star fighting skills one last time.

Maanav quietly realizes that India's much wanted terrorist, Katkar, has just been killed. Thinking quickly, he formulates a plan to project a story that the government used Maanav's situation and secretly assigned him on an operation, and that Katkar was killed in the secret government operation by government security forces.

This instantly turns his status from being a criminal to a hero. The public perception about him abruptly changes. The same loud-mouthed hosts on the TV are now showering praises on the action hero and the news spreads. The officer at the embassy who supposedly ‘arranged the secret operation’ receives an award from the government. Maanav returns to India, waving to his adoring fans outside the Chhatrapati Shivaji Maharaj International Airport

== Cast ==
- Ayushmann Khurrana as Maanav Khuranna
- Jaideep Ahlawat as Bhoora Singh Solanki
- Asad Shan as Imaad
- Jitender Hooda as Inspector Roop Kumar
- Neeraj Madhav as Sai
- Harsh Chhaya as Roshan, Maanav's assistant
- Gautam Joglekar as Masood Abraham Katkar
- Akanksha Vishwakarma as Sheetal, the Assistant director
- Pankaj Mathur as Guddu
- Sumit Singh as Vicky Solanki
- Badrul Islam as Tillu Mandothiya
- Vaquar Shaikh as Kaadir
- Praveen Rao as Head Constable
- Anupam Gahoi as Constable
- Ajay Raju As Spot Boy

Cameo appearances

- Akshay Kumar as Anupam
- Malaika Arora as Maanav's co-star
- Nora Fatehi as Maanav's heroine in the song "Jehda Nasha"

== Production ==
=== Development ===
The film was announced in October 2021.

=== Filming ===
Filming began in January 2022 in London and concluded in March 2022.

== Music ==
An Action Hero

Soundtrack album by Tanishk Bagchi, Biddu, Parag Chhabra and Amar Jalal
- Released: 30 November 2022
- Recorded: 2021–22
- Genre: Feature film soundtrack
- Length: 17:00
- Language: Hindi
- Label: T-Series
External audio
- An Action Hero (Jukebox) on YouTube

Singles from An Action Hero
- 1. "Jehda Nasha" Released: 17 November 2022; 2. "Aap Jaisa Koi" Released: 26 November 2022

The music of the film is composed by Tanishk Bagchi, Biddu, Parag Chhabra and Amar Jalal. The background score is composed by Sunny M.R. and the Action Hero Theme is composed by Parag Chhabra.

The song "Jehda Nasha" was recreated from the 2019 track Nasha which was sung by IP Singh, Amar Jalal, written by Amar Jalal Group and composed by Faridkot, Amar Jalal. The song "Aap Jaisa Koi" was recreated from the 1980 film Qurbani sung by Pakistani singer Nazia Hassan, and was composed by British Indian producer Biddu. The song was featured in the film as an item number, picturised on Zeenat Aman.

The film version of "Aap Jaisa Koi" replaces original male vocalist Altamash Faridi with Yash Narvekar.

Track listing
No.	Title	Lyrics	Music	Singer(s)	Length
1.	"Ghere"	Vayu	Parag Chhabra	Vivek Hariharan, Parag Chhabra	3:29
2.	"Asli Action Chaalu" (Theme Song)	D'Evil, Shah Rule	Parag Chhabra	D'Evil, Shah Rule	3:05
3.	"An Action Hero Theme"	Instrumental	Parag Chhabra	Instrumental	0:50
4.	"Aap Jaisa Koi"	Indeevar, Tanishk Bagchi	Tanishk Bagchi	Zahrah S Khan, Altamash Faridi	2:58
5.	"Jehda Nasha"	Amar Jalal, Balla Jalal	Tanishk Bagchi, Faridkot, Amar Jalal	Yohani, IP Singh, Amar Jalal, Harjot Kaur	3:42
6.	"Aap Jaisa Koi" (Film Version)	Indeevar, Tanishk Bagchi	Tanishk Bagchi	Zahrah S Khan, Yash Narvekar	2:56
Total length:					17:00

== Release ==
An Action Hero was theatrically released on 2 December 2022.

=== Home media ===
The satellite and digital rights were acquired by Sony Max and Netflix. The film began streaming on Netflix from 27 January 2023.

== Reception ==
=== Critical response ===
An Action Hero received mostly positive reviews from critics. On the review aggregator website Rotten Tomatoes, 85% of 13 critics' reviews are positive, with an average rating of 6.1/10.

Bollywood Hungama gave 4/5 stars and wrote "An Action Hero works due to Ayushmann's action-oriented role and Jaideep's screen presence. The twist in the last 30 minutes adds to the fun". Saibal Chatterjee of NDTV gave 3.5/5 stars and wrote "The film bustles with coiled energy every time Jaideep Ahlawat is on the screen as a toughie responding to a rough, ready and rustic notion of justice and self-worth".

Sonil Dedhia of News 18 gave 3.5/5 stars and said that the film is "wacky, breezy, bizarre and outlandish". Pratikshya Mishra of The Quint gave 3.5/5 stars and wrote "The film makes fun of everything it can get its hands on while weaving a story worthy of its strong cast".

Devesh Sharma of Filmfare gave 3.5/5 stars and wrote "The film is cleverly written. It serves us twists and turns admiringly well. The insider jokes are a hoot. The arrogance of a superstar is on point". Kartik Bhardwaj of Cinema Express gave 3.5/5 stars and wrote "Ayushmann Khurrana and Jaideep Ahlawat lock horns in this cheeky take on stars, fans, and media culture".

Himesh Mankad of Pinkvilla gave 3.5/5 stars and wrote "An Action Hero is an intelligently written action thriller, wherein the director follows his conviction to strike the right balance in the genre with some humor and whacky scenarios". Rohit Bhatnagar of The Free Press Journal gave 3.5/5 stars and said that the film might derail from the set formula concept, but it might entertain and delve deeper into world affairs.

Pallabi Dey Purkayastha of OTTplay gave 3.5/5 stars and wrote "Forget about the questionable choice of title, An Action Hero is actually an intelligent dark comedy that will leave you in splits on more than one occasion. And that, for any moviegoer, is good enough reason to give it a go". Sukanya Verma of Rediff gave 3/5 stars and wrote "An Action Hero oil and water combination of genres doesn't always gel, gets overly far-fetched in places but still holds up on the strength of whimsy and surprise".

Archika Khurana of The Times of India gave 3/5 stars and wrote "The interesting thing about the film is not so much the story itself, but seeing Ayushmann Khurrana get into the skin of an action hero and flex his muscles (literally) on screen". Anna M. M. Vetticad of Firstpost gave 2.75/5 stars and wrote "An Action Hero combines slick action with crackerjack chemistry between its leads. The near-erasure of women in the story is depressing, but the film’s pace gives us little time to think".

Anuj Kumar of The Hindu wrote "Debutant writer-director Anirudh Iyer delivers a piquant entertainer that makes sharp observations on the fickleness of fame and futility of bloated egos". Monika Rawal Kukreja of Hindustan Times wrote "Watch An Action Hero for some brash and raw action, and if you enjoy cat and mouse chase, you would find this crazy ride equally funny".

== Accolades ==
Award	Ceremony date	Category	Recipients	Result	Ref.
Filmfare Awards	27 April 2023	Best Supporting Actor	Jaideep Ahlawat	Nominated	
Filmfare Awards	27 April 2023	Best Debut Director	Anirudh Iyer	Nominated	
Filmfare Awards	27 April 2023	Best Story	Anirudh Iyer	Nominated	
Filmfare Awards	27 April 2023	Best Screenplay	Neeraj Yadav	Nominated	
Filmfare Awards	27 April 2023	Best Dialogue	Neeraj Yadav	Nominated	
Filmfare Awards	27 April 2023	Best Editing	Ninad Khanolkar	Won	
Filmfare Awards	27 April 2023	Best Cinematography	Kaushal Shah	Nominated	
International Indian Film Academy Awards	28 September 2024	Best Supporting Actor	Jaideep Ahlawat	Nominated	
