= Hotline (Nazia and Zohaib Hassan album) =

Studio album by Nazia & Zoheb Hassan
- Released: 1 January 1987
- Genre: Pakistani pop
- Producer: Biddu

Nazia & Zoheb Hassan chronology
Young Tarang (1983)	Hotline (1987)	Camera Camera (1992)

Hotline was the fourth studio album from the Pakistani pop duo of Nazia and Zoheb (Nazia Hassan and Zohaib Hassan), released in 1987. It was produced by the Indian producer Biddu. Along with several other albums from Biddu and the Hassan duo, its success in India contributed to the creation of the Indi-pop market. It was also released in the United Kingdom in 1987. It was the best-selling album of the duo after Disco Deewane.

== Track listing ==
1. Telephone Pyar - Nazia Hassan & Zahra Hassan
2. Hum Aurr Tum - Nazia Hassan & Zoheb Hassan
3. Soja - Zoheb Hassan & Zahra Hassan
4. Aan Haan - Nazia Hassan
5. Khubsorat - Zoheb Hassan
6. Teri Yaad - Nazia Hassan
7. Paisa - Zoheb Hassan
8. Dharti Hamari - Zoheb Hassan
9. Ajnabi - Nazia Hassan
10. Number Ek - Zoheb Hassan
11. Hamaisha - Nazia Hassan
12. Kaam Kaam Kaam (CD Release only) - Zoheb Hassan
13. Dosti - Nazia Hasaan & Zohaib Hassan

== Music ==
- Biddu
- Zohaib Hassan

== Lyrics ==
- Sabir Zafar
- Nazia Hassan
- Zohaib Hassan
