= Nazia and Zoheb =

Pakistani pop duo

- Origin: Karachi, Sindh, Pakistan
- Genres: Pop; Pakistani pop
- Years active: 1980–1992
- Labels: EMI Records; Sony Music Entertainment; Saregama
- Past members: Nazia Hassan; Zoheb Hassan

Nazia and Zoheb (Urdu: نازیہ اور زوہیب) were a brother and sister Pakistani pop duo from Karachi, Sindh. Formed in 1980. The group consisted of siblings Nazia Hassan (born on 3 April 1965; died on 13 August 2000) and Zoheb Hassan (born on 18 November 1966), collectively known as The Hassans or Hazan. They are often credited with contributing to the growth of the Pakistani pop scene and achieved commercial success, reportedly selling more than 60 million albums worldwide.

The duo initially gained attention with their single "Aap Jaisa Koi," featured on the soundtrack for the 1980 Indian film Qurbani. They later released their debut album, Disco Deewane in 1981, produced by Indian producer Biddu. Disco Deewane became a best-selling Asian pop album, charting in 14 countries worldwide and becoming a hit in Brazil, Russia, South Africa, and Indonesia. The album helped shape pop music in Pakistan and India. The duo released their second album, Boom Boom in 1982, which was the soundtrack for the Bollywood movie Star. In 1983, the band recorded their third album, Young Tarang, and the first album from Pakistan to feature a music video. Nazia and Zoheb released their fourth album, Hotline in 1987, which featured the duo's younger sister, Zahra Hassan.

Nazia and Zoheb announced that their fifth album would be their final album. The group released their last studio album, Camera Camera, in 1992, written and produced solely by Zoheb. This album failed to achieve the same success as their previous albums due to Nazia falling severely ill, preventing the duo from promoting the album. After its release, Nazia retired from her singing career to focus on her health and personal life. Zoheb pursued a career as an actor and solo artist, releasing his solo debut album Kismat in 2006.

Nazia died of lung cancer in London on 13 August 2000, at the age of 35. After her death, Zoheb Hassan stepped away from his singing career, before making a comeback in 2014 with songs like "Jaana", "Chehra" and "Dheeray Dheeray" for the musical series Coke Studio Pakistan.

== History ==
=== Early years (1975–1981) ===
Nazia and Zoheb spent their childhood in Karachi and London. In the late 1970s, both siblings participated in "Sang Sang Chalien" and "Kaliyon Ke Mala", musical shows for children hosted by Sohail Rana. In 1976, Nazia and Zoheb made a cameo appearance in the Pakistani film Beyond the Last Mountain, as extras in a musical scene. Nazia's professional career started at fifteen when she provided lead vocals for the song "Aap Jaisa Koi" for the 1980 film Qurbani. Nazia was introduced to the film's director, Feroz Khan, by his friend Biddu, an Indian music producer in the United Kingdom. The song was a success in India and led to Nazia winning the Filmfare Award for Best Female Playback Singer in 1981.

=== Breakthrough era (1981–1983) ===
After the success of "Aap Jaisa Koi", Qurbani became a hit. Nazia and her brother collaborated with Biddu, releasing the pop album "Disco Deewane" in 1981. The album broke sales records in Pakistan, India, Bangladesh, South Africa and topped the charts in the West Indies, Latin America and Russia. Zoheb composed 6 of the 10 tracks on the album.

After the release of "Disco Deewane", Nazia and Zoheb were offered roles in the movie Star by Biddu, but they declined in order to focus on their music career. However, Nazia's second album Star/Boom Boom was used as the soundtrack for the movie, released in 1982. While the film did not perform well at the box office, the album was well-received.

=== Continued success (1983–1989) ===
Nazia and Zoheb's third album, Young Tarang, was released in 1983.

Over thirty years later, an India Today article titled "Nazia makes a lovely comeback" celebrated Nazia Hassan's musical appearance in the 2012 film, Miss Lovely, which premiered at the Cannes Film Festival: "The film has made the audience nostalgic over Ahluwalia's use of the song "Dum dum de de" from Hassan's 1984 album, Young Tarang." Miss Lovely director, Ashim Ahluwalia, said the original track was kept untouched: "The song symbolises the '80s and the lyrics of the song were in sync with the mood of the film. [We] retained Nazia's voice. We didn't want to remix this song because the original was perfect."

=== Retirement (1990–1995) ===
In 1991, Nazia and Zoheb recorded their fifth album, Camera Camera. Before the album's release, Nazia and Zoheb announced it would be their last album. The album was released in 1992 and featured tracks like the Punjabi classic "Taali Dey Thalay." Camera Camera failed to match the success of their previous albums, possibly due to the decision not to promote the album, as Nazia had been diagnosed with cancer.

=== Nazia's death and legacy (2000–2003) ===
Nazia Hassan died of lung cancer in London on 13 August 2000 at the age of 35. In 2003, Nazia's family established the Nazia Hassan Foundation, a charitable organization, in her name.

== Discography ==
=== Albums ===
| Year | Album title |
|---|---|
| 1982 | Star / Boom Boom |
| 1983 | Young Tarang |
| 1987 | Hotline |
| 1992 | Camera Camera |

=== Film soundtracks ===
| Year | Album title |
|---|---|
| 1982 | Star |
| 1986 | Dilwala |
| 1986 | Ilzaam |
| 1987 | Sheela |
| 1989 | Saaya |

| Year | Title | Note |
|---|---|---|
| 2003 | Gaye Ge Dunia Geet Mere | Geo TV |
| 2006 | Kismet Show | Geo TV |
| 2007 | Hum Morning Show | Hum TV |
| 2007 | Marina Morning | ARY Digital |
| 2007 | Baat Niklay Gee Tu | ARY Digital |
| 2008 | Tribute to Nazia Hassan | Play TV |
| 2008 | Nazia Hassan Ke Salgirah | MTV |
| 2008 | Subah Sawaire with Shaista | ARY OneWorld |

== See also ==
- List of Pakistani music bands
- Nermin Niazi and Feisal Mosleh (known for 1984's Disco Se Aagay)
