= Star (1982 film) =

- Poster
- Directed by: Vinod Pande
- Written by: Biddu
- Screenplay by: Biddu, Tariq Yunus
- Produced by: Biddu
- Starring: Kumar Gaurav; Rati Agnihotri; Padmini Kolhapure; Raj Kiran
- Cinematography: Nadeem Khan
- Music by: Biddu
- Production company: Mehboob Studios
- Release date: 22 October 1982 (India)
- Country: India
- Language: Hindi

Star is a 1982 Indian Bollywood movie, directed by Vinod Pande, starring Kumar Gaurav, Rati Agnihotri, Raj Kiran, Saeed Jaffrey, A.K. Hangal, Dina Pathak and Padmini Kolhapure.

It had a very successful soundtrack released as Star/Boom Boom, produced by Biddu and sung by Nazia Hassan and Zoheb Hassan. Despite popular soundtracks, the movie flopped at the box office.

Nazia and Zoheb were offered the chance to act in this movie by Biddu, but they refused to act and chose singing.

== Plot ==
Dev Kumar Verma comes from a middle-class family and must find employment to support his parents. Dev, however, has set his mind upon becoming a music sensation like Elvis Presley.

He loses his job because of this and refuses to work until he gets a job to his liking, much to his parents' dismay and his brother, Shiv Kumar Verma. Dev gets employment at Charlie's Disco, where he meets Maya and falls in love with her.

When Charlie's Disco's competitor, Rana, finds out about Dev, he wants to hire Dev, but Dev decides to continue to work with Charlie's Disco. Consequently, Dev and Charlie get beaten up by Rana's men, and Dev cannot sing.

After recuperating, Dev is devastated to find out that Maya and Shiv are in love with each other.

== Cast ==
- Kumar Gaurav...Dev Kumar Verma
- Rati Agnihotri...Maya
- Padmini Kolhapure...Dev's fan (Cameo)
- Raj Kiran...Shiv Kumar Verma
- Saeed Jaffrey...Rana
- A.K. Hangal...Mr. Verma
- Dina Pathak...Mrs. Verma
- Raja Bundela...Salim (Dev's friend)
- Ravindra Kapoor...Charlie
- Rajendra Kumar...Himself (Guest Appearance)
- Bob Christo...Samson
- Yunus Parvez...Dev's employer
- Biddu...Himself (Guest Appearance)
- Dinesh Kaushik as Contestant singer
- Piloo Wadia....Parsee lady waiting for lift
- Vinod Pande...(guest appearance) as police inspector in hospital
- Devika Bhojwani...Contest announcer

== Soundtrack ==
All songs were composed by Biddu, lyrics written by Indeevar & Amit Khanna & sung by Pakistani pop duo Nazia and Zoheb, consisting of Nazia Hassan and her brother Zoheb Hassan, under label of EMI India which were Also known as or The Gramophone Company Of India.

#	Title	Singer(s)	Lyrics
1	"Star"	Zoheb Hassan	Indeevar
2	"Boom Boom"	Nazia Hassan	Indeevar
3	"Jaana"	Nazia & Zoheb Hassan	Amit Khanna
4	"Khushi"	Nazia Hassan	Amit Khanna
5	"Ooie-Ooie"	Zoheb Hassan	Amit Khanna
6	"Dheere Dheere"	Zoheb Hassan	Amit Khanna
7	"Koi Nahin"	Nazia Hassan	Amit Khanna
8	"Zindagi"	Zoheb Hassan	Amit Khanna
9	"Muskuraye Ja"	Zoheb Hassan	Amit Khanna & Indeevar

== Awards and nominations ==
- Filmfare Nomination for Best Female Playback Singer - Nazia Hassan for the song "Boom Boom"
