= Camera Camera (Nazia and Zoheb Hassan album) =

Studio album by Nazia & Zoheb Hassan
- Released: 30 July 1992
- Genre: Pakistani pop

Nazia & Zoheb Hassan chronology
Hotline (1987)	Camera Camera (1992)

Camera Camera is the 1992 studio album by Nazia and Zoheb. Primarily in the Urdu language, the album also featured two English songs (If and If You Could Read My Mind). Reviews noted that the album was influenced by the Pet Shop Boys. The album came several years after the successful run of four LPs which had ended with the 1987 album Hotline. This fifth album enjoyed only modest success and was the duo's last. It was released on 30 July 1992 coincided with Strings's album 2.

== Track list ==
1. Camera - Nazia Hassan
2. If - Zoheb Hassan
3. Mehrbani - Nazia Hassan
4. Walavai - Zoheb Hassan
5. Tali De Thullay - Nazia Hassan
6. Camera (Dance Mix) - Nazia Hassan
7. Nasha - Nazia Hassan & Zoheb Hassan
8. Pyar Ka Geet - Zoheb Hassan
9. If You Could Read My Mind - Zoheb Hassan
10. Mama Papa - Nazia Hassan & Zoheb Hassan
11. Dil Ki Lagi - Nazia Hassan
12. Kyoun - Zoheb Hassan

== Credits ==
Vocals – Nazia Hassan, Zoheb Hassan

Lyrics By – Nazia Hassan and Zoheb Hassan, Indevar, Sabir Zafar.

Music By, Arranged By, Producer – Zoheb Hassan (tracks: 1, 2, 5, 6 to 10, 12)

Music By – Bappi Lahri (tracks: 3, 4, 11), Mian Yousuf Sallauddin (track 5), Gordon Lightfoot (track 9)

Producer – Jamie Lane (tracks: 2, 9 )

Remix – Jamie Lane (tracks: 4, 6, 7)

Keyboards, Programmed By, Guitar – Tony Lowe

Saxophone – Martin Dobson

Tabla, Percussion – Kuljit Burma

Publisher: Timbuktu Records UK LTD

Photography by – D.C.B. Photos

Album Cover Design – The Bureaux Graphics Group

== Notes ==
On the CD inlay:

"We would really like to thank our fans; you are the reason for our success over the last decade. We would also like to thank our parents for their encouragement, guidance and support and all at Timbuktu records for believing in the project"
