= Music '89 =

- Created by: Shoaib Mansoor
- Presented by: Nazia Hassan; Zohaib Hassan
- Country of origin: Pakistan

Music '89 was the first ever all pop music stage-show to be aired on Pakistan TV.

== Music '89 pop music show ==
This music show was aired in January 1989, on PTV (Pakistan state run TV channel). The show was directed by Shoaib Mansoor and hosted by the famous pop singer Nazia Hassan and her brother, Zohaib Hassan. It was a revolutionary show that introduced a new breed of young musicians post- Nazia and Zoheb.

The show was the launching pad for much new talent in Pakistan and many new artistes including Vital Signs, Ali Haider, Sajjad Ali, Jupiters, Strings, while also introducing underground, "alternative" bands including Final Cut and The Barbarians (Pakistani band).

In a 2014 interview before his death, Aslam Azhar (1932 – 2015), widely-considered to be the founding father of Pakistani television considered this musical event, 'Music '89' (pop music show), to be one of his significant career achievements at Pakistan Television Corporation (PTV). He described it by saying, "I held a programme called Music '89 that was hailed as a breath of fresh air".
