= Winston Sela =

- Born: Winston Gerard Kelaart Sela; Sri Lanka
- Occupations: Musician, songwriter, record producer, arranger
- Instrument: Keyboards
- Years active: 1970s–present
- Website: winstonsela.com

Winston Sela is a songwriter, producer and musician. The songs that he has written or co-written include, "Blonde", "Who's Been Kissing You", "Close to You", "Independence", "When I Can't Have You", "Love Is All There Is" and "You Bring Out the Best in Me"

== Background ==
Sela was born in Sri Lanka. He would work with Biddu on several occasions.

== Career ==
=== 1970s ===
Sela wrote the songs "Calico Jam" and "Sparrow" for the group Inshallah. He and N. Findelsen produced both sides. It appears that John Peel as per his 21 July review in Sounds hated the record.

Sela and Nat Kipner wrote "I Just Can't Get Over You" which Johnny Mathis recorded with Deniece Williams. It was included on Mathis' That's What Friends Are For album that was released in 1978.

=== 1980s ===
Working with Biddu and Ron Roker, he co-wrote the song "Who's Been Kissing You" which was recorded by Hot Cuisine. It was a dance hit in the US and peaked at No. 31 on the Billboard Disco Top 80 chart for the week of 3 October 1981. Some decades later, UK group SouLutions had some success with it.

Sela and his friend Biddu were working on albums which were recorded at Sela's home. They were Young Tarang and Hotline for artists Nazia Hassan and Zoheb Hassan. While working on the albums Sela and Biddu had written a song "Don't Tell Me This Is Love". They had just about forgotten about the song when Biddu had a call from a friend Annette Barrett who informed him that the song had been recorded in Japanese. At the time they weren't that excited about it. Two months later the single by Akina Nakamori was at No. 1 in Japan.

Sela and Biddu wrote the song "Applause" which was recorded by Angie Gold and produced by Nigel Wright. Backed with "Creature Of The Night", it was released on Passion PASH 62 in 1986. It peaked at No. 2 on the Record Mirror Eurobeat chart for the week of 4 October.

Sela and Biddu wrote the song "The Look that Kills" which was recorded by Akina Nakamori. It was her 18th single that was released on 3 June 1987. It made it to No. 1 on the Oricon weekly chart and was ranked 7th on the 1987 annual chart.

Sela wrote and produced "Voodoo Love" for Judy La Rose. It was mixed by Pete Hammond and Pete Waterman. Music journalist James Hamilton referred to it as a bright pop-slanted and quite Hi-NRG 122bpm catchy galloper" that was a Bananarama-like a House Mix with a Latin flavored instrumental on the B side. It had a positive review in the 26 December 1987 issue of Music & Media where the reviewer wrote that it had already been taken up very quickly and had the "winning radio sound of the moment".

=== 1990s ===
Working with Maxi Priest and Gary Benson, Sela co-wrote the song "Close to You". It was a sizable hit and made it to No. 1 in the United States. It was also a No. 7 hit in the UK.

Sela and Leon Ware wrote the song "Independence" which was a hit for Lulu in 1993.

Sela and fellow producer Mark Stevens produced the single "Wherever You Go" for the Wee Papas, a group which was formerly called the Wee Papa Girl Rappers. It was released on the Big Orange label in 1994. It had a positive review in the 9 July issue of Music & Media.

Working with Jeff Chegwin, Sela produced "Sleepin' With Her" for female duo Angelterre. The record was released on the Dance Pool label in January 1995.

Along with Michael Garvin and Anthony Smith, Sela wrote "Love Is All There Is" which was recorded by Sabrina Salerno and released in January 1999. It was then recorded by Dana International and released in March 1999.

=== 2000s - 2020s ===
Sela wrote "When I Can't Have You" which was recorded by John Farnham and included on his The Last Time album that was released in 2002.

It was reported by Billboard in the magazine's 5 April 2003 issue that Sela had signed his WS. Music to a worldwide administration agreement with company, Blue-Water Music Services.

Sela co-wrote the song "I'm Confused" which was recorded by Pandora. It spent seven weeks in the Swedish charts in 2004, peaking at No. 6.
