= Student of the Year (soundtrack) =

Soundtrack album by Vishal–Shekhar
- Released: 31 August 2012
- Recorded: 2011–2012
- Genre: Feature film soundtrack
- Length: 27:22
- Language: Hindi
- Label: Sony Music India
- Producer: Vishal–Shekhar

Vishal–Shekhar chronology
Shanghai (2012)	Student of the Year (2012)	Gippi (2013)

Student of the Year is the soundtrack album to the 2012 film of the same name directed by Karan Johar and produced by Dharma Productions and Red Chillies Entertainment, starring Sidharth Malhotra, Alia Bhatt and Varun Dhawan in their acting debuts. The film's soundtrack featured seven songs composed by Vishal–Shekhar with lyrics written by Anvita Dutt Guptan. The soundtrack was released under the Sony Music India label on 31 August 2012.

== Development ==
Vishal–Shekhar composed the film's soundtrack and score, in their first collaboration with Johar as a director. The duo had earlier composed for Dharma Productions' Dostana (2008) and I Hate Luv Storys (2010). As Johar's directorials were well known for its music, Vishal–Shekhar were "determined to make the music the best ever". Much of the film's music, including the hook, were written at the Gloria Jeans store in Bandra, Mumbai. The song "Radha" sampled the song "Dafli Wale Dafli Baja", which originally had music by Laxmikant-Pyarelal and lyrics by Anand Bakshi from the film Sargam (1979), also starred Rishi Kapoor in the lead. "The Disco Song" is a revamped cover version of "Disco Deewane" (1981) by Nazia Hassan, incorporating her vocals along with those of Sunidhi Chauhan and Benny Dayal.

== Reception ==
The soundtrack received positive reviews from music critics. Joginder Tuteja of Bollywood Hungama gave the album 4/5 stars, saying that "Student of the Year is a winner with Vishal Shekhar (yet again!) justifying their stance of doing a few films but lending quality sound to it." A reviewer based at Indo-Asian News Service gave the album 4/5 stars, describing it as "a good mix with very minor flaws that can surely be ignored to enjoy the music that perfectly describes the mood of the movie." Karthik Srinivasan of Milliblog stated "Student of the Year offers perky, enjoyable – albeit predictable – music." In contrast, Jaspreet Pandohar of BBC stated "Billed as Bollywood's answer to Glee, Johar's flash college campus romance is obviously aimed at hip, young Indians, but that doesn't stop Student of the Year sounding like a poor prom. Vishal and Shekhar would have been better off creating an evergreen soundtrack in the mould of Grease, with songs to appeal across generations."

The soundtrack became an instant commercial success, with each song being played on air soon after its release. Johar admitted that the team expected the music album would be a success and credited the duo's efforts, adding "we're very glad the music is rocking, and full credit goes to Vishal-Shekhar and Anvita (Dutt Guptan) for putting together such a fantastic album." "Ishq Wala Love" became the biggest hit of the album, ranking in Radio Mirchi's Top 20 until 2013.

== Track listing ==
No.	Title	Singer(s)	Length
1.	"The Disco Song"	Benny Dayal, Nazia Hassan, Sunidhi Chauhan	5:42
2.	"Ishq Wala Love"	Shekhar Ravjiani, Salim Merchant, Neeti Mohan	4:18
3.	"Radha"	Shreya Ghoshal, Udit Narayan, Vishal Dadlani, Shekhar Ravjiani	5:41
4.	"Ratta Maar"	Vishal Dadlani, Shefali Alvares	3:30
5.	"Kukkad"	Shahid Mallya, Nisha Mascarenhas, Marianne D'Cruz	4:22
6.	"Vele"	Shekhar Ravjiani, Vishal Dadlani, Pranav Jain	3:50
Total length:			27:22

== Awards and nominations ==
Ceremony	Category	Recipient	Result	Ref.
Apsara Film & Television Producers Guild Awards	Best Female Playback Singer	Neeti Mohan (for the song "Ishq Wala Love")	Nominated	
Filmfare Awards	Best Music Director	Vishal–Shekhar	Nominated	
Filmfare Awards	R. D. Burman Award	Neeti Mohan (for the song "Ishq Wala Love")	Won	
Mirchi Music Awards	Song of The Year	"Radha"	Nominated	
Mirchi Music Awards	Album of the Year	Student of the Year	Nominated	
Mirchi Music Awards	Listener's Choice Album of the Year	Student of the Year	Won	
Mirchi Music Awards	Listener's Choice Song of the Year	"Radha"	Won	
Screen Awards	Best Music Director	Vishal–Shekhar	Nominated	
Screen Awards	Best Female Playback	Shreya Ghoshal (for the song "Radha")	Nominated	
Stardust Awards	New Musical Sensation Singer – Female	Neeti Mohan (for the song "Ishq Wala Love")	Nominated	
The Times of India Film Awards	Best Music Director	Vishal–Shekhar	Nominated	
Zee Cine Awards	Best Music Director	Vishal–Shekhar	Nominated	
Zee Cine Awards	Best Playback Singer – Female	Shreya Ghoshal (for the song "Radha")	Nominated	
Zee Cine Awards	Best Playback Singer – Female	Sunidhi Chauhan (for the song "Disco Song")	Nominated	
Zee Cine Awards	Song of the Year	"Radha"	Won	
