= Qurbani (film) =

1980 Hindi film directed by Feroz Khan

- Poster
- Directed by: Feroz Khan
- Written by: Feroz Khan; K. K. Shukla
- Produced by: Feroz Khan
- Starring: Feroz Khan; Vinod Khanna; Zeenat Aman; Aruna Irani; Amjad Khan; Amrish Puri; Shakti Kapoor; Kader Khan
- Cinematography: Kamal Bose
- Edited by: Feroz Khan
- Music by: Kalyanji-Anandji; Biddu
- Distributed by: F.K. International
- Release date: 20 June 1980
- Running time: 160 minutes
- Country: India
- Language: Hindi
- Budget: ₹2.5 crore
- Box office: ₹ 25.8 crore

Qurbani (transl. Sacrifice) is a 1980 Indian Hindi-language musical romantic action thriller film produced, directed, co-written by and starring Feroz Khan (under the banner FK International). The film co-stars Vinod Khanna, Zeenat Aman, Amjad Khan, Shakti Kapoor, Aruna Irani, Amrish Puri and Kader Khan.

The film released on 20 June 1980 and was declared a blockbuster. It was the highest-grossing film of 1980. This film also won 2 Filmfare Awards.

It is said to be inspired by the 1972 Italian-West German movie The Master Touch.

== Plot ==
Rajesh, a former motorcycle stuntman in a circus, is now a thief, expert in breaking open treasuries. In one such robbery, he is being watched by police inspector Amjad Khan. Sheela is a gorgeous disco club dancer and singer, Rajesh and Sheela are in love, but Rajesh has not disclosed to Sheela that he is a thief. Inspector Amjad Khan arrests Rajesh for theft after he is seen by an officer at a traffic accident. The court sentences Rajesh to two years imprisonment. Sheela is devastated after she realises Rajesh is a thief. Rajesh meets Vikram in jail, who along with his sister Jwaala, seeks revenge against crime boss Rakka, who cheated Jwaala and siphoned her money.

Meanwhile, Amar is a criminal in Rakka's gang who revolts against Rakka. He is a widower with a daughter Tina (Natasha Chopra) studying in a boarding school. Before quitting Rakka's gang, Amar has committed a crime, masked, and inspector Amjad Khan is investigating that case. Amar saves Sheela from a gang of rowdy bikers. They meet regularly as Sheela grows fond of Tina. Soon, Amar begins to love Sheela, who does not reciprocate because she still loves Rajesh. After a short time, Amar and Sheela get together.

Rajesh completes his prison sentence. Upon release, he meets Vikram who again reminds him of the deal to rob Rakka. During the conversation, Amar incidentally reaches the site and a fist fight ensues between Amar and Vikram. While fleeing, Vikram swears revenge against Amar. Thus Rajesh and Amar meet for the first time. Rajesh takes Amar to introduce him to Sheela; Sheela and Amar pretend as if they do not know each other since they don't want Rajesh to suspect them.

Later, Vikram's goons kidnap Tina and beat Amar, who is hospitalized. In return for Amar and his daughter's safety, Rajesh agrees to do Vikram's job. He nurses Amar back to health and soon they become thick friends. Amar promises Rajesh he will support him in this one last robbery. They plan to shift to London after the robbery with the money. They concoct a scheme whereby Amar would steal gold bars and jewellery from a safe, phone the police, let Rajesh take the blame and get arrested, and be sentenced for about 12 to 18 months. After his release, he will join Amar in the UK.

Things don't go according to plan as Rajesh gets arrested for killing Rakka, while Amar and Sheela arrive in London with the stolen money. Rajesh thinks that Amar framed him to keep all the money (as well as Sheela) for himself. Rajesh escapes from prison and arrives in London to confront Amar. After a brief tussle, Rajesh realises that Amar did not frame him. Vikram and his goons reach London to take revenge against Rajesh and Amar. In the climax, Amar sacrifices himself to save Rajesh, Sheela and Tina from getting killed by Vikram.

== Cast ==
- Feroz Khan as Rajesh Kumar
- Vinod Khanna as Amar
- Zeenat Aman as Sheela
- Amjad Khan as Police Inspector Amjad Khan
- Shakti Kapoor as Vikram Singh
- Amrish Puri as Rakka
- Aruna Irani as Jwaala Singh
- Kader Khan as Joe
- Tun Tun as Fat Woman
- Jagdeep as Mohammad Ali
- Dinesh Hingoo as Parsi Man
- Viju Khote as Vikram's henchman
- Mac Mohan as Mac
- Sanjay Khan as Narrator

== Production ==
The film had a production budget of ₹1.55 crore ($2 million). (Note: 7.8629 Indian rupees per US dollar in 1980) Filming began in 1979, and was one of the most expensive Indian films at the time. Feroz Khan's expenses included ₹23 lakh for a new camera, ₹5.3 lakh for several scenes (including a song sequence) on a large set (representing a Pathan's den), and ₹16,590 for an authentic silver sword. Cine Blitz suggested in 1979 that the production costs of Qurbani may exceed those of Abdullah, another similarly expensive production at the time.

To draw shock from the audience, a scene was included with the calculated decimation of a Mercedes-Benz in an underground parking lot. This was at a time when not many in India had seen a Mercedes, let alone sat in one.

UK stunts were designed and arranged by James Dowdall, photographed by Eric Van Herren and produced by Nick Farnes who, with James Dowdall, wrote the UK scenario.

Feroz Khan initially asked Amitabh Bachchan to play the role of Amar. Amitabh replied he would be available in 6 months, according to Feroz, but Feroz could not wait that long. So the role of Amar went to Vinod Khanna.

== Box office ==
The film was going to be released on 27 June 1980 and clash with Karz but the sudden demise of Sanjay Gandhi on 23 June 1980, resulted in the release postponed for one week and finally it was released on 30 June 1980 to become the biggest hit of the year, with a gross revenue of ₹13.8 crore (net income of ₹12.4 crore) at the Indian box office in 1980. This is equivalent to US$15.26 million in 1980, or US$60 million (₹330 crore) in 2018.

== Music ==
Qurbani

Soundtrack album by Biddu and Kalyanji–Anandji
- Released: 1979
- Recorded: 1979
- Genres: Bollywood soundtrack; Disco; Filmi qawwali
- Length: 25:17
- Languages: Hindi; Urdu
- Producers: Biddu; Kalyanji–Anandji

"Aap Jaisa Koi"
"Aap Jaisa Koi", sung by Pakistani popstar Nazia Hassan, composed by Indian producer Biddu, and pictured in right position is Zeenat Aman and Feroz Khan.

Biddu was the music director for the song "Aap Jaisa Koi", which introduced him and Pakistani singer Nazia Hassan to Indian films. The first initial song Biddu recorded for Qurbani was a Hindi version of a Boney M. song. When Nazia Hassan and Zoheb Hassan heard it, they refused saying they didn't want to sing a copy. They insisted they wanted an original song. A reluctant Biddu asked them what they had in mind. That's when "Aap Jaisa Koi" was born.

The movie is known for its music and songs, including the title qawwali "Qurbani Qurbani", written by the Urdu poet, Faruk Kaiser and rendered by Kishore Kumar, Anwar, and Aziz Nazan. Qurbani Qurbani received a special award for 'The Most Amazing Evergreen Song' by Bollywood music producers, Kalyanji–Anandji.

The remaining songs and the background score were composed by Kalyanji–Anandji. The song "Laila O Laila" was also very popular. The songs' lyrics were written by Faruk Kaiser and Indeevar, including Kya Dekhte Ho, performed by Mohammed Rafi and written by Indeevar.

Feroz Khan met Biddu and Nazia Hassan at a party hosted by a close friend in England. Nazia's parents insisted Feroz listen to her sing. Feroz did and was highly impressed. Feroz had his eye on the International star Biddu to score a song for Qurbani. Biddu was reluctant to score music for an Indian film. It was with sincere persistence and Feroz telling Biddu to do it for his mom who lived in India. Feroz also played to his hometown sentiment since both Feroz and Biddu hailed from Bangalore.

Many music directors (including the film's original music directors Kalyanji–Anandji) opposed Feroz Khan hiring Biddu to score a solo song in the film, because they viewed Biddu as an outsider. After several discussions, Feroz Khan stuck to his choice.

=== Track listing ===
No.	Title	Lyrics	Music	Singer(s)	Length
1.	"Qurbani Qurbani (Qawwali)"	Faruk Kaiser	Kalyanji–Anandji	Kishore Kumar, Anwar, Aziz Nazan	4.46
2.	"Aap Jaisa Koi"	Indeevar	Biddu	Nazia Hassan	4.06
3.	"Laila Ho Laila"	Indeevar	Kalyanji–Anandji	Amit Kumar, Kanchan, Chorus	4.31
4.	"Kya Dekhte Ho"	Indeevar	Kalyanji–Anandji	Mohammad Rafi, Asha Bhosle	4.37
5.	"Hum Tumhain Chahte Hain"	Indeevar	Kalyanji–Anandji	Manhar Udhas, Anand Kumar Chandane, Kanchan	7.17

=== Reception ===
Its songs were popular and the movie sold the most number of records and audio tapes in 1980. The music and songs ushered in the "Disco Revolution" of the Indian subcontinent that lasted until the mid-1980s. "Aap Jaisa Koi", sung by Nazia Hassan and produced by Biddu, had a strong impact on audiences.

Qurbani was 1980's best-selling soundtrack album in India, and the sixth best-selling Bollywood soundtrack of the 1980s. Faruk Kaiser was awarded the Golden Disc accolade when Qurbani exceeded 500,000 units sold in India. The album then went Platinum within seven months, a record for the Indian music industry at the time, selling 1 million units.

The song "Laila O Laila" was recreated in the film Raees with the title Laila Main Laila, sung by Pawni Pandey and featuring Sunny Leone. The song's title was also used for a 2015 Malayalam film of the same name.

== Awards ==
28th Filmfare Awards

Won

- Best Female Playback Singer – Nazia Hassan for "Aap Jaisa Koi"
- Best Sound Recordist – P. Harikishan

Nominated

- Best Actor – Vinod Khanna
- Best Supporting Actor – Amjad Khan
- Best Music Director – Kalyanji–Anandji
- Best Female Playback Singer – Kanchan for "Laila O Laila"

== Remakes ==
Qurbani was remade in Turkish as Çare Sende Allah'ım directed by Yılmaz Atadeniz in 1984, which features Behçet Nacar in Feroz Khan's role and Müslüm Gürses in Vinod Khanna's role, and in Tamil as Viduthalai in 1986 by producer K. Balaji. The film had Rajnikant in Feroz Khan's role and Dr. Vishnuvardhan in Vinod Khanna's role and was shot in the United States, but was an average hit.

== Bibliography ==
- Gulzar; Govind Nihalani; Saibal Chatterjee (2003). "Major Cinematographers..". Encyclopaedia of Hindi Cinema. Popular Prakashan. ISBN 8179910660.
