= Young Tarang =

Studio album by Nazia and Zoheb
- Released: 1983 (Pakistan); 24 December 1984 (worldwide)
- Genre: Pakistani pop
- Label: CBS
- Producer: Biddu

Nazia and Zoheb chronology
Star/Boom Boom (1982)	Young Tarang (1983)	Hotline (1987)

Young Tarang is the third studio album by the Pakistani pop duo Nazia and Zoheb, consisting of Nazia Hassan and Zoheb Hassan. The music was composed by Zoheb and British-Indian producer Biddu, with lyrics written by Nazia and Zoheb.

It was first released in Pakistan in 1983, then worldwide in 1984. It was also the first South Asian album to feature music videos.

== Music video ==
Amit Khanna directed "Zara Chera Tu Dekhao", "Sunn" and "Dosti". He used three cameras to shoot the videos. After this the team went to London and recorded four videos with the famous set designer and director, John King, who was also the set designer of Michael Jackson's "Thriller". Amit and John worked on "Pyar Ka Jadu", "Dum Dum Dede", "Ankhien Milane Wale" and "Aag".

== Reception ==
In 1983, EMI awarded it a Platinum disc for exceeding 150,000 cassette sales in Pakistan. The album went on to become a success in India, and in South East Asia, where it was awarded a Double Platinum Disc. The Hong Kong magazine Asiaweek reported that the album sold 100,000 cassettes in its first three weeks, with demand remaining consistent afterwards.

Over thirty years later, an India Today article titled "Nazia makes a lovely comeback" celebrated Nazia Hassan's music appearing in the cult 2012 film, Miss Lovely that had premiered at the Cannes Film Festival: "The film has made the audience nostalgic over Ahluwalia's use of the song "Dum dum de de" from Hassan's 1984 album, Young Tarang." Miss Lovely director, Ashim Ahluwalia, described keeping the original track untouched: "The song symbolises the '80s and the lyrics of the song were in sync with the mood of the film. [We] retained the original voice of Nazia. We didn't want to remix this song because the original was perfect."

== Songs ==
1. Aag - Nazia Hassan
2. Dum Dum Dede - Nazia Hassan
3. Chehra - Zoheb Hassan
4. Kya Howa - Nazia Hassan
5. Dosti - Nazia Hassan & Zoheb Hassan
6. Ashanti - Zoheb Hassan
7. Sunn - Nazia Hassan
8. Medley - Instrumental
9. Ankhien Milane Wale - Nazia Hassan
10. Pyar Ka Jadu - Zoheb Hassan

== Music by ==
- Zohaib Hassan
- Biddu

== Lyrics by ==
- Nazia Hassan
- Zoheb Hassan
- Sehba Akhtar
- Amit Khanna

== Certifications and sales ==
Certifications and sales for "Young Tarang"
Region	Certification	Certified units/sales
Pakistan (EMI Pakistan)	Platinum	150,000
Summaries
South East Asia (EMI)	2× Platinum	
