= Star/Boom Boom =

"Boom Boom"

Single by Nazia & Zoheb Hassan
- Released: 1982
- Genre: Pakistani pop • Hi-NRG
- Label: EMI India
- Producer: Biddu

"Boom Boom" is a single by Pakistani pop duo Nazia and Zoheb (Nazia Hassan and Zohaib Hassan), released in 1982. The song was written by Indeevar for the Bollywood film Star. The album was composed by British-Indian producer Biddu. "Boom Boom" appeared as the title track of Nazia and Zoheb's 1982 album Boom Boom.

The music was a blend of Eastern and Western music, and the album enjoyed the same success as the duo's previous album, Disco Deewane (1981). The single was re-released as Boom Boom in 1984 in Pakistan With Star (Movie) Tracks , It was later re-released as a Compilation album by Saregama in 2004. The album, along with several other albums from Biddu and the Hassan duo, contributed to the creation of the Indi-pop market.

== Production ==
According to Biddu, he showed the film's producers various tracks, "including one surefire hit called 'Boom Boom'. To add to the pot, Nazia Hassan and her brother Zoheb were going to sing all the songs for the soundtrack. The record company was thrilled. They sensed a hit album on their hands, as the brother–sister duo was extremely popular with the masses." The album was produced before the film's Hindi screenplay had been written.

The song "Nigahon Say Door" from the film, sung by Nazia and composed by Biddu, was not included in the Boom Boom album, whereas "Khushi (Teri Hai Meri Khushi)" was included in the album, but was not featured in the film.

== Reception ==
India Today gave the album Star a positive review in 1982. They stated, "Now a brand new, smash hit album by the superstars of Disco Deewane!" They added, "If Disco Deewane set your pulse racing, then here's something that will blow your mind" and concluded "Star will make your heart go boom boom! Star will make you feel like ooee ooie! Star is like nothing you've heard before." The title track "Boom Boom" in particular was well received.

Retrospectively, The Herald in 2006 called Boom Boom one of the duo's "great efforts" along with Disco Deewane, compared to later solo Zohaib Hassan albums such as Kismat (2006). In 2010, the Wired and Rolling Stone music critic Geeta Dayal, in a retrospective feature on South Asia's early disco and electronic dance music, described "Boom Boom" as one of the region's "epic synthesizer tracks" of the early 1980s. She noted that it has a resemblance to Donna Summer's "I Feel Love" (1977), but with a "galloping bassline"; she described Nazia Hassan as South Asia's Donna Summer and Biddu as the region's Giorgio Moroder.

== Track listing ==
- Composition: Biddu
- Lyrics: Indeevar, Amit Khanna

According to the Pakistan release:

1. "Boom Boom" — Nazia Hassan
2. "Ooee Ooee" — Zohaib Hassan
3. "Jana" — Nazia Hassan & Zohaib Hassan
4. "Zindagi" — Zohaib Hassan
5. "Muskuraye Ja" — Zohaib Hassan
6. "Star" — Zohaib Hassan
7. "Khushi" — Nazia Hassan
8. "Dheree Dheree" — Zohaib Hassan
9. "Koi Nahin" — Nazia Hassan

== Remix album ==
Biddu produced a remix album named as 'Boom Boom - The Biddu Experience, released in 1995 under the label of Magnasound. It topped the Indian charts, selling 150,000 units in less than a month. The title song "Boom Boom" was accompanied by a new music video.

== Cover versions ==
W.i.S.H. released a reimagined version of "Boom Boom" produced by Mikey McCleary and Parth Parekh. The new added rap verses also written by the members of W.i.S.H.
