= W.i.S.H. =

Indian girl group

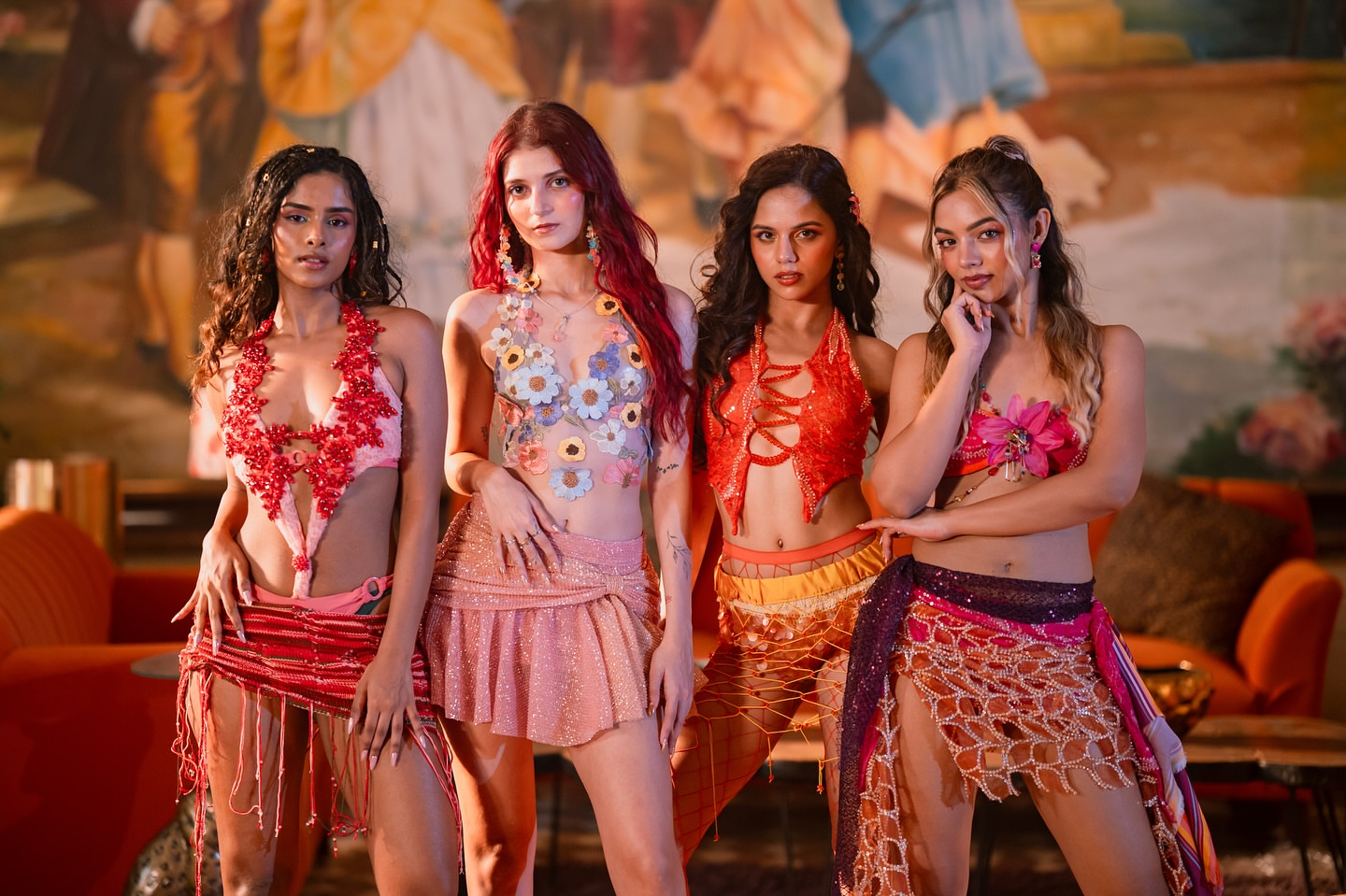
- W.i.S.H. in July 2025; From Left to Right: Suchi, Zo, Sim and Ri

Background information
- Origin: India
- Genre: I-pop • Pop • Disco
- Years active: 2024–present
- Labels: Bay Music House; Sony Music India
- Members: Ri; Sim; Zo; Suchi
- Website: Official website

WiSH (stylised as W.i.S.H.) is an Indian pop girl group formed and managed by Bay Music House. The group consists of four members: Ri, Sim, Zo, and Suchi. They debuted on 1 March 2024 with the single “Lazeez” which was part of their debut eight-track album Sweetburn. The group incorporates a mix of English and Hindi lyrics, blending international pop music with elements of Indian traditional music.

== Name ==
W.i.S.H. is an acronym for the phrase "World Inka Stage Hai " (Hindi: वर्ल्ड इनका स्टेज है, lit. 'The world is their stage').

== History ==
=== Pre-Debut activities ===
Two years before their official debut under Dreampop Entertainment, Bay Music House, and Sony Music India in March 2024, all the members were collaborating to form a girl group.

In 2024, music composer Mikey McCleary announced the formation of the all-girl I-pop group W.i.S.H. McCleary stated that the project was conceived to bridge the gap between mainstream Bollywood music and India's independent music scene.

Ri and Sim, who are sisters, previously performed together as the pop duo Simetri. Ri is the leader of W.i.S.H. Zo, was previously part of the musical duo Zoe & Urgen. She also appeared on the reality television series The Stage. Suchi, previously worked in a production-house desk role.

McCleary contacted the members individually over a period of time, beginning with Ri, followed by Sim, Suchi, and Zo. Some were approached through prior professional associations, while others were invited after their performances or online content were noted by the production team.

=== March 2024—December 2024: Debut with Lazeez, Galti, Therapy, Headrush, Boom Boom ===
Music composer Mikey McCleary launched the all-girl I-pop group W.i.S.H. in collaboration with Sony Music India. McCleary aims to fill the gap between the mainstream Bollywood music and Indie music.

On March 1, 2024, W.i.S.H. debuted by performing and releasing their first single, "Lazeez".

On September 23, 2024, the International Cricket Council (ICC) released the official theme song for the 2024 ICC Women's T20 World Cup. The tournament's theme song, "Whatever It Takes," was written by W.i.S.H.

A rendition of Boom Boom originally performed by Nazia Hassan in 1982, was published by W.i.S.H. on December 13, 2024 and was produced by Mikey McCleary and Parth Parekh.

=== 2025—present: Bolo Bolo, Sweetburn, Desi Girl ===
W.i.S.H. collaborated with rapper Panther from MTV Hustle for their track Bolo Bolo.

On August 10, 2025, W.i.S.H. released their first full album titled Sweetburn.

== Members ==
- Ri (Riya Duggal)
- Sim (Simran Duggal)
- Zo (Zoe Siddharth)
- Suchi (Suchita Shirke)

== Influences ==
They draw musical influences from Indian musicians such as A. R. Rahman. Suchi has also mentioned admiration for Fifth Harmony. In an interview with India Today on 21 May 2025, South Korean singer, songwriter, rapper, composer, and dancer Kino, who was a member of the boy band Pentagon, stated that he would like to work with W.i.S.H.

Unable to follow the K-pop approach, the band is trying to create their own way.

== Discography ==
=== Albums ===
- "Sweetburn" (2025)

=== Singles ===
Year	Title	Release date	Ref.	Album
2024	Lazeez	1 March 2024		Sweetburn
2024	Galti (ft. MxRZI)	11 April 2024		Sweetburn
2024	Therapy	7 June 2024		Sweetburn
2024	Headrush	24 July 2024		Sweetburn
2024	Whatever It Takes	23 September 2024		Non-album single
2024	Boom Boom	13 December 2024		Non-album single
2025	Bolo Bolo (ft. Panther)	11 July 2025		Sweetburn
2025	Ishaare	August 2025		Sweetburn
2025	Mera Aasmaan	August 2025		Sweetburn
2025	Drameboss	August 2025		Sweetburn
2025	Desi Girl	10 October 2025		Non-album single
2026	Kasoor	7 October 2026		Kasoor/Doori
2026	Doori	7 October 2026		Kasoor/Doori
