= Who's Been Kissing You =

"Who's Been Kissing You" is a 1981 single by the group Hot Cuisine. It was a hit for them that year. "Who's Been Kissing You" was written by Biddu, Winston Sela and Ron Roker.

Years later, the song was recorded by the group SouLutions and became a hit for them.

== Hot Cuisine version ==
"Who's Been Kissing You"

12", 33 ⅓ RPM single by Hot Cuisine
- A-side: "Who's Been Kissing You"
- B-side: "Live My Life"
- Released: 1981
- Length: 5:30
- Label: Prelude Records PRLD 613-AS
- Composers: Biddu, Sela, Roker
- Producer: Biddu

UK chronology
"Dancin' Me to Ecstasy" (1980)	"Who's Been Kissing You" (1981)	"Skunkin'" (1981)

=== Background ===
Francois Kevorkian was the A&R director for Prelude Records. He was quoted in the 12 September 1981 issue of Record World as saying that publicity chief Michael Gomes bought Hot Cuisine to the attention of himself and the label.

The recording was released in the United States in 12" format on Prelude Records PRL D 613 in 1981. The three credited composers of the song were, Biddu, Winston Sela and Ron Roker. Buddu produced the song.

Prelude Records had obtained the recording which was licensed from Kaleidoscope Records in Europe.

Joey Bonner, Prelude's national promotional director was working to promote the record in the US. He was setting up plays in the US for the Cuisine single as well as the latest by The Nick Straker Band..

The follow up for "Who's Been Kissing You" was originally "Skunkin'". However, the B side "Disco Calypso" was remixed and it emerged as the A side.

The song was sampled by Loredana Bertè for her "In Alto Mare" song.

=== Reception ===
In the 15 August issue of Record World, Nelson George wrote in his Black Music Report referred to Hot Cuisine as "another faceless disco aggregation" on the Prelude Record label. He also wrote that it was a fine mid-tempo dance tune that had an easy groove and referred to the break as being right out of "Another One Bites the Dust" but was different enough to be entertaining on its own and it had real pop appeal. He was surprised to learn that it was produced by Biddu who he referred to as the "Euro-disco schlock master".

For the week of 29 August, Billboard contributor Barry Leder wrote in his Disco Mix column that "Who's Been Kissing You" by Hot Cusisine and "Body Music by the Strikers were two Prelude groups that were just hitting the charts. He also wrote that "Who's Been Kissing You" had a steady beat and was lent to evening play and the vocals and arrangement had a soft R&B feel, and the drum break adding punch to it.

=== Airplay ===
As recorded in the 15 August issue of Billboard, "Who's Been Kissing You" was a Top Add On at WXLO in New York. The single was a double prime mover at WXLO for the week of 29 August. The record was still a double prime mover at WXLO for the week of 5 September.

=== US charts ===
==== Billboard ====
The 12" version of "Who's Been Kissing You" (Prelude PRLD-613) debuted at No. 70 on the Billboard Top 80 Disco chart for the week of 22 August 1981. In the single's seventh charting week, it peaked at No. 31 for the week of 3 October. At week ten, for the week of 24 October it was still in the chart at No. 75.

==== Cash Box ====
===== Black Contemporary Top 100 =====
For the week of 29 August, the 7-inch version of "Who's Been Kissing You" debuted at No. 95 on the Cash Box Black Contemporary Top 100 chart. For the week of 3 October, the single was at its seventh charting week. It peaked at No. 57. It held that position for an additional week. It was still on the chart for the week of 24 August.

===== Dance Dance Dance Top Ten / Dance Music Chart Top Fifteen =====
For the week of 15 August the 12" version debuted in the Cash Box Dance Dance Dance Top Ten chart. By 5 September the chart had been re-named to Dance Music Chart with subsections; Top Ffiteen, Top Breakout and Breakouts. For that week, "Who's Been Kissing You" was at No. 4 on the Dance Music Chart. For the week of 19 September it had fallen down to No. 6. The following week it had fallen off the chart. It reappeared at No. 13 for the week of 3 October.

==== Record World ====
===== Disco File Top 40 =====
The 12" version (Given at the time as Prelude PRLD 612) of "Who's Been Kissing You" debuted at No. 31 on the Record World Disco File Top 40 chart for the week of 22 August. It peaked at No. 20 for the week of 19 September. It was still on the chart at No. 39 for the week of 3 October.

- Note Prelude PRLD is actually the cat no. for "A Little Bit of Jazz" by Nick Straker Band which was in the same chart.

===== Singles 101-150 =====
The 7-inch version of "Who's Been Kissing You" (Prelude PRL 8035) debuted at No. 112 on the Record World Singles 101-150 chart for the week of 5 September. It peaked at No. 106 for the week of 3 October. The record was still charting for the week of 7 November.

===== Black Oriented Singles =====
The 7-inch single (Prelude 8035) debuted at No. 61 on the Record World Black Oriented Singles for the week of 12 September. It was also selected as the Chartmaker of the Week. At week seven, it peaked at No. 40 for the week of 24 October.

=== Smash Hits ===
For the 2 week period of April 30-May 13, 1981, "Who's Been Kissing You" debuted at No. 39 on the Smash Hits Disco Top 40 chart.

=== Record Business ===
For the week of 27 April 1981, the 12-inch version of "Who's Been Kissing You" (Kaleidoscope KRLA(12) 1105Z) debuted at No. 39 on the Record Business Indie Top 50 chart.

== SouLutions version ==
"Who's Been Kissing You"

CD single by SouLutions

from the album Fate
- A-side: "Who's Been Kissing You"
- Released: 2019
- Length: 3:44
- Label: Festival Park Productions

=== Background ===
SouLutions recorded "Who's Been Kissing You". The recording was produced by Louise Mehan and Steve Lee. It is from the act's third studio album, Fate which was released in March 2019.

The song is included on the Luxury Soul 2020 compilation that was released on Expansion Records in 2020.

=== Reception ===
It was reported by Bill Buckley for Soul and Jazz and Funk on 12 March 2019 that "Who's Been Kissing You" was already topping many of the credible European soul charts.

=== Charts ===
The single reached No. 1 on the Solar Radio Sweet Rhythms Chart.
