= Disco Se Aagay =

- Cover used on 1985 Music India and 2021 Discostan releases

Studio album by Nermin Niazi and Feisal Mosleh
- Released: September 1984
- Studio: Zella Recording Studios
- Genre: New wave; synthpop; disco
- Label: Sirocco

Disco Se Aagay (commonly translated as Beyond Disco) is a 1984 British new wave album by the British Pakistani sister-brother duo Nermin Niazi and Feisal Mosleh. The only album that they produced and released, it initially received relatively little notice at release. However, its remaster and re-release by the record label Discostan in 2021 caused it to gain more mainstream attention for combining British new wave, synthpop and disco with Urdu lyrics and Hindustani music as well as the background and experiences of the artists as British Pakistanis.

== Background and release history ==
Nermin Niazi and Feisal Mosleh are siblings who migrated to the United Kingdom from Pakistan as children with their parents in the aftermath of the Bangladesh Liberation War. Their family has been involved in South Asian music for generations, including their parents, who are the composer Muslehuddin and playback singer Naheed Niazi. In this environment, both spent a significant amount of time in recording studios in Pakistan, remained connected to music during their parents' UK tours, and interacted with "the biggest names in Pakistani pop", such as Nazia Hassan, when they visited the country. Eventually, Mosleh started trying out various instruments, playing the keyboard and his father's string orchestra, and Niazi joined in to hum along, leading to the duo forming a songwriting collaboration where Mosleh worked with the instruments and Niazi was the lead vocalist. Noticing this, their father got in touch with Oriental Star Agencies, who offered the siblings a chance to record an Urdu album.

The album was recorded at Zella Studios during summer break, when Mosleh was 19 and Niazi was 14. Influenced by both traditional South Asian music as well as British new wave acts, Roland June-60 and Yamaha DX7 synthesisers were combined with Hindustani melodic scales to produce the album's sound. It was released in September 1984, shortly before Niazi went back to school, and was the only release ever issued by the duo. A variant was released with a new cover and a reprise of "Sari Sari Raat" on the B-side by Music India in 1985.

It was re-released by Discostan on 22 January 2021 as the first album on their label. Later that year, Discostan released Disco Se Aagay: Edits and Reprises on 24 September, which comprises two tracks edited by DJ Moving Still, two previously unreleased "experimental reprises" and another song's English version.

== Reception and themes ==
Initially, the album gained some publicity in England and Pakistan, leading to Mosleh and Niazi being featured on TV and newspapers as well as conducting some performances on stage. There was also some controversy in Pakistan due to the lyrical content as the country was becoming increasingly Islamisised, with conservatives displeased by a teenager singing about love. Niazi also stated that her teachers requested her to perform the album at school, where she performed "to over 900 school girls who danced in their seats and screamed through excitement". However, sources have described the album as ultimately fizzling to obscurity after a while, due to a lack of promotion and the fusion style not being received well at the time, with the album being considered "too eastern for the West and too western for the East". A copy of the album was later found by Arshia Haq, the founder of Discostan, who remastered it and issued that version in 2021. This release had a bigger impact, and more attention was brought to the album and the artists.

Significant attention has been drawn between the album and the siblings' British Pakistani heritage. The Guardian described it as "a candid expression of the dual personality millions of members of the diaspora are forced to address during their teenage years. The Urdu lyrics and south Asian pop stylings represent the comfort and familiarity of their upbringing; the synth-driven energy signifies the allure of western culture and desire to break the mould." In a positive review with a score of 7.4 for Pitchfork, Philip Sherburne noted that "British new wave is typically framed as a story of the democratization of pop music... Still, despite these democratic pretenses, the history of new wave has hardly been inclusive; the kids in its telling are almost invariably white. Disco Se Aagay challenges that assumed homogeneity."

== Track listing ==
Side one
No.	Title	Length
1.	"Dekha Jab Se Dekha"	5:00
2.	"Hum Tum"	3:17
3.	"Nainan"	4:12
4.	"Chala Hai Akela"	4:23
5.	"Sari Sari Raat"	4:35

Side two
No.	Title	Length
1.	"Taron Bhare"	5:58
2.	"Nazneen"	5:19
3.	"Intezaar"	3:22
4.	"Dil Mein Dil Mein"	4:44

Additional side two track (1985 Music India and 2021 Discostan releases)
No.	Title	Length
1.	"Sari Sari Raat (reprise)"

Disco Se Aagay: Edits and Reprises
No.	Title	Length
1.	"Nermin Niazi and Feisal Mosleh/Moving Still - Sari Sari Raat (Moving Still Edit)"	6:17
2.	"Nermin Niazi and Feisal Mosleh/Moving Still - Hum Tum (Moving Still Edit)"	5:04
3.	"Dekha Jab Se Dekha (1984 Reprise)"	5:02
4.	"Hum Tum (1984 Reprise)"	3:23
5.	"Tonight (Nainan English Version)"	4:16
