= Saaya (1989 film) =

- Promotional Poster
- Directed by: Keshu Ramsay credited as R. Keshu
- Screenplay by: Kumar Ramsay
- Story by: Kumar Ramsay
- Produced by: Naval Kumar
- Starring: Shatrughan Sinha; Poonam Dhillon; Kajal Kiran; Danny Denzongpa
- Cinematography: S. Pappu
- Edited by: Bal Korde
- Music by: Bappi Lahiri
- Release date: 14 April 1989
- Country: India
- Language: Hindi

Saaya is a 1989 Indian Hindi-language film directed by Keshu Ramsay and produced by Naval Kumar. The film has Shatrughan Sinha, Poonam Dhillon, Kajal Kiran, Danny Denzongpa in pivotal roles and music by Bappi Lahiri.

== Cast ==
- Shatrughan Sinha as SP Ravi
- Poonam Dhillon as Supriya
- Kajal Kiran as Ruby
- Danny Denzongpa as Rakesh
- Pinchoo Kapoor as Bhargav, Supriya's father
- Viju Khote as Traffic Police Damodar
- Beena Banerjee as Beena

== Songs ==
The Lyricist for the film is Anjaan.

Song	Singer
"Janamdin Mubarak Ho"	Asha Bhosle
"Hey Shiva Shankar"	Mohammed Aziz
"Zindagi Ka Safar" - 1	Mohammed Aziz
"Zindagi Ka Safar" - 2	Mohammed Aziz
"Malik Mere, Tune Mujhko"	Uttara Kelkar
"Aap Aaye To Shukriya, Dil Mein Aaye To Shukriya"	Nazia Hassan, Zoheb Hassan
