= Ahmad Haseeb =

Documentary film producer and director

- Born: 8 November 1983 (age 43); Lahore, Punjab, Pakistan
- Occupations: Television producer, television director

Ahmad Haseeb is a film director and producer. Haseeb won the Best Documentary award at Kara Film Festival in 2007 for A Music Fairy, a short subject about pop icon Nazia Hassan. Haseeb also directed rock group Junoon's music video "Rooh ki pyas" (non-commercial) as a college project. In 2006 Haseeb received a master's degree in Multimedia Arts from National College of Arts Lahore. Haseeb has worked as a producer for Waqt TV but joined city42 later. Ahmad Haseeb also composed and produced a cricket World Cup song "Aya Hai World cup" with Cllr Sitarah Anjum and Rehan Naseer released on 24 February 2011.

== See also ==
- Nazia Hassan
- A Music Fairy
