= Aap Jaisa Koi =

Song by Nazia Hassan

from the album Qurbani
- Language: Hindi-Urdu
- Released: 1979
- Recorded: 1979
- Genre: Disco
- Length: 3:45
- Composer: Biddu
- Lyricist: Indeevar

Audio sample
- file; help

Music video
- "Aap Jaisa Koi" on YouTube

"Aap Jaisa Koi" (transl. Someone like you) is a song from the 1979 soundtrack of the 1980 Indian film Qurbani. It was the debut song of Pakistani singer Nazia Hassan, and was composed by British Indian producer Biddu. The song was featured in the film as an item number, picturised on Zeenat Aman. It has been remixed and sampled by many other artists.

The song was a big hit, and gained cult status in India and Pakistan. It was a filmi disco song that revolutionized Pakistani pop, Indi-pop, and Bollywood music.

== History ==
Feroz Khan was a famous leading actor of Bollywood in the early 1960s. As time passed, he became a director and he acted as a leading actor in many of his films and most of his films of the 1960s and 1970s were hit at the box office. After two decades of popularity as an actor and director, Feroz made another film, Qurbani (1980). He wanted to create a new song titled "Aap Jaisa Koi" for the film. Zeenat Aman introduced the 15-year-old Nazia Hassan, a UK-based Pakistani to Feroz. Nazia was a child singer in Pakistan during the 1970s. Feroz wasn't keen on using Nazia’s voice initially but with some convincing from Zeenat, he heard her sing. She was offered to sing "Aap Jaisa Koi" and she accepted the offer. She provided the vocals for the song. It was recorded at a length of 3 minutes and 45 seconds. The video of the song was recorded as an item number by the leading actress of Hindi cinema Zeenat Aman.

== Reception ==
"Aap Jaisa Koi" became a superhit song in India and overseas and Qurbani became a hit film at the box office. The singer of this song Nazia Hassan, gained overnight fame in India and also became famous in her own country, Pakistan. "Aap Jaisa Koi" marked the first time that a Pakistani singer sang in an Indian film.

The Qurbani album went Platinum within seven months, a record for the Indian Music Industry at the time, exceeding a million sales. The song became so popular that Nazia, despite being a Pakistani, won the Indian Filmfare Award for Best Female Playback Singer for this song in 1981. She set the record for being the youngest recipient of the award at the age of 15.

== Popular culture ==
"Aap Jaisa Koi" was first covered by Bollywood singer Shaan, who was one of the first Indian male singer to cover original female vocal songs. It was featured in his album Naujawan in 1996.

Later, it was covered by the South Asian a cappella group Penn Masala, and their cover was featured in the 2001 American film, American Desi, a year after Nazia Hassan's untimely death due to cancer.

Harry Anand produced a remix of the song for his 2004 Sweet Honey Mix album, released under the T-Series label. Sung by Sophie Choudry, the remix had a music video starring Negar Khan. The song was also used in the 2016 Trinidadian film Bazodee.

This song was recreated by Tanishk Bagchi for Ayushmann Khurrana’s An Action Hero. It featured Malaika Arora.
