= Ken Gnanakan =

Indian educator, environmentalist and theologian

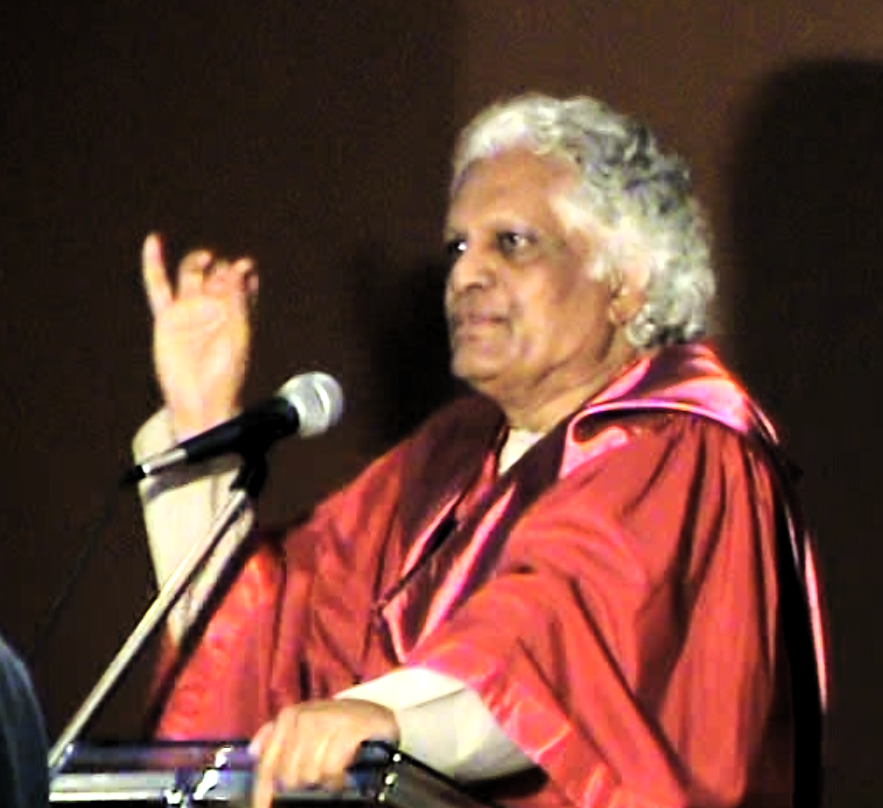
Ken Gnanakan at the ACTS Academy Convocation 2007, Bangalore

Kenneth Romesh Gnanakan (1940–2021), popularly known as Ken Gnanakan, was an Indian educator, environmentalist and theologian. He was the General Secretary of Asia Theological Association from 1990 to 2000. He was a frequent speaker worldwide at workshops, seminars and conferences.

Gnanakan was the founder and chancellor of ACTS Group of Institutions, a social organisation with a focus on education. He was the Chairman of ETASI, as well as the Chairman of the International Council for Higher Education, Switzerland. He was also the Vice President of the Global Challenges Forum (GCF), Switzerland and an Advisor to the United Nations Institute of Training and Research (UNITAR), Geneva. He taught in India and in other parts of the world on varied subjects such as management, environment, education, entrepreneurship, theology, and philosophy. Gnanakan was married to Prema and they had two children, Santosh and Anupa. Ken Gnanakan died on 9 May 2021, following a massive heart attack.

== Writings ==
Ken Gnanakan has written extensively on various issues. At present he propagates the concept of "Integrated Learning" in Africa and Asia through workshops based on his books and articles. He has written an introductory certificate course in health and environment as well as several courses on NGO Management for the Indira Gandhi National Open University (IGNOU), headquartered in New Delhi. His text books on Theology and Philosophy are being used in various parts of the world.

His book "Trees" - a collection of poems on environmental issues - is being used in various schools. Gnanakan's story of his conversion, theological studies, and pioneering of the ACTS institute is narrated in his autobiography Still Learning: A Personal Story (1995).

== Projects ==
Gnanakan initiated the Programme for Environmental Awareness in Schools (PEAS), a nationwide network aimed at motivating students into action. The programme initially funded by CIDA has hundreds of schools networked in an environmental movement bringing together thousands of children from all over the country.

Gnanakan pioneered the use of waste plastics for road surfacing in India. He has collaborated with European ecologists to develop a model eco-toilet for slums. At present he is engaged in developing a holistic model of socio-economic development starting with the collection of urban waste. The model includes the generation of cooking gas as well as electricity.

After completing his Ph.D. in philosophy at King's College London and returning to India, he and his wife Prema set up the ACTS Institute, a vocational training school, which also imparted practical skills and spiritual values to young people. The institute took the couple into needy areas in slums and villages, and gradually grew to become a large network of education, health and environmental projects, all over India under the banner of ACTS.

Ken Gnanakan was widely connected all over the world with academic and social programs. He was the Chancellor of ACTS Group of Institutions (India); Chairman of the International Council for Higher Education (Switzerland), a Member of the International Association for Promotion of Christian Higher Education, USA.

Ken Gnanakan has attended and spoken at various UN forums. One of his recent books is "Wellness and Wellbeing", which is one of UN’s Sustainability Goals.

== Music ==
Gnanakan was also an accomplished musician and used to be a part of the "Trojans". The band known as "the Indian Beatles" kept Bangalore, Calcutta and Bombay swinging in the '60s and included Biddu, a prominent pop musician. He has produced various CDs of his Christian spiritual compositions. He has written an environmental theme song sung by children all over the country.

== Major writings ==
Books authored by Gnanakan include:

- Kingdom Concerns - Theological Book Trust (1989 and 1993)
- Still Learning: A Personal Story - ACTS Trust (1991)
- The Pluralistic Predicament - Theological Book Trust
- Biblical Theology in Asia - (Editor) ATA Books (1995)
- Trees: Poems on the Environment - Bridge Books
- Managing Yourself - ACTS Books
- Proclaiming Christ in a Pluralistic Context - Theological Book Trust
- God's Word: A Theology of the Environment - SPCK (1999)
- Responsible Stewardship of God's Creation - Theological Commission of the World Evangelical Alliance (2004)
- Learning in an Integrated Environment (ICHE Books)
- Integrated Learning - Oxford University Press
- Managing Your Organization - Theological Book Trust (2011)
- The Whole Gospel of God - Theological Book Trust (2014)
- Living and Learning - Theological Book Trust (2015)
- "Wellness and Wellbeing" - Theological Book Trust (2016)
