= Disco Calypso =

Song by Hot Cuisine
- A-side: "Disco Calypso"
- B-side: "Skunkin"
- Released: 1981
- Label: Kaleidoscope Records Limited
- Producer: Biddu

UK chronology
"Skunkin'" (1981)	"Disco Calypso" (1981)	"Ride on a Rhythm" (1982)

"Disco Calypso" is a 1981 single by UK disco group Hot Cuisine. It was a hit on the UK Disco chart that year.

== Background ==
"Disco Calypso" started out as the B side of "Skunkin". It was remixed and released as the A side. Both sides were produced by Biddu.

The remix was released on Kaleidoscope Records Limited KRLA 1661 in November 1981.

== Reception ==
"Skunkin'" was reviewed by James Hamilton in the 17 October issue of Record Mirror. He was unimpressed with the song and referred to it as a boring ponderous jiggy 111-113bpm 12inch smacker that even chipmunks could lighten. He did write that the Linx inspired flip "Disco Calypso" was better.

"Disco Calypso" was reviewed in the 28 November issue of Record Mirror. Making note of "Disco Calypso" now being the A side, James Hamilton referred to the record as a home-grown stab at disco exoticism. He also noted the salsa intro and the rhythm breaks enlivened what was an otherwise looped loping beat.

Disco Savvy refers to the song as electro-disco.

== Charts ==
Along with "Never Give Up on a Good Thing" by George Benson, "California Style" by Eddie Grant and others, "Disco Calypso" was one of the Breakers bubbling under the Disco 90 chart for the week of 7 November.

Disco Calypso debuted at No. 74 on the Record Mirror UK Disco chart for the week of 14 November 1981. It peaked at No. 36 for the week of 28 November. It was still in the chart at No. 73 for the week of 9 January 1982.
