= Indeevar =

Indian film lyricist (1924–1997)

- Born: Shyamalal Babu Rai; 1 January 1924; Jhansi, Uttar Pradesh, India
- Died: 27 February 1997 (aged 73); Mumbai, Maharashtra, India
- Occupation: Lyricist

Shyamalal Babu Rai, known professionally as Indeevar (also credited as Indiwar and Indeewar), (1 January 1924 – 27 February 1997) was one of the leading Hindi film lyricists from the 1960s to the mid-1990s.

== Early life ==
He was born and grew up in Barua Sagar of Jhansi district of Uttar Pradesh. He moved to Mumbai to pursue a professional career as a lyricist.

== Career ==
He got recognition with Malhar in 1951, where he penned "Bade Armano Se Rakkha Hai Balam Teri Kasam", which was set to music by Roshan. He wrote more than a thousand songs for over 300 films in a career spanning over four decades. Indeevar also wrote songs for famous pop duo of siblings Nazia Hassan and Zohaib Hassan. Nazia's famous songs "Aap Jaisa Koi", "Boom Boom", "Meherbani", "Dil ki Lagi" & Zohaib's "Star" were written by Indeevar.

== Major Hits ==
Tumse Badhkar Duniya Mai (Kaamchor)

Tujhe Dekhkar Jagwaale Par (Sawan Ko Aane Do)

Pyar Hamara Amar Rahega (Muddat)

Ye bandhan to pyar ka (Karan Arjun)

Na Kajre Ki Dhaar (mohra)

Parmatma hai pyare (parmatma)

Nile Nile Ambar Par (Kalakaar)

Bade aarmano se rakhha hai (Malhar)

Roshan tumhi se duniya (Parasmani)

Paas baitho tabiyat (Punarmilan)

Hum ne tujhko pyar kiya hai (Dulha Dulhan)

Jo pyar tu ne mujhko diya tha (Dulha Dulhan)

Jis dil me basa tha pyar (Saheli)

Waqt karta jo wafa (Dil Ne Pukaara)

Har Khushi ho wahan (Upkaar)

Kasme waade pyar wafa (Upkaar)

Phool tumhe bheja hai khat me (Saraswati Chandra)

Chhod de saari duniya kisi ke liye (Saraswati Chandra)

Chandan sa badan (Saraswati Chandra)

Mahlon ka raja mila (Anokhi Raat)

Taal mile nadi ke jal me (Anokhi Raat)

Koi jab tumhara hriday tod de (Purab Aur Paschim)

Hai preet jahan ki reet sada (Purab Aur Paschim)

Darpan ko dekha tu ne (Upaasana)

Yuhin tum mujhse baat karti ho (Sachha Jhoota)

Meri pyaari baheniyan (Sachha Jhoota)

Zindagi ka safar (Safar)

Jeevan se bhari teri aankhen (Safar)

Hum they jin ke sahaare (Safar)

Nadiya chale chale re dhaara (Safar)

Jo tum ko ho pasand (Safar)

Tere hothon ke do phool (Paras)

He re kanhaiya (Chhoti Bahu)

Tum mile pyar se (Apraadh)

Roop tera aaisa darpan me na (Ek Baar Muskura Do)

Savere ka suraj tumhare liye (Ek Baar Muskura Do)

Samjhauta ghamon se kar lo (Samjhauta)

Sab ke rahete lagta hai jaise (Samjhauta)

Dil aaisa kisi ne mera toda (Amaanush)

Har koi chahta hai (Ek Muthhi Aasmaan)

Tere chehre me woh jadoo hai (Dharmatma)

Madhuban khushboo deta hai (Saajan Bina Suhagan)

Hum tumhe chahte hai aaise (Qurbaani)

Jeevan mitaana hai diwaanapan (Aarmaan)

Pyar hi jeene ki soorat hai (Aarmaan)

Hothon se chhoo lo tum (Prem Geet)

Dushman na kare dost ne (Aakhir Kiyun)

Tum Mile Dil Khile (Criminal)

Jab Koi Baat Bigad Jaye (Jurm)

Ek tu na mila (Himalaya ki god me)

== Awards ==
Year	Nominee / work	Award	Result
1966	"Ek Tu Na Mila" (Himalaya Ki God Mein)	Filmfare Best Lyricist Award	Nominated
1974	"Samjhauta Ghamon Se Kar Lo" (Samjhauta)	Filmfare Best Lyricist Award	Nominated
1975	"Behnane Bhai Ki Kalai" (Resham Ki Dori)	Filmfare Best Lyricist Award	Nominated
1976	"Dil Aisa Kisi Ne Mera Toda" (Amanush)	Filmfare Best Lyricist Award	Won
1985	"Pyar Ka Tohfa Tera" (Tohfa)	Filmfare Best Lyricist Award	Nominated

== Discography ==
Year	Film	Songs	Notes
1981	Prem Geet (1981 film)	"Honton se cho lu tum" (and all other songs in this film)	
1994	Vijaypath	"Ladke Aaj Ke Ladke"	
1994	The Gentleman	"Roop Suhana Lagta Hai", "What Is Love"	
1994	Mohra	"Na Kajre Ki Dhar", "Dil Har Koi"	
1994	Criminal	All Songs	
1995	Jawab	"Ek Tak Ant Thak"	
1995	Karan Arjun	All Songs	
1996	Yeh Hai Mumbai Meri Jaan/Mr. Aashiq	All Songs	
1996	Fareb	"Yeh Teri Aankhen Jhuki Jhuki", "Pyar Ka Milna"	
1997	Auzaar	"Dil Ke Sau Tukde"	
1997	Koyla	All Songs	
1997	Imaan Beiman	All Songs	
1998	Ghulam	"Tujhko Kya"	
1998	Kudrat	"Aaj Hoke Rahe Apna Milan", "Ishq Bhala Kya Hai", "Humse Mohabbat Mein", "Main Hoon Albeli", "Tujhe Dene Ko"	
1999	Sarfarosh	"Meri Raton Ki Neendein Uda De"	
2013	Boss	recreated "Har Kisi Ko" from Jaanbaaz	

== See also ==
- Bollywood songs
- Shakeel Badayuni
- Hasrat Jaipuri
- Shankar Jaikishan
- Shailendra
- Majrooh Sultanpuri
- Gulzar
