= Biddu =

Indian composer (born 1945)

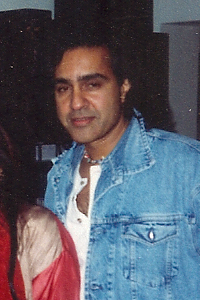
- Biddu pictured in 1994

Background information
- Born: Biddu Appaiah; 8 February 1945 (age 81); Bangalore, Kingdom of Mysore, British India
- Genres: Soul; disco; dance; film score; funk; house; pop; rock; world
- Occupations: Singer; songwriter; producer
- Instrument: Vocals
- Years active: 1960s–present

Biddu Appaiah (born 8 February 1945), known mononymously as Biddu (bɪˈduː, pronounced BID-doo), is an Indian-British singer-songwriter, composer, and music producer who composed and produced many worldwide hit records during a career spanning five decades. Considered one of the pioneers of disco, Euro disco, and Indian pop, he has sold millions of records worldwide, and has received an Ivor Novello award for his work. He has been ranked at number 34 on NME's "The 50 Greatest Producers Ever" list.

== Background ==
Biddu was born in Bangalore, Kingdom of Mysore (Now Karnataka, India). He began his music career in the 1960s, by singing as part of a music band in India before moving to England where he would start his career as a producer. He eventually found some success producing a hit song for Japanese band The Tigers in 1969, scoring the soundtrack for 1972 British film Embassy, and producing several early disco songs that would find a niche audience in British northern soul clubs during the early 1970s.

His international breakthrough came in 1974 with "Kung Fu Fighting" performed by Carl Douglas; the song became one of the best-selling singles of all time with eleven million records sold, helped popularise disco music, was the first worldwide disco hit from Britain and Europe, and established Biddu as one of the most prolific dance music producers from outside the United States at the time. He soon began producing his own instrumental albums under the name Biddu Orchestra, which started an orchestral disco trend in Britain and Europe with 1975 hits "Summer of '42" and "Blue Eyed Soul"; his solo albums eventually sold 40 million copies worldwide. He also launched the careers of other British disco stars such as Tina Charles, helping her sell 36 million records within a few years, and Jimmy James; scored soundtracks for several British films such as The Stud (1978); and produced a hit song for the French singer Claude François. Biddu also experimented with electronic disco and Hi-NRG music from the mid-1970s, and influenced British new wave bands such as The Buggles, founded by two of his former session musicians Trevor Horn and Geoff Downes.

Following the decline of disco in the Western world, he later found success in Asia during the 1980s, where he launched the careers of the late Pakistani pop singer Nazia Hassan and her brother Zoheb; he produced their debut album Disco Deewane, which charted in fourteen countries and became the best-selling Asian pop album up until that time, and helped the duo eventually sell 60 million records worldwide. During that decade, he also produced several hit Bollywood soundtracks for films such as Qurbani (1980) as well as several hit songs for Japanese pop idol Akina Nakamori and Chinese pop singer Samantha Lam (林志美). In the 1990s, he popularised Indian pop with the hit album Made in India (1995), which became the best-selling pop album in India and launched the career of Alisha Chinai, after which he would launch the careers of several more Indian pop acts such as Shaan and his sister Sagarika as well as Sonu Nigam and K.S. Chithra. In the 2000s, Biddu has been active in the Western and Indian music scenes producing albums which are more spiritual and Eastern-oriented. He rearranged a classical hit for Luke Kenny's film, Rise of the Zombie.

On various occasions Biddu has collaborated with Sri-Lankan born musician Winston Sela.

== Early years and career ==
Biddu's family originally hailed from Kodagu in the Karnataka state of India, but he was born and grew up in the city of Bangalore, where he attended the Bishop Cotton Boys' School. He carries the clan name of Chendrimada. In the 1960s, as a youth, he developed a liking for the then new pop and rock music, as he said in a media interview, listening to pop hits played on the shortwave radio band of Radio Ceylon of Ceylon (Sri Lanka), which was then popular throughout Asia. He learnt to play the guitar and in his late teens and early twenties he frequented the clubs and bars of Bangalore, and soon started a music band called 'Trojans' with a few friends, including Ken Gnanakan, who later went on to start an NGO called "ACTS". The band was India's first English-speaking band, and found success playing cover versions of The Beatles, The Rolling Stones, Trini Lopez and hits of other Western stars of the day, in the clubs of Bangalore and also other Indian cities, such as Calcutta—where they even held a recurring performance slot at Trincas for a period—and Bombay. The band, however, split since Ken Gnanakan wanted to pursue higher studies, leaving Biddu alone as the sole member of the band. He played under the name 'Lone Trojan' and was popular as an act at a night club called "Venice" in Bombay.

Biddu held an interest for bigger things in popular music, and in 1967 left for England. He traveled through the Middle East, earning money by singing catchy numbers and playing the guitar. Biddu arrived in England at the age of 23, a few months after leaving India. About his arrival in England, he said in an interview to the BBC: "I didn't really know too much about England or anything – I'd just come here on the chance of meeting the Beatles and doing some music. Everything that I did had this danceable flavour". Within a few months of his arrival, he had met The Beatles, but expressed disappointment that "Lennon was dressed so badly."

In England, he supported himself doing odd jobs and also working as a chef in the American Embassy. His attempts at becoming a singer in England were unsuccessful and, according to Biddu, "as an Indian in those days they were happier to hire me as an accountant than as a singer". He eventually gave up on his ambition to become a singer and instead decided to produce his own records rather than working for a record company. He saved a few pounds before he decided to rent studio time and record several singles, none of which received any airplay from UK radio stations.

Biddu's first major success was in 1969, when he produced the song "Smile for Me", performed by The Tigers, who were Japan's most famous band at the time, and written by Barry and Maurice Gibb of the Bee Gees. Since the band did not speak English, Biddu had to show them how to sing the English lyrics phonetically. Following its release that year, the song topped the chart in Japan. His success abroad in Japan would later pave the way for his later success back in Britain.

== Euro disco scene (1970s & 1980s) ==
During the early 1970s, Biddu produced several early disco songs that, despite receiving no airplay on radio, began gaining some underground success in UK northern soul clubs, in places like Wigan and Blackpool, which were more receptive to Biddu's early disco sounds due to northern soul being a forerunner to disco. The Biddu sound incorporated "solid playing by a hard rhythm section and fast swirling Northern soul–style melodies" and resembled the disco sound that had appeared independently in New York at around the same time.

In 1971, he wrote the title track for the Jack Wild album Everything's Coming Up Roses, which was released as a single backed with "Bring Yourself Back to Me", written by Don Gould and Lynsey De Paul. The single earned positive reviews, with Billboard awarding it Special Merit Spotlight status and it reached number 107 on the Billboard Bubbling Under Chart. In 1972, Biddu scored music for the UK spy thriller Embassy. Around this time, he also started working with UK-based Jamaican-born musician Carl Douglas on a 45 (rpm record) single "I Want to Give You My Everything". While this song was intended for the A side, they cut a song for the B side, "Kung Fu Fighting", in only 10 minutes. Later, at the insistence of A&R at Pye Records, "Kung Fu Fighting" was put on the A-side. Soon after release in 1974, "Kung Fu Fighting" became a worldwide hit, ultimately selling eleven million copies worldwide. In 1974, it received a Gold certification. Shortly after, Biddu also produced Carl Douglas' debut album Kung Fu Fighting and Other Great Love Songs, which produced another major hit, "Dance The Kung Fu". He soon established himself as one of the key figures in Britain's soul and disco scenes during the 1970s, working with a variety of British soul and disco artists, including Tina Charles, The Outriders, and Jimmy James.

In 1975, Biddu recorded and released the instrumental LP, Blue Eyed Soul, and the album's first single, "Summer of '42", climbed to No. 14 on the UK Singles Chart, spending two months there and then had similar success in the US, topping the Dance Music/Club Play Singles chart and reached No. 57 on the Billboard Hot 100. Another single, "Jump for Joy", also topped the Dance Music/Club Play Singles chart in the US while reaching No. 72 on the Billboard Hot 100 in 1976. In the Billboard Year-End chart, "Jump For Joy" was ranked No. 21 on the list. Also in 1975, he produced the album Can You Hear Me Ok? and single "I Got My Lady" for John Howard. Around the same time, a friend introduced Biddu to Tina Charles, a singer who had had some success singing lead vocals for the group 5000 Volts. The first single they worked together, "You Set My Heart on Fire", clinched a recording deal with CBS. In 1976, the second single "I Love to Love (But My Baby Loves to Dance)" was a major hit worldwide. "I Love to Love" and the subsequent hit "Dance Little Lady Dance" sold millions of copies around the world, giving Tina Charles a worldwide audience and fame, launching her solo career and firmly establishing Biddu.

In 1976, Biddu produced his own Rain Forest LP, followed by Eastern Man in 1977, both credited to Biddu & His Orchestra. His album Rain Forest earned him four Ivor Novello Awards, including the "Songwriter of the Year" award. Around this same time, he began experimenting with electronic music in some of his disco songs, making use of electronic musical instruments such as keyboards and synthesizers. Some of his early examples of electronic disco include the early boogie 1976 single "Bionic Boogie"; the 1977 "Soul Coaxing" single; the Eastern Man and Futuristic Journey albums, which were recorded from 1976 to 1977; and the 1979 "Phantasm" single. He also began experimenting with high-tempo Hi-NRG disco music, with early examples including some of the songs in his 1976 Tina Charles albums I Love to Love and Dance Little Lady, as well as his disco singles such as "Voodoo Man" (1979) which had a tempo of 130 beats per minute. His backing tracks also had a strong influence on the British new wave band The Buggles, founded by two of Biddu's former session musicians, Trevor Horn and Geoff Downes, who are most famous for writing the hit song "Video Killed the Radio Star" in 1979.

In 1977, he worked on the Life album for the veteran Jamaican-born soul singer Jimmy James, which put out two chart hits "I'll Go Where Your Music Takes Me" and "Disco Fever". In early 1978, Biddu's own "Journey to the Moon" was a hit, peaking at No. 41 in the UK. That same year, he scored the music for the English film The Stud, starring Joan Collins; the film's soundtrack was successful on the UK Albums Chart, where it reached No. 2. He also produced the soundtrack for its sequel, The Bitch, in 1979. During the late 1970s, Biddu also had a hit in France with Claude François, for whom he produced the song "Laisse Une Chance A Notre Amour", a re-working of Jimmy James' UK hit song, "Now Is the Time".

Biddu worked with various musicians including some players from Manchester and Liverpool who had worked on sessions with Tina Charles until the late 1970s, after which disco music slowly began to wane as funk, new wave and electronic music began taking centre-stage in Western popular music, taking with it Biddu's established place in the Western music scene, despite his early attempts at producing electronic synthpop music, such as his 1980 song "Small Talk" for Amy.

Hot Cuisine aka Hot Quisine were a jazz-funk group from Sheffield who had previously recorded as Celebration. Biddu, Ron Roker and Anne Dudley wrote the song "Dancin' Me to Ecstasy" for Hot Cuisine. Backed with "All Fired Up", it was released on Kaleidoscope Records Limited in January 1981. It was reviewed in the 31 January issue of Record Mirror. James Hamilton noted the ska feel of the record which he called a "140bpm 12in pop galloper" with the "traditional disco trappings". He also wrote that hip deejays would prefer the B side which he referred to as a 122bpm jiggly smacking song which was mellower and more manageable. Both sides of record also debuted at No. 77 in the Record Mirror UK Disco chart that week. The record peaked at No. 53 for the week of 28 February.

Biddu, Winston Sela and Ron Roker wrote the song "Who's Been Kissing You" for Hot Cusine. Biddu produced it. In the US, it peaked at No. 31 on the Billboard Disco Top 80 chart for the week of 3 October.

Biddu produced the single "Skunkin'" bw "Disco Calypso" for Hot Cuisine. The B side was remixed and ended up being issued as an A side in 1981. It peaked at No. 36 on the Record Mirror UK Disco chart for the week of 28 November.

Working again with composers Roker and Dudley, Biddu co-wrote "Ride on a Rhythm" for Hor Cuisine. It was released on Kaleidoscope Records Limited in March 1982. James Hamilton reviewed it in the 20 March issue of Record Mirror. Even though Hamilton wrote that the song was bland, he did say that it thudded along with everything under careful control. He also noted Roy 'Mr Magic' Carter's salvaging remix attempt. It debuted at No. 62 on the Record Mirror Pop Oriented Dance chart for the week of 10 April 1982. It peaked at No. 54 for the week of 8 May.

The song "Applause" that Biddu co-composed with Sela was recorded by Angie Gold and produced by Nigel Wright. Backed with "Creature Of The Night", it was released on Passion PASH 62 in 1986. It peaked at No. 2 on the Record Mirror Eurobeat chart for the week of 4 October 1986.

== Success in Asia (1980s) ==
In the late 1970s, Western disco was getting popular in Asia and particularly in India, where there were not yet any home-bred disco stars. It was this reason that led established Indian filmmaker and actor Feroz Khan to England and to Biddu, in 1979. Khan wanted to introduce a catchy song in his upcoming Hindi film, Qurbani, in which the main score of the film was by the Indian music duo, Kalyanji Anandji. Biddu initially was not interested in composing a Hindi film song, but later took it up as he would say years later, "I thought it would keep my mum happy (back home in India)". About the same time Khan happened to come across 15-year-old Nazia Hassan at a party in London. Khan later requested Hassan have an audition with Biddu. Biddu later signed her up for the song he was composing for Qurbani.

It did not take a long time for Biddu to compose "Aap Jaisa Koi" for Qurbani. The tune and composition he used for "Aap Jaisa Koi" was similar to several of his earlier songs, particularly the 1976 Tina Charles hit "Dance Little Lady Dance". As the girl, Nazia Hassan, had a nasal voice, Biddu decided to backtrack it for an echo effect. The song which was recorded in London, was the first Hindi song to be recorded on 24 tracks. In 1980, Qurbani ran to packed houses in India, largely on the weight of "Aap Jaisa Koi" and another number "Laila O Laila". Nazia Hassan became a teenage sensation. "Aap Jaisa Koi" was a hit across the Indian subcontinent.

Riding on the popularity of the song and the film, Biddu decided to sign Nazia Hassan and her brother Zoheb Hassan up for an Urdu pop album, something hitherto not tried in India. Biddu modeled them on the then-popular American brother-sister duo, The Carpenters. Biddu composed a few catchy numbers for Nazia and Zoheb for the album Disco Deewane. In 1981, the album was a hit across Asia, South Africa, and some countries in South America (particularly Brazil where it topped the chart), charting in 14 countries. The album became the best-selling Asian pop album up until that time. The 15-year-old teenage Pakistani singer Nazia Hassan became a household name across South Asia. Disco Deewane was followed by the production of three more heavy hitters with Nazia and Zoheb; Star/Boom Boom in 1982 (the number "Boom Boom" from the album and film Star was a hit), then the album Young Tarang 1984 two years later, before winding up again with the duo in 1987 with Hotline. The duo went on to sell 60 million records worldwide.

Beyond Southern Asia, he also had some success in another part of Asia, the Far East. After having previously had a chart-topping hit in Japan with The Tigers in 1969, he returned there to work with the popular Japanese idol and J-pop singer Akina Nakamori, for whom he produced "Don't Tell Me This is Love" in 1985. It was included in her 1985 album My Best Thanks, which topped the Japanese chart and sold around 300,000 copies. He produced several more hit songs for Akina Nakamori, including the 1987 songs "The Look That Kills" and "BLONDE", which became chart-topping hits in Japan. "BLONDE" in particular sold over 300,000 copies in Japan that year. He also worked in Hong Kong, where he produced and composed the song "傷心戲院" ("Sad Theater") for C-pop singer Samantha Lam in 1988. In the Philippines, the song "Chic-Chica-Chic-Chica-Chic" from his hit 1976 album Rainforest was used as the main theme of the popular 1980s sitcom Chicks to Chicks. In the late 1980s, he returned to the UK music scene with house music records such as "Humanity" (1989).

== Indian pop scene (1990s) ==
Having spent nearly a decade with the Nazia-Zoheb pair, Biddu next turned his attention to Hindi vocalist Shweta Shetty, both writing and producing the Johnny Joker album in 1993. Then in 1995, came another album, composed and produced by Biddu. Made in India – a dance album for the Hindi pop/film playback singer Alisha Chinai. The album became the best selling Hindi dance album and featured a handful of Western styled videos – a selling point for India's newly launched MTV channel. It topped the Indian chart, where it remained for over a year, and sold over five million copies in India.

In 1996, Biddu made a brother-sister duo popular again with Shaan (Shantanu Mukherjee) and Sagarika Mukherjee (Saag), producing the Naujawan album. Biddu spent the rest of the 1990s working with a variety of musicians, including the Indian girl-group Models, South Indian Singer K.S. Chithra, and Sonu Nigam, as well as continuing his collaboration with Alisha Chinai on her Dil Ki Rani album. Into the new millennium, he produced two hit songs with Sansara, Yeh Dil Sun Raha Hai and Habibi.

His own 1999 album, Eastern Journey, was an experiment which blended Indian pop with Western flair and strong, jazz elements.

Biddu also worked with Junaid Jamshed. Both of them worked in London and produced an album under the composition and lyrics of Shoib Mansoor Sahab.

In 2000 he launched the first ever British Asian Girl band ‘Sansara’. Their songs “Yeh Dil Sun raha hai” written by Sophie Choudry and “Habibi” went on to become big hits. The band split up but he continued to work with pop diva Sophie Choudry and produced her debut solo album “Le Le Mera Dil” in 2002. Til date, she credits him with her success saying he discovered her and encouraged her to move to India to pursue her career.

== Experiments in fusion (2000s) ==
In 2004, Biddu re-emerged with the album Diamond Sutra.

Biddu now lives in Spain with his English wife of 39 years, Sue, and two grown-up children. He started a publishing house called SueBiddu Music, which administers music for artists, wrote an autobiography called Made in India at the insistence of his wife, and has returned to live performances as a singer. In 2010, Biddu won an "Outstanding Achievement" award at the UK Asian Music Awards (UK AMAs), and he was also awarded the "Lifetime Achievement Award" at the JD Rock Awards in India that same year.

== Discography ==
The following is a selected discography of albums, singles and soundtracks he has produced or composed. Biddu has also given music for Junaid Jamshed.

=== Producer and writer ===
==== Albums ====
- Jack Wild – A Beautiful World (1972)
- Carl Douglas – Kung Fu Fighting and Other Great Love Songs (1974)
- Jimmy James – You Don't Stand a Chance if You Can't Dance (1975)
- John Howard – Can You Hear Me OK? (1975, unreleased; 2005)
- Lee Vanderbilt -– Get into What You're In (1977)
- Tina Charles – I Love to Love (1976)
- Jimmy James – Life (1977)
- Tina Charles – Rendezvous (1977)
- Tina Charles – Greatest Hits (1978)
- Kelly Marie – Feels Like I'm in Love (1981)
- Nazia Hassan – Disco Deewane (1981)
- Nazia Hassan & Zoheb Hassan – Star/Boom Boom (1982)
- Nazia Hassan & Zoheb Hassan – Young Tarang (1984)
- Nazia Hassan & Zoheb Hassan – Hotline (1987)
- Alisha Chinai – Made in India (1995)
- Junaid Jamshed -Naam (1995)
- The Pearls – A String of Pearls (2005)
- Debojit Saha - Debojit (2006)
- Sophie Choudry – Le Mera Dil (2008)

==== Singles ====
- The Tigers – "Smile for Me" (1969)
- The Showstoppers – "Action Speaks Louder Than Words" (1971)
- Jack Wild – "(Holy Moses!) Everything's Coming Up Roses" (1971)
- Carl Douglas – "Ain't No Use" (1972)
- Jimmy James – "A Man Like Me" (1972)
- The Flirtations – "Love A Little Longer" (1972)
- Mac and Katie Kissoon – "Beautiful World Out There" (1973)
- The Black Knights – "Billy Gunn" (1973)
- The Playthings – "Stop What You're Doing" (1973)
- Carl Douglas – "Kung Fu Fighting" (1974)
- The Pearls – "Doctor Love" (1974)
- The Playthings – "Surrounded by a Ray of Sunshine" (1974)
- Tina Charles – "One Broken Heart For Sale" (1974)
- Carl Douglas – "Blue Eyed Soul" (1975)
- Jimmy James – "You Don't Stand a Chance (If You Can't Dance)" (1975)
- John Howard – "I Got My Lady" (1975)
- Tina Charles – "You Set My Heart on Fire" (1975)
- Biddu – "Groovy Kind of Love" (1976)
- Jimmy James – "Now Is the Time" (1976)
- Tina Charles – "Dance Little Lady Dance" (1976)
- Tina Charles – "I Love to Love (But My Baby Loves to Dance)" (1976)
- Tina Charles – "Love Me Like A Lover" (1976)
- Claude François – "Laisse Une Chance A Notre Amour" (1977)
- The Real Thing – "Let's Go Disco" (1978)
- Captain Zorro – "Phantasm" (1979)
- Amy – "Small Talk" (1980)
- Hot Cuisine - "Dancin' Me to Ecstasy" (1980)
- Hot Cuisine - "Who's Been Kissing You" (1981)
- Hot Cuisine - Disco Calypso (1981)
- Akina Nakamori – "Don't Tell Me This is Love" (1985)
- Agnes Chiang (蔣麗萍) – "No. 55" (1985)
- Akina Nakamori – "The Look That Kills" (1987)
- Akina Nakamori – "Blonde" (1987)
- Samantha Lam – "傷心戲院" ("Sad Theater") (1988)
- Caron – "You'll Always Have A Friend" (1992)
- Nazia Hassan – "Boom Boom: The Biddu Experience '95" (1995)
- Bus Stop – "Kung Fu Fighting" (1998)
- Brighouse and Rastrick Brass Band – "I'll Go Where Your Music Takes Me" (1999)

=== Biddu Orchestra ===
==== Albums ====
- Blue Eyed Soul (1975)
- Rain Forest (1976)
- Funky Tropical (1977)
- Journey to the Moon (1977)
- Soul Coaxing / Nirvana (1977)
- Journey to the Moon / Journey in the Rain (1977)
- Eastern Man (1977)
- The Best of Biddu (1978)
- Disco Gold (1978)
- Futuristic Journey (1978)
- Dance of Shiva (1985)
- Diamond Sutra (2004)

==== Singles ====
- "Theme from Summer of '42" (1975)

Released on the Epic label (EPC3318) Composer: M. Legrand Produced by Biddu for Subiddu Music and Productions Ltd. "B" side: "Northern Dancer" Composer: Biddu-Gerry Shury-McDonald-Rae

- "Jump for Joy" (1975)
- "Rain Forest" (1976)

Released on the Epic label (EPC4084) Composer: Biddu Produced by Biddu for Subiddu Music Ltd. "B" side: "Exodus" Composer: E. Gold

- "Bionic Boogie" (1976)
- "Soul Coaxing" (1977)
- "Voodoo Man" (1979)

=== Movie soundtracks ===
- Embassy (1972)
- The 14 (1973)
- The Stud (1978)
- The Bitch (1979)
- Flat Bust (1979)
- Qurbani (soundtrack released 1979, film released 1980)
- Star (1982)
- Goonj (1989)
- Maut Ki Sazaa (1991)
- Shootout at Lokhandwala (2007)
- Rise of the Zombie (2013)
