= Disco Deewane =

Studio album by Nazia Hassan
- Released: April 3, 1981
- Studio: His Master's Voice Calcutta
- Genres: Pakistani pop; disco
- Label: His Master's Voice
- Producer: Biddu

Nazia Hassan chronology
| Disco Deewane (1981) | Star/Boom Boom (1982) |

Disco Deewane (Urdu: ڈسکو دیوانے) is a 1981 Pakistani pop album released by the Pakistani singing duo Nazia and Zoheb, consisting of Nazia Hassan and Zoheb Hassan. The music was composed by Indian-British music director Biddu, and Zoheb Hassan, who also produced it under the label of His Master's Voice and Nazia and Zoheb’s family company, B&H International Pvt Limited.

The lyrics of Disco Deewane were penned by Zoheb Hassan, Nazia Hassan and Anwar Khalid. Other writers were also commissioned by the co-financier/producer of the album, Basir Hassan under his company B&H International Pvt Limited.

The album charted in fourteen countries worldwide and became the best-selling Asian pop record to date. The debut album led Nazia Hasan to overnight fame. It changed trends in music across South Asia, where it broke sales records. In India, it sold 100,000 records within a day of its release in Mumbai alone, went Platinum within three weeks, and went double-Platinum soon after.

In South Asia, where the music industry was previously dominated by filmi Bollywood soundtracks, Disco Deewaane was the first non-soundtrack album to become a major success across the region, paving the way for the emergence of independent Pakistani and Indian pop music scenes. It was also the first South Asian pop album to top the charts in Brazil, while also becoming a hit in Russia, South Africa, Philippines, Malaysia, Indonesia and Latin America, and a success among the South Asian diaspora in regions such as Canada, the United Kingdom, United States, and West Indies.

This song also appeared on the soundtrack of the series Ms. Marvel, in the episode "Seeing Red", and was remixed in the Bollywood movie Student of the Year as "The Disco Song".

== Track listing ==
Back cover of album "Disco Deewane"

| No. | Title | Lyrics | Music | Singer(s) | Length |
|---|---|---|---|---|---|
| 1. | "Aao Na" | Nazia and Zoheb | Biddu | Nazia Hassan | 4:07 |
| 2. | "Disco Deewane" (I) | Anwar Khalid | Biddu | Nazia | 4:00 |
| 3. | "Leykin Mera Dil" | Nazia and Zoheb | Biddu | Nazia | 4:02 |
| 4. | "Mujhe Chahay" | Nazia and Zoheb | Zoheb Hassan | Nazia and Zoheb | 3:43 |
| 5. | "Komal" | Arshad Mehmood | Zoheb Hassan | Nazia | 3:43 |
| 6. | "Teray Qadmon Ko" | Nigar Sebhai | Zoheb Hassan | Nazia and Zoheb | 3:30 |
| 7. | "Dil Mera" | Nazia and Zoheb | Zoheb Hassan | Nazia | 4:24 |
| 8. | "Dhundli Raat" | Meeraji | Zoheb Hassan | Nazia |
| 9. | "Gaein Milkar" | Anwar Khalid | Biddu | Nazia | Anwar Khalid |
| 10. | "Disco Deewane" (II) | | Biddu | Nazia | 4:03 |

== Credits ==
=== Music directors ===
Most of the songs were composed by Biddu

- Biddu
- Arshad Mehmood
- Zoheb Hassan

=== Lyricists ===
- Nazia & Zoheb Hassan
- Anwar Khalid
- Meeraji
- Farooq Qaiser
- Nigar Sebhai

== Cover versions ==
=== Dreamer Devané ===
Nazia Hassan performed a remixed cover version of title track "Disco Deewane" in the English language, called "Dreamer Devané" (1983), which was released as a single. It became the first single by a Pakistani Female singer to enter the UK singles chart.

=== Paara Ushar ===
In 1997, the title song "Disco Deewane" was reused in the Tamil song "Paara Ushar" sung by K.S. Chithra.

=== The Disco Song ===
In 2012, a revamped cover version of the title song "Disco Deewane" was incorporated into the Indian Bollywood film Student of the Year. Titled "The Disco Song", it incorporates Nazia Hassan's vocals, along with the vocals of Sunidhi Chauhan and Benny Dayal, while the music video features Bollywood actors, such as Alia Bhatt, Sidharth Malhotra, Varun Dhawan and Kajol.

Director Karan Johar used the song in his 2012 film after licensing the song from Saregama (successor to His Master's Voice). It has been contested by Nazia Hassan's family, as they claim that Saregama doesn't own the album because it was financed by them in London.

== Certifications and sales ==
Certifications and sales for "Disco Deewane"
| Region | Certification | Certified units/sales |
|---|---|---|
| India (EMI) | 2× Platinum | 1,000,000 |
| Pakistan (EMI Pakistan) | Platinum | 250,000 |
Summaries
| Worldwide | — | 14,000,000 |
