= Nazia Hassan =

Pakistani singer (1965–2000)

Nazia Hassan PoP
- نازیہ حسن
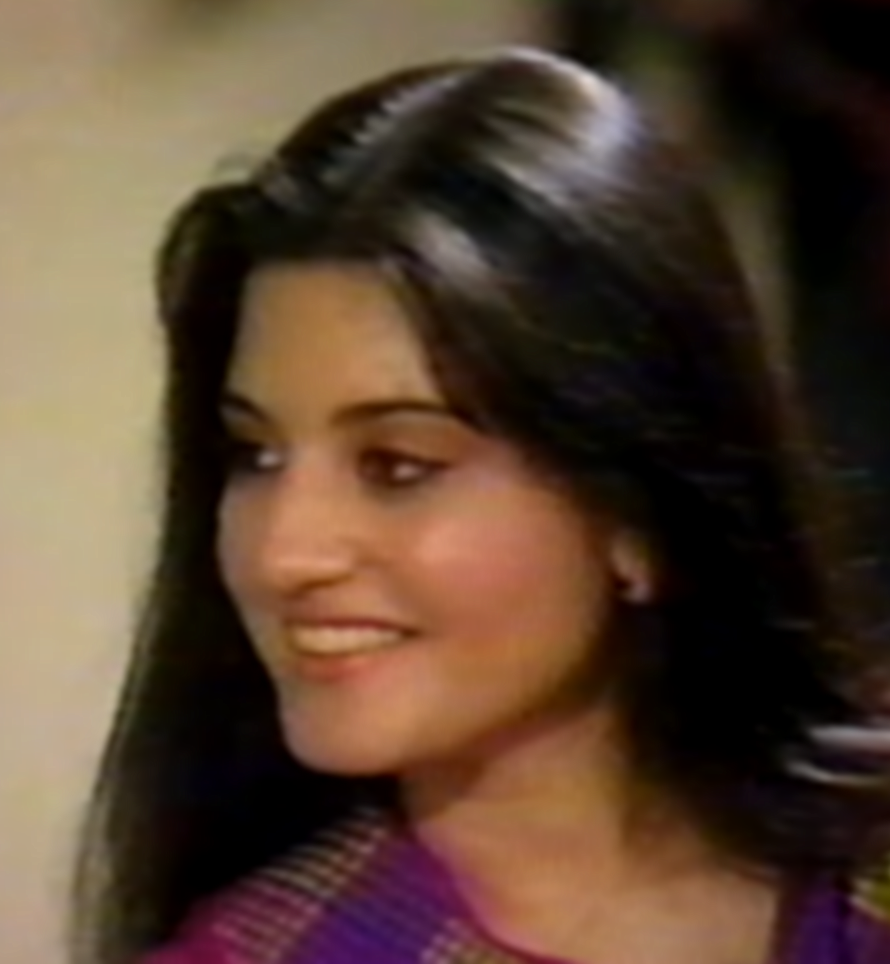
- Hassan c. 1990s
- Born: 3 April 1965; Karachi, Sindh, Pakistan
- Died: 13 August 2000 (aged 35); London, England
- Citizenship: Pakistani
- Education: Richmond University; University of London
- Occupations: Singer; songwriter; philanthropist; political analyst; lawyer
- Years active: 1980–2000
- Spouse: Mirza Ishtiaq Baig (m. 1995; div. 2000)
- Children: 1
- Relatives: Zoheb Hassan (brother)
- Awards: Pride of Performance (2002)
- Musical career
- Genres: Filmi; Disco; Pop
- Instrument: Vocals

Nazia Hassan (3 April 1965 – 13 August 2000) was a Pakistani singer, songwriter, and philanthropist. Regarded as the "Queen of South Asian Pop,” she is considered one of the most influential musical figures in Pakistani history who completely overturned the music industry in the late 70s and 80s. She is the subcontinent's early pop star after Ahmed Rushdi. Starting in the 1980s, as part of the duo Nazia and Zoheb, she and her brother Zoheb Hassan, have sold over 65 million records worldwide.

Hassan made her singing debut with the song "Aap Jaisa Koi", which appeared in the Indian film Qurbani in 1980. She received praise for the single, and won the Filmfare Award for Best Female Playback Singer at the age of 15 in 1981, becoming the first Pakistani to win and currently remains the youngest recipient of the award to date. Her debut album, Disco Deewane, was released in 1981, and charted in fourteen countries worldwide and became the best-selling Asian pop record up at the time. The album included the English-language single "Disco Deewane" which led her to be the first Pakistani singer to make it to the British charts.

Hassan followed up with the albums Boom Boom in 1982, part of which was used as the soundtrack of the film Star (1982), Young Tarang in 1984, and Hotline in 1987. The track "Dum Dum Dede" from Young Tarang was used in closing scene of the 2012 Indian film, Miss Lovely by Ashim Ahluwalia. Her last album, Camera Camera in 1992, was part of a campaign against drugs. Along with her brother, she also appeared in several television programs. In 1988 she appeared in Sung Sung with music maestro Sohail Rana. They also hosted the first-ever pop-music stage show, Music '89, produced by Shoaib Mansoor. Her success played a key role in shaping Pakistani pop music scene.

Throughout her singing career spanning over 15 years, Hassan became one of South Asia's most popular celebrities. She was a recipient of Pakistan's civilian award, the Pride of Performance, which was announced posthumously in 2002. In addition to singing, she also engaged in philanthropic activities, and was appointed by UNICEF as its cultural ambassador in 1991.

From 1995 to 2000, Hassan was married to businessman Ishtiaq Baig, with whom she had a son. She died on 13 August 2000 at the age of 35, due to lung cancer in London.

== Early life ==
Hassan was born in Karachi, Pakistan on 3 April 1965, and brought up in Karachi and London. She was the daughter of Basir Hassan, a businessman, and Muniza Basir, an active social worker. She was the sister of singers Zoheb Hassan and Zara Hassan.

== Career ==
Hassan's professional music career started at the age of fifteen - and she was first discovered by Indian actress Zeenat Aman, who she had come to meet as a fan, accompanied by her mother and brother. Through Zeenat Aman, she met film director Feroz Khan at a party in the United Kingdom, who later requested that she audition with Biddu, a London-based Indian music composer, for his film Qurbani. Biddu then signed her up for "Aap Jaisa Koi", a song he composed for the film. The song turned to be a huge success in India, and Hassan quickly gained recognition and acclaim.

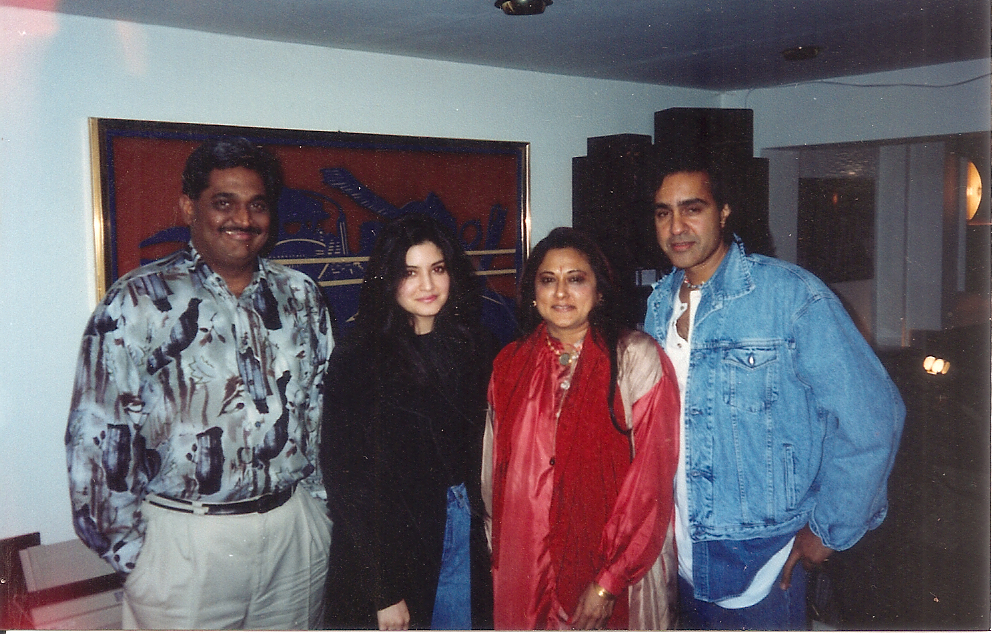
Nazia with Biddu and others in Mumbai, 1994

Hassan promptly collaborated with Biddu on numerous other projects; in 1981, she became the first playback singer to release an album. Her first album was Disco Deewane. The album broke sales records in Pakistan and India and even topped the charts in the West Indies, Latin America and Russia, becoming an international success. The album became a mega-hit and Hassan became an established pop singer in Pakistan; the album also featured vocals by her brother Zohaib Hassan. Nazia and Zoheb were signed by EMI Group and were the first South Asian singers to be signed by an international music company. At the height of Disco Deewane fever, she frequently drew large crowds, such as 50,000 to 100,000 people greeting her at Calcutta Airport.

After the release of Disco Deewane, Biddu offered Zoheb and her a chance to act in the movie Star in 1982, but they refused and instead chose to perform the soundtrack. The soundtrack album, Star/Boom Boom, was released. She was nominated for the Filmfare Award for Best Female Playback Singer, although this time she did not win. The album was successful and increased the popularity of Hassan and Zohaib in Pakistan and India.

Hassan's third album, Young Tarang, was released in 1984. It was the first album in Pakistan to feature music videos, which were made in London by David Rose and Kathy Rose. The album became one of the most popular in Asia. "Ankhien Milane Wale" was a popular song from the album. After the release of Young Tarang, she returned to singing for Bollywood movies as a playback singer. Her fourth album, Hotline was released in 1987. Aa Haan was the most popular song of the album. In 1988, she and her brother Zohaib appeared with music maestro Sohail Rana in his television program, Sung Sung.

In 1989, she and Zohaib hosted the show Music '89. The show was produced by Shoaib Mansoor. It was the first-ever all pop-music stage show to be aired on television. The show launched the careers of many new rising bands and singers and became popular in Pakistan. She hosted another show, Dhanak on PTV in the same year.

In 1991, Hassan and her brother Zohaib recorded her fifth album, Camera Camera. Before the album's release, she and Zohaib announced that it would be their last album. The album was released in 1992. After the album's release, she left her singing career to focus on her personal life. Biddu composed a song, "Made in India" and he wanted Nazia to sing it. But the retired Hassan refused to sing a song that might offend Pakistan. The song was then offered to Alisha Chinai.

== Personal life ==
Hassan received her Bachelor's degree in Business Administration and Economics from the Richmond American University in London. In 1991, she became an intern in the Women's International Leadership program at the United Nations. Later, she went on to work for the United Nations Security Council. She held a London University Law (LLB) degree.

Nazia Hassan married Karachi-based businessman Mirza Ishtiaq Baig on 30 March 1995. It was an arranged marriage. Hassan's marriage was full of problems and difficulties, and she divorced Baig 3 months before her death. She accused her ex-husband of physical abuse and for poisoning her in a testimony given to the UK High Court before her death. Baig claims that Nazia Hassan was his wife until death.

On 21 June 2000, Pakistan's newspaper Daily Jang published an interview with Nazia Hassan. In the interview Hassan opened up for the first time about difficulties she faced during her marriage. She accused her husband of cheating on her with a Pakistani actress. She revealed how her ex-husband forced her to give statements to the media that they were living happily. In a similar interview Hassan stated that her husband refused to bear the expenses of her cancer treatment and that she was looked after by her parents. Hassan said that she would rather die than live with Ishtiaq Baig as he caused her more pain than her cancer.

The marriage to Nazia was Ishtiaq Baig's third. He has a son Imran Baig (born in 1984) with his first wife Hazel who was a Filipina dancer. Ishtiaq Baig was also briefly married to Pakistani actress Shazia. These two marriages were kept secret from Nazia Hassan's family.

Ishtiaq and Nazia Hassan had a son, Arez Hassan, born on 7 April 1997.

In an interview later, her brother Zoheb Hassan related that Nazia's personal life was filled with turmoil and she fought personal battles incessantly.

== Philanthropy ==
Hassan used her abilities to promote social causes. She worked for children, youth and women in distress residing in the underprivileged areas of Karachi. She supported the Inner Wheel Club of India and helped raise funds for it. In Pakistan, together with her brother, Zoheb, and British social entrepreneur, Sophia Swire, she established the organization BAN (Battle Against Narcotics) and became an active member of organizations such as Voice of Women, National Youth Organisation (Pakistan). She is credited for her part in the introduction of mobile clinics in Lyari Town, to make medicine more accessible to the deprived people.

Hassan worked with Javed Jabbar, former Information minister, to raise funds for children in Tharparkar and Rajasthan. She went to a large number of schools to hand out toys to poor children and gave talks on the subject of social awareness for the under-privileged.

In 1991, she joined the United Nations Security Council at the United Nations Headquarters in New York City and worked there for two years. In her third year, she offered her services at UNICEF. Her social and academic excellence won her a scholarship in Columbia University’s Leadership Program, but she was unable to take up the offer because around this time she was diagnosed with cancer.

In 2003, Hassan’s parents created the Nazia Hassan Foundation to further their daughter’s efforts to make the world a better place for everyone, regardless of caste, creed and religion; they decided to open school for street children would help in the grooming and education of working street children.

== Death ==
Nazia Hassan died of lung cancer in London on 13 August 2000 at the age of 35. She had been admitted to the North London Hospice three days earlier when her condition deteriorated. She showed signs of mild recovery the day before she died and it was thought that the doctors would allow her to go home.

The next day, her mother Muniza was called to the hospital where her daughter had started coughing heavily at around 9:15 am. She died within minutes of having a pulmonary embolism. Following a funeral prayer at Hendon Mosque, Nazia was buried in the Muslim section of Hendon Cemetery, London on 5 September 2000 as per Islamic rites. In an interview with The Express Tribune newspaper, her brother Zoheb revealed "She died an unhappy person, she died in pain".

Zoheb Hassan said later that she kept the family in the dark about her marriage problems until she was finally divorced days before her death.

== Impact and achievements ==
=== Influence and legacy ===
Pakistan's vibrant contemporary pop music scene owes itself to Nazia Hassan's redefinition of pop; for her contributions to the genre, she has since been referred to as the "Queen of Pop" in South Asia. She is also known as the "Sweetheart of Pakistan". She is frequently compared to Princess Diana, as she was known to possess a "heart of gold". India Today magazine voted her as one of the top 50 influential people. "She set – well ahead of its time – the personal album trend in India, spawning the likes of Alisha Chinai, Lucky Ali and Shweta Shetty", the magazine noted at the time.

On 9 March 2002, Nazia Hassan Tribute Concert was held in Karachi, the classic line-up of Vital Signs and Jupiters performed together on stage – for the first time in almost 7 years. The concert was attended by an enthusiastic audience. In 2007, Ahmad Haseeb created the documentary A Music Fairy in a tribute to Hassan which was screened at Kara Film Festival and University of Ankara. In 2009, Director Faraz Waqar paid a tribute to Nazia for her work in music and making Pakistan proud.

On 31 October 2014, Global Voices Online named her as "Young, Independent women who made a space for themselves in Pakistan Music Industry". On 9 November 2014, the Delhi Pop line, showed at the TDAP's Aalishan Pakistan fashion show in Delhi paid ode to Nazia Hassan. On 16 November 2014, Coke Studio Pakistan paid a tribute to Nazia Hassan in season seven with the song "Jaana" sung by Zoheb Hassan and Zoe Viccaji. The song was well received by critics and audiences alike. The song was high on the music charts and is popular on music channels and radio stations. On 17 November 2014, Hassan was named as one of ARY News's "one of the 11 female pioneers of Pakistan." Also in 2014, the posthumous honorary degree of doctorate from Richmond American University, London, was received by her son Arez Hassan in her honor.

An India Today article titled "Nazia makes a lovely comeback" celebrated Nazia Hassan's music appearing in the cult 2012 film, Miss Lovely that had premiered at the Cannes Film Festival: "The film has made the audience nostalgic over Ahluwalia's use of the song "Dum dum de de" from Hassan's 1984 album, Young Tarang." Miss Lovely director, Ashim Ahluwalia, described keeping the original track untouched: "The song symbolises the '80s and the lyrics of the song were in sync with the mood of the film. [We] retained the original voice of Nazia. We didn't want to remix this song because the original was perfect."

In 2018, Google honoured her with a doodle on what would have been her 53rd birthday that "imagines her performing with her famous flowing hair and dupatta, and the disco balls of the 80s glinting behind her." It was shown to Google users in Australia, Canada, Iceland, New Zealand and Pakistan. In 2020, actress Meesha Shafi covered Hassan's single "Boom Boom" in her memory, which was praised by Zoheb.

On 19 August 2022, she was honoured in New York and was shown at Times Square billboards on her 22nd death anniversary, courtesy of Spotify and remembered as one of the most influential singers of all time.

=== Awards and honours ===
Hassan received a Filmfare Award in 1980 for Best Female Playback Singer. as well as another nomination for the same award in 1983.

- In 1988, Nazia was awarded Nigar Award for Best Compere.
- In 1989, she was awarded PTV Silver Jubilee Award at 9th PTV Awards for her contributions to the Music Industry.
- Pride of Performance Award by the President of Pakistan in 2002 (award was accepted by her mother Muneeza Basir for late Nazia Hassan). The award was presented to Muniza Basir, Hassan's mother, from the President of Pakistan Pervez Musharraf in an official ceremony held at Islamabad in 2002.
- Golden Disc Award (South Korean Music Award)
- On 24 November 2022, she was awarded the Lux Changemaker Award at 21st Lux Style Awards; the award was given to her family.

== Discography ==
=== Studio albums ===
- Disco Deewane (1981) (charted in 14 countries became the best-selling Asian pop record at the time)
- Boom Boom (1982)
- Young Tarang (1984) (This was the first album to feature music videos in Pakistan)
- Hotline (1987)
- Camera Camera (1992)

=== Extended plays ===
- Our Love Last Forever (1981)
- Get a Little Closer (1982)
- Dreamer Devane (1983)
- Dil Ki Lagi
- Then He Kissed Me (1988)

=== Film soundtracks ===
- Qurbani (1980) (Aap Jaisa Koi, her first popular song from this film)
- Star (1982)
- Dilwaala (1986)
- Ilzaam (1986)
- Main Balwaan (1986)
- Adhikar (1986)
- Sheela (1987)
- Saaya (1989)
- Student of the Year (2012)
- Miss Lovely (2012)

== See also ==
- Strings
- Nazia and Zoheb
