= Zoheb Hassan =

Pakistani singer (born 1966)

Zoheb Hassan زوہیب حسن
- Born: Syed Zoheb-u-Din Hassan; November 18, 1966 (age 59)
- Origin: Karachi, Sindh, Pakistan
- Occupations: CEO of B&H, advisor to Governor of Sindh; singer; music & film producer
- Instruments: Vocals; guitar and piano
- Years active: 1981–1992; 2006–2007, 2014–2015
- Label: EMI Pakistan

Zoheb Hassan (born November 18, 1966) is a Pakistani pop icon, singer, songwriter, producer, and was a part of the superduo Nazia and Zoheb, with his sister Nazia Hassan.

== Early career and breakthrough ==
Zoheb and his sister Nazia spent their childhood in Karachi as well as London.

After the release of their first album, Disco Deewane, Nazia and Zoheb became the South-Asian sub-continent's first pop icons. Several successful albums established the duo's status as pioneers of pop music in the region. They sold over 300 million records worldwide and topped the charts in several countries, including South Africa, Guatemala, Colombia, and Venezuela.

Zoheb is a singer, songwriter and producer. He has received 12 gold, 4 platinum and 2 double platinum discs in his music career. He is also the recipient of a Lifetime Achievement Award from the United Nations Association of Pakistan and an award from Oxford University for Achievements in the field of South Asian Music. He took some time off from music after Nazia's demise to concentrate on his extensive family business in Pakistan and the UK.

His latest album, SIGNATURE, was released in 2017, in collaboration with EMI Pakistan and Sa Re Ga Ma (in India). In an interview with The Express Tribune, Zoheb reminisces, "Signature actually contains the last track that Nazia Hassan sung. Unfortunately she fell ill and plans for an album were put on hold." He also revealed that Nazia had sung alternate versions of "Koi Nahi", "Disco Deewane" and "Boom Boom" - all three of which have been put into one song in Signature. "The album revolves around my experiences and all that I and my family have experienced over the last 10 years or so," he added. He plans a documentary and released the album's first music video, "Always On My Mind", the track bringing to mind, the original "Always on My Mind". The title is in English, but the lyrics are in Urdu. The music video features Zoheb himself, and portrays a celebrity's life, who loses out on his family life after his climb to success.

== Discography ==
=== Albums ===
- Our Love Last Forever (1981)
- Get a little Closer (1982)
- Dreamer Deewane (1983)
- Young Tarang (1984)
- Hotline (1987)
- Don't Think Twice (1989)
- Camera Camera (1992)
- Kismet (2006)
- Signature (2017)

=== Films ===
- Star/Boom Boom (1982)
- Dil Wala (1986)
- Ilzaam (1986)
- Sheela (1987)
- Saaya (1989)
- Miss Lovely (2012)
- Ho Mann Jahaan (2015)

=== Solos ===
- Ankhien Band Karo (1995)
- Star of Asia (2002)
- Medlay (2002)
- Sathi Ray (2003)
- Khubsoorat (2003)

=== TV appearances ===
- Disco Deewane (BBC Show 1981)
- Disco Deewane (DD 1 1981)
- BBC News (1981)
- Zia Moh-u-Din Show (Channel 4 1981)
- David Sole (1981)
- David Essex (1981)
- Neelam Ghar (1983–1988)
- Young Tarang Show (DD 1 1984)
- Aap Ke Liye (PTV 1985)
- Youth Festival (1985)
- PTV Election Transmission (1985)
- TV Hits (1987)
- BBC Show (1987)
- 7Th PTV Awards (1987)
- PTV Awards (1988)
- Don't Think Twice (1988)
- Aap Ka Zamir (1987)
- Music 89 (1989)
- Nazia Zoheb Dubai show 89 (1989)
- PTV Silver Jublie Show (1989)
- Private Eye
- Aap Ke Mehman (1990)
- PTV 25 (1990)
- Mehman-i-Khasosi (1990)
- Studio 2 (1990)
- Eid Show (1992)
- Kaliyan (1990–1991)
- Pro Audio Show (1995)
- PTV World (1998)
- PTV Top Ten (1999)
- Zee TV (2000)
- Tribute Concert to Nazia Hassan (2002)
- PTV Prime (2000)
- PTV Nite Time Transmission (2002)
- PTV Awards (2002)
- Face of The Year (2002)
- Black & White (Indus Vision 2002)
- PTV Ramdan Transmission (2003)
- Face of The Year (2003)
- Gaye Ge Dunia Geet Mere (Geo TV, 2003)
- Kismet Show (Geo TV, 2006)
- Hum Morning Show (Hum TV, 2007)
- PTV ED Live Transmission (August 13, 2007)
- Marina Morning (ARY Digital, October 31, 2007)
- Baat Nikley Gee Tu (ARY Digital, December 26, 2007)
- Tribute to Nazia Hassan (Play TV, 2008)
- Nazia Hassan Ke Salgirah (MTV, 2008)
- Subah Sawaire with Shaista (ARY OneWorld, 2008)
- Sunday with Bushra (Geo Entertainment, April 27, 2008)

=== TV dramas ===
- Kismet (Geo TV, 2006)

== Personal life ==
Zoheb is a father of three children - two daughters and a son.

== See also ==
- Nazia and Zoheb
