= Fifty-Fifty =

Fifty-Fifty may refer to:

== Arts and entertainment ==
=== Theatre ===
- Fifty-Fifty (play), a 1932 play by H. F. Maltby

=== Film ===
- Fifty-Fifty (1916 film), an American silent drama directed by Allan Dwan
- Fifty-Fifty (1925 film), an American silent drama directed by Henri Diamant-Berger
- Fifty-Fifty (1971 film), an Israeli comedy directed by Boaz Davidson
- Fifty-Fifty (1972 film), a Soviet spy drama directed by Aleksandr Faintsimmer
- Fiffty Fiffty, a 1981 Indian drama, directed by Shomu Mukherjee
- 50/50 (1982 film), a Norwegian film directed by Oddvar Bull Tuhus
- Fifty/Fifty (1992 film), an American thriller; directed by and co-starring Charles Martin Smith
- Fifty-Fifty (2004 film), a Russian-language Kazakh drama, directed by Gulshat Omarova
- 50/50 (2011 film), an American comedy-drama written by Will Reiser; directed by Jonathan Levine
- 50/50 (2016 film), a documentary on "the 10,000 year history of women and power"
- 50/50 (2019 film), an Indian film

=== Television ===
- 50/50 (South African TV program), a South African environmental television program that has aired since 1987
- 50/50 (British game show), a British children's game show programme that aired from April 1997 to July 2005 on BBC One
- 50–50 (game show), an international game show that is a spin-off of the game show Who Wants to Be a Millionaire?
- 50-50 (series), the English name for the Greek television series Peninta Peninta
- Fifty Fifty (Pakistani TV series), a 1980s Pakistani television comedy series loosely based on the United States' Saturday Night Live TV series
- Fifty-Fifty (Greek TV series), also known as Peninta Peninta, a 2005 Greek comedy television series that was revived in 2011
- "Fifty–Fifty" (The 4400), a 2006 episode
- "Fifty-Fifty" (The IT Crowd), a 2006 episode
- Partners in Crime (U.S. TV series), renamed in the UK as Fifty/Fifty
- 50:50, a "lifeline" in the Who Wants to Be a Millionaire? franchise

=== Music ===
- "Fifty-Fifty" (song), a 1997 Hindi song by Indian pop singers Shaan and Sagarika
- "Fifty-Fifty" (rock song), a 1973 rock song by Frank Zappa, on the album Over-Nite Sensation
- "50/50" (song), a 1987 song by Miho Nakayama
- "50/50", a 2016 song by Dallas Smith, on the album Side Effects
- "50/50 Luv", a 1995 single by American rappers B.G. Knocc Out & Dresta
- "50/50 & Lullaby", a 2003 single by R&B singer Lemar
- 50% & 50%, a 1993 single by Japanese musician hide
- 50/50 (Dima Bilan album) (2011), renamed Mechtatel before its release
- 50 for 50, a 2017 Jethro Tull boxed set
- 50:50@50, a 2017 album by British folk rock band Fairport Convention
- Fifty Fifty (group), a South Korean girl group

== Food and drink ==
- 50/50 burger, a burger made of half ground bacon, half ground beef
- 50/50 martini, a martini with equal amounts of gin and vermouth
- 50/50 (soft drink), a grapefruit-and-lime-flavored beverage
- FiftyFifty Brewing Company, a brewpub

== Other uses ==
- 5050 (number)
- Fifty-fifty, an association football term for a type of challenge
- 50/50 raffle, a type of cash drawing
- 50/50 valve seat, a type of ball valve
- 50–50, rocket propellant community jargon for Aerozine 50

== See also ==
- 50-50 club (disambiguation)
- 5050 (disambiguation)
- 50 (disambiguation)
