= List of songs recorded by Sagarika =

Sagarika is an Indian singer and actress. She sings in Hindi, Assamese and Bengali.

== Hindi film songs ==
Year	Film	Song	Music Director(s)	Writer(s)	Co-singer(s)
1979	Shaayad	"Khushboo Hoon Main"	Manas Mukherjee	Unknown	Mohammed Rafi
1989	Parinda	"Kitni Hai Pyari Pyari" (Sad)	R.D. Burman		Shaan, Sadhana Sargam
2000	Tarkieb	"Dil Mera Tarse"	Aadesh Shrivastava	Unknown	Shaan
2000	Nidaan	"Waqt Ki Keemat"	Rahul Ranande	Gautam Joglekar	Nandu Bhenade
2000	Nidaan	"Aaja Re Chanda" (Female)	Rahul Ranande	Gautam Joglekar	Solo
2002	Danger	"Na Koi Rah Hai"	Prasad Sashte	Shailendra Kumar	Nisha, Caralisa Monteiro
2002	Danger	"Main Hoon Danger"	Prasad Sashte	Shailendra Kumar	Whosane
2002	Danger	"Danger Ek Kharatnak Khel"	Prasad Sashte	Shailendra Kumar	Whosane
2004	Ishq Hai Tumse	"Humko Chahiye"	Himesh Reshammiya	Sameer	Shaan
2005	Page 3	"Yahaan Zindagi"	Samir Tandon	Sandeep Nath	Shaan, Shabab Samir

== Hindi non-film songs ==
Year	Album	Song	Composer(s)	Writer(s)	Co-singer(s)	Notes
1994	Bombay Girl	"Dam Maro Dam"	Alisha Chinai, Lesle Lewis	Anand Bakshi	Nalini Dave	Bonus Track
1995	Oorja	"Q-Funk"	Phill and Jerry	Shweta Shetty, Stylebhai, Shaan, Babul Supriyo, Alisha Chinai, Shweta Mohan	Solo	
1995	Oorja	Swing B	Phill and Jerry	Shweta Shetty, Pradeep Roy	Solo	
1995	Oorja	Memory Lane	Phill and Jerry	Sujatha Mohan	Solo	
1995	Roop Inka Mastana	Roop Tera Mastana	Unknown	Unknown	Shaan, Stylebhai	
1995	Roop Inka Mastana	Pholoon Ka Taroon Ka	Unknown	Unknown	Solo	
1995	Roop Inka Mastana	Naina Barse	Unknown	Unknown	Solo	
1996	Naujawan	Aisa Hota Hai	Biddu	Raajesh Johri	Shaan	Reused in Tamil Song called "Paarthal Kanngal".
1996	Naujawan	Disco Deewane	Biddu	Anwar Khalid	Solo	Remastered Version which was originally sung by Pakistani Singer Nazia Hasan. Also Reused in Tamil Song called "Paara Ushar".
1996	Naujawan	Naujawan	Biddu	Raajesh Johri	Shaan	
1996	Naujawan	Jhoomi Jani	Biddu	Raajesh Johri	Solo	
1996	Naujawan	Jaane Kahan Hai	Biddu	Raajesh Johri	Solo	
1997	Love-Ology	"Love-Ology"	Ram Sampath	Unknown	Solo	
1997	Love-Ology	"Just baby with Just Good Friend"	Ram Sampath	Unknown	Shaan, Hema Sardesai	
1997	A Reason To Smile	Fifty Fifty	Raju Singh	Arun Raj	Shaan	
1998	Maa	"Dhup Mein Chaya Jaise"	Salim–Sulaiman	Unknown	Solo	First Solo Album Released
2000	Sparsh	"Naam Apna Likh Gaya Hai"	Zubeen Garg	Zubeen Garg	Zubeen Garg	Background Humming
2000	Sparsh	"Kya Hone Laga Mujhe"	Zubeen Garg	Zubeen Garg	Zubeen Garg, Mahalaxmi Iyer	Also appears in her album Mere Liye and Zubeen's album Nupur.
2001	Mere Liye	"Mere Liye" (Title Song)	Sagarika	Sagarika	Solo	
2001	Nupur	"Kaisa Dhuan Uth Raha Hai"	Zubeen Garg	Zubeen Garg	Zubeen Garg, Anindita Paul	

== Hindi television songs ==
Year	Television(s)	Song	Composer(s)	Writer(s)	Co-singer(s)
1995	Kash-m-kash	"Aaj Aasman Se"	Raju Singh	Gauhar Kanpuri	Sonu Nigam, Jonkey Borthakur

== Assamese film songs ==
Year	Film	Song	Composer(s)	Writer(s)	Co-singer(s)	Notes	
1999	Morom Nadir Gabhoru Gaat	"Tumar Gaon Khoni Dhuniya"	Atul Medhi	Unknown	Solo	Her first assamese songs was recorded as an adult playback singers.	
1999	Morom Nadir Gabhoru Gaat	"Bukure Bhaxa Mur" (Version 2)	Atul Medhi	Unknown			
1999	Maharathi	Oi Mur Axomor Prothom Aakhar	Manash Hazarika	Unknonwn	Various		
1999	Maharathi	"Hun Nalage Rup Nalage" (Female Version)	Manash Hazarika	Unknonwn	Solo	Only available on Audio CD as Bonus Track which did not feature in the film; Male Version is also available as option sung by Zubeen Garg.	
2000	Hiya Diya Niya	Untitled Hidden Track (Background Score)	Zubeen Garg	Zubeen Garg	Shaan, Zubeen Garg	Only available on Audio CD as "Hidden Track" following five minutes of silences after the end of final listed track "Mitha Mitha". It is not mentioned on the back cover.	
2000	Jon Jole Kopalot	"Hojao Geetare Godhuli"	Jayanta Das	Zubeen Garg, Mrinalkanti Medhi	Shaan, Babul Supriyo, Mahalakshmi Iyer		
2000	Jon Jole Kopalot	"Duru Duru Kope"	Jayanta Das		Shaan		
2000	Jogantoror Tezal Pua	"Bujilu Nubujila Urvashi"	Debajit Chaudhary	Unknown	Ritu Bikash, Debajit Chaudhary, Aparna Dutta Chaudhary, Shanta Uzir		
2001	Garam Botah	"Tenekoi Nesaba"	Jatin Sharma	Zubeen Garg	Zubeen Garg	Also appears in Assamese Film "Aei Morom Tumar Babe" as CD Bonus Track and in Assamese Album "Mayabini".	
2001	Garam Botah	"Bohag Mahot Gosor Dalot"	Jatin Sharma	Manas Robin	Zubeen Garg, Kumar Bhabesh, Dilip Fernandez	Background Humming, It is also known as "Assamese 12 Months Song"	
2001	Aei Morom Tumar Babe	"Nijanote Bukur Tote" (Female Version)	Bhupen Uzir	Unknown	Solo	Male Version is also available as option which was sung by her brother.	
2001	Aei Morom Tumar Babe	"Jonake Uposa"	Bhupen Uzir	Hemanta Dutta	Shaan		
2001	Aei Morom Tumar Babe	Untitled Song (Background Score)	Bhupen Uzir	Unknown	Shaan	Only appears as "Hidden track" after the end of final listed track.	
2001	Nayak	"Mon Ghonot"	Zubeen Garg	Zubeen Garg	Shaan, Zubeen Garg, Mahalakshmi Iyer, Pamela Jain		
2002	Eman Morom Kiyo Lage	"Ture Sobi"	Manoj Sharma	Zubeen Garg	Zubeen Garg, Shaan	Backing Vocalist	
2002	Prem Aru Prem	"Baar Moja Nohoi"	Zubeen Garg	Diganta Bharati	Zubeen Garg, Kashmiri Saikia, Nirmali Das		
Jonaki Mon	"Phule Phule Aji Huoni"	Assamese	Zubeen Garg	Zubeen Garg	Shaan, Zubeen Garg, Arnab, Pamela Jain		
2006	Snehabandhan	"Rod Pore Sutalot" (Female Version)	Assamese	Nanda Banerjee	Unknown	Solo	
2026	Roi Roi Binale	"Mukuta Mukuta"	Assamese	Zubeen Garg		Students of Abhinaya, Zubeen Garg	While she sang as a chorus, she remain uncredited. This song was never used in the film.

== Assamese non-film songs ==
Year	Album	Song	Composer(s)	Writer(s)	Co-singer(s)	Notes
1998	Pansoi	"Door Duronire Mon Junaki Mon"	Zubeen Garg	Zubeen Garg	Zubeen Garg	
1999	Megha	"Mon Uroniya"	Dhrubajyoti Phukan	Unknown	Solo	
1999	Meghor Boron	"Purnima Jun Tumi"	Zubeen Garg	Zubeen Garg	Zubeen Garg, Udit Narayan, Mahalakshmi Iyer	

== Bengali film songs ==
Year	Film	Song	Composer(s)	Writer(s)	Co-singer(s)	Notes
2002	Duityo	Unknown Bengali Song	Unknown	Unknown	Babul Supriyo	
2003	Adorni	"Neesha Neesha Ei Raate"	Babukrishan	Priyo Chattopandhya	Shaan	
2004	Shudhu Tumi	"Gun Gun Gunjare"	Zubeen Garg	Unknown	Shreya Ghoshal	
2004	Premi	"Mone Rekho Amar Ea Gaan" (Female Version)	Jeet Gannguli		Shreya Ghoshal	
2004	Premi	"Bujhi Sob"	Sagarika		Solo	This song contains a hidden track and is not listed on the back of the CD soundtrack. Later, the song was finally listed in the album Tomar Aakash.
2006	Priyotoma	"Ae Kemon Chelebana"	Jeet Gannguli	Unknown	Shreya Ghoshal	

== Bengali non-film songs ==
Year	Album	Song	Composer(s)	Writer(s)	Co-singer(s)	Notes
1997	Surer Upahar	"Je Kothati"	Sudeep-Sumit	Sumeet Acahrya	Zubeen Garg	Her first Bengali album, only as a backing vocalist
1997	Surer Upahar	"Ronge Howa Swapno"	Sudeep-Sumit	Sumeet Acahrya	Mausami Saharia	Her first Bengali album, only as a backing vocalist
1999		"Jhiri Jhiri Ei Borosha"	Unknown	Unknown	Zubeen Garg	Although these songs were initially recorded in 1999, originally as part of Zubeen's second Bengali album, they were never made available to the public. This was her only Bengali duet song featuring Zubeen Garg and it stands as one of the few Zubeen songs that went unreleased. Subsequently, it has occasionally appeared in bootleg or demo tapes.
2004	Tomar Aakash	"Kopal Thakay"	Shaan	Manas Mukherjee	Solo	
2004	Tomar Aakash	"Bujhi Sob"	Sagarika	Manas Mukherjee	Solo	Originally taken from the film Premi as a hidden track which is not listed on the back cover of the CD soundtrack.
2019	Misti Kothay Vulona	"Sathire"			Solo	
2019	Misti Kothay Vulona	Tomar Chokhe			Solo	
2019	Misti Kothay Vulona	"Bhalobasar Mato"			Solo	
2019	Misti Kothay Vulona	"Bhramar Koiyo"			Solo	
2019	Misti Kothay Vulona	"Chal Chula Na Thakleo"			Solo	
2019	Misti Kothay Vulona	"A Maton Kene"			Solo	
2019	Misti Kothay Vulona	"Kalar Banshi"			Solo	
2019	Misti Kothay Vulona	"Bhultake Jene Shune"			Solo	
2019	Misti Kothay Vulona	"Kothay Chole Geli"			Solo	
2019	Misti Kothay Vulona	"Kato Je Swapna Asha"			Solo	
