= Bombay Girl =

Studio album by Alisha
- Released: May 1994 (Cassette); January 1995 (CD)
- Recorded: 1993
- Genre: Indipop
- Length: 72:23
- Label: Magnasound

Alisha chronology
| Alisha - Madonna of India (1992) | Bombay Girl (1994) | Made In India (1995) |

Lesle Lewis chronology
| Dhuan (1991) | Bombay Girl (1994) | Colonial Cousins (1996) |

Sonu Nigam chronology
| Bewafa Sanam Vol 5 (1994) | Bombay Girl (1994) | Sapne Ki Baat (1997) |

Bombay Girl is a 1994 Hindi-language pop album by Indian pop singer Alisha Chinai. The album marked a rebranding of the singer from the western image and sound of the platinum-selling Babydoll and Madonna albums for His Master's Voice, to a new more wholesome image for Magnasound. It was first released in May 1994 on Cassette and later, in January 1995 on CD. It was also Sonu Nigam's first Indipop album.

== Track listing ==
| No. | Title | Artist(s) | Length |
|---|---|---|---|
| 1. | "De De" | Alisha Chinai | 4:11 |
| 2. | "Bombay Girl" | Alisha Chinai | 5:18 |
| 3. | "Sona Sona Mera Sona" | Alisha Chinai | 3:47 |
| 4. | "Justjoo" | Alisha Chinai | 5:35 |
| 5. | "I Love You Baby" | Alisha Chinai | 4:10 |
| 6. | "Ayega" | Alisha Chinai | 5:20 |
| 7. | "Kal Hi Ki Baat Hai" | Alisha Chinai, Sonu Nigam | 4:45 |
| 8. | "Love Crazy" | Alisha Chinai | 3:57 |
| 9. | "Damadam Mast Kalandar" | Ila Arun | 3:54 |
| 10. | "Aap Jaisa Koi" | Nazia Hasan | 4:07 |
| 11. | "Ni Main Yaar Manana Ni" | Sonali Bajpayee | 4:53 |
| 12. | "Muthu Kudi" | Hema Sardesai | 5:27 |
| 13. | "Dam Maro Dam" | Nalini Dave, Sagarika | 3:46 |
| 14. | "Phir Teri Yaad" | Sonu Nigam | 4:58 |
| 15. | "Culture Mix" | Shaan | 3:46 |
| 16. | "Mehbooba" | Jolly Mukherjee, Hema Sardesai | 4:36 |
| Total length: | | | 72:30 |

Notes

- Track 9 to 16 are Bonus Track and only present in Audio CD.
