= Magnasound Records =

Indian record company

Magnasound
- Type: Private
- Industry: Music entertainment
- Founded: 1989
- Defunct: 2003
- Headquarters: Mumbai, India
- Key people: Shashi Gopal, chief managing director Kalpana Gopal, director Madhav Das, director

Magnasound was an Indian record company that specialized in Indian classical music, Indian rock and Indipop. It was distributed by OMI Music Inc. Shashi Gopal was the managing director of Magnasound.

== History ==
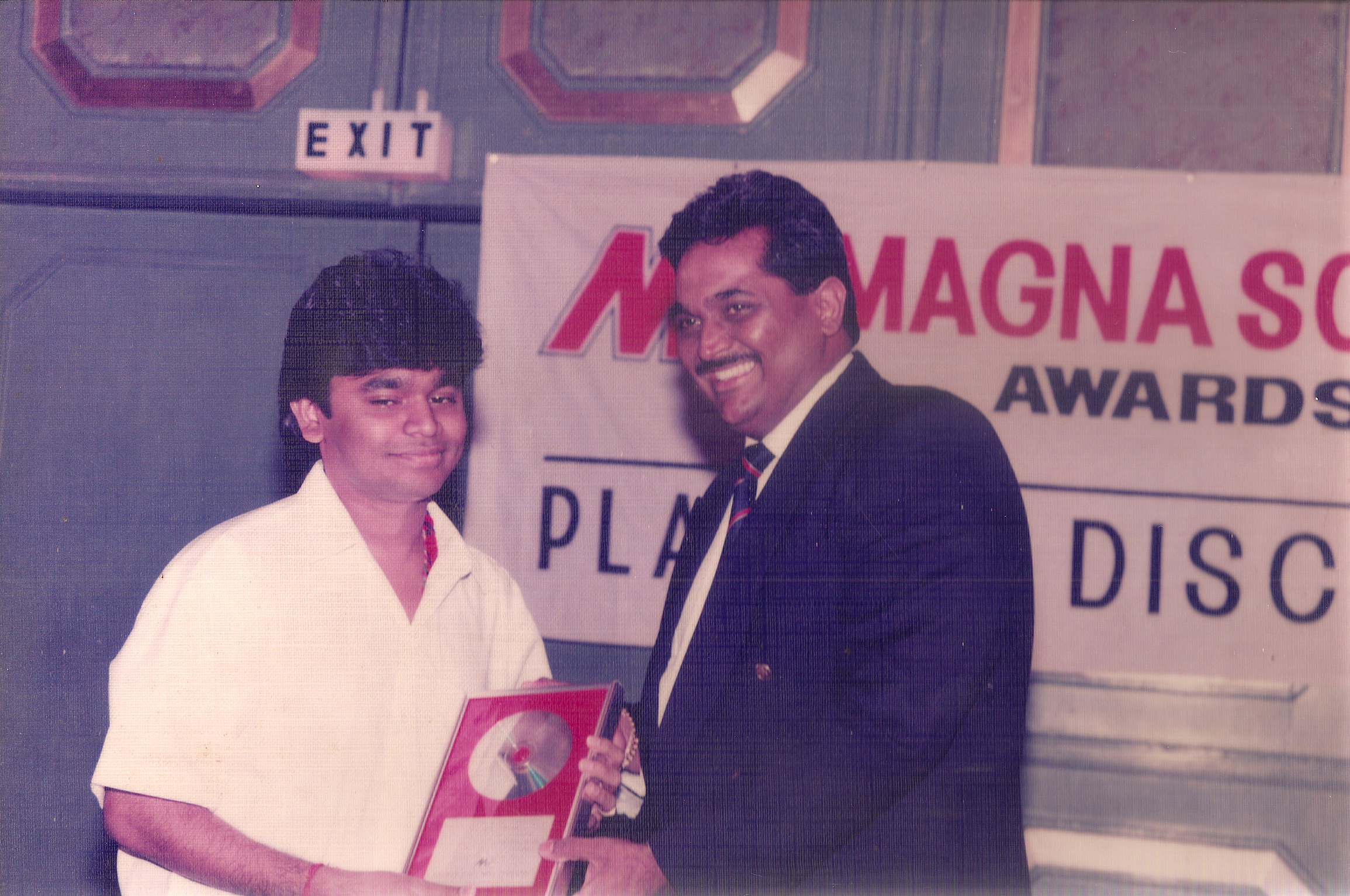
A. R. Rahman receiving a Platinum Award at the MagnaSound Awards

Shashi Gopal founded Magnasound in 1989 with his wife Kalpana and brother-in-law Madhav Das. The three launched the company with their life savings, which totaled Rs 6 lakhs. In the early 1990s, the company gained a reputation for signing young artists like Daler Mehndi, Baba Sehgal, and Alisha Chinai, as well as acclaimed rock bands Rock Machine and 13AD

Established artists such as A. R. Rahman and Asha Bhosle also released albums for the label.

=== Bayshore ===
After Magnasound wound up in 2003, Madhav launched another label, Bayshore Music, before he moved to print and edited a film magazine called South Side, for GV Films.

== Discography ==
Year	Album Title	Artist(s)	Notes/Ref.
1990	Dilruba	Baba Sehgal	
1991	Alien Desire	Jasmine Bharucha	
1992	Thanda Thanda Pani	Baba Sehgal	First Indian rap album
1992	The Chronic	Dr. Dre	
1993	Johnny Jokers	Shweta Shetty	
1993	Raaga Raaga	K.S. Chithra, Voodoo	First Indian pop album to release in Compact Disc Digital Audio and also first album to enter Compact Disc digital audio in Tamil Nadu state and South India region.
1993	Doggy Style	Snoop Doggy Dogg	
1994	Style Bhai	Style Bhai	
1994	Dr. Dhingra	Baba Sehgal	
1994	Bombay Girl	Alisha Chinai	
1994	Mix Masala	Various	
1995	The New Album	Shweta Shetty, Shaan	
1995	Made in India	Alisha Chinai	First Indian album to manufactured Compact Disc Digital Audio in India
1995	Dole Dole	Suchitra Krishnamoorthy	First album to enter Compact disc digital audio in Andhra Pradesh state.
1995	Bolo Ta Ra Ra	Daler Mehndi	First Punjabi pop album
1995	Oorja	Various	Remix album
1995	Roop Inka Mastana	Shaan, Stylebhai, Sagarika, Suchitra Krishnamoorthy, Kaushal	Remix album First album to enter Compact disc digital audio in West Bengal state.
1996	Zubeenor Gaan	Zubeen Garg, Mahalakshmi Iyer, Hema Sardesai	CD issues only
1996	Naujawan	Shaan, Sagarika	First Indian siblings album
1996	Oohalu	Suchitra Krishnamoorthy	First Telugu Pop album
1996	Dardi Rab Rab	Daler Mehndi	
1996	Dum Tara	Suchitra Krishnamoorthy	
1996	Channel Hits	Various	Compilation album
1996	Colonial Cousins	Colonial Cousins	
1996	Janna Hai Bollywood	Models	First Indian girl band album
1997	Ho Jayengi Bale Bale	Daler Mehndi	
1997	Love-Ology	Shaan	First album to enter Compact Disc Digital Audio in Assam and North-East region.
1997	Chand Sa Mukhda	Ali Haider	
1997	A-Ha	Suchitra Krishnamoorthy	
1997	Colgate - A Reason to Smile	Various	
1998	Deewane To Deewane Hai	Shweta Shetty	
1998	Tu	Sonu Nigam	
1998	Maa	Sagarika	
1998	Tunak Tunak Tun	Daler Mehndi	
1998	Lolipop	Bina Mistry	
1998	The Best of Biddu	Biddu	Compilation album
1999	Hunaru - 99	Zubeen Garg, Mahalakshmi Iyer, Bhitali Das	Bihu album
1999	Hulle Hullare	Rajeshwari Sachdev	
1999	Mausam	Sonu Nigam	
1999	Sanskar	Sonu Nigam	
1999	Savariya	3 Brothers & A Violin	
1999	Hello	Shael Oswal	
2000	Dur	Strings	
2000	Kaisa Hai Ye Jaado	Bela Shende	
2000	Mukhda Piya Ka	Rajeshwari Sachdev	
2001	Meri Jaan	Vasundhara Das	

== Notable artists ==
- A.R. Rahman
- Alisha Chinai
- Baba Sehgal
- Bela Shende
- Bhitali Das
- Bilal Maqsood
- Bina Mistry
- Bombay Jayashri
- Faisal Kapadia
- Hariharan
- Hema Sardesai
- Jasmine Bharucha
- Kumar Sanu
- Leslee Lewis
- Mehnaz Hoosein
- P. Unnikrishnan
- Raageshwari
- Sagarika Mukherjee
- Shael Oswal
- Shantanu Mukherjee
- Shweta Mohan
- Shweta Shetty
- Sonu Nigam
- Suchitra Krishnamoorti
- Suchitra Pillai
- Udit Narayan
- Zubeen Garg
