= N1000 series =

N1000 series may refer to the following:

- Keikyu N1000 series
- Nagoya Municipal Subway N1000 series
