= Kamasutra (Alisha Chinai album) =

Studio album by Alisha
- Released: 1990
- Recorded: 1990
- Genre: Indipop
- Label: His Master's Voice
- Producer: Alisha

Alisha chronology
Madonna (1989)	Kamasutra (1990)	Alisha - Madonna of India (1992)

Kamasutra is a 1990 Hindi-language platinum-selling pop album by Indipop star Alisha Chinai.

== Track listing ==
1. Kamasutra / कामसूत्र
2. Main Aur Tu / मैं और तू
3. Intezaar / इंतज़ार
4. Rota Hai Kyoon Mera Dil / रोता है क्यूं मेरा दिल
5. Jhoom Baby Jhoom / झूम बेबी झूम
6. Vote For Alisha / वोट फॉर अलीशा
7. Hai Gam, Humdam / है गम हमदम
8. Dancing Queen / डांसिंग कुईन
