= N1000 =

N1000, N-1000, N.1000, N 1000 may represent:

- Keikyu N1000 series, a train type in Japan
- Nagoya Municipal Subway N1000 series, a train type in Japan
- PSP-N1000 PlayStation Portable, see PSP Go
- N1000, a series in the Compaq Evo product line
- N1000, a 1 MW two-bladed wind turbine produced by Nordic Windpower
