= Made in India (album) =

Studio album by Alisha Chinai
- Released: April 26, 1995 (Audio Cassette); May 8, 1995 (Audio CD)
- Genre: Indipop
- Length: 36:12 (Audio Cassette); 50:22 (Audio CD)
- Label: Magnasound
- Producer: Biddu

Alisha Chinai chronology
Bombay Girl (1994)	Made in India (1995)	Om (1998)

Biddu chronology
Johnny Joker (1993)	Made in India (1995)	Naujawan (1996)

Singles from Made in India
- 1. "Made in India" Released: 2 April 1995; 2. "Lover Girl" Released: 12 April 1995

Made in India is a 1995 Indi-pop album by Alisha Chinai, with production by Biddu. It was the first album by an Indian pop (Indipop) artist to be sold on a scale comparable to Hindi film music albums, with over five million copies sold in India. The album established Indipop as a discrete genre and its singer Chinai became the genre's main proponent.

== Development ==
Biddu originally wrote the song "Made in India" for the famous Pakistani popstar Nazia Hassan, who Biddu had previously worked with. However, Hassan refused to come out of retirement for the song, as she thought the lyrics may offend her fans in Pakistan. After Hassan rejected the offer, Biddu then wrote the song for Alisha Chinai.

== Reception ==
Made in India went on to become one of the highest selling pop albums of its time and Chinai became a household name. The record sold over 5 million copies in India, and the album's title song was not only a hit in India but across the international market as well, topping charts across Asia. Chinai thereafter became the central figure of the emergence of Indipop. Made in India was the first ever Indian pop album to achieve commercial success on a par with Indian film music albums and it also marked a spectacular beginning to the era of Indian music videos. It also became the first non-film album to break unit sales records in India.

== Controversy ==
During the release of Made in India, Chinai had accused Anu Malik of molesting her. Some outlets claimed that it was a publicity stunt by the singer to promote her album. Thereafter, Malik and Chinai did not work for several years, only to reunite in 2003 with Ishq Vishk. Chinai had also accused Magnasound Records of cheating her of her royalties. The music company counter-sued her for defamation.

== Track listing ==
No.	Title	Length
1.	"Made in India"	4:26
2.	"Lover Girl"	4:46
3.	"Dil"	4:57
4.	"Tu Kahaan"	4:45
5.	"Ek Baar Do Baar"	4:21
6.	"Aajaa"	4:21
7.	"Mere Saath"	4:15
8.	"Oo La La"	4:17
9.	"Dhadkan"	4:19
10.	"Made in India" (The Mother India Mix)	5:37
11.	"De De"	4:13
Total length:		50:22

Notes

- Track 9 and 10 are bonus tracks, which are only present in the audio CD version.
- Track 11 originally appeared on her previous studio album Bombay Girl, and it appears only on the audio CD version of this album.

== Awards ==
- Alisha Chinai received the International Billboard Award and also won the Freddie Mercury Award for Artistic Excellence for the album Made in India.

== Other versions ==
In 2017, "Made in India" was recreated by Pawni Pandey. In 2022, it was sampled for a recreation by the Indian-American hip hop artist Raja Kumari.

== Sales ==
Region	Certification	Certified units/sales
India	—	5,000,000
