= Aah... Alisha! =

Aah.. Alisha

Studio album by Alisha
- Released: 1986
- Studio: Rave Recording Studios
- Genre: Indipop
- Label: Gramophone Company India
- Producer: Louis Banks, Rajesh Johri

Alisha chronology
Jaadoo (1985)	Aah.. Alisha (1986)	Babydoll (1988)

Aah... Alisha! is the second studio album by Indi-pop star Alisha Chinai, released in 1986. The album went on to become a platinum-selling Hindi-language pop album. As well as singing each song, she factored heavily in the production, having co-written seven of the eight songs.

== Track listing ==
1. Babusha (Banks, Johri, Alisha)
2. Kissko Dil De Doon (Johri, Alisha)
3. Sayani (Johri)
4. Aaja (Alisha, Johri)
5. Gungunane Laga Hai Dil (Johri, Alisha, Ila Arun)
6. Taara (Banks, Alisha)
7. Jannat (Johri, Alisha)
8. Aah...Alisha! (Johri, Arun)
