= 5050 =

5050 or variation, may refer to:

- A.D. 5050, a year in the 6th millennium CE
- 5050 BC, a year in the 6th millennium BCE
- 5050 (number), a number in the 5000s range
- 5050 Doctorwatson, an asteroid in the Asteroid Belt, the 5050th asteroid registered
- Nagoya Municipal Subway 5050 series, an electric multiple unit train type
- Tobu 5050 series, a variant of the Tobu 5000 series electric multiple unit train type
- Tokyu 5050 series, an electric multiple unit train type
- USAir Flight 5050, a 1989 flight that crashed on takeoff from LaGuardia, New York City, US
- The Sequence of the first 100 numbers

== See also ==
- Fifty-Fifty (disambiguation)
- 50 (disambiguation)
- 5050x2020
