= Hema Sardesai =

Indian playback singer

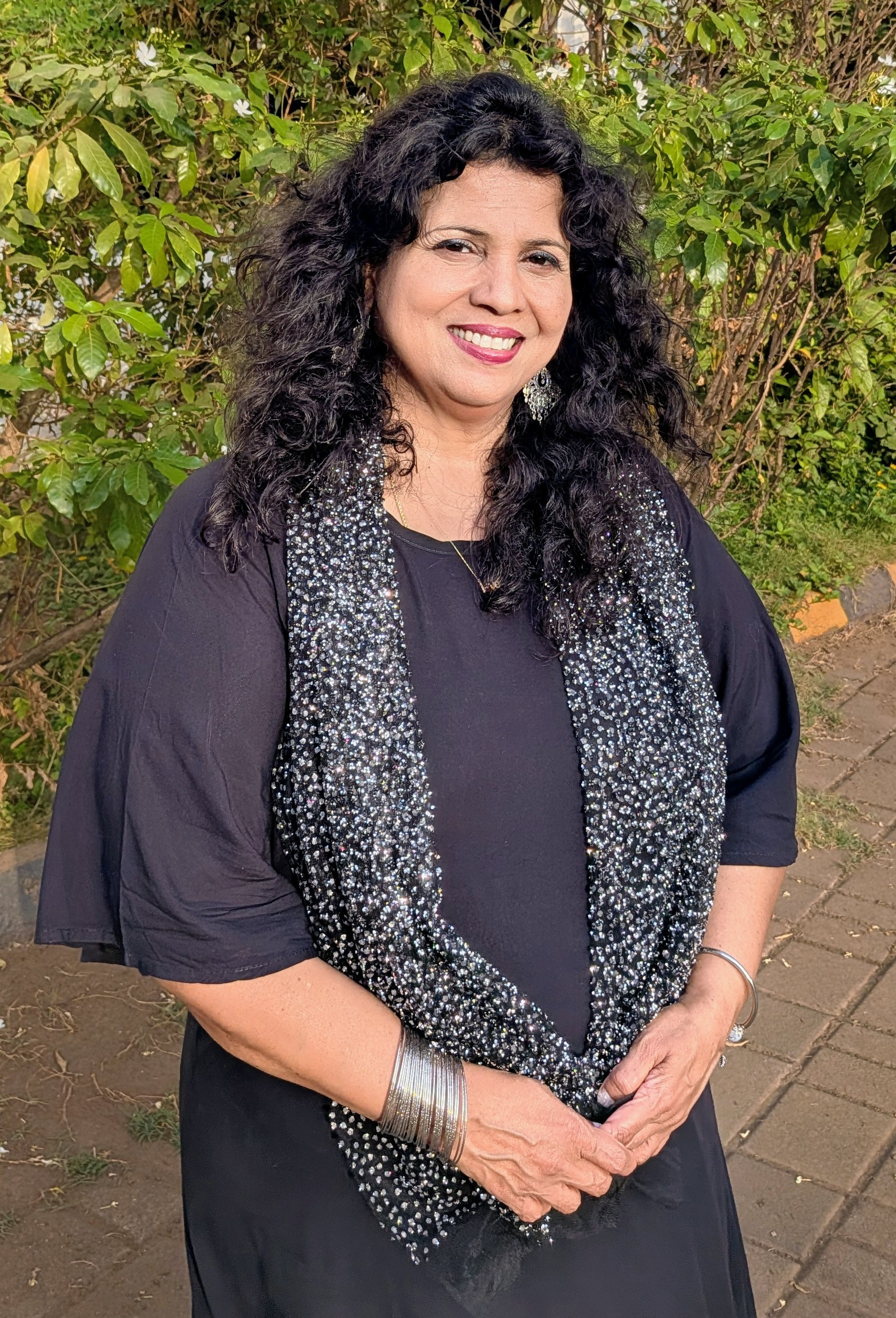
- Sardesai in 2026

Background information
- Born: Bombay, Maharashtra, India
- Genres: Indian classical music, Folk, Indipop
- Occupations: Singer, Playback singer, Composer, Lyricist
- Instrument: Vocalist
- Years active: 1987–present
- Spouse: Xavier D'Souza (died 2020)

Hema Sardesai is an Indian playback singer and lyricist based in Goa, India. Born in Bombay, Maharashtra, she shot to fame in the 1990s with songs from movies like Sapnay, Soldier, Biwi No.1 and Jaanam Samjha Karo.

== Early life ==
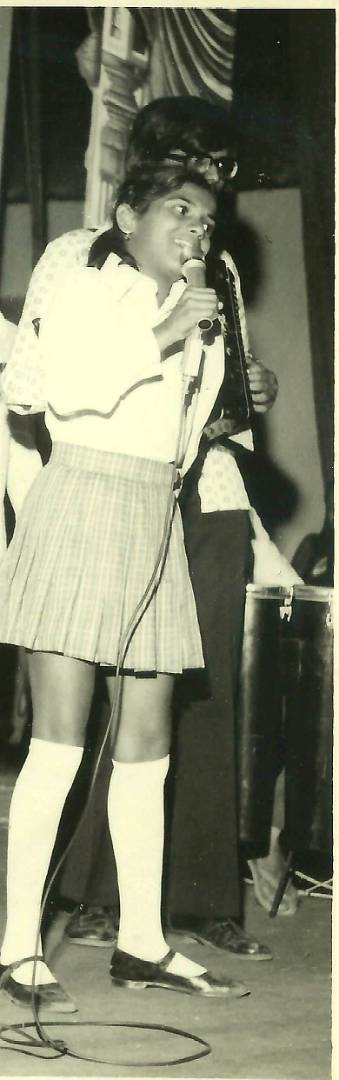
A young Sardesai performing, c.1979

Hema Sardesai was born to Kumudini Sardesai (hailing from Parra) and Dr Kashinath Sardesai (hailing from Savoi-Verem, who had previously been the cricket captain for Goa) and is the younger of their two daughters. Her talent was first discovered at the age of six by her school teacher, Late Mrs. Sequiera. She is an alumna of Sharada Mandir School, and was born and brought up in Boca de Vaca, a locality of Panaji. She made her stage debut at the age of 8 years, at a Navratri Festival, where the local Gujarati Samaj encouraged her. She has accomplished the Sangeet Visharad in Indian classical music (with Pandit Sudhakar Karandikar as her first guru) and has always been passionate about Western Pop music.

== Career ==
Sardesai has sung several songs for Bollywood films, and has released her first album Gone is the Summer in 1990. Later, she released several Indipop albums such as Love & Dance (1991), Sargam (1993), Zubeenor Gaan (1996), Love-Ology (1997), Punjaban (1998), Hindustani Gudiya (1998), Piya Se Milka Aaye Nain (1999) and Sajnaa (2001). She is particularly known for singing "Aawara Bhawren Jo Hole Hole Gaaye" in the Hindi dubbed version of 1997 film Sapnay, which featured Kajol in the lead role. Some of her other famous songs include "Ishq Sona Hai" (Biwi No.1), "Chali Chali Phir Chali" (Baghban) and "Badal Pe Paon Hai" (Chak De! India). She is the only Indian singer to win the Grand Prix at the International Pop Song Festival in Germany, has sung at the International UNICEF Concert in Europe and became the only female singer other than Lata Mangeshkar to perform at the celebrations for the 50th year of India's Independence day.

In 2011, Sardesai digitised her music on artistaloud.com.

In 2013, Sardesai wrote and sang three Konkani songs for the English film The Coffin Maker, starring Naseeruddin Shah. The film was based in a Goan village and was selected for the Indian Panorama section of IFFI 2013. It is about a coffin maker who learns about life in an unusual manner. The film went on to win the Best Feature Film Award at the Florence Indian Film Festival in 2013.

In 2017, Sardesai announced her debut in USA, with her song "Power of Love", working with Mishal Raheja and Grammy Award winner Jared Lee Gosselin on the project.

In May 2024, Sardesai made her debut on the Konkani tiatr stage in the play I am Sorry by Irineu Gonsalves.

== Discography ==
=== Studio albums ===
| Year | Album | Record label |
|---|---|---|
| 1990 | Gone is the Summer | Music India |
| 1991 | Love & Dance | Music India |
| 1993 | Sargam | Regional Music Centre |
| 1996 | Zubeenor Gaan | NK Production |
| 1997 | Love-Ology | Magnasound |
| 1998 | Call Me Eternity | Padmini Music |
| 1998 | When Loves Calls | Padmini Music |
| 1998 | Punjaban | Merica Records |
| 1998 | Hindustani Gudiya | Venus Music (now Ishtar Music) |
| 1999 | Piya Se Milke Aaye Nayan | Tips |
| 2003 | Saajna | Universal Music Group |

=== Singles ===
- "Power of Love" (feat. Mishaal) (2017)

=== Soundtracks ===
| Year | Film | Songs | Music Director | |
|---|---|---|---|---|
| 1989 | Goonj | "Sama Ye Suhana" "Jawani Ke Din Hai" | Biddu | |
| 1994 | Prem Yog | "Chhodo Nasha" "Nazro Me Aisi Basi" | Bappi Lahiri | |
| 1996 | Tere Mere Sapne | "Tere Mere Sapne" | Viju Shah | |
| 1996 | Dastak | "Piya Piya" | Rajesh Roshan | |
| 1997 | Sapnay (Dubbed version) | "Awaara Bhawren" | A. R. Rehman | |
| 1997 | Pardes | "Nahin Hona Tha" "My First Day in USA" "Yeh Dil Deewana" | Nadeem-Shravan | |
| 1997 | Gupt | "Gupt Gupt (title track)" | Viju Shah | |
| 1997 | Aar Ya Paar | "Hulle Hulle" | Viju Shah | |
| 1998 | Zor | "Tere Pyaar Mein" "Mein Kudi Anjaani Ho" | Agosh (Band) | |
| 1998 | Salaakhen | "Punajbi Kudi Maare Jhatke" | Dilip Sen-Sameer Sen | |
| 1998 | Sham Ghansham | "Aandi Hain Jaandi Hain" | Vishal Bharadwaj | |
| 1998 | Soldier | "Hum Toh Dil Chahe Tumhara" | Anu Malik | |
| 1998 | Keemat | "Koi Nahi Tere Jaisa" | Rajesh Roshan | |
| 1999 | Biwi No.1 | "Ishq Sona Hai" "Jungle Hai Aadhi Raat Hai" | Anu Malik | |
| 1999 | Mann | "Kehna Hai Tumse Kehna" | Sanjeev-Darshan | |
| 1999 | Jaanam Samjha Karo | "Jaanam Samjha Karo" "Mai Ladki Akeli" | Anu Malik | |
| 1999 | Hogi Pyaar Ki Jeet | "Kaun Hain Woh" "Hogi Pyaar Ki Jeet" | Anand-Milind | |
| 1999 | Kaala Samrajya | "O My Love!" | Anand-Milind | |
| 2000 | Astitva | "Kitne Kisse Hain Tere Mere" | | |
| 2000 | Pukar | "Humrahi Jab Ho Mastana" | A. R. Rehman | |
| 2000 | Josh | "Apun Bola Tu" "O Maria" | Anu Malik | |
| 2000 | Champion | "Jatt Lutiya Gaya" | Shankar Sahney, Hema Sardesai | Anand Raj Anand |
| 2000 | Hamara Dil Aapke Paas Hai | "I Love You" | Sanjeev-Darshan | |
| 2000 | Kunwara | "Na Heera Na Moti" | Aadesh Shrivastava | |
| 2000 | Tere Pyar Mein | "Kal Thi Mohabbat" | Amjad Bobby | |
| 2000 | Joru Ka Ghulam | "Tumhare Bina Kuch" | Aadesh Shrivastava | |
| 2001 | Aśoka | "San Sanana" | Anu Malik | |
| 2001 | Yaadein | "Eli Re Eli" | Anu Malik | |
| 2001 | Mujhe Meri Biwi Se Bachaao | "Naach Meri Jaan" | Rajesh Roshan | |
| 2001 | Koi Mere Dil Se Poochhe | "Aawara Main Badal" | Rajesh Roshan | |
| 2001 | Ittefaq | "Tanana Dhir Tanana" | Dilip Sen-Sameer Sen | |
| 2002 | Roshini | "Main To Bas Teri Hu Piya" | Anand-Milind | |
| 2003 | Baghban | "Chali Chali Phir Chali Chali" | Aadesh Shrivastava | |
| 2003 | Market | "Khalli Valli" | Jani Babu | |
| 2003 | Qayamat: City Under Threat | "Qayamat Qayamat" | Nadeem-Sharavan | |
| 2003 | Khushi | "Hai Re Hai Re" | Anu Malik | |
| 2003 | Zameen | "Tere Sang Ek Simple Si Coffee" "Mere Naal" | Himesh Reshamiya | |
| 2003 | Footpath | "Soorat Pe Teri Pyar Aave " | Himesh Reshamiya | |
| 2003 | Asambhav | "Asambhav" | Viju Shah | |
| 2004 | Musafir | "Sun Suniyo" | Anand Raaj Anand | |
| 2005 | Garam Masala | "Chori Chori" | Pritam | |
| 2006 | Sandwich | "Gabbroo" | | |
| 2006 | Sandwich | "Bahut Chalu Hai Saala" | | |
| 2007 | Chak De! India | "Badal Pe Paon Hai" | Salim–Sulaiman | |
| 2012 | The Victim | "Kallzam Amchim" | | |
| 2013 | The Coffin Maker | "Mogachi Donuch Uttraan" "Geli Birant" "Maya Ya" | | |

== Personal life ==
=== Family ===
Sardesai was married to Xavier D'Souza, who was an investment banker hailing from Cunchelim. He had previously been a hockey player for the Nehru Cup. He died in 2020 of cardiac arrest.

=== Community work ===
Sardesai is active in many social causes, such as: save the girl child, women empowerment, anti-SEZ, Goa Special Status, eco-friendly Ganesh idols, priority for locals for jobs in Goa.

== Awards and accolades ==
- 1989 – 16th International Pop Song Festival, Grand Prix in Germany
- 2006 – All India Woman's Conference, Gomant Tejaswini Award for her outstanding achievements in the music field.
- October 9, 2015, Hemaa was honoured with the Icon of the Year award at the 35th Brands Academy Awards evening.
- March 2015, Hemaa was also honoured with the Woman of the Year award, by Very. The event honours a leading lady of substance every year, for her unparalleled contribution to society across various fields.
- March 2015, Hemaa was selected for the Karmaveer Puraskaar award held in New Delhi for her able activity to many a social cause, above all for her silent contribution to the causes.
- August 2014, Hemaa was honoured with the PHD Excellence award in New Delhi.
- Hemaa was awarded the Hiramanek award titled International Women Achievers award, for her achievements.
- Hemaa is also the recipient of the International Achievers Award at the International Women's Conference of Art of Living.
- MTV Immies nominated Hemaa as 'Best Female Singer', for her song 'Qayamat' from the film Qayamat.
