= Babydoll (album) =

Studio album by Alisha
- Released: 1988
- Genre: Indipop
- Label: Gramophone Company India

Alisha chronology
Aah...Alisha! (1986)	Babydoll (1988)	Madonna (1989)

Babydoll is a 1988 Hindi-language platinum-selling pop album by Indipop star Alisha Chinai. The success of the Babydoll album, and that of Suneeta Rao's album Senorita (1989), encouraged the label to promote other early Indipop stars such as Ali Haider (1990). The album was reportedly India's "first fully computerised album". The sound engineer was Rajesh Johri, alias 'Wizkid', Alisha's husband.

== Track listing ==
1. Babydoll / बेबी डॉल
2. Superman
3. Kootchie Koo
4. Jaane Jaana
5. Shor Sharaaba
6. Mashooka
7. For Adults Only
8. Pyaar
9. Babydoll (Reprise)
