= 50–50 club =

50-50 club may refer to:

- 50–50 club in Major League Baseball, players who have achieved 50 home runs and 50 stolen bases in one season
  - Shohei Ohtani, the only Major League Baseball (MLB) player to have such a season
- 50–50 club in the National Hockey League, players who have scored 50 goals in 50 games
- The 50/50 Club, a Cincinnati television talk/variety show hosted by Ruth Lyons from 1953 to 1967

== See also ==
- Fifty-Fifty
