= Higashiyama Line =

Subway line in Nagoya, Japan

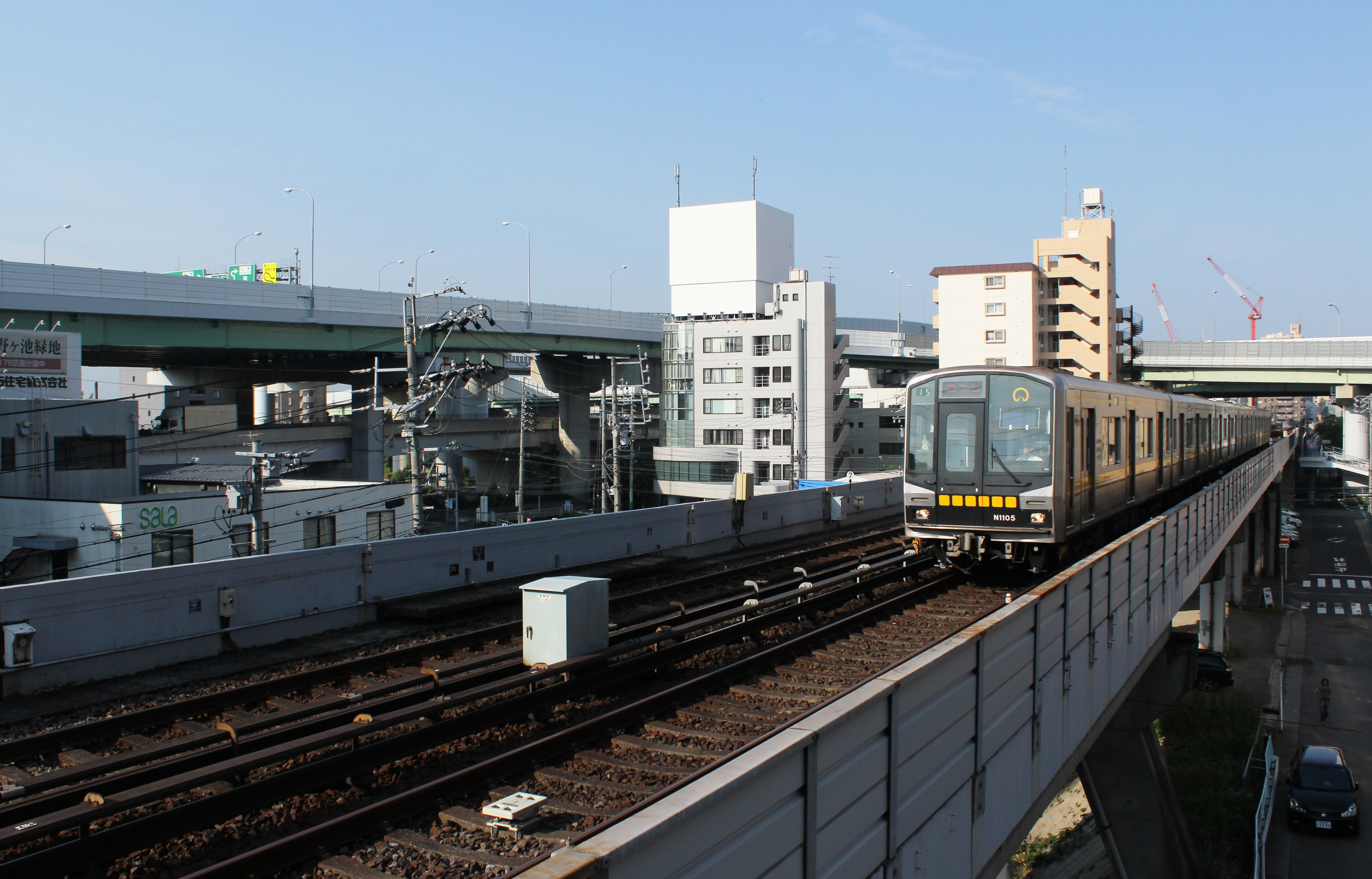
- An N1000 series EMU approaching Kamiyashiro Station in June 2015

Overview
- Native name: 東山線
- Locale: Nagoya, Japan
- Termini: Takabata; Fujigaoka
- Stations: 22

Service
- Type: Rapid transit
- System: Nagoya Municipal Subway
- Route number: 1
- Operator(s): Nagoya City Transportation Bureau
- Depot(s): Takabata, Fujigaoka
- Rolling stock: 5050 series N1000 series
- Daily ridership: 200,334 (2008)

History
- Opened: 15 November 1957; 68 years ago
- Last extension: 1982

Technical
- Track length: 20.6 km (12.8 mi)
- Track gauge: 1,435 mm (4 ft 8 1/2 in) standard gauge
- Electrification: 600 V DC third rail
- Operating speed: 65 km/h (40 mph)

The Higashiyama Line (東山線, Higashiyama-sen) is a subway line in Nagoya, Japan, part of the Nagoya Municipal Subway system. It runs from Takabata in Nakagawa Ward to Fujigaoka in Meitō Ward, all within Nagoya. The Higashiyama Line's color on maps is yellow and stations are labeled with the prefix "H". Officially, the line is called the Nagoya City Rapid Railway Line 1 (名古屋市高速度鉄道第1号線, Nagoya-shi Kōsokudo Tetsudō Dai-ichi-gō-sen). All stations accept manaca, a rechargeable contactless smart card, and other major Japanese IC cards.

The Higashiyama Line is the oldest on the system; the first section of the line opened in 1957. The line links Nagoya Station and Sakae, the CBD of Nagoya. As such, the line has the highest ridership among Nagoya Municipal Subway lines. Upon arrivals and departures at both Nagoya and Fujigaoka Stations, announcements are made in five languages: Japanese, English, Korean, Chinese, and Portuguese.

== Stations ==
All stations are in Nagoya, Aichi Prefecture.

No.	Station name	Japanese	Distance (km)		Transfers	Location
No.	Station name	Japanese	Between stations	Total	Transfers	Location
H01	Takabata	高畑	-	0.0		Nakagawa
H02	Hatta	八田	0.9	0.9	Kansai Main Line; Kintetsu Nagoya Line (Kintetsu-Hatta)	Nakagawa
H03	Iwatsuka	岩塚	1.1	2.0		Nakamura
H04	Nakamura Kōen	中村公園	1.1	3.1		Nakamura
H05	Nakamura Nisseki	中村日赤	0.8	3.9		Nakamura
H06	Honjin	本陣	0.7	4.6		Nakamura
H07	Kamejima	亀島	0.9	5.5		Nakamura
H08	Nagoya	名古屋	1.1	6.6	Chūō Main Line, Kansai Main Line, Tōkaidō Main Line, Tōkaidō Shinkansen; Kintetsu Nagoya Line (Kintetsu Nagoya); Meitetsu Nagoya Line (Meitetsu Nagoya); Sakura-dōri Line (S-02); Aonami Line (AN01)	Nakamura
H09	Fushimi	伏見	1.4	8.0	Tsurumai Line (T-07)	Naka
H10	Sakae	栄	1.0	9.0	Meitetsu Seto Line (Sakaemachi); Meijō Line (M-05)	Naka
H11	Shinsakae-machi	新栄町	1.1	10.1		Higashi
H12	Chikusa	千種	0.9	11.0	Chūō Main Line	Higashi
H13	Imaike	今池	0.7	11.7	Sakura-dōri Line (S-08)	Chikusa
H14	Ikeshita	池下	0.9	12.6		Chikusa
H15	Kakuōzan	覚王山	0.6	13.2		Chikusa
H16	Motoyama	本山	1.0	14.2	Meijō Line (M-17)	Chikusa
H17	Higashiyama Kōen (Higashiyama Park)	東山公園	0.9	15.1		Chikusa
H18	Hoshigaoka	星ヶ丘	1.1	16.2		Chikusa
H19	Issha	一社	1.3	17.5		Meitō
H20	Kamiyashiro	上社	1.1	18.6		Meitō
H21	Hongō	本郷	0.7	19.3		Meitō
H22	Fujigaoka	藤が丘	1.3	20.6	Linimo (L01)	Meitō

== History ==
The Higashiyama Line was the first underground rapid transit line in Nagoya, and it opened initially on 15 November 1957 with three stations. The three stations were Nagoya Station, Fushimimachi Station (now Fushimi), and Sakaemachi Station (now Sakae). At first, the subway had six 100 series EMU trainsets, formed with two cars per set.

The line was extended from Sakaemachi (now Sakae) to Ikeshita on June 15, 1960, from Ikeshita to Higashiyama Kōen on April 1, 1963, from Higashiyama Kōen to Hoshigaoka on March 30, 1967.

The line was simultaneously extended from Nagoya to Nakamura Kōen and from Hoshigaoka to its current eastern terminus of Fujigaoka on April 1, 1969. The line was further extended from Nakamura Kōen to its present western terminus of Takabata on September 21, 1982, and with that was completed as the line which operates today.

== Rolling stock ==
All trains are based at Takabata and Fujigaoka Depots.

- 5050 series (since 1992)
- N1000 series (since 2008)
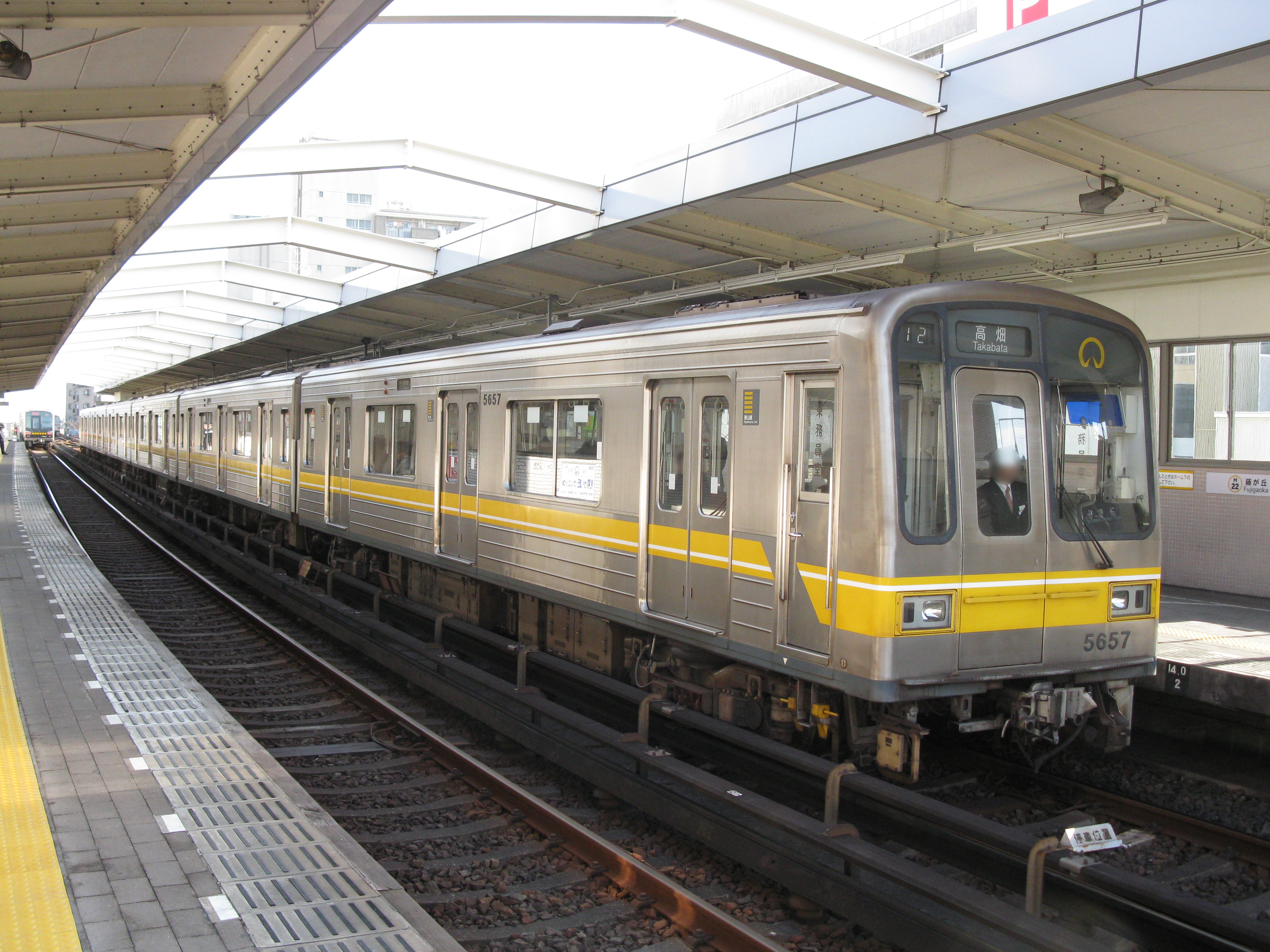
A 5050 series train in March 2010

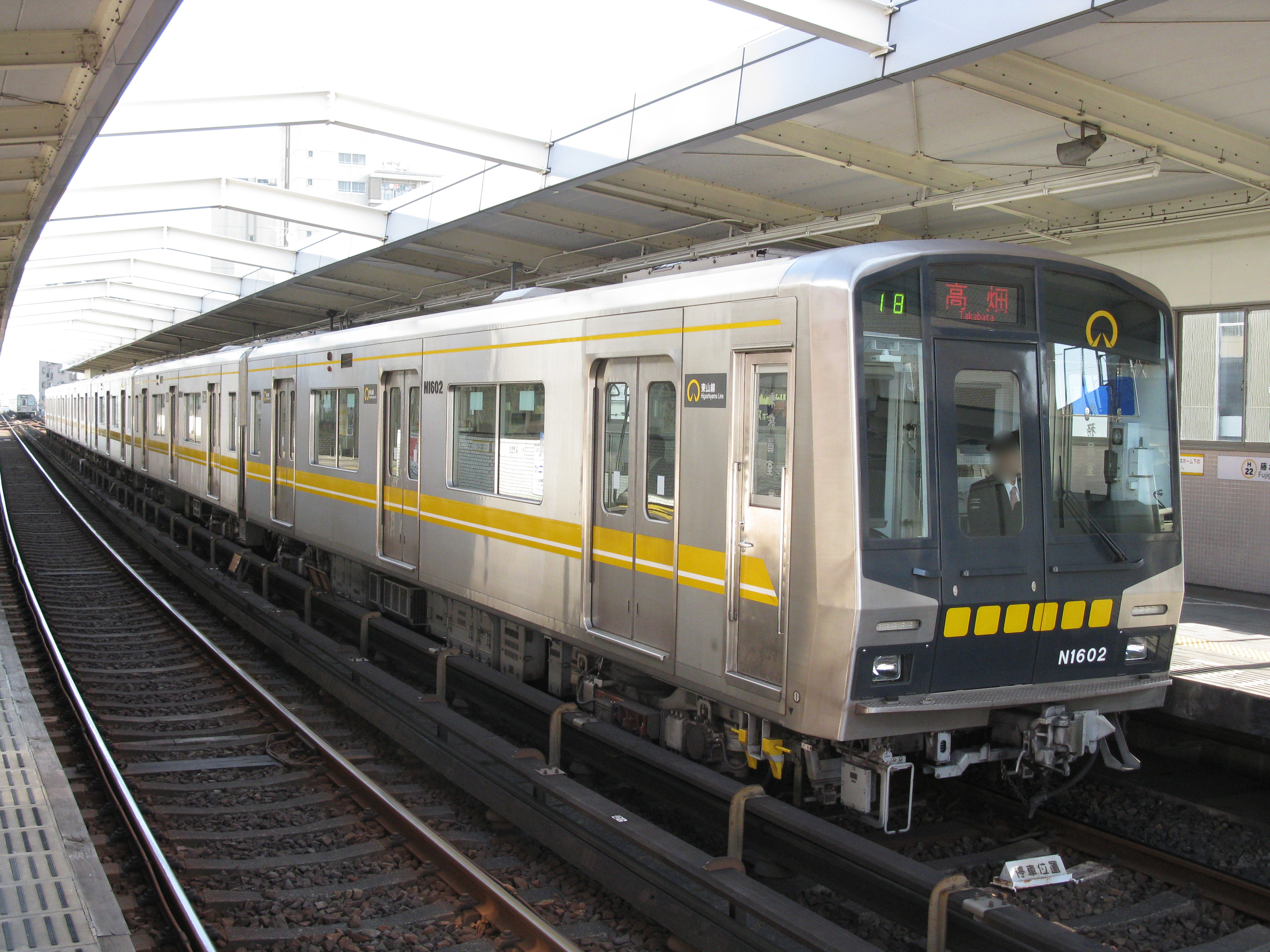
An N1000 series train in March 2010

=== Former ===
- 100/200/250/500/700 series (1957-1999)
- 300/800 series (1967-2000)
- 5000 series (July 1980 – August 2015)

The 250, 300 and 700 series trains were later sold to Takamatsu-Kotohira Electric Railroad, where they were refurbished and reclassified as Kotoden 600 series (former 250/700 series) and Kotoden 700 series (former 300 series), and to the Argentinian transport company Metrovías S.A., where they serve Line C of the Buenos Aires Metro.

The last remaining 5000 series train in service was withdrawn following a special final run on 30 August 2015.

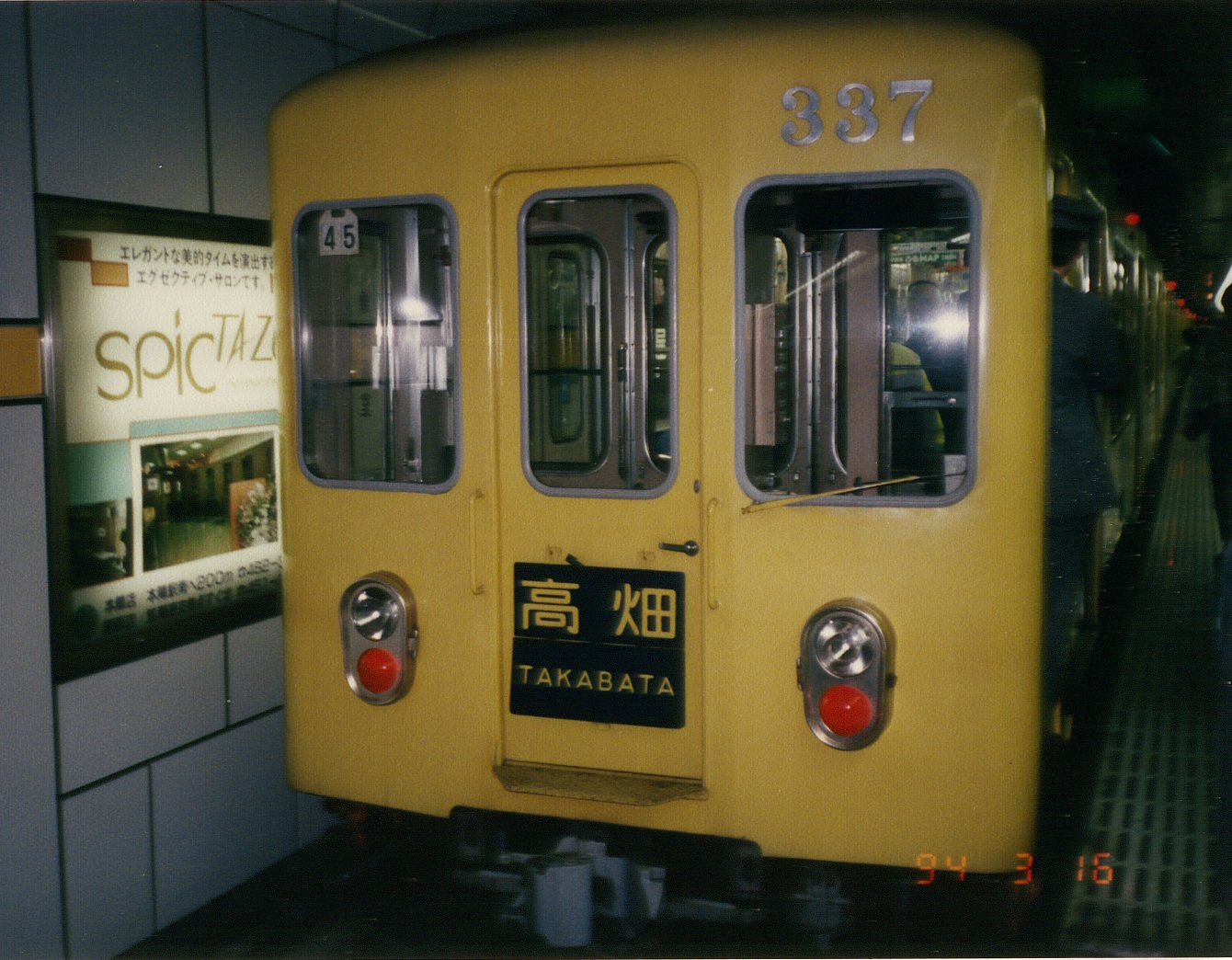
A Takabata-bound 300 series train in March 1994

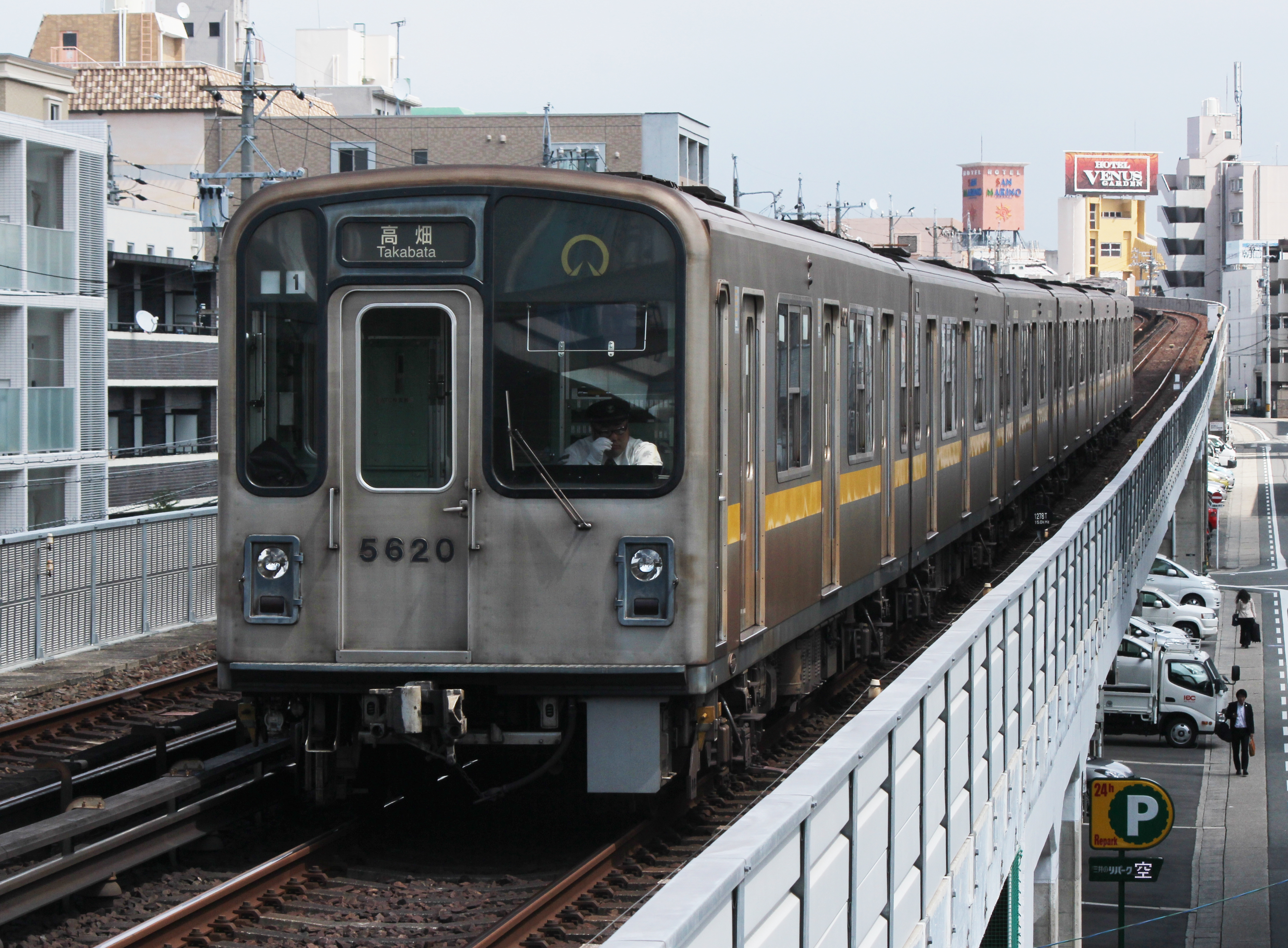
A 5000 series train in July 2015
