= Jasmine Bharucha =

Indian-Canadian singer and author

Jasmine Bharucha (also spelled Barucha) is an Indian-Canadian singer and author.

Bharucha grew up in Mumbai and in 1990 became the first performer from India to appear on MTV Asia. She released her debut album Alien Desire with Magnasound Records in 1991, along with a music video for the song "Alone Now". The video featured her in a "big brass bed with black satin sheets".

In 1992, Bharucha married and emigrated to Vancouver, Canada. She became a realtor and wrote Who Am I?, a children's book about mindfulness.
