= Madonna (Alisha Chinai album) =

Studio album by Alisha
- Released: 1989
- Studio: Old Court House Street, Calcutta
- Genre: Indipop
- Length: 34:10
- Label: Gramophone Company India
- Producer: Rajesh Jhaveri

Alisha chronology
Babydoll (1988)	Madonna (1989)	Kamasutra (1990)

Madonna is a 1989 Hindi-language platinum-selling pop album by Indipop star Alisha Chinai.

The album is mainly Hindi-language covers of songs by the American singer Madonna, and the cover shows Alisha wearing provocative clothes similar to Madonna's at the period. The album was promoted with a four city tour. The Indian press reported that the American singer had actually acknowledged Alisha's tribute, but a reaction came from Indian rapper Baba Sehgal who responded to Alisha's tour and album with a lampoon song "Madonna", where he also dressed as the American singer.

== Track listing ==
All lyrics are written by Shyam Anuragi; all music is composed by Rajesh Jhaveri

Side A
No.	Title	Original songwriter(s)	Length
1.	"Dheere Dheere" ("Material Girl")	Peter Brown; Robert Rans	4:02
2.	"Dekho Dekho" ("Like a Virgin")	Thomas Kelly; William Steinberg	3:25
3.	"Papa" ("Papa Don't Preach")	Brian Elliot; Madonna	3:48
4.	"Tere Bina" ("Live to Tell")	Madonna; Patrick Leonard	5:24
Total length:			16:39

Side B
No.	Title	Original songwriter(s)	Length
1.	"Pyaara Awaara" ("Dress You Up")	Andrea LaRusso; Peggy Stanziale	3:49
2.	"Aabhijaa" ("La Isla Bonita")	Madonna; Patrick Leonard	3:26
3.	"Todo Na Mera Dil" ("Borderline")	Reggie Lucas	4:16
4.	"Aake Chhoole" ("Lucky Star")	Madonna	5:31
Total length:			17:02

== Certification and Sales ==
Region	Certification	Certified units/sales
India (IMI)	Platinum	330,000
