= Nagoya Municipal Subway N1000 series =

Japanese train type

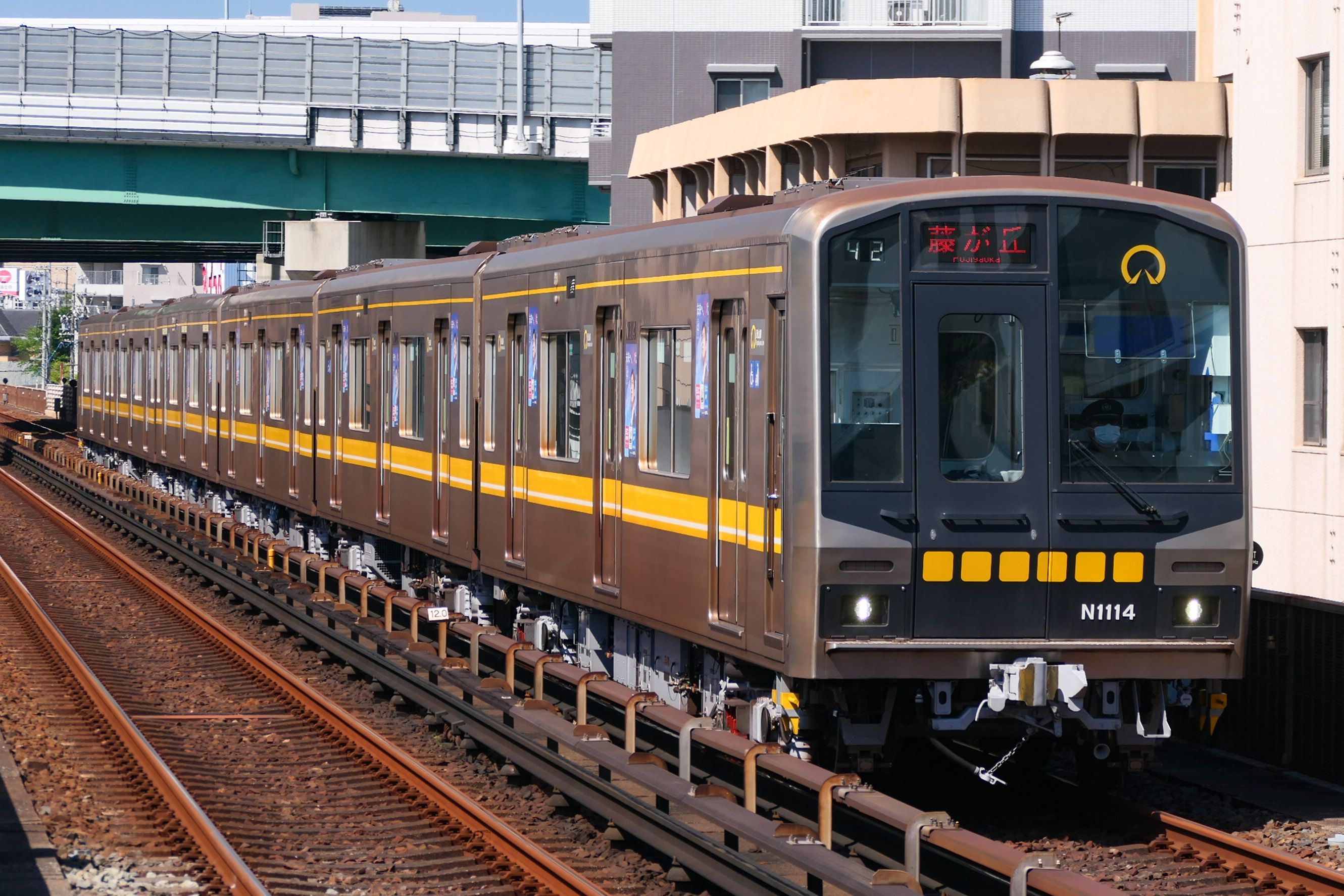
- Nagoya Municipal Subway N1000 series set N1114 in May 2025
- In service: 2008–present
- Manufacturer: Nippon Sharyo
- Replaced: 5000 series
- Constructed: 2007–2013
- Entered service: 26 March 2008
- Number built: 126 vehicles (21 sets)
- Number in service: 126 vehicles (21 sets) (As of 1 July 2015)
- Formation: 6 cars per trainset
- Fleet numbers: N1101 – N1121
- Capacity: 618
- Operators: Transportation Bureau City of Nagoya
- Depots: Fujigaoka
- Lines served: Higashiyama Line

Specifications
- Car body construction: Stainless steel
- Car length: 15,580 mm (51 ft 1 in)
- Width: 2,548 mm (8 ft 4.3 in)
- Height: 3,440 mm (11 ft 3 in)
- Floor height: 900 mm (2 ft 11 in)
- Doors: 3 pairs per side
- Maximum speed: 80 km/h (50 mph) (design); 65 km/h (40 mph) (service)
- Traction system: Mitsubishi Electric MAP-088-60V179 IGBT–VVVF
- Traction motors: 16 × 75 kW (101 hp) 3-phase AC induction motor
- Power output: 1.2 MW (1,609 hp)
- Acceleration: 0.92 m/s^{2} (2.1 mph/s)
- Deceleration: 1.1 m/s^{2} (2.5 mph/s) (service); 1.3 m/s^{2} (2.9 mph/s) (emergency)
- Electric system(s): 600 V DC third rail
- Current collector(s): Contact shoe
- UIC classification: 2′2′+Bo′Bo′+Bo′Bo′+Bo′Bo′+Bo′Bo′+2′2′
- Bogies: ND-740 (powered), ND-740T (trailer)
- Braking system(s): Electrical, regenerative and pneumatic
- Safety system(s): ATC
- Track gauge: 1,435 mm (4 ft 8 1/2 in) standard gauge

The Nagoya Municipal Subway N1000 series (名古屋市交通局N1000形) is a rapid transit electric multiple unit (EMU) train type operated by the Transportation Bureau City of Nagoya on the Nagoya Subway Higashiyama Line in Japan since 2008.

== Formation ==
As of 1 April 2015, the fleet consists of 20 six-car sets, formed as follows.

Car No.	1	2	3	4	5	6
Designation	Tc1	M1	M2	M2'	M1'	Tc2
Numbering	N1100	N1200	N1300	N1400	N1500	N1600
Weight (Metric tons)	21.5	25.0	23.8	23.8	25.0	21.5
Capacity Total/seated	97/31	106/37	106/37	106/37	106/37	97/31

One car is designated as a "women-only car" during the morning and evening peak periods on weekdays as a measure to reduce sexual assault during crowded times.

== Interior ==
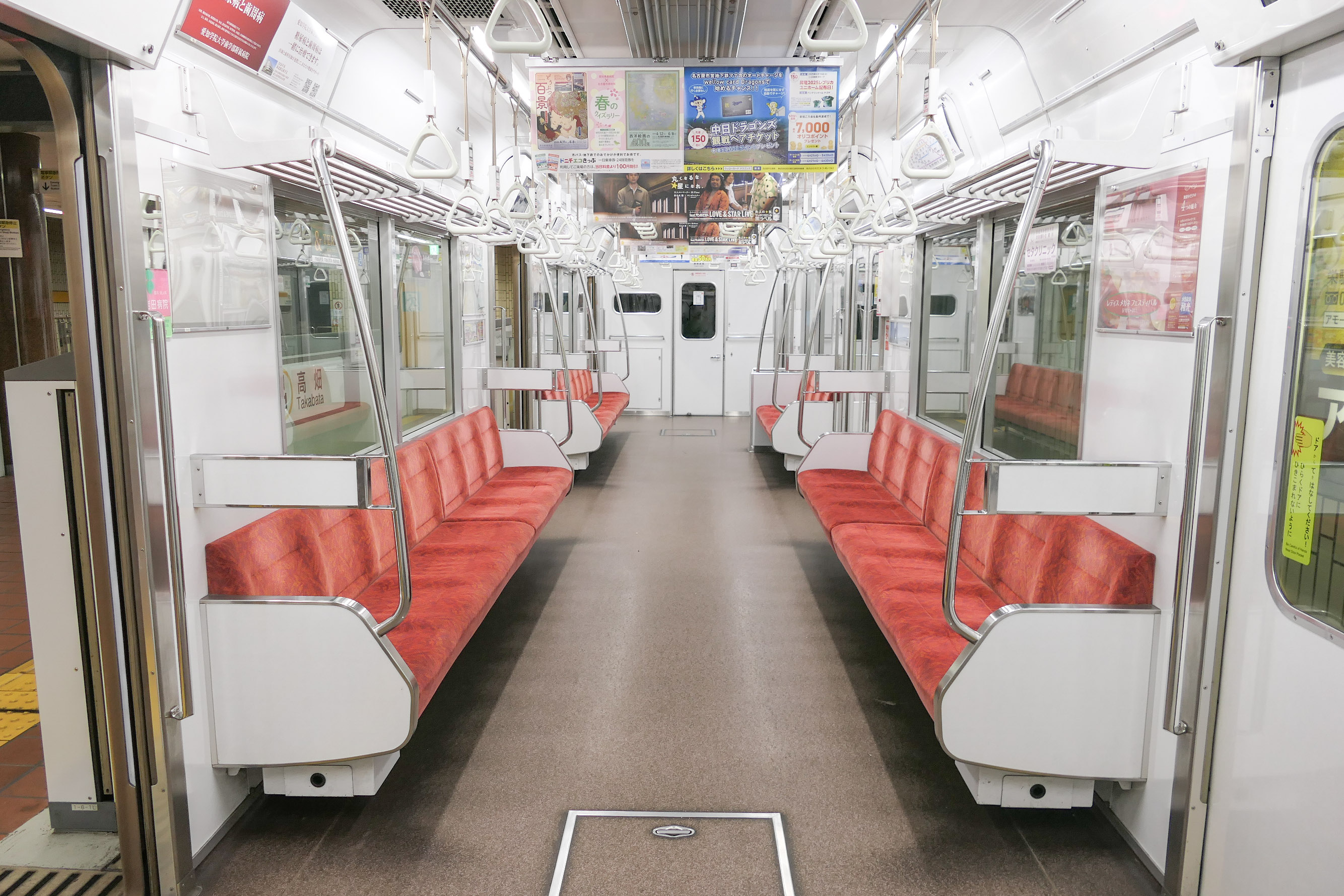
Interior

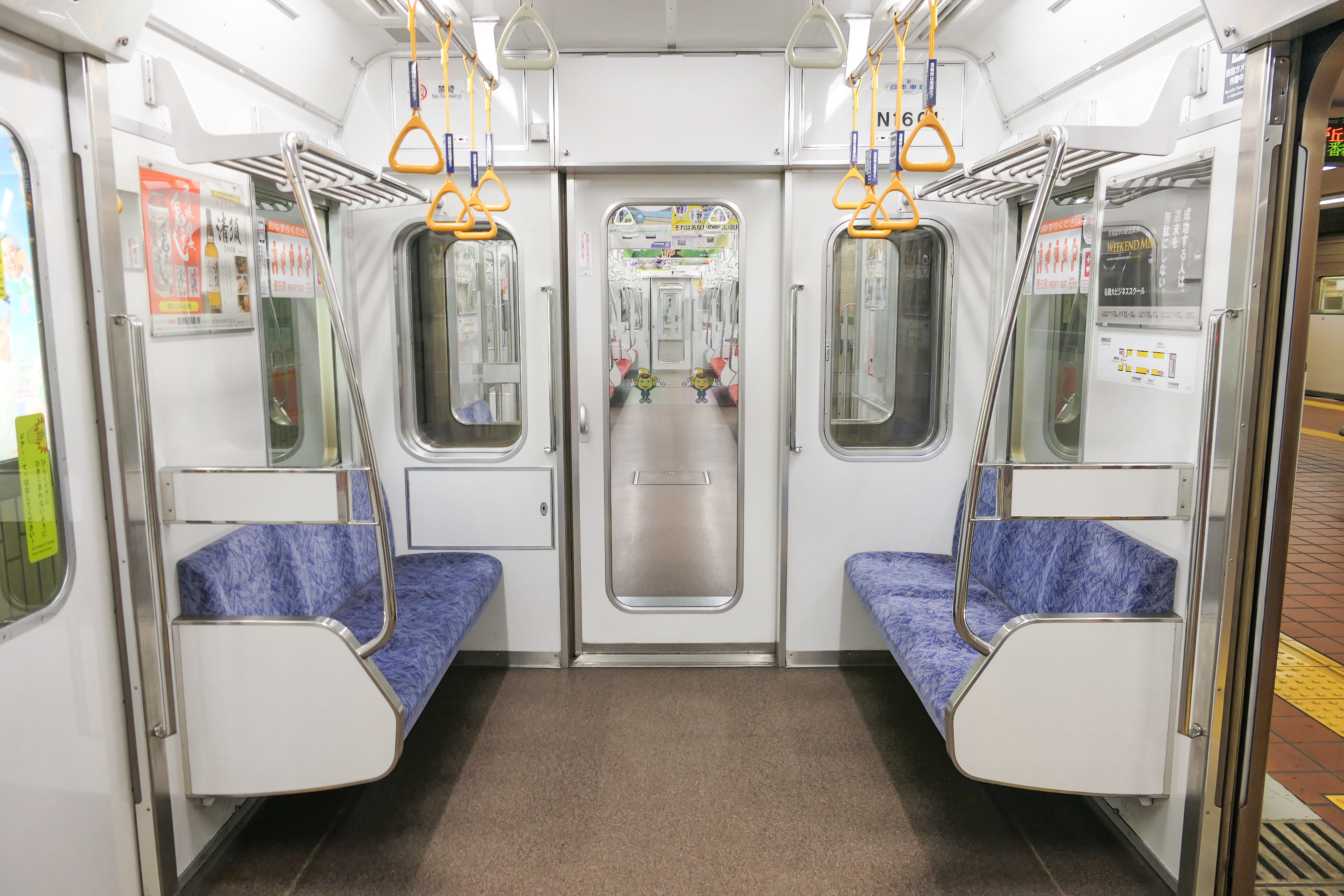
Priority seating

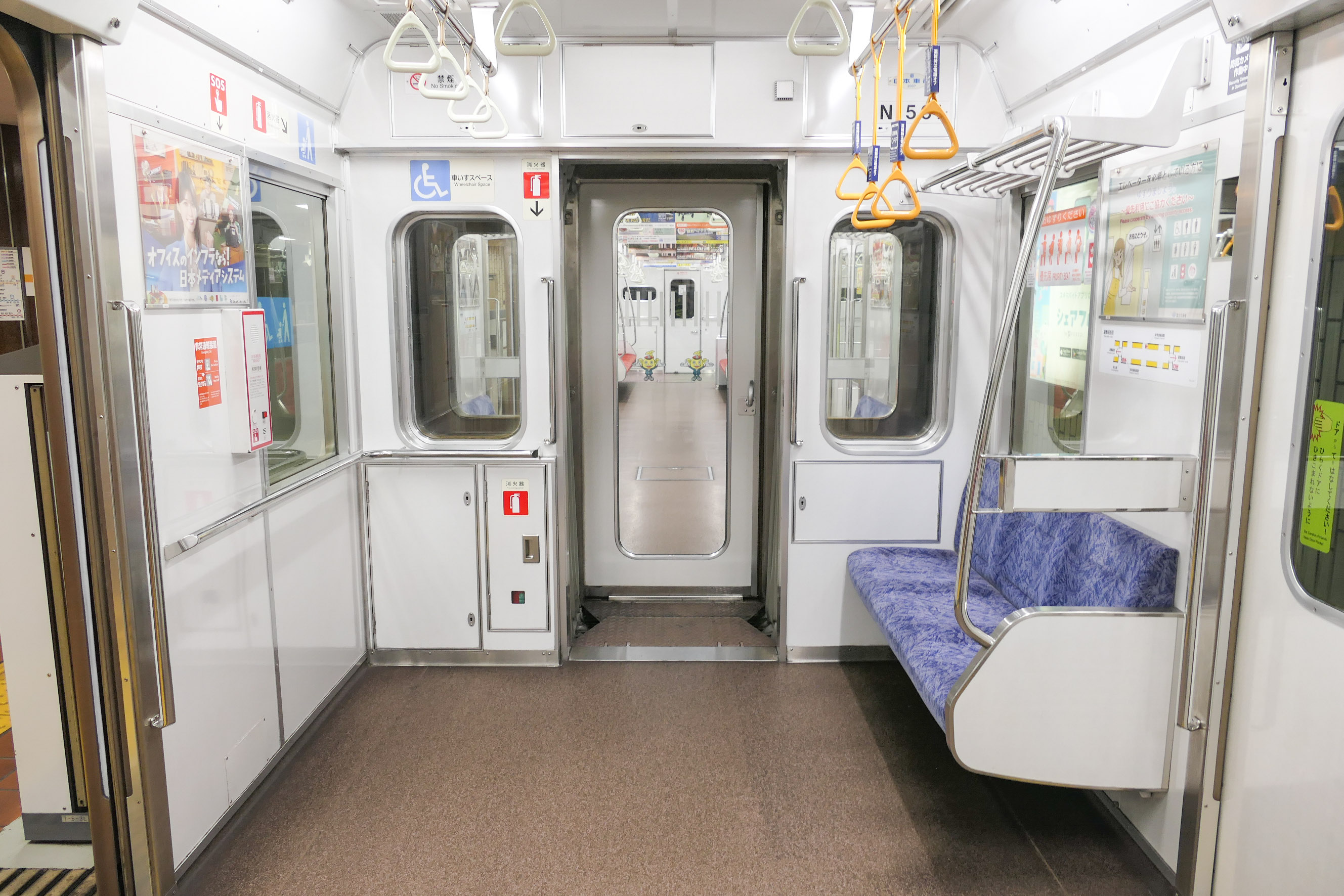
Priority seating with wheelchair space

== Build histories ==
The individual unit build details are as follows.

Set No.	Manufacturer	Delivery date
N1101	Nippon Sharyo	—
N1102	Nippon Sharyo	—
N1103	Nippon Sharyo	—
N1104	Nippon Sharyo	—
N1105	Nippon Sharyo	23 July 2012
N1106	Nippon Sharyo	3 August 2012
N1107	Nippon Sharyo	21 August 2012
N1108	Nippon Sharyo	7 September 2012
N1109	Nippon Sharyo	26 November 2012
N1110	Nippon Sharyo	12 December 2012
N1111	Nippon Sharyo	22 May 2013
N1112	Nippon Sharyo	18 June 2013
N1113	Nippon Sharyo	4 July 2013
N1114	Nippon Sharyo	7 October 2013
N1115	Nippon Sharyo	29 October 2013
N1116	Nippon Sharyo	26 June 2014
N1117	Nippon Sharyo	17 July 2014
N1118	Nippon Sharyo	29 July 2014
N1119	Nippon Sharyo	17 February 2015
N1120	Nippon Sharyo	4 March 2015
N1121	Nippon Sharyo	23 April 2015
