= 50/50 burger =

Hamburger patty

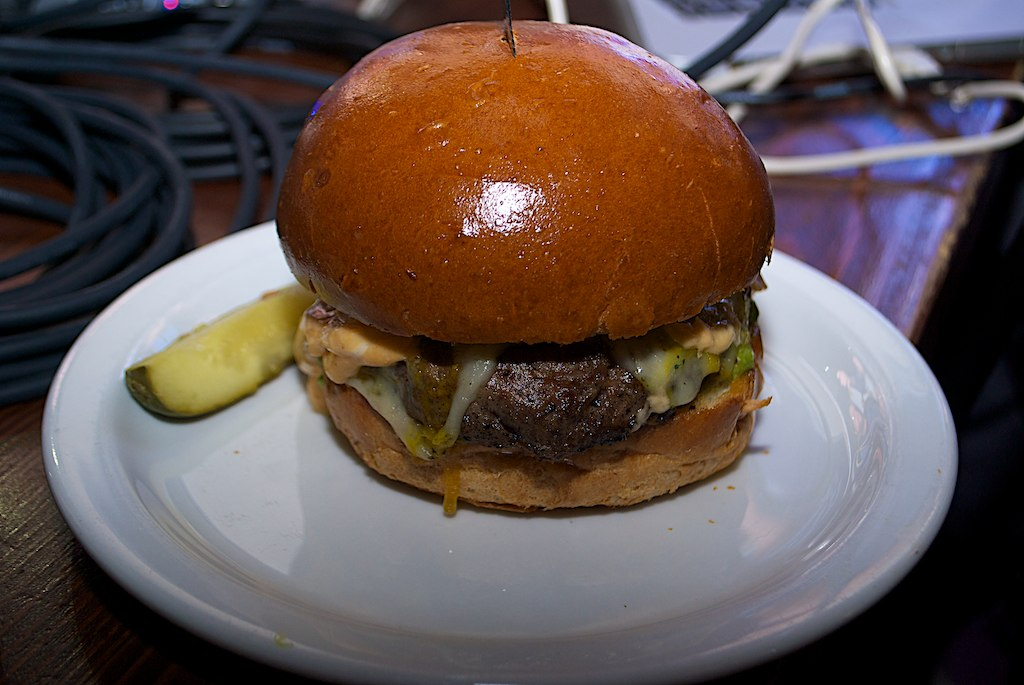
- Slaters 50-50 burger
- Type: Burger
- Course: Main
- Place of origin: United States
- Region or state: Southern California
- Created by: Scott Slater
- Main ingredients: Bacon, beef
- Ingredients generally used: egg, avocado, cheese, mayonnaise, bun

The 50/50 Burger patty is a half ground bacon, half ground beef burger patty developed by Scott Slater for Slater's 50/50 restaurant. The 50/50 Burger consists of a 50% ground bacon and 50% ground beef patty topped with a sunny side up egg, avocado mash, pepper jack cheese and chipotle adobo mayo on a hamburger bun.

Slater's 50/50 restaurant has also created a kangaroo burger that is composed of half kangaroo meat and half bacon.

== Slater’s 50/50 restaurants ==
As of April 2018, there are nine Slater's 50/50 restaurants, seven are located in Southern California, one in Dallas and one in Las Vegas.

== See also ==
- List of hamburgers
