= Alisha Chinai =

Indian singer (born 1965)

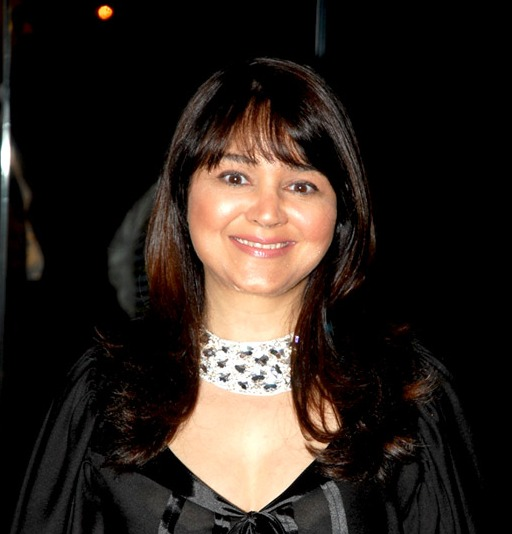
- Chinai in 2009

Background information
- Born: 18 March 1965 (age 61); Ahmedabad, Gujarat, India
- Genres: Indipop; playback singing
- Occupation: Singer
- Years active: 1985–present

Alisha Chinai (born 18 March 1965) is an Indian pop singer known for her Indi-pop albums as well as playback singing in Hindi cinema. She began her singing career with the album Jadoo in 1985, and by the 1990s she had become known as the 'Queen of Indipop'. Her best known songs were collaborations with producers Anu Malik and Biddu during the 1990s. She is best known as a solo artist for her song "Made in India", from her 1995 eponymous studio album.

== Career ==
Chinai's initial albums included Jaadoo, Babydoll, Aah... Alisha!, Madonna, Kamasutra, Alisha - Madonna of India and Made in India. Alisha was introduced to Hindi film music by the veteran music director and composer Bappi Lahiri. They had many disco hits together in many films in the 1980s including Adventures of Tarzan, Dance Dance, Commando, Guru, Love Love Love, etc. When she started her career with him, she was playback singing for many leading actresses, such as Karisma Kapoor, Smita Patil, Mandakini, Sridevi, Juhi Chawla, Madhuri Dixit, Divya Bharti. In 1985, Alisha sang two songs with Remo Fernandes, in Konkani, for the album Old Goan Gold. She also recorded a song for Pankuj Parashar's film Jalwa (1987), composed by Anand–Milind. One of her biggest hits during the 1980s was "Kaate Nahin Katthe" from Mr. India, which she recorded in 1987 with Kishore Kumar under the music direction of Laxmikant–Pyarelal. Another successful track, in 1989, was "Raat Bhar Jaam Se" from the film Tridev, which had music by Kalyanji-Anandji and Viju Shah.

In the 1990s, Chinai took on working in different films, collaborating with other music directors, such as Anu Malik, Anand–Milind, Rajesh Roshan and Nadeem-Shravan. Throughout these years, she had several Bollywood hit songs, including "Dhak Dhak Dhak" with Aditya Pancholi from Maha-Sangram, "Jalta Hai Badan" from Balwaan, "Tere Ishq Mein Nachenge"from Raja Hindustani, "Chaa Raha Hain Pyaar Ka Nasha" from Chandra Mukhi, "Roundhe" from Pyar Tune Kya Kiya, "Sona Sona Roop Hai" from Bollywood/Hollywood, "Mouje Mein" from Karobaar, "De Diya" from Keemat, "Ruk Ruk Ruk" from Vijaypath and the controversial "Sexy Sexy Sexy Mujhe Log Bole" from Khuddar.

Chinai recorded an album with Lesle Lewis, titled Bombay Girl, which included the hit song "De De" released in 1994. Simultaneously, she recorded many songs as a pop singer, with accompanying album releases. Chinai was noted for her 1995 hit single and eponymous studio album, titled Made in India, which was composed by Biddu and went on to become one of the highest-selling pop albums of its time, making Alisha became a household name. It contains well-known songs such as "Aaja Mere Dil Mein", "Ek Baar Do Baar", "Sun O Meri Dhadkan", "Tu Kahan", "Ooh La La", "Tu Jo Mila", "Dhokha Diya Hai Re Tune Mere Dil" and "Lover Girl". With its success, Chinai announced her departure from playback singing and wanted to concentrate only on private pop albums. However, her follow-up releases were less successful. This was also the period when she got embroiled into a major controversy with the man who recorded several hit songs with her, Anu Malik. During the release of Made in India, Chinai had accused Anu Malik of molesting her. Anu Malik and Chinai did not work for several years, only to reunite in 2003 with Ishq Vishk.

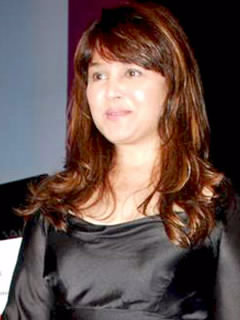
Chinai in 2010

Chinai's comeback to film music was with the song "Oh My Darling" in the Yash Raj film Mujhse Dosti Karoge!. From 2000 to 2009, she recorded primarily with Himesh Reshammiya, Shankar–Ehsaan–Loy and Pritam. After her controversy with Anu Malik in the 1990s, she patched up with him to record for a number of films, starting with Ishq Vishk, Fida, No Entry, Love Story 2050, Maan Gaye Mughle Azam, Ugly Aur Pagli, Chehraa and Kambakht Ishq.

In 2005, Chinai's career reached a new high when she sang "Kajra Re" from Bunty Aur Babli. The song was a hit and won her a Filmfare Award for Best Female Playback Singer. She was also a judge on Indian Idol 3 and is a judge on Zee TV's Star Ya Rockstar with Anu Malik.

In 2021, Alisha Chinai appeared on Jay-Ho! The Jay Kumar Show, where she talked about her childhood. She shared that her love for music began early, with school performances and her mother's influence, as her mom enjoyed Western pop music. Alisha also mentioned how she challenged the stereotype that Indian girls couldn't sing pop music with her own work.

== Awards ==
- Chinai received the Filmfare Best Female Playback Award for the song "Kajra Re", from Bunty Aur Babli (2005).
- Previously, she received the International Billboard Award in 1995, around the time Made in India came out, and also won the Freddie Mercury Award for Artistic Excellence.

Following are the list of awards and nominations in different categories.

| Year | Category | Song | Result |
|---|---|---|---|
Screen Awards
| 1995 | Best Indian Pop Album | "Made in India" | Won |
| 1995 | Best Music Video | "Made in India" | Won |

== Personal life ==
Chinai is a Gujarati. She was married to her manager Rajesh Jhaveri and is now separated. Chinai has been in a relationship with Furkat Azamov, a native of Tajikistan, since 2020.

== Discography ==
=== Studio albums ===
| Year | Album | Record label |
|---|---|---|
| 1985 | Jadoo | His Master's Voice |
| 1986 | Aah... Alisha! | His Master's Voice |
| 1988 | Babydoll | His Master's Voice |
| 1989 | Madonna | His Master's Voice |
| 1990 | Kamasutra | His Master's Voice |
| 1992 | Alisha - Madonna of India | His Master's Voice |
| 1994 | Bombay Girl | Magnasound |
| 1995 | Made in India | Magnasound |
| 1998 | Om | His Master's Voice |
| 1999 | Dil Ki Rani | Virgin Records |
| 2001 | Alisha | Tips |

=== Compilation albums ===
| Year | Album | Record label |
|---|---|---|
| 1993 | Best of Alisha Live | Unknown |
| 1993 | Alisha Greatest Hits | Unknown |
| 1995 | Born with a Wild Heart | Unknown |
| 1996 | Channel Hits | Magnasound |
| 1997 | Alisha Unleashed | His Master's Voice |
| 1997 | Party Zone | Magnasound |
| 1998 | The Ultimate Party Album | Magnasound |
| 1998 | The Best of Alisha | Magnasound |
| 1999 | Now That's What I Call Indipop | Sony Music |
| 2001 | Alisha: Singer Doll of India | Unknown |
| 2002 | Hitz Unlimited | Zee Records |
| 2007 | Shut Up N Kiss Me | Tips |

=== Soundtrack albums ===
The following are sales of Bollywood soundtrack albums featuring songs by Alisha Chinai.

| Album | Year | Sales | Ref |
|---|---|---|---|
| 1991 | Phool Aur Kaante | 6,000,000 | |
| 1992 | Khiladi | 2,500,000 | |
| 1995 | Haathkadi | 1,000,000 | |
| 1994 | Main Khiladi Tu Anari | 3,000,000 | |
| 1994 | Khuddar | 2,800,000 | |
| 1997 | Aflatoon | 2,500,000 | |
| 2002 | Mujhse Dosti Karoge | 1,200,000 | |
| 2003 | Ishq Vishk | 1,200,000 | |
| 2004 | Murder | 2,200,000 | |
| 2004 | Fida | 1,400,000 | |
| 2005 | Bunty Aur Babli | 1,900,000 | |
| 2006 | Dhoom 2 | 2,000,000 | |
| 2006 | Don: The Chase Begins Again | 1,500,000 | |
| 2007 | Jhoom Barabar Jhoom | 1,700,000 | |
| 2007 | Namastey London | 1,400,000 | |
| | Total sales | 30,800,000 | |

=== Other albums ===
| Year | Album | Language | Record label |
|---|---|---|---|
| 2001 | Santiago Fiesta Latina: Bollywood Goes Latino (As a singer) | Hindi | EMI Virgin Records |
| 2002 | Bandhoi (As a backing vocals) | Assamese | Raj Music |
| 2009 | Caminho das Índias (As a singer) | Portuguese | Som Livre |

=== Select hit songs ===
- "Made in India" (Made in India, 1995)
- "Dil Ye Kehta Hai (I Love You)"(Phool Aur Kaante, 1991)
- "Jumbalakka" (Thakshak, 1999)
- "Panch Vorsam" (Konkani, Old Goan Gold, 1985)
- "Rajan Ani Prema" (Konkani, Old Goan Gold, 1985)
- "Dil Mera Todo Na" (Dance Dance)
- "Zooby Zooby" (Dance Dance)
- "Let's Do It" (Jalwa)
- "Kaate Nahin" (Mr. India)
- "Raat Bhare Jaam se" (Tridev)
- "Dhak Dhak" (Maha-Sangram)
- "Cha Raha Hain" (Chandra Mukhi)
- "Sexy Sexy" (Khuddar)
- "Tu Shama Main Parwana Tera" (Khiladi)
- "Ruk Ruk Ruk" (Vijaypath)
- "Bambai Se Rail Chali" (Zaalim)
- "My Adorable Darling" (Main Khiladi Tu Anari)
- "Ure Baba" (Bambai Ka Babu)
- "Tere Ishq Main Nachenge" (Raja Hindustani)
- "Krishna Krishna" (Insaaf)
- "De Diya Dil Piya" (Keemat)
- "Tinka, Tinka" (Karam)
- "Pyaar Aaya" (Plan)
- "Mehboob Mere" (Plan)
- "Oh My Darling!" (Mujhse Dosti Karoge, 2002)
- "Rang Rang Mere Rang Rang Mein" (Bollywood/Hollywood, 2002)
- "Chot Dil Pe Lagi" (Ishq Vishk, 2003)
- "Dil Ko Hazar Bar" (Murder, 2004)
- "Maine Jisko Chaha Mil Gaya" (Fida, 2004)
- "Hamnasheen" (Dobara, 2004)
- "Kajra Re" (Bunty Aur Babli, 2005)
- "Ishq Di Gali" (No Entry, 2005)
- "Dil Chura ke Mere" (No Entry, 2005)
- "Yeh Ishq Mein" (No Entry, 2005)
- "Abhi toh mein" (The Killer, 2006)
- "Aaj Ki Raat" (Don, 2006)
- "Touch Me" (Dhoom 2, 2006)
- "It's Rocking" (Kya Love Story Hai, 2007)
- "Ticket To Hollywood" (Jhoom Barabar Jhoom, 2007)
- "Lover Boy" (Love Story 2050, 2008)
- "Bebo" (Kambakkht Ishq, 2009)
- "Tera Hone Laga Hoon" (Ajab Prem Ki Ghazab Kahani, 2009)
- "Jiyara Jiyara" (Prince, 2010)
- "Dilruba" (Namastey London, 2007)
- "Dil Tu Hi Bataa" (Krrish 3, 2013)
- "You Are My Love" (Krrish 3, 2013)
- "Gori chori cori" (Aflatoon, 1997)
- "Jalta Hai Kyun Tan Badan" (Bandh Darwaza, 1991)
