= Nagoya Municipal Subway 5050 series =

Japanese train type

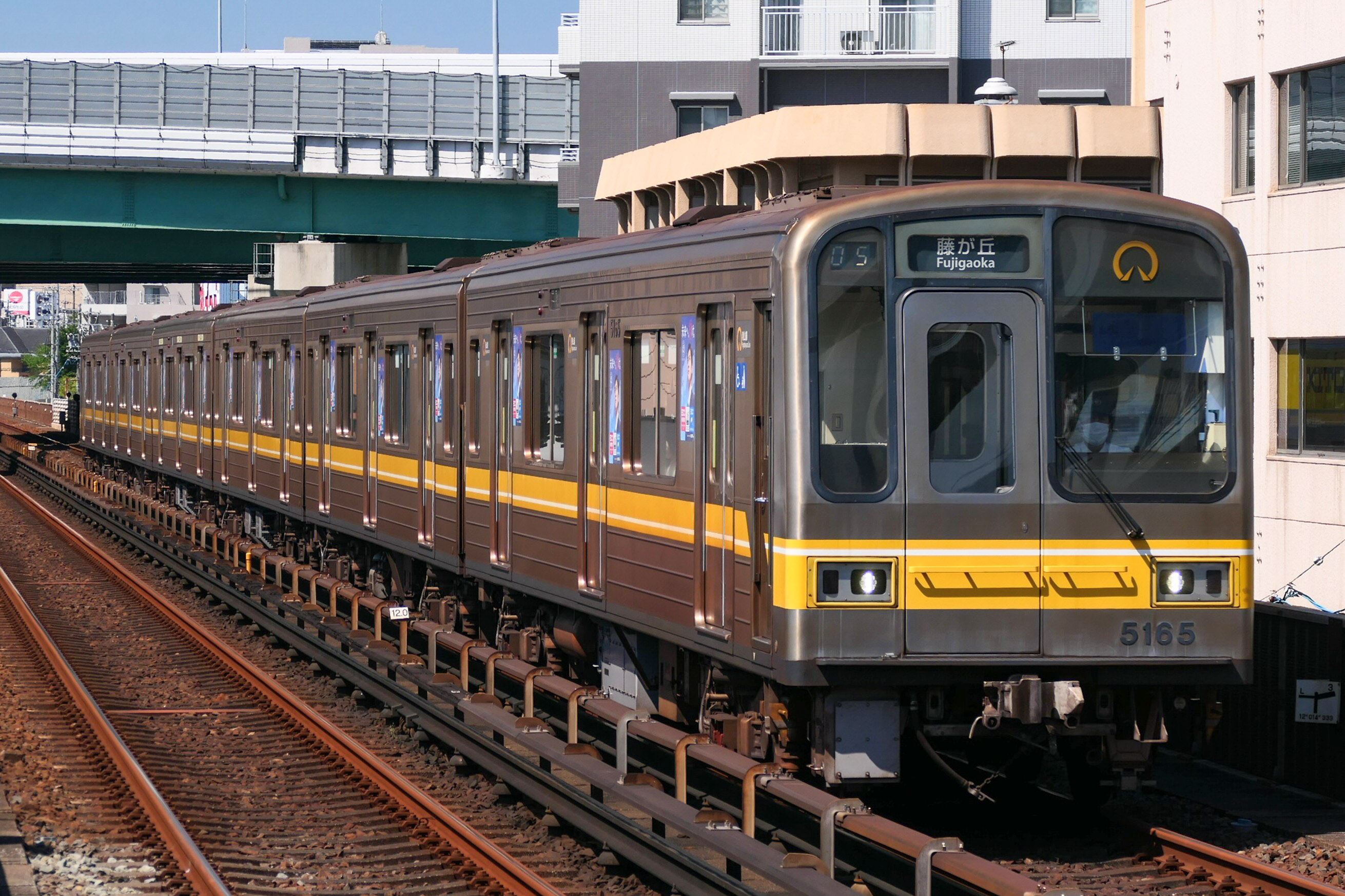
- 5050 series set 5165 in May 2025
- In service: 1992–present
- Manufacturer: Nippon Sharyo
- Constructed: 1992–2000
- Entered service: 1992
- Number built: 162 vehicles (27 sets)
- Number in service: 162 vehicles (27 sets)
- Formation: 6 cars per trainset
- Capacity: 680
- Operators: Transportation Bureau City of Nagoya
- Lines served: Higashiyama Line

Specifications
- Car body construction: Stainless steel
- Car length: 15,580 mm (51 ft 1 in)
- Width: 2,546 mm (8 ft 4.2 in)
- Height: 3,440 mm (11 ft 3 in)
- Floor height: 960 mm (3 ft 2 in)
- Doors: 3 pairs per side
- Maximum speed: 65 km/h (40 mph)
- Acceleration: 3.3 km/(h⋅s) (2.1 mph/s)
- Electric system(s): 600 V DC third rail
- Current collection: Contact shoe
- Braking system(s): Electronically controlled pneumatic brakes with regenerative braking
- Safety system(s): ATC, Train stop (Obsolete)
- Track gauge: 1,435 mm (4 ft 8 1/2 in)

The Nagoya Municipal Subway 5050 series (名古屋市交通局5050形) is a rapid transit electric multiple unit (EMU) train type operated by the Transportation Bureau City of Nagoya on the Nagoya Subway Higashiyama Line in Japan since 1992.

== Specifications ==
Like other modern cars on the Nagoya Subway lines, the 5050 series uses a variable-frequency drive controller to convert DC current to AC current to power a squirrel cage motor.

== Formation ==
As of 1 April 2014, the fleet consists of 27 six-car sets, formed as follows.

(Left is toward Fujigaoka Station and right is toward Takabata Station)

Car No.	1	2	3	4	5	6
Designation	Tc1	M2	M1	M1'	M2'	Tc2
Numbering	5150	5250	5350	5450	5550	5650
Weight (t)	21.4	25.2	25.2	25.2	25.2	21.4
Capacity Total/seated	96/32	107/40	107/40	107/40	107/40	96/32

One car is designated as a "women-only car" during the morning and evening peak periods on weekdays as a measure to reduce sexual assault during crowded times.

== Special liveries ==
Beginning on 1 August 2022, set 5177 was wrapped in a yellow livery for the "Yellow Den Memorial" campaign to mark 100th anniversary of the Nagoya Municipal Subway. The campaign ran until January 2023.
