= Nagoya Municipal Subway 5000 series =

Japanese train type, 1980–2015

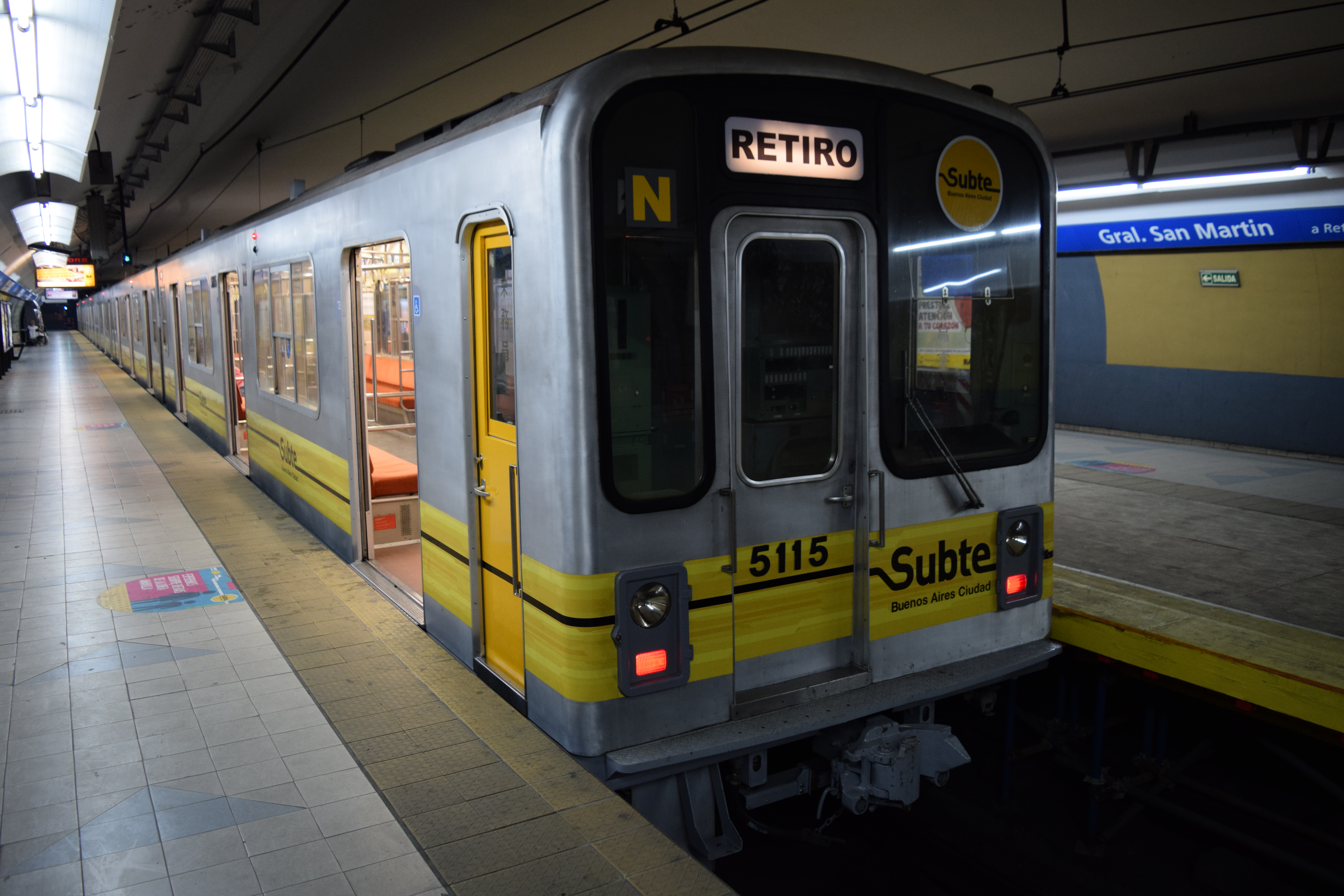
- Nagoya 5000 Conjunto 5115 En General San Martin

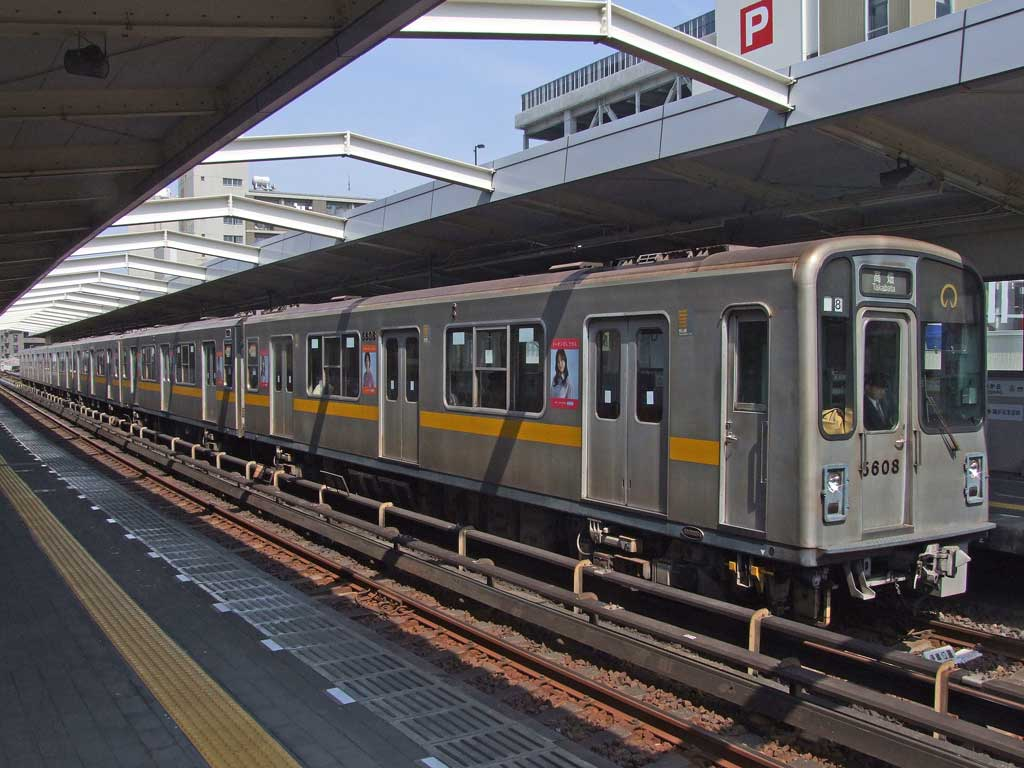
- In service: 1 July 1980–30 August 2015 (Nagoya Subway); 2015–present (Buenos Aires Underground)
- Constructed: 1980–1990
- Refurbished: 2015 (30 vehicles)
- Scrapped: 2003–2015
- Number built: 138 vehicles (23 sets)
- Number in service: 30 vehicles (5 sets)
- Number scrapped: 108 vehicles (18 sets)
- Formation: 6 cars per trainset
- Capacity: 680
- Operators: Transportation Bureau City of Nagoya (1980–2015); Buenos Aires Underground (2015–present)
- Lines served: Higashiyama Line (1980–2015); Línea (2015–present)

Specifications
- Car body construction: Aluminum alloy
- Car length: 15.58 m (51 ft 1 3/8 in)
- Width: 2,508 mm (8 ft 2 3/4 in)
- Height: 3.44 m (11 ft 3 3/8 in)
- Floor height: 960 mm (37 3/4 in)
- Doors: 3 pairs per side
- Maximum speed: 65 km/h (40 mph)
- Traction system: Thyristor Chopper
- Acceleration: 0.92 m/s^{2} (2.1 mph/s)
- Electric systems: 600 V DC third rail 1,500 V DC overhead catenary (Buenos Aires)
- Current collection: Contact shoe Pantograph (Buenos Aires)
- Braking system: Brake-by-wire hydraulic regenerative brakes
- Safety system: ATC
- Track gauge: 1,435 mm (4 ft 8 1/2 in) standard gauge

The Nagoya Municipal Subway 5000 series (名古屋市交通局5000形) is a rapid transit electric multiple unit (EMU) train type formerly operated by the Nagoya City Transportation Bureau on the Nagoya Subway Higashiyama Line in Japan from July 1980 until August 2015. Following their withdrawal in Japan, five sets were shipped to Argentina in 2015 for use on Line C of the Buenos Aires Underground.

== Formation ==
The trains were formed as six-car sets, as follows.

Car No.	1	2	3	4	5	6
Designation	Tc1	M2	M1	M1'	M2'	Tc2
Numbering	5100	5200	5300	5400	5500	5600
Weight (t)	22.0	24.2				22.0
Capacity (Total/seated)	110/38	115/44				110/38

One car was designated as a "women-only car" during the morning and evening peak periods on weekdays as a measure to reduce sexual assault during crowded times.

== History ==
The first trains entered service on 1 July 1980. These were the first air-conditioned trains to be used on the Higashiyama Line. A total of 23 sets were built between 1980 and 1990.

=== Withdrawal and resale ===
The last remaining 5000 series train in service, set 5114, was withdrawn from the Higashiyama Line following a special final run on 30 August 2015.

In 2015, five 5000 series units (30 vehicles) were shipped to Argentina to be used on Line C of the Buenos Aires Underground. These sets were modified with pantographs to operate from a 1,500 V overhead supply instead of the original 600 V third rail.

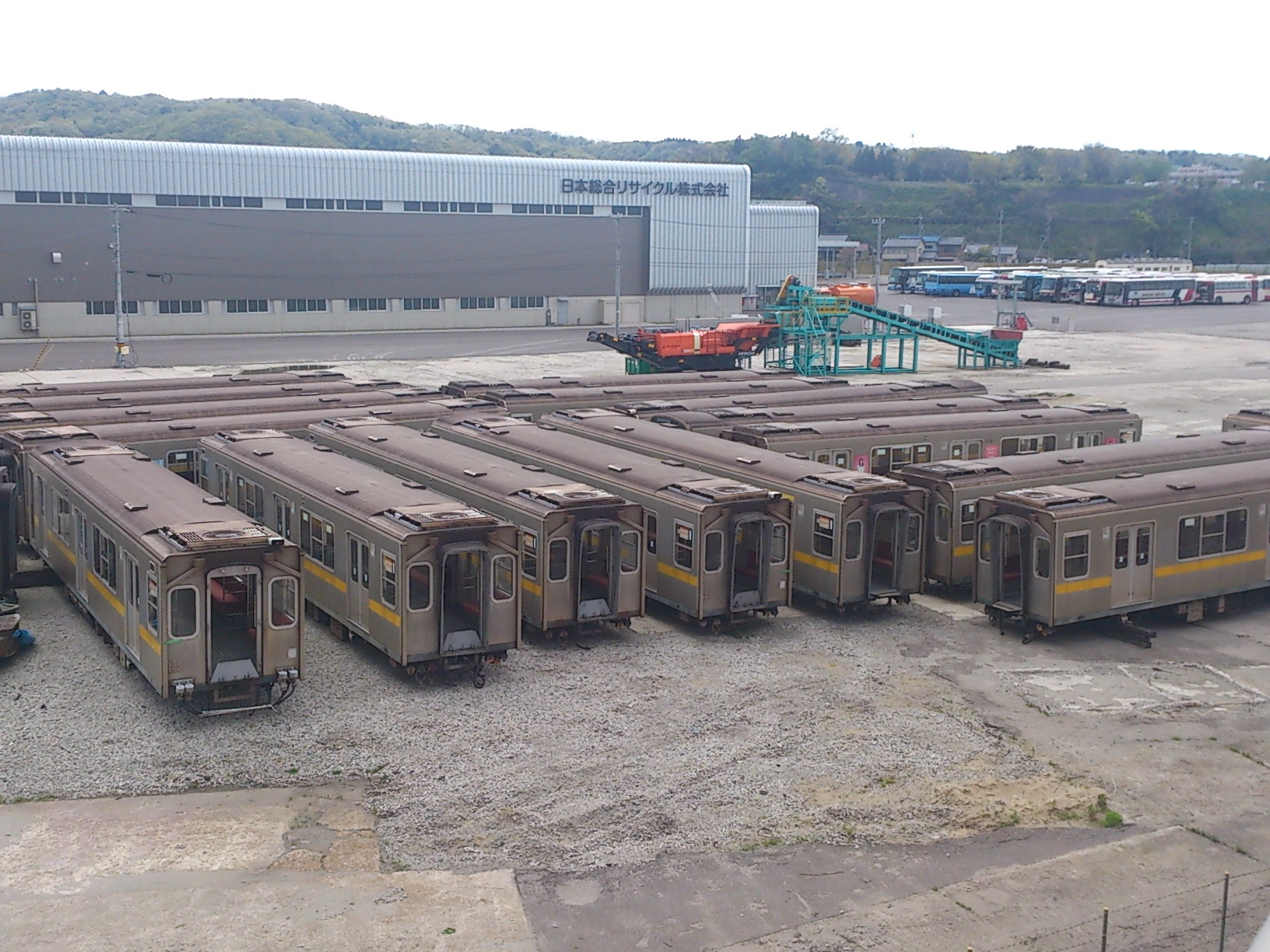
Withdrawn 5000 series cars at the Nihon Sougou Recycle plant in Takaoka, Toyama, awaiting scrapping in May 2013

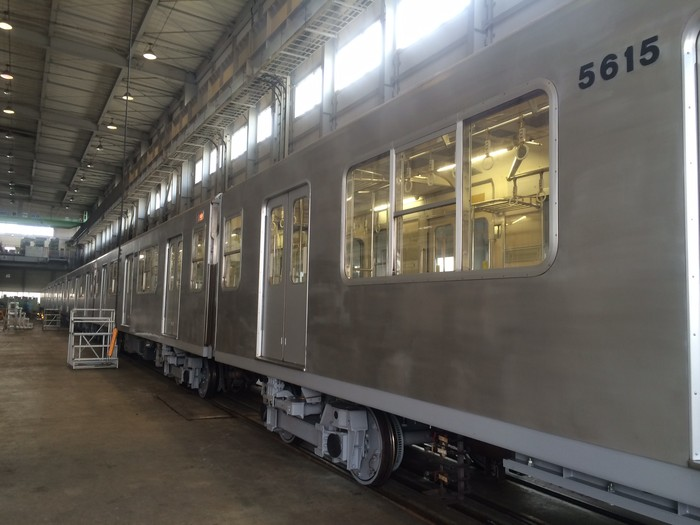
Withdrawn 5000 series cars at the Osaka Sharyo plant in August 2014 undergoing modifications ahead of shipment to Argentina

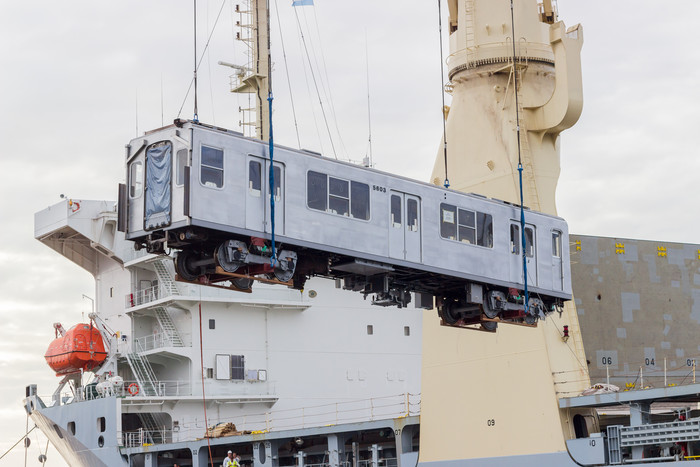
A former 5000 series car being unloaded in Argentina in February 2015

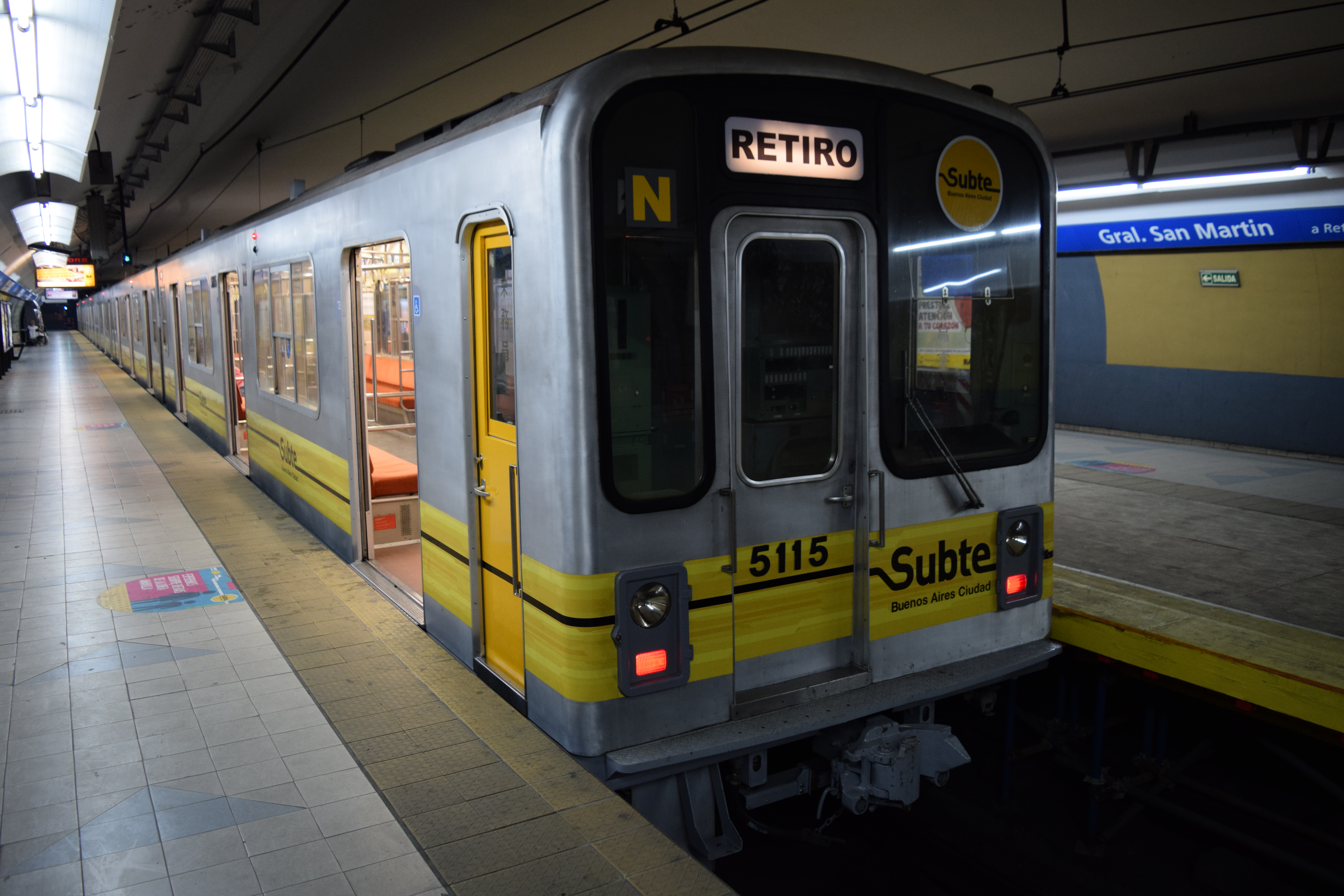
Train 5115 on Line C of the Buenos Aires Underground
