= 50/50 (soft drink) =

American grapefruit-lime soft drink

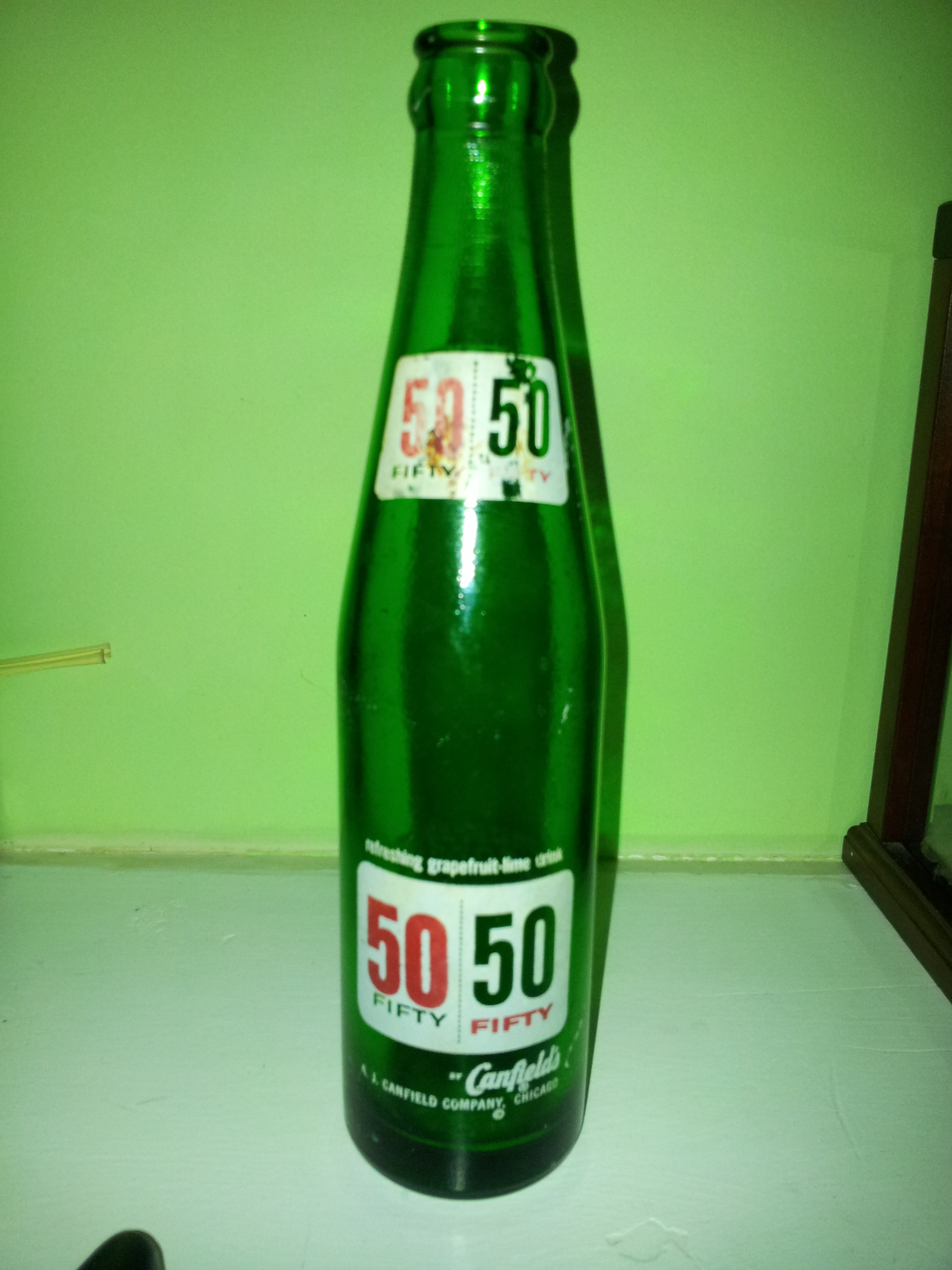
- Empty 50/50 pop bottle
- Type: Soft drink
- Manufacturer: Keurig Dr Pepper
- Distributor: Keurig Dr Pepper
- Origin: United States
- Introduced: 1870s
- Discontinued: 2020s
- Color: Green
- Flavor: Grapefruit and lime
- Variants: Diet 50/50

50/50 (also known as Canfield's 50/50 and Graf's 50/50) was a grapefruit- and lime-flavored soft drink produced in the United States. 50/50 was primarily sold in the Midwest, including southern Wisconsin and the Chicagoland area. It was one of the Canfield company's more popular soft drink flavors.

In the 1870s, John Graf of Milwaukee, Wisconsin, brewed a number of soft drinks, including Grandpa Graf's root beer and 50/50. Soft drinks became the Graf family business. In 1968, his descendant Lawrie O. Graf sold the business to P & V Atlas, who sold it to Canada Dry, who sold it to the A.J. Canfield Company of Chicago, Illinois. The A.J. Canfield company produced and distributed the drink for nearly three decades. In 1995, Select Beverages, a drink company based in Darien, Illinois, acquired A.J. Canfield, taking over the production of 50/50. Select Beverages was itself acquired by Cadbury Schweppes and The Carlyle Group in 1998. In 2008, Cadbury Schweppes split into Cadbury and the Dr Pepper Snapple Group, the latter of which continued to produce 50/50. Dr Pepper Snapple Group was itself acquired by Keurig Green Mountain in 2018, becoming Keurig Dr Pepper.

50/50 became increasingly difficult to find in the years leading up to the COVID-19 pandemic. By early 2024, consumers could no longer find 50/50 on grocery store shelves, leading fans of the drink to believe that it had been quietly discontinued. 50/50 is no longer included on the list of brands owned by Keurig Dr Pepper as of May 2024.
