= Shaan discography =

Indian musician

Shaan is an Indian singer, music director, composer and lyricist. He primarily works for and sings in the Assamese, Bengali and Hindi-language film and music industries.

== As a composer ==
Year	Album	Song	Singer(s)	Ref.
2000	Tanha Dil	"Gum Sum Ho Kyun"	Shaan	
2000	Tanha Dil	"Bhool Ja"	Shaan	
2000	Tanha Dil	"Is Pyar Mein?"	Shaan	
2000	Tanha Dil	"Shaan Se"	Shaan	
2000	Tanha Dil	"Faasle"	Shaan	
2000	Tanha Dil	"Baby? Tu Hai Kahan"	Shaan	
2006	Tishnagi	"Badal Gaya"	Shaan	
2006	Tishnagi	"Chipe Chipe"	Shaan	
2006	Tishnagi	"Jhoom Le"	Shaan	
2006	Tishnagi	"Pyaar Ka Safa"	Shaan	
2006	Tishnagi	"Koi To Hoga"	Shaan	
2006	Tishnagi	"Shuraat"	Shaan	
2012	Love is in the Air	"Jaan Ho Mere"	Shaan	

== As a music director ==
Year	Film(s)	Song	Singer(s)	Ref.
2016	Reti	"Nimut Taryache"	Shaan, Nihira Joshi	
2016	Great Grand Masti	"Lipstick Laga Ke"	Shaan, Payal Dev	
2018	Baa Baaa Black Ship	"Baa Baaa Black Ship"	Shaan, Manisha Chakraborty	
2018	Baa Baaa Black Ship	"Heer"	Mika Singh, Mahalakshmi Iyer	
2018	Baa Baaa Black Ship	"Angelina"	Sonu Nigam	
2018	Baa Baaa Black Ship	"Ram Leela"	Kumar Sapan	
2018	Baa Baaa Black Ship	"Galla Goriyan / Aaja Soniye"	Mika Singh, Kanika Kapoor	

== As a lyricist ==
Year	Album	Songs
1991	Star Crazy	"Nakhro De Nakhre"
1996	Naujawan	"Aisa Hota Hai"
1997	Love Ology	"Love Ology"
2000	Tanha Dil	"Gumsum"
2000	Tanha Dil	"Faasle"
2000	Tanha Dil	"(Baby) Tu Hai Kahan?"
2000	Tanha Dil	"Shaan Se"
2001	Borosha Bohu Asha	"Toktoki Tokarmat"
2003	Aksar	All songs
