= Indian pop =

Pop music produced in India

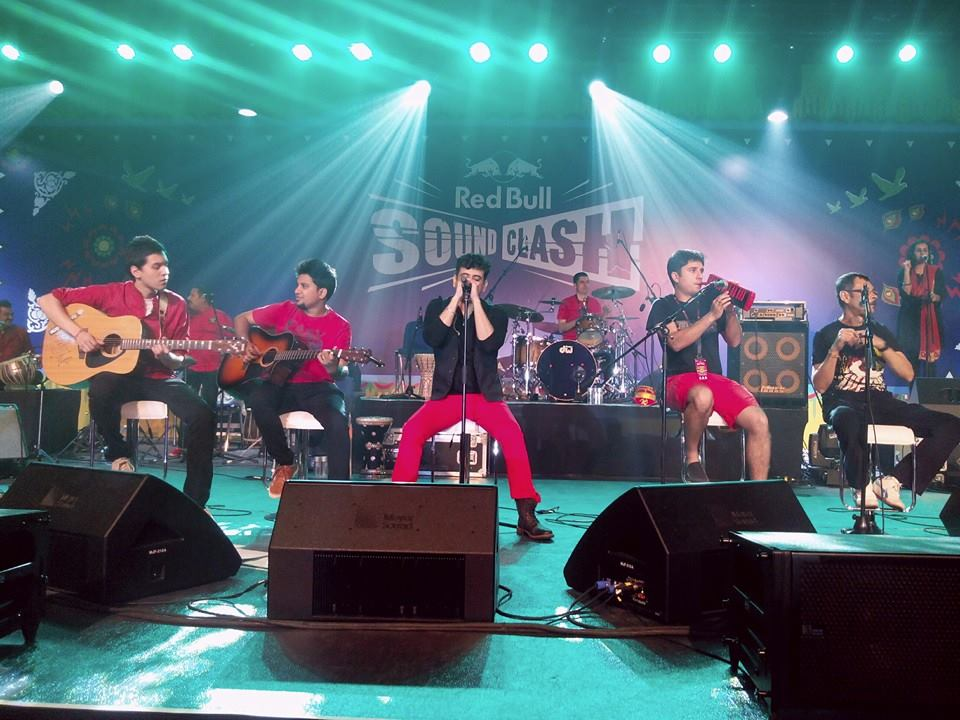
- Euphoria performing at the Red Bull SoundClash concert in Dubai, November 2014
- Other names: Indi-pop • I-pop
- Stylistic origins: Bollywood music; Indian music; Tamil music; Telugu music
- Cultural origins: 1960s—1990s, India, Pakistan, Bangladesh, United Kingdom

Subgenres
- Asian Underground; Bhangra; Bhangragga; Bollywood reprise; Hindi dance music; Indian rock

Indian pop music, also known as Indi-pop or I-pop, refers to pop music produced in India that is independent from film soundtracks for Indian cinema. Indian pop is closely linked to Indian cinema (Bollywood, Tollywood, Pollywood and Kollywood), Pakistani pop music, and the Asian Underground scene of the United Kingdom. The variety of South Asian music from different countries are generally known as Desi music.

== History ==
Pop music originated in Pakistan with the playback singer Ahmed Rushdi's song "Ko Ko Korina" in 1966 and has since then been adopted in India, Bangladesh, and lately Sri Lanka, and Nepal as a pioneering influence in their respective pop cultures. Following Rushdi's success, Christian bands specialising in jazz started performing at various night clubs and hotel lobbies in various Southeast Asian cities. They would usually sing either famous American jazz hits or cover Rushdi's songs.

Pop music began gaining popularity across the Indian subcontinent in the early 1980s, with Pakistani singers Nazia and Zoheb Hassan forming a sibling duo whose records, produced by Biddu, sold as many as 60 million copies. Biddu himself previously had success in the Western world, where he was one of the first successful disco producers in the early 1970s, with hits such as the hugely popular "Kung Fu Fighting" (1974).

The term Indipop was first used by the British-Indian fusion band Monsoon in their 1981 EP release on Steve Coe's Indipop Records. Charanjit Singh's Synthesizing: Ten Ragas to a Disco Beat (1982) anticipated the sound of acid house music, years before the genre arose in the Chicago house scene of the late 1980s, using the Roland TR-808 drum machine, TB-303 bass synthesizer, and Jupiter-8 synthesizer.

In the late 2000s, Indi-pop music faced increasing competition from film music. Major pop singers stopped releasing albums and started singing for movies. Recently, Indian pop has taken an interesting turn with the "remixing" of songs from past Indian movie songs, new beats being added to them.

In 2022, Jaimin Rajani, an Indian singer-songwriter, fused the sitar's Indian classical sound with Western rock sensibilities in "Something Here to Stay," a track from his debut album Cutting Loose.

I-pop is a new and emerging music genre in India, blending Indian sounds with global pop influences. It features a mix of Hindi and regional languages, with themes ranging from romance to social issues. Gaining popularity among youth, I-pop reflects a shift from traditional Bollywood music, driven by independent artists and digital platforms.

== Lists ==
=== Best-selling albums ===
Rank	Year	Album	Artist(s)	Sales (millions)	Ref
1	1995	Bolo Ta Ra Ra..	Daler Mehndi	20	
2	1995	Billo De Ghar	Abrar-ul-Haq	16	
3	1981	Disco Deewane	Nazia and Zoheb Hassan	14	
4	1998	"Mundian To Bach Ke"	Panjabi MC	10	
4	2002	Assan Jana Mall-o Mall	Abrar-ul-Haq	10	
6	1999	Bay Ja Cycle Tay	Abrar-ul-Haq	6.5	
7	1997	Majajani	Abrar-ul-Haq	6	
7	1997	Only One	Nusrat Fateh Ali Khan and Mahmood Khan	6	
9	1992	Thanda Thanda Pani	Baba Sehgal	5	
9	1995	Made in India	Alisha Chinai	5	
11	1997	Tum To Thehre Pardesi	Altaf Raja	4	
12	1993	Tootak Tootak Toothian	Malkit Singh	2.5	
13	1996	Sunoh	Lucky Ali	2	
13	1997	Vande Mataram	A. R. Rahman (featuring Nusrat Fateh Ali Khan)	2	
13	1998	Sifar	Lucky Ali	2	
13	2004	Me Against Myself	Jay Sean	2	
17	2004	Nachan Main Audhay Naal	Abrar-ul-Haq	1.8	
18	1999	Deewana	Sonu Nigam	1.2	
18	1999	Oye Hoye	Harbhajan Mann	1.2	
20	1996	Naujawan	Shaan	1	
20	1997	Duniya	Raageshwari	1	
20	2000	Tanha Dil...	Shaan	1	

=== Music video streams ===
Year	Song	Artist(s)	Language	YouTube streams (millions)	Ref
2020	"Butta Bomma"	Thaman S, Armaan Malik	Telugu	820	
2020	"Brown Munde"	AP Dhillon, Gurinder Gill, Shinda Kahlon	Punjabi	605	
2019	"Rowdy Baby"	Yuvan Shankar Raja, Dhanush	Tamil	1400	
2017	"Jai Deva Ganesha"	Abhay Jain	Hindi	29	
2017	"Lahore"	Guru Randhawa	Punjabi	750	
2017	"Bom Diggy"	Zack Knight and Jasmin Walia	Punjabi	720	
2017	"High Rated Gabru"	Guru Randhawa	Punjabi	1168	
2014	"Zaroori Tha"	Rahat Fateh Ali Khan	Hindi	1427	
2015	"Dheere Dheere"	Yo Yo Honey Singh	Hindi	625	
2011	"Why This Kolaveri Di"	Dhanush and Anirudh Ravichander	Tamil	227	
