= 1976 in British television =

This is a list of British television-related events in 1976.

== Events ==
=== January ===
- 2 January – Sheffield Cablevision closes when its funds run out.
- 5 January – BBC1 begins showing the children's stop motion animated series Paddington, based on the books by Michael Bond and narrated by Michael Hordern.
- 6 January – The children's supernatural comedy series Rentaghost debuts on BBC1.
- 7 January – Debut of the Michael Palin and Terry Jones comedy anthology series Ripping Yarns on BBC2.
- 13 January – BBC1 screens the Mike Leigh comedy drama Nuts in May as part of the Play for Today series.
- 25 January – ITV screens the network television premiere of the 1969 comedy caper The Italian Job, starring Michael Caine.

=== February ===
- 4 February – Early morning programming from the Open University begins on BBC1 with Electrons in motion airing at 7:05am. It is shown only on UHF 625-line transmitters.
- 20 February – The first regular episode of the Ronnie Barker- and David Jason-starring comedy series Open All Hours airs on BBC2, almost three years after the pilot episode was first shown.

=== April ===
- 3 April – The 21st Eurovision Song Contest (held in The Hague) is won by Brotherhood of Man, representing the United Kingdom, with their song "Save Your Kisses for Me". It is broadcast live on BBC1.
- 5 April – Pat Phoenix returns to the role of Elsie Tanner on Coronation Street after an absence of three years.
- 6 April – Original scheduled airdate of Dennis Potter's Brimstone and Treacle in BBC1's Play for Today series. The film is pulled from transmission due to controversy over its content, including the rape of a woman by the devil. It is eventually shown on the channel in 1987, after having been made into a film starring Sting in 1982.
- 7 April – Margot Bryant makes her last appearance as Minnie Caldwell on Coronation Street.
- 23 April – BBC1 debuts the American police action series Starsky & Hutch, starring David Soul and Paul Michael Glaser, with the feature-length pilot episode.
- 25 April – The supernatural comedy series, The Ghosts of Motley Hall debuts on ITV.
- 26 April – Carry On and Bless This House actor Sid James dies from a heart attack during a performance of The Mating Season at the Sunderland Empire Theatre.

=== May ===
- 2 May – Network television premiere of the 1963 James Bond film From Russia with Love on ITV, starring Sean Connery.
- May – London Weekend Television is reorganised, to form a new company "LWT (Holdings) Limited". which allows the company to expand into a number of new ventures, including Hutchinson Publishing.

=== June ===
- 18 June – New Broadcasting House (Manchester) is officially inaugurated as the headquarters of BBC North.

=== July ===
- 1 July – American science-fiction series The Bionic Woman, starring Lindsay Wagner, launches on ITV and reaches number one in the ratings, an almost unheard-of event for a science-fiction series.
- 5 July – The 1967 biographical crime film Bonnie and Clyde, starring Warren Beatty and Faye Dunaway, is shown on BBC1 for the first time.
- 17 July–1 August – The BBC provides extensive live coverage of the 1976 Summer Olympic Games from Montreal. BBC1 broadcasts into the early hours to provide live coverage of the swimming and athletics events with overnight highlights and coverage of other sports shown the following afternoon.
- 23 July – That night's edition of BBC's Nationwide saw the British television debut of New Zealand born investigative journalist Roger Cook.
- 26 July – Channel Television becomes the final ITV region to begin broadcasting in colour, although it is not until the following year that all of its local programmes are made in colour.

=== August ===
- A series of the sitcom The Melting Pot, written by and starring in brownface Spike Milligan with Neil Shand, is recorded for BBC2 but never broadcast.

=== September ===
- 4 September – ITV screens the network television premiere of Mike Hodges' 1971 gangster film Get Carter, starring Michael Caine.
- 5 September – ITV shows the first episode of Jim Henson's family puppet sketch comedy The Muppet Show, hosted by Kermit the Frog, produced at ATV Elstree Studios.
- 6 September
  - Northern Life replaces Today at Six as Tyne Tees' regional news programme.
  - George and Mildred, a spin-off from the comedy series Man About the House debuts on ITV.
- 8 September – BBC1 debuts the Leonard Rossiter-starring comedy serial The Fall and Rise of Reginald Perrin.
- 9 September – Documentary Death in the West, containing an admission from a tobacco company representative that smoking causes health problems, is shown on Thames Television. The film is only shown once due to a court order which prevented the film from being shown again.
- 18 September – Ronnie Barker's comedy sketch "Four Candles" is first broadcast in The Two Ronnies.
- 20 September – BBC2 begins showing the Roman Empire-set series I, Claudius, starring Derek Jacobi as the titular Roman Emperor.
- Unknown date – The credits of each programme produced by the BBC reveals the copyrighted years in Roman numerals for the first time since Chigley in 1969.

=== October ===
- 2 October – The first edition of Saturday morning children's magazine show Multi-Coloured Swap Shop is broadcast on BBC1, hosted by Noel Edmonds, John Craven and Keith Chegwin.
- 15 October – The American 1950's-set comedy series Happy Days airs on ITV, in the Grampian and Southern regions, and in London the following day. Other areas begin to show the series shortly afterwards.
- 22 October – 1960s series The Avengers returns as The New Avengers, with Patrick Macnee resuming his role as John Steed, alongside Joanna Lumley as Purdey and Gareth Hunt as Mike Gambit.
- 23 October – Sarah Jane Smith (played by Elisabeth Sladen) leaves Doctor Who. The events following her departure will not be revealed until a return appearance thirty years later in the revived series.
- 29 October – BBC1 screens the network premiere of Roman Polanski's 1968 occult horror film Rosemary's Baby.

=== November ===
- 3 November – ITV screens the network television premiere of the blockbuster 1964 James Bond film Goldfinger, starring Sean Connery.
- 11 November – The "Gwen Troake's Banquet" episode of reality television series The Big Time is broadcast on BBC1 which leads two weeks later to the termination of Fanny Cradock's contract with the BBC due to her patronising attitude towards the amateur chef.

=== December ===
- 1 December – Punk group The Sex Pistols cause a storm of controversy and outrage by swearing well before the 9pm watershed on the regional Thames Television news programme Today, hosted by Bill Grundy, who has goaded them into doing so and is temporarily sacked. Today is replaced by Thames at Six a year later.
- 22 December – BBC1 shows the Charles Dickens ghost story The Signalman, starring Denholm Elliott.
- 25 December – Television premiere of the 1968 musical version of Charles Dickens Oliver! on BBC1, starring Ron Moody, Oliver Reed and Mark Lester.
- 31 December – ITV shows the network premiere of the 1964 historical war film Zulu, starring Michael Caine.

=== Unknown ===
- Swindon Viewpoint's experimental phase ends when EMI decides to pull out of funding the service. However, the channel continues after being sold to the public of Swindon for £1.
- Arthur Billitt succeeds Percy Thrower as principal host of BBC2's Gardeners' World after the BBC does not renew Thrower's contract following his agreement to front a series of commercials on independent television for gardening products from ICI Plant Protection.

== Debuts ==
=== BBC1 ===
- 4 January – The Prince and the Pauper (1976)
- 5 January – Paddington (1976; 1978–1980)
- 6 January – Rentaghost (1976–1984)
- 7 January – Marco, 3000 Leagues in Search for Mother
- 8 January – When the Boat Comes In (1976–1977; 1981)
- 13 January – Nuts in May (1976) (originally in Play for Today)
- 21 January – Kizzy (1976)
- 9 February – Jumbo Spencer (1976)
- 29 February – The Flight of the Heron (1976)
- 3 March – Rocky O'Rourke (1976)
- 8 March – BBC Evening News (1976–1983, 1984)
- 14 April – John Macnab (1976)
- 23 April – Starsky & Hutch (1975–1979)
- 27 May – Second Verdict (1976)
- 31 May – Mike Yarwood in Persons (1976–1981)
- 26 August – Sailor (1976)
- 4 September – The Duchess of Duke Street (1976–1977)
- 5 September – Lorna Doone (1976)
- 8 September – The Fall and Rise of Reginald Perrin (1976–1979)
- 9 September – Gangsters (1976–1978)
- 13 September
  - Noah and Nelly in... SkylArk (1976)
  - Potter's Picture Palace (1976–1978)
- 2 October – Multi-Coloured Swap Shop (1976–1982)
- 10 October – Katy (1976)
- 15 October – The Quest (1976)
- 10 November – The Canal Children (1976)
- 21 November – Little Lord Fauntleroy (1976)
- 26 December – The Val Doonican Music Show (1976–1986)
- 28 December – James and the Giant Peach (1976)
- 29 December – The Phoenix and the Carpet (1976–1977)

=== BBC2 ===
- 7 January – Ripping Yarns (1976–1979)
- 21 January – The Glittering Prizes (1976)
- 4 February – The Mike Reid Show (1976–1978)
- 17 February – One Man and His Dog (1976–present)
- 20 February – Open All Hours (BBC2 1976, BBC1 1981–1982, 1985, 2013)
- 1 March – Our Mutual Friend (1976)
- 19 March – Battle of the Sexes (1976)
- 16 July – Orde Wingate (1976)
- 14 August – Masters of Terror (1976)
- 20 September – I, Claudius (1976)
- 21 September – The Water Margin (1973–1974)
- 22 September – Rogue Male (1976)
- 24 September – Well Anyway (1976)
- 29 September – The Mind Beyond (1976) (Anthology)
- 3 December – Brensham People (1976)
- 13 December – The Lady of the Camellias (1976)

=== ITV ===
- 1 January – Clayhanger (1976)
- 2 January – The Georgian House (1976)
- 4 January – A Place to Hide (1976)
- 7 January – Life and Death of Penelope (1976)
- 9 January
  - Bouquet of Barbed Wire (1976)
  - Yus, My Dear (1976)
  - Yes, Honestly (1976–1977)
- 11 January – Red Letter Day (1976)
- 19 January – Hello Cheeky (1976)
- 15 February – Dominic (1976)
- 24 February – Rock Follies (1976–1977)
- 17 March – The Molly Wopsies (1976)
- 26 March – 4 Idle Hands (1976)
- 31 March – Luke's Kingdom (1976)
- 1 April – Garnock Way (1976–1979)
- 6 April – Plays for Britain (1976)
- 9 April – The Fosters (1976–1977)
- 25 April – The Ghosts of Motley Hall (1976–1978)
- 28 April – Westway (1976)
- 19 May – Dangerous Knowledge (1976)
- 30 May – Big Boy Now! (1976–1977)
- 6 June – Murder (1976)
- 7 June – Bill Brand (1976)
- 13 June – Operation Patch (1976)
- 21 June – The Feathered Serpent (1976–1978)
- 30 June – Killers (1976)
- 1 July – The Bionic Woman (1976–1978, 2007)
- 3 July
  - Nobody Does It Like Marti (1976)
  - The XYY Man (1976–1977)
- 18 July – Forget Me Not (1976)
- 31 August – Cilla's World of Comedy (1976)
- 1 September – Star Maidens (1976)
- 2 September – The Howerd Confessions (1976)
- 3 September
  - Lucky Feller (1976)
  - The Many Wives of Patrick (1976–1978)
  - Victorian Scandals (1976)
- 5 September – The Muppet Show (1976–1981)
- 6 September
  - George and Mildred (1976–1979)
  - Northern Life (1976–1992)
- 16 September – The Crezz (1976)
- 20 September – The Cedar Tree (1976–1979)
- 27 September – Chorlton and the Wheelies (1976–1979)
- 27 September – Nobody's House (1976)
- 28 September – Dickens of London (1976)
- 14 October – N.U.T.S. (1976)
- 15 October – Happy Days (1974–1984)
- 16 October – Beasts (1976)
- 22 October – The New Avengers (1976–1977)
- 15 November – Pauline's Quirkes (1976)
- 22 November – Yanks Go Home (1976–1977)
- 29 December – The Dame of Sark (1976)
- Unknown – What's on Next? (1976–1978)

== Continuing television shows ==
^{^[e]} signifies that this show has a related event in the Events section above.

=== 1920s ===
- BBC Wimbledon (1927–1939, 1945–2019, 2021–present)

=== 1930s ===
- Trooping the Colour (1937–1939, 1945–2019, 2023–present)
- The Boat Race (1938–1939, 1945–2019, 2021–present)
- BBC Cricket (1939, 1945–1999, 2020–2024)

=== 1950s ===
- Come Dancing (1950–1998)
- Panorama (1953–present)
- The Good Old Days (1953–1983)
- This Is Your Life (1955–2003)
- Crackerjack (1955–1984, 2020–present)
- Opportunity Knocks (1956–1978)
- What the Papers Say (1956–2008)
- The Sky at Night (1957–present)
- Blue Peter (1958–present)
- Grandstand (1958–2007)

=== 1960s ===
- Coronation Street (1960–present)^{[e]}
- Songs of Praise (1961–present)
- Z-Cars (1962–1978)
- Crown Court (1972–1984)
- Doctor Who (1963–1989, 1996, 2005–present)
- Top of the Pops (1964–2006)
- Match of the Day (1964–present)
- Crossroads (1964–1988, 2001–2003)
- Play School (1964–1988)
- Call My Bluff (1965–2005)
- World of Sport (1965–1985)
- Mr & Mrs. (1965–1999)
- Jackanory (1965–1996, 2006)
- Sportsnight (1965–1997)
- The Money Programme (1966–2010)
- Reksio (1967–1990)
- Dad's Army (1968–1977)
- Magpie (1968–1980)
- The Benny Hill Show (1969–1989)
- The Big Match (1968–2002)
- Nationwide (1969–1983)
- Screen Test (1969–1984)

=== 1970s ===
- Play for Today (1970–1984)^{[e]}
- The Old Grey Whistle Test (1971–1987)
- The Two Ronnies (1971–1987, 1991, 1996, 2005)
- Thunderbirds (1972–1980, 1984–1987)
- Are You Being Served? (1972–1985)
- Pebble Mill at One (1972–1986, 1991–1996)
- Rainbow (1972–1992, 1994–1997)
- Emmerdale Farm (1972–present)
- John Craven's Newsround (1972–present)
- Last of the Summer Wine (1973–2010)
- Superstars (1973–1985, 2003–2005)
- The Tomorrow People (1973–1979, 1992–1995)
- Tiswas (1974–1982)
- Wish You Were Here...? (1974–2003)
- Arena (1975–present)
- Jim'll Fix It (1975–1994)
- Survivors (1975–1977)
- The Good Life (1975–1978)
- The Bionic Woman (1976–1978, 2007)^{[e]}
- Pop Quest (1975–1978)
- Runaround (1975–1981)
- Gambit (1975–1985, 1995)
- Space: 1999 (1975–1977)
- Supersonic (1975–1977)
- The Sweeney (1975–1978)
- Celebrity Squares (1975–1979, 1993–1997, 2014–2015)

== Ending this year ==
- Unknown
  - Rutland Weekend Television (1975–1976)
  - Noah and Nelly in... SkylArk (1976)
- 22 January – Love Thy Neighbour (1972–1976)
- 10 February – Shades of Greene (1975–1976)
- 16 March – Bod (1975–1976)
- 26 March – Open All Hours (1976, 1981–1982, 1985, 2013)
- 7 April – Man About the House (1973–1976)
- 22 April – Bless This House (1971–1976)
- 1 May – Dixon of Dock Green (1955–1976)
- 28 May – Hadleigh (1969–1976)
- 31 May – Maya the Honey Bee (1975–1976)
- 21 June – My Brother's Keeper (1975–1976)
- 1 December — Star Maidens (1976)
- 15 December – Softly, Softly: Task Force (1969–1976)
- 31 December – Marco, 3000 Leagues in Search for Mother (1976)

== Births ==
- 19 January – Marsha Thomason, actress
- 21 January – Emma Bunton, musician (Spice Girls) and television presenter
- 28 January – Lee Ingleby, actor
- 3 February – Caroline Bilton, journalist and newsreader
- 8 February – Abi Titmuss, television presenter and model
- 10 February – Keeley Hawes, actress
- 12 February – Jenni Falconer, television presenter
- 2 March – Helen Latham, actress
- 21 March – Celina Hinchcliffe, television sports presenter
- 24 March – Angellica Bell, television presenter
- 18 April – Sean Maguire, actor and singer
- 27 April – Sally Hawkins, English actress
- 29 April – Ana Boulter, television presenter
- 14 May – Martine McCutcheon, actress and singer
- 2 June – Marek Larwood, actor
- 5 June
  - Rachel Leskovac, actress
  - Ross Noble, comedian
- 13 June – Kym Marsh, actress and singer
- 14 June – Alan Carr, comedian, gameshow host and winner of The Celebrity Traitors UK
- 28 June – Lorraine Stanley, actress
- 1 July – Kellie Bright, actress
- 7 July – Natasha Collins, actress and model (died 2008)
- 8 July – Alex Fletcher, actress
- 12 July – Anna Friel, actress
- 13 July – Lisa Riley, actress and television presenter
- 19 July
  - Ellie Crisell, journalist and news presenter
  - Benedict Cumberbatch, actor
- 8 August – Laura Kuenssberg, political journalist
- 9 August – Rhona Mitra, actress
- 6 September – Naomie Harris, actress
- 23 September – Rob James-Collier, actor and model
- 21 October – Andrew Scott, actor
- 23 October – Cat Deeley, television presenter
- 1 November – Beth Cordingly, actress
- 8 December – Dominic Monaghan, actor
- Unknown – Bryan Kirkwood, television producer

== Deaths ==
- 26 April – Sid James, actor and comedian
- 19 August – Alastair Sim, actor

== See also ==
- 1976 in British music
- 1976 in British radio
- 1976 in the United Kingdom
- List of British films of 1976
