= 1976 in British music =

This is a summary of 1976 in music of all genres in the United Kingdom, including the official charts from that year.

== Overview ==
This year saw the emergence of disco as a force to be reckoned with, a trend which would hold for the rest of the decade and peak in the last two years. This was also the year which truly established ABBA as the top selling act of the decade with them achieving their second, third and fourth number ones (as well as releasing the biggest-selling album of the year). The ABBA formula was also replicated in the biggest-selling song of the year – the Eurovision-winning "Save Your Kisses for Me" by Brotherhood of Man, who began a three-year run in the UK charts from 1976. Other acts to achieve notable firsts were Elton John, who scored his first UK number one single this year (albeit as a duet with Kiki Dee), Showaddywaddy had their first and only number one and long-standing hitmaker Johnny Mathis also scored his biggest hit this year. The album charts saw TV advertising become a major factor in changing the landscape of big sellers with non-regular singles artists achieving high sales with compilations. Among these were Slim Whitman, Bert Weedon, Glen Campbell and The Beach Boys, who remained at number one for ten consecutive weeks.

Also emerging this year was a new trend, which became known as punk rock. This was little evident on the charts as yet, and was more a lifestyle choice, but would become much more significant the following year, as many new acts who typified the trend came onto the scene.

Britain's foremost classical composers of the late 20th century, including Sir William Walton, Benjamin Britten and Sir Michael Tippett, were still active. Sir Charles Groves conducted the Last Night of the Proms, and the soloist for "Rule Britannia" was contralto Anne Collins; the programme included Walton's Portsmouth Point overture.

== Events ==
- 6 March – EMI Records reissues all 22 previously released British Beatles singles, plus a new single of "Yesterday". A number of them hit the UK charts at the same time.
- 7 March – A wax likeness of Elton John is put on display in London's Madame Tussaud's Wax Museum.
- 9 March – The Who's Keith Moon collapses on stage ten minutes into a performance at the Boston Garden.
- 3 April – Brotherhood of Man win the Eurovision Song Contest for the UK with the song "Save Your Kisses For Me". It goes on to be the biggest-selling Eurovision winner ever.
- 3 May – Paul McCartney and Wings start their Wings over America Tour in Fort Worth, Texas. This is the first time McCartney has performed in the US since the Beatles' last concert in 1966 at Candlestick Park.
- 19 May – Rolling Stones guitarist Keith Richards is involved in a car accident. Cocaine is found in his wrecked car. Richards is given a court date of 12 January 1977.
- 2 July – Benjamin Britten is created Baron Britten of Aldeburgh in the County of Suffolk, less than six months before his death.
- 4 July – Elton John performs for a crowd of 62,000 at Shaffer Stadium, Foxboro, Massachusetts, as part of the United States Bicentennial celebrations.
- 5 August – A drunken Eric Clapton, appearing at the Birmingham Odeon, calls on his audience to support Enoch Powell and oppose immigration.
- 9 August – Aged 21, Simon Rattle becomes the youngest ever Proms conductor with his late night London Sinfonietta performance. The programme includes Harrison Birtwistle's Meridian and Arnold Schoenberg's Chamber Symphony No. 1.
- 11 August – Keith Moon, drummer of the Who, is rushed to hospital for the second time in five months, in a "mentally disturbed" state, after trashing his Miami hotel room.
- 11 September – Sir Charles Groves conducts the Last Night of the Proms, which includes music by Britten, William Walton, Frederick Delius and other British composers. Anne Collins is guest soloist.
- 20 September & 21 September – The 100 Club Punk Festival, the first international punk festival is held in London. Siouxsie and the Banshees play their first concert.
- 8 October – The Sex Pistols sign a contract with EMI Records.
- November – The recently formed Rock Against Racism pressure group holds its first gig, featuring Carol Grimes.

== Charts ==
=== Number-one singles ===
Date	Song	Artist(s)
10 January	"Bohemian Rhapsody"	Queen
17 January	"Bohemian Rhapsody"	Queen
24 January	"Bohemian Rhapsody"	Queen
31 January	"Mamma Mia"	ABBA
7 February	"Mamma Mia"	ABBA
14 February	"Forever and Ever"	Slik
21 February	"December, 1963 (Oh, What a Night)"	The Four Seasons
28 February	"December, 1963 (Oh, What a Night)"	The Four Seasons
6 March	"I Love to Love (But My Baby Loves to Dance)"	Tina Charles
13 March	"I Love to Love (But My Baby Loves to Dance)"	Tina Charles
20 March	"I Love to Love (But My Baby Loves to Dance)"	Tina Charles
27 March	"Save Your Kisses for Me"	Brotherhood of Man
3 April	"Save Your Kisses for Me"	Brotherhood of Man
10 April	"Save Your Kisses for Me"	Brotherhood of Man
17 April	"Save Your Kisses for Me"	Brotherhood of Man
24 April	"Save Your Kisses for Me"	Brotherhood of Man
1 May	"Save Your Kisses for Me"	Brotherhood of Man
8 May	"Fernando"	ABBA
15 May	"Fernando"	ABBA
22 May	"Fernando"	ABBA
29 May	"Fernando"	ABBA
5 June	"No Charge"	J.J. Barrie
12 June	"The Combine Harvester (Brand New Key)"	The Wurzels
19 June	"The Combine Harvester (Brand New Key)"	The Wurzels
26 June	"You to Me Are Everything"	Real Thing
3 July	"You to Me Are Everything"	Real Thing
10 July	"You to Me Are Everything"	Real Thing
17 July	The Roussos Phenomenon EP	Demis Roussos
24 July	"Don't Go Breaking My Heart"	Elton John and Kiki Dee
31 July	"Don't Go Breaking My Heart"	Elton John and Kiki Dee
7 August	"Don't Go Breaking My Heart"	Elton John and Kiki Dee
14 August	"Don't Go Breaking My Heart"	Elton John and Kiki Dee
21 August	"Don't Go Breaking My Heart"	Elton John and Kiki Dee
28 August	"Don't Go Breaking My Heart"	Elton John and Kiki Dee
4 September	"Dancing Queen"	ABBA
11 September	"Dancing Queen"	ABBA
18 September	"Dancing Queen"	ABBA
25 September	"Dancing Queen"	ABBA
2 October	"Dancing Queen"	ABBA
9 October	"Dancing Queen"	ABBA
16 October	"Mississippi"	Pussycat
23 October	"Mississippi"	Pussycat
30 October	"Mississippi"	Pussycat
6 November	"Mississippi"	Pussycat
13 November	"If You Leave Me Now"	Chicago
20 November	"If You Leave Me Now"	Chicago
27 November	"If You Leave Me Now"	Chicago
4 December	"Under the Moon of Love"	Showaddywaddy
11 December	"Under the Moon of Love"	Showaddywaddy
18 December	"Under the Moon of Love"	Showaddywaddy
25 December	"When a Child Is Born"	Johnny Mathis
1 January	"When a Child Is Born"	Johnny Mathis

=== Number-one albums ===
Date	Album	Artist(s)	Weeks
10 January	40 Greatest Hits	Perry Como	1
17 January	A Night at the Opera	Queen	2
24 January	A Night at the Opera	Queen	2
31 January	The Best of Roy Orbison	Roy Orbison	1
7 February	The Very Best of Slim Whitman	Slim Whitman	6
14 February	The Very Best of Slim Whitman	Slim Whitman	6
21 February	The Very Best of Slim Whitman	Slim Whitman	6
28 February	The Very Best of Slim Whitman	Slim Whitman	6
6 March	The Very Best of Slim Whitman	Slim Whitman	6
13 March	The Very Best of Slim Whitman	Slim Whitman	6
20 March	Blue for You	Status Quo	3
27 March	Blue for You	Status Quo	3
3 April	Blue for You	Status Quo	3
10 April	Rock Follies	Television soundtrack	2
17 April	Rock Follies	Television soundtrack	2
24 April	Presence	Led Zeppelin	1
1 May	Rock Follies	Television soundtrack	1
8 May	Greatest Hits	ABBA	9
15 May	Greatest Hits	ABBA	9
22 May	Greatest Hits	ABBA	9
29 May	Greatest Hits	ABBA	9
5 June	Greatest Hits	ABBA	9
12 June	Greatest Hits	ABBA	9
19 June	Greatest Hits	ABBA	9
26 June	Greatest Hits	ABBA	9
3 July	Greatest Hits	ABBA	9
10 July	A Night on the Town	Rod Stewart	2
17 July	A Night on the Town	Rod Stewart	2
24 July	20 Golden Greats	The Beach Boys	10
31 July	20 Golden Greats	The Beach Boys	10
7 August	20 Golden Greats	The Beach Boys	10
14 August	20 Golden Greats	The Beach Boys	10
21 August	20 Golden Greats	The Beach Boys	10
28 August	20 Golden Greats	The Beach Boys	10
4 September	20 Golden Greats	The Beach Boys	10
11 September	20 Golden Greats	The Beach Boys	10
18 September	20 Golden Greats	The Beach Boys	10
25 September	20 Golden Greats	The Beach Boys	10
2 October	The Best of The Stylistics Volume II	The Stylistics	1
9 October	Stupidity	Dr. Feelgood	1
16 October	Greatest Hits	ABBA	2
23 October	Greatest Hits	ABBA	2
30 October	Soul Motion	Various Artists	2
6 November	Soul Motion	Various Artists	2
13 November	The Song Remains the Same	Led Zeppelin	1
20 November	22 Golden Guitar Greats	Bert Weedon	1
27 November	Twenty Golden Greats	Glen Campbell	6
4 December	Twenty Golden Greats	Glen Campbell	6
11 December	Twenty Golden Greats	Glen Campbell	6
18 December	Twenty Golden Greats	Glen Campbell	6
25 December	Twenty Golden Greats	Glen Campbell	6
1 January	Twenty Golden Greats	Glen Campbell	6

== Year-end charts ==
Between 5 January and 10 December 1976.

=== Best-selling singles ===
No.	Title	Artist	Peak position
1	"Save Your Kisses for Me"	Brotherhood of Man	1
2	"Don't Go Breaking My Heart"	Elton John and Kiki Dee	1
3	"Mississippi"	Pussycat	1
4	"Dancing Queen"	ABBA	1
5	"A Little Bit More"	Dr Hook	2
6	"If You Leave Me Now"	Chicago	1
7	"Fernando"	ABBA	1
8	"I Love to Love (But My Baby Loves to Dance)"	Tina Charles	1
9	The Roussos Phenomenon EP	Demis Roussos	1
10	"December, 1963 (Oh, What a Night)"	The Four Seasons	1
11	"Under the Moon of Love"	Showaddywaddy	1
12	"You to Me Are Everything"	The Real Thing	1
13	"Forever and Ever"	Slik	1
14	"Sailing"	Rod Stewart	3
15	"Young Hearts Run Free"	Candi Staton	2
16	"The Combine Harvester (Brand New Key)"	The Wurzels	1
17	"When Forever Has Gone"	Demis Roussos	2
18	"Jungle Rock"	Hank Mizell	3
19	"Can't Get By Without You"	The Real Thing	2
20	"You Make Me Feel Like Dancing"	Leo Sayer	2
21	"Mamma Mia"	ABBA	1
22	"Hurt"	Manhattans	4
23	"Silly Love Songs"	Wings	2
24	"Convoy"	C. W. McCall	2
25	"Kiss and Say Goodbye"	Manhattans	4
26	"You Just Might See Me Cry"	Our Kid	2
27	"Love Really Hurts Without You"	Billy Ocean	2
28	"You See the Trouble with Me"	Barry White	2
29	"Let 'Em In"	Wings	2
30	"No Charge"	J. J. Barrie	1
31	"Jeans On"	David Dundas	3
32	"Don't Take Away the Music"	Tavares	4
33	"Howzat!"	Sherbet	4
34	"Rodrigo's Guitar Concerto D'Aranjuez"	Manuel and the Music of the Mountains	3
35	"Bohemian Rhapsody"	Queen	1
36	"Misty Blue"	Dorothy Moore	5
37	"Heaven Must Be Missing an Angel"	Tavares	4
38	"Dance Little Lady Dance"	Tina Charles	6
39	"I Am a Cider Drinker (Paloma Blanca)"	The Wurzels	3
40	"Music"	John Miles	3
41	"Love Machine"	The Miracles	3
42	"Aria"	Acker Bilk, His Clarinet and Strings	5
43	"Let's Stick Together"	Bryan Ferry	4
44	"In Zaire"	Johnny Wakelin	4
45	"The Killing of Georgie"	Rod Stewart	2
46	"The Girl of My Best Friend"	Elvis Presley	9
47	"Play That Funky Music"	Wild Cherry	7
48	"You Don't Have to Go"	The Chi-Lites	3
49	"I Only Wanna Be with You"	Bay City Rollers	4
50	"Arms of Mary"	Sutherland Brothers and Quiver	5

=== Best-selling albums ===
The list of the top fifty best-selling albums of 1976 were published in Music Week and in Record Mirror at the end of the year, and reproduced in the second edition of the BPI Year Book in 1977. However, in 2007 the Official Charts Company published album chart histories for each year from 1956 to 1977, researched by historian Sharon Mawer, and included an updated list of the top ten best-selling albums for each year based on the new research. The updated top ten for 1976 is shown in the table below.

No.	Title	Artist	Peak position
1	Greatest Hits	ABBA	1
2	20 Golden Greats	The Beach Boys	1
3	Forever and Ever	Demis Roussos	2
4	A Night on the Town	Rod Stewart	1
5	Glen Campbell's Twenty Golden Greats	Glen Campbell	1
6	Their Greatest Hits (1971–1975)	Eagles	2
7	The Very Best of Slim Whitman	Slim Whitman	1
8	A Night at the Opera	Queen	1
9	Desire	Bob Dylan	3
10	Wings at the Speed of Sound	Wings	2

== Bands formed ==
- Elvis Costello & the Attractions
- The Jam
- The Clash
- The Cure
- The Damned
- Generation X
- Madness
- UK Subs

== Bands disbanded ==
- Soft Machine
- The Pretty Things
- Argent
- Deep Purple (they reform in 1984)

== Classical Music: new works ==
- Benjamin Britten – Welcome Ode for young people's voices and orchestra
- Jonathan Harvey – I Love the Lord
- Alun Hoddinott – A Contemplation upon Flowers
- Daniel Jones – Dance Fantasy
- William Mathias – Zodiac Trio
- William Walton – Varii Capricci

== Opera ==
- Peter Maxwell Davies – The Martyrdom of St Magnus
- Iain Hamilton – Tamberlaine (radio)

== Film and Incidental music ==
- John Addison – Swashbuckler (US film).

== Musical films ==
- Bugsy Malone
- The Slipper and the Rose

== Births ==
- 16 January – Stuart Fletcher (The Seahorses)
- 21 January – Emma Bunton, singer (Spice Girls) and actress
- 8 March – Gareth Coombes (Supergrass)
- 15 March – Roger Ratajczak, singer (Code Red)
- 17 March – Stephen Gately, Irish singer (Boyzone)
- 3 April – Will Mellor, singer and actor
- 6 April – James Fox, singer-songwriter
- 18 April – Sean Maguire, singer and actor
- 8 May – Ian "H" Watkins (Steps)
- 10 May – Stuart Braithwaite, singer-songwriter and guitarist (Mogwai)
- 2 June – Tim Rice-Oxley (Keane)
- 13 June
  - Jason "J" Brown, singer (5ive)
  - Kym Marsh, singer (Hear'Say)
- 19 June – James Hearn, singer (Ultra)
- 22 June – Gordon Moakes (Bloc Party)
- 3 July – Shane Lynch, Irish singer (Boyzone)
- 10 July – Philip Howard, pianist and composer
- 13 July – Huw Watkins, composer and pianist
- 28 July – David Oliver, singer (Point Break)
- 12 August – Stuart MacRae, composer
- 15 September
  - KG, singer (MN8)
  - Paul Thomson, drummer (Franz Ferdinand)
- 16 September – Tina Barrett, singer (S Club 7)
- 18 September – Adam Mates, Irish singer (OTT)
- 1 October – Richard Oakes, guitarist (Suede)
- 29 October – Mark Sheehan, Irish singer and guitarist (Mytown, The Script)
- 16 November – Dan Black (The Servant)
- 6 December – Dee Tails, singer (MN8)
- 12 December – Dan Hawkins, English guitarist, songwriter, and producer (The Darkness and Stone Gods)
- 29 December – Brett Adams, singer (Point Break)

== Deaths ==
- 5 January – Mal Evans, Beatles' former roadie and patron of Badfinger, 40 (shot)
- 8 January – George Baker, singer, 90
- 13 January – Isolde Menges, violinist, 82
- 11 February – Margaret Dare, Scottish composer and cellist, 74
- 19 March – Paul Kossoff, guitarist, (Free), 25 (drug-related)
- 26 March – Duster Bennett, blues musician, 29
- 14 May – Keith Relf, vocalist (The Yardbirds), 33 (electrocuted)
- 15 May – David Munrow, early music performer, 33 (suicide)
- 26 May – Dame Maggie Teyte, operatic soprano, 88
- 30 May – Hugo Rignold, violinist and conductor, 71
- 24 August – Michael Head, pianist and composer, 76
- 26 October – Deryck Cooke, musicologist and broadcaster, 57
- 28 November – Harold Darke, organist and composer, 88
- 4 December – Benjamin Britten, composer, 63
- date unknown – Malcolm Boyle, organist and composer, 74

== See also ==
- 1976 in British radio
- 1976 in British television
- 1976 in the United Kingdom
- List of British films of 1976
