= Tina Charles discography =

- Studio albums: 6
- Compilation albums: 8
- Singles: 44

This is the discography of English singer Tina Charles.

== Albums ==
=== Studio albums ===
Title	Album details	Peak chart positions						Certifications
Title	Album details	UK	AUS	FIN	NOR	SPA	SWE	Certifications
I Love to Love	Released: March 1976; Label: CBS; Formats: LP, MC, 8-track	—	34	4	1	9	1	UK: Silver
Dance Little Lady	Released: November 1976; Label: CBS; Formats: LP, MC, 8-track; Released in the US as Rendezvous	—	33	11	2	—	3	UK: Silver
Tina Sings	Released: April 1977; Label: MAM; Formats: LP, MC	—	—	—	—	—	—	
Heart 'n' Soul	Released: August 1977; Label: CBS; Formats: LP, MC, 8-track	35	—	11	8	—	11	UK: Silver
Just One Smile	Released: April 1980; Label: CBS; Formats: LP, MC	—	—	—	—	—	—	
Listen 2 the Music	Released: November 2007; Label: ZakAlex; Formats: CD	—	—	—	—	—	—	
"—" denotes releases that did not chart or were not released in that territory.

=== Compilation albums ===
Title	Album details
Greatest Hits	Released: November 1978; Label: CBS; Formats: LP, MC
Dance Little Lady Dance	Released: September 1981; Label: Hallmark; Formats: LP
I Love to Love	Released: 1987; Label: Black Scorpio; Formats: CD, LP, MC
Originals	Released: 1991; Label: Columbia; Formats: CD, MC
World of Emotion	Released: 1993; Label: Blue Velvet/Pliz; Formats: CD, LP
The Very Best Of	Released: 1996; Label: CMC Home Entertainment; Formats: CD
I Love to Love – The Best of Tina Charles	Released: 2 February 1998; Label: Columbia; Formats: CD
Foundation of Love	Released: 2001; Label: Disky; Formats: CD

== Singles ==
Title	Year	Peak chart positions										Certifications	Album
Title	Year	UK	AUS	AUT	BEL (FLA)	FIN	GER	NL	NZ	SPA	SWE	Certifications	Album
"Nothing in the World"	1969	—	—	—	—	—	—	—	—	—	—		Non-album singles
"In the Middle of the Day"	1969	—	—	—	—	—	—	—	—	—	—		Non-album singles
"Good to Be Alive"	1969	—	—	—	—	—	—	—	—	—	—		Non-album singles
"Bo-Bo's Party"	1970	—	—	—	—	—	—	—	—	—	—		Non-album singles
"Baby Don't You Know Anymore"	1971	—	—	—	—	—	—	—	—	—	—		Non-album singles
"One Broken Heart for Sale"	1975	—	—	—	—	—	—	—	—	—	—		Non-album singles
"You Set My Heart on Fire"	1975	—	—	—	3	—	—	6	—	7	3		I Love to Love
"I Love to Love (But My Baby Loves to Dance)"	1976	1	6	20	4	6	6	2	7	3	2	UK: Gold	I Love to Love
"I Can't Dance to That Music You're Playin'"	1976	—	—	—	—	—	—	—	—	—	—		Tina Sings
"Love Me Like a Lover"	1976	31	76	—	28	—	13	24	—	—	—		I Love to Love
"Hold Me" (Canada-only release)	1976	—	—	—	—	—	—	—	—	—	—		I Love to Love
"Dance Little Lady Dance"	1976	6	4	—	12	14	8	8	9	13	2	UK: Silver	Dance Little Lady
"Dr. Love"	1976	4	11	—	—	—	20	—	25	21	11	UK: Silver	Dance Little Lady
"Rendezvous"	1977	27	23	—	—	—	—	—	—	—	—		Heart 'n' Soul
"Cookie Face" (Japan-only release)	1977	—	—	—	—	—	—	—	—	—	—		I Love to Love (Japanese release)
"Fallin' in Love in Summertime"	1977	—	—	—	—	—	39	—	—	—	—		Heart 'n' Soul
"Love Bug / Sweets for My Sweet"	1977	26	—	—	—	—	—	—	—	—	—		Heart 'n' Soul
"I'll Go Where Your Music Takes Me"	1978	27	53	—	—	—	—	—	—	—	—		Heart 'n' Soul
"Fire Down Below"	1978	—	—	—	—	—	—	—	—	—	—		Just One Smile
"Makin' All the Right Moves"	1978	—	92	—	—	—	—	—	—	—	—		Just One Smile
"Love Rocks" (Japan-only release)	1978	—	—	—	—	—	—	—	—	—	—		Non-album single
"Boogie Round the Clock"	1979	—	—	—	—	—	—	—	—	—	—		Just One Smile
"You Set My Heart on Fire" (new version)	1979	—	—	—	—	—	—	—	—	—	—		Just One Smile
"Just One Smile"	1980	—	—	—	—	—	—	—	—	—	—		Just One Smile
"I'm Just as Bad as You" (Netherlands-only release)	1980	—	—	—	—	—	—	—	—	—	—		Just One Smile
"Turn Back the Hands of Time"	1980	—	—	—	—	—	—	—	—	—	—		Non-album singles
"Rollin'"	1981	—	—	—	—	—	—	—	—	—	—		Non-album singles
"Love Hunger"	1985	—	—	—	—	—	—	—	—	—	—		Non-album singles
"Running Into Danger"	1985	—	—	—	—	—	—	—	—	—	—		Non-album singles
"I Love to Love" (Sanny X remix)	1986	67	—	4	19	—	5	6	—	—	—		Non-album singles
"Second Time Around"	1986	—	—	—	—	—	—	—	—	—	—		Non-album singles
"Dance Little Lady" (Sanny X remix; Continental Europe and North America-only release)	1987	—	—	25	9	—	—	20	—	31	—		Non-album singles
"I'll Go Where The Music Takes Me" (Thierry Rogen remix; Continental Europe-only release)	1987	—	—	—	—	—	—	82	—	—	—		Non-album singles
"You Set My Heart on Fire" (new version; Continental Europe-only release)	1988	—	—	—	—	27	—	—	—	—	—		Non-album singles
"Go to Work on My Love"	1990	—	—	—	—	—	—	—	—	—	—		Non-album singles
"World of Emotion" (Germany-only release)	1993	—	—	—	—	—	—	—	—	—	—		Non-album singles
"Take My Tears" (Germany-only release)	1994	—	—	—	—	—	—	—	—	—	—		Non-album singles
"Is It Love You're After?"	1998	—	—	—	—	—	—	—	—	—	—		Non-album singles
"I Love to Love 2004" (with Blue Chips; Germany-only release)	2004	—	—	—	—	—	—	—	—	—	—		Non-album singles
"Your Love Is My Light"	2011	—	—	—	—	—	—	—	—	—	—		Non-album singles
"Happy Ending"	2013	—	—	—	—	—	—	—	—	—	—		Non-album singles
"Saturday"	2014	—	—	—	—	—	—	—	—	—	—		Non-album singles
"Baby Love"	2015	—	—	—	—	—	—	—	—	—	—		Non-album singles
"Sing Me"	2015	—	—	—	—	—	—	—	—	—	—		Non-album singles
"—" denotes releases that did not chart or were not released in that territory.
