= 1976 in British radio =

This is a list of events in British radio during 1976.

== Events ==
=== January to February ===
- No events.

=== March ===
- 8 March – Radio 210 begins broadcasting to the Reading area.
- 16 March – Independent Local Radio begins in Northern Ireland when Downtown Radio, begins broadcasting to the Belfast area.
- 29 March – Former BBC Radio Birmingham presenter Les Ross joins the lineup at Birmingham station BRMB.

=== April ===
- 12 April – Beacon Radio in the Wolverhampton area is the final station in the first wave of Independent Local Radio stations to begin transmission.

=== May ===
- 2 May – BBC Radio 1 launches Playground – a "magazine programme of special interest to young listeners." The new programme incorporates Young Ideas in Action which has previously been broadcast as part of Junior Choice.
- 17 May – BBC Radio Highland begins broadcasting programming in Gaelic.

=== June to August ===
- No events.

=== September ===
- 12 September – London Sounds Eastern launches on BBC Radio London and is the first Asian programme to be broadcast in English by the BBC. Previously Asian radio programmes in the United Kingdom were generally aired in the Hindi and Urdu languages.

=== October to November ===
- No events.

=== December ===
- Capital London launches the 'Capital Radio Helpline'.
- The first Festive Fifty is revealed by John Peel on BBC Radio 1.

=== Unknown ===
- Capital London launches the 'Flying Eye', a traffic spotting light aircraft, which reports on traffic congestion on the streets of Central London.
- BBC Radio Leicester, responding to the growth of the size of the South Asian population and rising racial tension in Leicester, introduces a daily community show called 'Six Fifteen' aimed primarily at that community in the city.

== Station debuts ==
- 8 March – Radio 210
- 16 March – Downtown Radio
- 12 April – Beacon Radio

== Programme debuts ==
- 4 January – Quote... Unquote on BBC Radio 4 (1976–2021)
- 14 February – Jim the Great on BBC Radio 2 (1976–1979)
- 27 August – The Burkiss Way on BBC Radio 4 (1976–1980)
- 30 September – The Food Programme on BBC Radio 4 (1976–present)
- Funny You Should Ask on BBC Radio 2 (1976–1982)
- Poetry Please on BBC Radio 4 (1976–present)

== Continuing radio programmes ==
=== 1940s ===
- Sunday Half Hour (1940–2018)
- Desert Island Discs (1942–Present)
- Down Your Way (1946–1992)
- Letter from America (1946–2004)
- Woman's Hour (1946–Present)
- A Book at Bedtime (1949–Present)

=== 1950s ===
- The Archers (1950–Present)
- The Today Programme (1957–Present)
- The Navy Lark (1959–1977)
- Sing Something Simple (1959–2001)
- Your Hundred Best Tunes (1959–2007)

=== 1960s ===
- Farming Today (1960–Present)
- In Touch (1961–Present)
- The Men from the Ministry (1962–1977)
- Petticoat Line (1965–1979)
- The World at One (1965–Present)
- The Official Chart (1967–Present)
- Just a Minute (1967–Present)
- The Living World (1968–Present)
- The Organist Entertains (1969–2018)

=== 1970s ===
- PM (1970–Present)
- Start the Week (1970–Present)
- Week Ending (1970–1998)
- You and Yours (1970–Present)
- I'm Sorry I Haven't a Clue (1972–Present)
- Good Morning Scotland (1973–Present)
- Hello Cheeky (1973–1979)
- Kaleidoscope (1973–1998)
- Newsbeat (1973–Present)
- The News Huddlines (1975–2001)

== Ending this year ==
- 21 January – Petticoat Line (1965–1976)

== Births ==
- 21 January – Emma Bunton, pop singer and broadcast presenter
- February – Tom Sandars, radio continuity announcer and newsreader
- 8 March – Tom Service, classical music presenter
- 23 March – Ed James, disc jockey
- 5 May – Tom Wrigglesworth, comedian
- 19 June – Lisa Shaw, radio presenter and journalist (died 2021)
- 24 June – Zeb Soanes, radio newsreader, continuity announcer and children's author
- 8 August – Laura Kuenssberg, political journalist
- 9 August – Aled Haydn Jones, Welsh radio presenter and producer
- September – Danny Robins, comedy scriptwriter
- 16 November – Danny Wallace, filmmaker, comedian, writer, actor and broadcast presenter and producer
- 20 November – Debbie Barham, comedy scriptwriter (died 2003)
- 24 November – Tommy Sandhu, disc jockey
- 15 December – Chris Warburton, radio presenter

== Deaths ==
- 15 May – David Munrow, early music performer and presenter (Pied Piper on BBC Radio 3), suicide (born 1942)

== See also ==
- 1976 in British music
- 1976 in British television
- 1976 in the United Kingdom
- List of British films of 1976
