= Ian Gillespie =

Ian Gillespie may refer to:

- Ian Gillespie (cricketer) (born 1976), English cricketer
- Ian Gillespie (footballer) (1913–1988), English footballer
- Ian Gillespie (developer) (born 1961), Canadian developer
