= Michael Ball (disambiguation) =

Michael Ball (born 1962) is an English singer, actor and broadcaster.

Michael Ball may also refer to:

- Michael Ball (album), 1992 studio album by Michael Ball
- Michael Ball (TV programme), British music entertainment television programme presented by Michael Ball that aired on ITV from 1993 to 1995
- Michael Ball (footballer) (born 1979), English footballer
- Michael Ball (American football) (born 1964), retired American football player
- Michael Ball (bishop) (born 1932), Bishop of Truro, 1990–1997
- Michael Ball (fashion), CEO of Rock and Republic
- Michael Ball (actor) (born 1943)

== See also ==
- Mike Ball (born 1954), Alabama politician
