= 5000 Volts =

British disco recording act

- Also known as: Airbus
- Origin: London, England
- Genres: Disco
- Years active: 1974–1977, 2012
- Label: Philips Records
- Past members: Tina Charles; Linda Kelly; Martin Jay; Martin Cohen; Kevin Wells; Mike Nelson; Luan Peters

5000 Volts was a British disco recording act that achieved success throughout Europe during the 1970s. The group consisted of vocalists Tina Charles and Martin Jay, with a changing group of session musicians.

== Career ==
They released several singles in the mid-1970s, but did not achieve success until radio stations began playing the B-side to their 1975 single, "Bye Love". The song, "I'm on Fire", was released in its own right and became a major hit throughout Europe, peaking at number 4 on the UK Singles Chart; and at number 1 on the German Top100 Singles chart and the Swedish chart and also number 10 in South Africa. It was also a major top 10 hit in Australia and charted in the United States where it reached number 26, competing against Jim Gilstrap's version of the song, which hit number 78.

Although Tina Charles provided the vocals, she was not publicly acknowledged as the group's singer and for the band's 1975 appearance on BBC Television's Top of the Pops they were fronted by singer/actress Luan Peters.

In 1975, the group was expanded by record producer Tony Eyers into a permanent five piece, with the inclusion of Martin Cohen (bass and vocals), Kevin Wells (drums) and Mike Nelson (keyboards). Subsequent singles failed to attract widespread interest in the UK, although the group became popular in South Africa and Germany. Charles left the group after a dispute with the record label and continued with her solo career. She was replaced by Linda Kelly.

The next single "Doctor Kiss Kiss" reached number 8 in the United Kingdom, and number 6 in South Africa, but the band struggled to maintain public interest. The group disbanded in 1978.

Martin Jay launched a solo career without success, before returning to his earlier role as a session musician, working for bands such as Enigma, Tight Fit in 1981 and the UK Mixmasters in 1990.

In 2012, Tina Charles and Martin Jay reunited to re-record some of their hits. The album Reunited was the result of their reunion.

== Discography ==
=== Albums ===
- 1976: 5000 Volts (Philips Records 9109-215) – SWE #30
- 1997: 5000 Volts (Rem!nd Records 5300211 - The Netherlands, compilation)
- 2012: Reunited

=== Singles ===
Title	Year	Peak chart positions													
Title	Year	UK	AUS	BE (FLA)	BE (WA)	GER	IRE	NL	NOR	NZ	SA	SWE	SWI	US	ZIM
"Fly Away" (as Airbus; Germany and Denmark-only release)	1974	—	—	—	—	—	—	—	—	—	—	—	—	—	—
"I'm on Fire" (originally released in Germany and Italy as Airbus)	1975	4	5	1	5	1	9	5	10	7	10	1	3	26	2
"Motion Man" (Germany-only release)	1975	—	—	—	—	24	—	—	—	—	—	—	—	—	—
"Bye Love"	1976	—	—	17	47	—	—	—	—	—	—	—	—	—	—
"Doctor Kiss Kiss"	1976	8	45	30	—	—	6	24	10	36	6	17	—	—	3
"Light the Flame of Love"	1976	—	—	—	—	—	—	—	—	—	—	—	—	—	—
"Take Me Back"	1976	—	—	—	—	—	—	—	—	—	—	—	—	—	—
"(Walkin' on a) Love Cloud"	1977	—	—	—	—	—	—	—	—	—	1	—	—	—	2
"Can't Stop Myself from Loving You"	1977	—	—	—	—	—	—	—	—	—	12	—	—	—	18
"I'm on Fire" (New Version 97; France-only release)	1997	—	—	—	—	—	—	—	—	—	—	—	—	—	—
"—" denotes releases that did not chart or were not released in that territory.
