= I'll Go Where Your Music Takes Me =

Pop song written by Biddu

Single by Jimmy James and the Vagabonds
- B-side: "I'll Go Where Your Music Takes Me (Disco Version)"
- Released: 26 March 1976
- Studio: Pye Studios
- Genre: Disco
- Length: 3:25
- Label: Pye Records
- Songwriter: Biddu
- Producer: Biddu

"I'll Go Where Your Music Takes Me" is a pop song written in 1976 by Biddu. The track appeared twice in the Top 30 of the UK Singles Chart; firstly when recorded by Jimmy James and the Vagabonds in 1976, and then in 1978, when it was covered by Tina Charles. In both instances, the recordings were produced by Biddu.

== Jimmy James and the Vagabonds ==
The original recording was reviewed in Blues & Soul magazine in March 1976, where it got a three star rating (out of five) and the magazine article stated that "Jimmy (James) sounds like Chuck Jackson on this catchy Biddu creation that has all the straits of a disco record... It's "Doctor's Orders" all over again, really". Jimmy James and the Vagabonds disc reached number 23 in the UK Singles Chart in May 1976, and stayed in that listing for a total of eight weeks.

The song later appeared on a James compilation album, Where Your Music Takes Me, issued by Sequel Records in 1999.

== Tina Charles ==
"I'll Go Where Your Music Takes Me"

Single by Tina Charles
- B-side: "Stop What You're Doing to Me"
- Released: 3 February 1978
- Genre: Disco
- Length: 3:48
- Label: CBS Records
- Songwriter: Biddu
- Producer: Biddu

Tina Charles' rendition reached number 27 in the UK Singles Chart in April 1978, and also stayed for eight weeks. It reached number 18 in Ireland. The record labels of the various countries releases of the single all quoted '1977' due to it being originally released on Charles' fifth album, Heart 'n' Soul. The single itself was not issued until February 1978. The recording was arranged by Biddu and Gerry Shury.
