= I'm on Fire (5000 Volts song) =

1975 single by 5000 Volts

Single by 5000 Volts (Airbus)

from the album 5000 Volts
- B-side: "Still on Fire"
- Released: 1975
- Genre: Disco
- Length: 2:47
- Label: Philips 6006 464
- Songwriter: Tony Eyers
- Producer: Tony Eyers

5000 Volts (Airbus) singles chronology
"I'm on Fire" (1975)	"Bye Love" (1976)

"I'm on Fire" is a single by the band 5000 Volts. In Germany, the single was released under the group name Airbus (on Epic Records). It peaked at number 5 in Australia and was the 55th biggest selling single in Australia in 1976. and charted in the United States, reaching number 26. It reached number four on the UK Singles Chart, and number one on the German Top 100 Singles chart. "I'm On Fire" was also on the Swedish chart and reached number 10 in South Africa and number 12 in Argentina.

The singer Tina Charles provided vocals for the single, but she was not publicly acknowledged because of contractual problems.

It samples Black Is Black (1966) by the band Los Bravos.

== Charts and certifications ==
=== Weekly charts ===
Chart (1975–1976)	Peak Position
Argentina (CAPIF)	12
Australia (Kent Music Report)	5
Austria (Ö3 Austria Top 40)	7
Belgium (Ultratop 50 Flanders)	1
Belgium (Ultratop 50 Wallonia)	5
Canada Top Singles (RPM)	11
Finland (Suomen virallinen lista)	18
Ireland (IRMA)	9
Israel (IBA)	1
Netherlands (Single Top 100)	5
Netherlands (Dutch Top 40)	3
New Zealand (Recorded Music NZ)	7
Norway (VG-lista)	10
South Africa (Springbok Radio)	10
Spain (PROMUSICAE)	13
Sweden	4
Switzerland (Schweizer Hitparade)	3
UK Singles (Official Charts Company)	4
US Billboard Hot 100 (Billboard)	26
West Germany (GfK)	1

== Jim Gilstrap version ==
"I'm on Fire"

Single by Jim Gilstrap
- B-side: "I'm On Fire, Pt. II"
- Released: 1975
- Genre: Disco
- Length: 2:59
- Label: Roxbury RB 2016
- Songwriter: Tony Eyers
- Producer: Wes Farrell

Jim Gilstrap singles chronology
"House Of Strangers" (1975)	"I'm on Fire" (1975)	"Move Me" (1976)

Jim Gilstrap recorded a version which also entered the charts. For the week ending November 15, 1975, Billboard recorded the single at its fourth week in the Soul charts. It had moved to number 37 from its previous position of 45. In Holland it peaked at number 21, spending five weeks in the charts there. In Canada it made a brief appearance at #19 on the RPM charts on December 13, 1975 (no charts published Nov.1 to Dec.6).

== Other versions ==
Chalice recorded a version which was produced by Fritz Muschler and Joe Kleindienst. It was released in 1989 in Austria on Koch Records International AS 145.447. A 12" version was released in Portugal on Musicata 2051. French singer Sheila released a version in 1975 in the French language “ quel Temperament de feu”
