= Jimmy James (singer) =

Jamaican singer (1940–2024)

- Born: Michael James; 13 September 1940; Brown's Town, Jamaica
- Died: 14 May 2024 (aged 83) London, England
- Genres: Soul; funk; R&B; reggae; disco; ska
- Occupation: Singer
- Years active: 1960–2021
- Labels: Pye; Piccadilly
- Formerly of: Jimmy James and the Vagabonds

Michael "Jimmy" James (13 September 1940 – 14 May 2024) was a Jamaican soul singer, known for songs like "Come to Me Softly", "Now Is the Time" and "I'll Go Where Your Music Takes Me". Based in Britain, he performed as the lead singer of Jimmy James and the Vagabonds from the mid-1960s.

== Life and career ==
Michael James was born in Brown's Town, Saint Ann Parish, Jamaica on 13 September 1940. He grew up and began performing in Kingston, Jamaica, where he recorded as a solo artist with producers Coxsone Dodd, Clancy Eccles, and Lyndon Pottinger. His most successful release was an early version of "Come to Me Softly", which found local success and persuaded James to give up a job with the Inland Revenue for a music career.

The Vagabonds were originally formed in 1960. James teamed up with them under Canadian band manager Roger Smith and in April 1964, they relocated to the UK. Ska-Time (Decca Records) was recorded as Jamaica's Own Vagabonds within two weeks of their arrival, and is one of the first examples of Jamaican ska music to be recorded in the UK. It was reissued as Skatime in 1970 on Decca's Eclipse label. After meeting manager Peter Meaden in 1965, Jimmy James and the Vagabonds supported the Who and Rod Stewart who was with his group the Steampacket at the Marquee Club in London. The band played the Shanklin Pier ballroom on the Isle of Wight in June 1965 and returned for two further sold-out concerts that summer. That same year they played the Richmond National Jazz and Blue Festival and they were also on the bill the following year when the festival was at Windsor. He and the Vagabonds shared several bills with Jimi Hendrix's band, the Experience, during the late 1960s when they were both trying to establish themselves. "We used to hang out a lot at clubs like The Bag O'Nails, the Cromwellian and Whiskey A Go Go. A great guy, very quiet and unassuming," James recalled. The Vagabonds and the Experience also played the Ricky Tick and Upper Cut clubs in London in December 1966 and January 1967 respectively, and at the Beachcomber Ballroom in Nottingham.

They signed a recording contract with Pye Records and released their best known studio album, The New Religion in 1966. The band also played as support for the Who, Sonny & Cher, Rod Stewart (who was also on Pye Records at the time) and the Rolling Stones. The band often used the Abbey Road Studios, once being there at the same time the Beatles were recording. Their live performance was captured in the album London Swings – Live at the Marquee Club, also featuring the Alan Bown Set. Jimmy James and the Vagabonds were labelmates and rivals of Geno Washington & the Ram Jam Band.

The Vagabonds disbanded in 1970, but James, who owned the name, enlisted Alan Wood to form a band with a new, all-white line-up in 1973. They had hits in the UK Singles Chart with "I'll Go Where Your Music Takes Me" (1976) and "Now Is the Time". In 1976, they recorded funky disco song "Disco Fever" also. Phil Chen performed bass on Rod Stewart songs such as "Hot Legs", "Da Ya Think I'm Sexy?" and "Young Turks".

Former Vagabonds bass player Alan Wood (1973–77) now runs his own management agency and represents Paul Carrack. In 1979 a new band, Big Business, was formed by Alan Kirk and Andrew Platts, former Vagabonds and they continue to tour to this day. Big Business toured with Mick Jackson ("Blame It on the Boogie"). Kirk owns Hilltop Studios in Dronfield near Chesterfield. In 1999, drummer Russ Courtenay co-wrote the track "Whatever You Need", which appeared on Tina Turner's album, 24/7, and later on her All the Best, Love Songs and The Platinum Collection compilation albums.

In 2007, James contributed to the track "The Other Side of the Street" for Ian Levine's Northern Soul 2007 album.

James regularly performed around the UK with former Foundations frontman, Clem Curtis. The pair, along with Flirtations vocalist Earnestine Pearce toured with 'The Soul Explosion'. In April 2007, James performed at the Classic Gold Weekender along with Marmalade, Love Affair and Showaddywaddy. In 2013, they toured with James' early hero, Ben E. King.. He also toured with the group The Sweet Soul Music Revue, mostly in Germany.

At the age of 80, James continued with concert appearances into the latter half of 2021, but he later retired from performing due to medical conditions. He died surrounded by his loving family on 14 May 2024, at the age of 83.

== The Vagabonds ==
Members of the Vagabonds have included:

- Phil Chen (guitar, bass guitar, 1960–1970)
- Rupert Balgobin (drums, 1960–1970)
- Barry Sutton (trumpet, 1967–1970)
- Colston Chen (bass, 1960–1970)
- Fred Fredericks (saxophone, 1960–1970)
- Carl Griffiths (saxophone, 1960–1970)
- Count Prince Miller (vocals, 1960–1970)
- Carl Noel (keyboards, 1960–1967)
- Art Regis (Hammond organ, 1967–1969)
- John Roberts (bass guitar, 1968–1970
- Wallace Wilson (guitar, 1960–1970)
- Stewart Blandamer (saxophone, 1970–1972)
- Steve Farr (saxophone, 1970–1972)
- Bill Roberts (guitar, 1970–1972)
- Eddy Spence (keyboards, 1970–1972)
- Kelvin "Kelly" Cantlon (bass, 1970–1972)
- Mick Dolan (drums, 1970–1972)
- Alan Wood (bass, 1973–1977)
- Martin Dale (trumpet, 1971)
- Dave Hopper (guitar, 1973–74)
- Fred Guite (drums, 1973–74)
- Pete Wright (drums, 1974–75)
- Russ Courtenay (drums, 1975–1977)
- Chris Garfield (guitar, 1975–1977)
- Alan Kirk (keyboards, 1975–1977, 1985–1992)
- Pete Gill (drums, 1974–1975)
- John Steele (guitar, 1974–1975)
- Rick Sequeira (keyboards, 1974–1975)
- Andrew Platts (trombone and vocals, 1977–1979)
- Glenn Harland (lead guitar, 1981–1984)
- John Wintony (keyboards, 1981–1984)
- Dave Bussey (drums, 1981–1984)
- John Radcliffe (guitar, 1986)
- David McKendrick (bass, 1981–1982)
- Miffy Smith (keyboards, 1981–1982)
- Chris Turner (bass, 1981–1984)
- Steve Ward (lead guitarist, 1990–1995)
- David Cooke (keyboards, 1990–1995)
- Pat Coleman (drums, 1990–1994)
- Neil Moore (bass and vocals, 1985–1990)
- Mario James (bass, 1986–1992)
- Chris Broadhead (drums, 1986–1990)
- Mike Scrimshaw (bass, 1992)
- Ian "Mo" Gilbert (keyboards, 1996–2011)
- Ben Martin (saxophone, bass, guitar, BV's, 1994–2010)
- George Jeffers (bass 1992–2022)
- Chris Loach (guitar, 1995–2022)
- Jon Trier (piano, 1996–2022)
- Matt Newnham (drums, BV's, 2003–2022)
- Benny Lee (trumpet, 2004–2022)
- Nick Smith (sax, 2010–2022)

== Discography ==
=== Studio albums ===
- The New Religion (1966)
- This Is Jimmy James and the Vagabonds (1968)
- Open Up Your Soul (1968)
- You Don't Stand a Chance If You Can't Dance (1975)
- Now (1976)
- Life (1977)

=== Live albums ===
- Live (1984)

=== Compilation albums ===
- Golden Hour of Jimmy James and the Vagabonds (1979)
- Jimmy James and the Vagabonds (1993)
- I'll Go Where the Music Takes Me - The Best of Jimmy James and the Vagabonds (1994)
- Vagabond King: The Sixties Sides (1997)
- Where Your Music Takes Me (1998)
- Now Is the Time (2014)

=== Singles ===
Year	Song	UK
1966	"Ain't Love Good, Ain't Love Proud"	—
1966	"This Heart of Mine"	—
1966	"I Feel Alright"	—
1966	"I Gotta Dance to Keep from Cryin'"	—
1967	"I Can't Get Back Home to My Baby"	53 (Note: Chart position is from the official UK "Breakers List".)
1967	"No Good to Cry"	—
1968	"Come to Me Softly"	—
1968	"Red Red Wine"	36
1974	"Dancin' to the Music of Love"	—
1974	"Marble & Iron"	—
1974	"You Don't Stand a Chance If You Can't Dance"	—
1975	"Hey Girl"	—
1975	"Whatever Happened to the Love We Knew"	—
1976	"Let's Have Fun"	—
1976	"Do the Funky Conga"	—
1976	"I'll Go Where Your Music Takes Me"	23
1976	"Now Is the Time"	5
1978	"I Can't Stop My Feet from Dancin'"	—
"—" denotes releases that did not chart.

== See also ==
- Biddu
- List of performances on Top of the Pops
