= List of British films of 1976 =

British films released in 1976

A list of films produced in the United Kingdom in 1976 (see 1976 in film):

== 1976 ==
Title	Director	Cast	Genre	Notes
1976
Aces High	Jack Gold	Malcolm McDowell, Christopher Plummer, Simon Ward	World War I	Co-production with France
Adventures of a Taxi Driver	Stanley Long	Barry Evans, Judy Geeson, Adrienne Posta	Sex comedy	
At the Earth's Core	Kevin Connor	Doug McClure, Peter Cushing, Caroline Munro	Fantasy adventure	Co-production with US
The Bawdy Adventures of Tom Jones	Cliff Owen	Nicky Henson, Trevor Howard, Joan Collins	Comedy	
Blue Belle	Massimo Dallamano	Annie Belle, Felicity Devonshire, Maria Rohm	Drama	Co-production with Italy
Bugsy Malone	Alan Parker	Scott Baio, Jodie Foster, John Cassisi	Musical	
Carry On England	Gerald Thomas	Kenneth Connor, Windsor Davies, Judy Geeson	Comedy	
The Cassandra Crossing	George Pan Cosmatos	Richard Harris, Ava Gardner, Sophia Loren	Disaster thriller	International co-production
Confessions of a Driving Instructor	Norman Cohen	Robin Askwith, Antony Booth, Lynda Bellingham	Sex comedy	
The Deadly Females	Donovan Winter	Tracy Reed, Rula Lenska, Bernard Holley	Action	
The Devil's Men	Kostas Karagiannis	Donald Pleasence, Peter Cushing, Luan Peters	Horror	
The Eagle Has Landed	John Sturges	Michael Caine, Donald Sutherland, Jenny Agutter	War thriller	
Emily	Henry Herbert	Koo Stark, Victor Spinetti, Sarah Brackett	Erotic drama	
Escape from the Dark	Charles Jarrott	Alastair Sim, Peter Barkworth, Maurice Colbourne	Drama	Co-production with the US
Exposé	James Kenelm Clarke	Udo Kier, Linda Hayden, Fiona Richmond	Thriller	
Foxtrot	Arturo Ripstein	Peter O'Toole, Charlotte Rampling, Max von Sydow	Drama	Co-production with Mexico
House of Mortal Sin	Pete Walker	Anthony Sharp, Susan Penhaligon, Stephanie Beacham	Horror	
I'm Not Feeling Myself Tonight	Joseph McGrath	James Booth, Sally Faulkner, Ben Aris	Sex comedy	
The Incredible Sarah	Richard Fleischer	Glenda Jackson, Daniel Massey, Yvonne Mitchell	Biopic	
Intimate Games	Tudor Gates	George Baker, Anna Bergman, Ian Hendry	Sex comedy	
It Shouldn't Happen to a Vet	Eric Till	John Alderton, Colin Blakely, Lisa Harrow	Comedy	Entered into the 10th Moscow International Film Festival
Keep It Up Downstairs	Robert Young	Diana Dors, Jack Wild, Françoise Pascal	Sex comedy	
The Likely Lads	Michael Tuchner	Rodney Bewes, James Bolam, Brigit Forsyth	Comedy	Spin-off from TV series Whatever Happened to the Likely Lads?
The Man Who Fell to Earth	Nicolas Roeg	David Bowie, Rip Torn, Candy Clark	Sci fi	Entered into the 26th Berlin International Film Festival
Nickelodeon	Peter Bogdanovich	Ryan O'Neal, Burt Reynolds, Stella Stevens	Comedy	Co-production with the US
Not Now, Comrade	Ray Cooney, Harold Snoad	Leslie Phillips, Windsor Davies, Roy Kinnear	Comedy	
The Omen	Richard Donner	Gregory Peck, Lee Remick, David Warner	Horror	Co-production with the US
The Pink Panther Strikes Again	Blake Edwards	Peter Sellers, Herbert Lom, Lesley-Anne Down	Comedy	Co-production with the US
Pressure	Horace Ové	Herbert Norville, Oscar James, Frank Singuineau	Drama	
Queen Kong	Frank Agrama	Robin Askwith, Rula Lenska, Valerie Leon	Comedy adventure	Co-production with West Germany
The Ritz	Richard Lester	Jack Weston, Rita Moreno, Jerry Stiller	Comedy	Co-production with the US
Robin and Marian	Richard Lester	Sean Connery, Audrey Hepburn, Robert Shaw	Adventure	Co-production with US
The Sailor Who Fell from Grace with the Sea	Lewis John Carlino	Kris Kristofferson, Sarah Miles, Earl Rhodes	Drama	
Schizo	Pete Walker	Lynne Frederick, John Leyton, Stephanie Beacham	Thriller	
Sebastiane	Derek Jarman	Barney James, Richard Warwick, Leonardo Treviglio	Drama	
The Sell Out	Peter Collinson	Oliver Reed, Richard Widmark, Gayle Hunnicutt	Thriller	International co-production
Seven Nights in Japan	Lewis Gilbert	Michael York, Charles Gray, Anne Lonnberg	Comedy drama	Co-production with France
The Seven-Per-Cent Solution	Herbert Ross	Nicol Williamson, Robert Duvall, Alan Arkin, Vanessa Redgrave	Mystery	Co-production with US
The Sexplorer	Derek Ford	Monika Ringwald, Mark Jones, Anna Dawson	Sex comedy	
Shout at the Devil	Peter R. Hunt	Lee Marvin, Roger Moore, Barbara Parkins	Action	
The Slipper and the Rose	Bryan Forbes	Gemma Craven, Richard Chamberlain, Michael Hordern, Margaret Lockwood	Musical	
Spy Story	Lindsay Shonteff	Philip Latham, Don Fellows, Nicholas Parsons	Spy thriller	
To the Devil a Daughter	Peter Sykes	Richard Widmark, Christopher Lee, Honor Blackman	Horror	International co-production
Trial by Combat	Kevin Connor	John Mills, Donald Pleasence, Barbara Hershey	Action	
Under the Doctor	Gerry Poulson	Barry Evans, Liz Fraser, Hilary Pritchard	Sex comedy	
Voyage of the Damned	Stuart Rosenberg	Faye Dunaway, Oskar Werner, James Mason, Orson Welles	Drama	Co-production with the US
Whispering Death	Jürgen Goslar	Christopher Lee, James Faulkner, Sybil Danning	Thriller	Co-production with West Germany

== Documentaries ==
Title	Director	Cast	Genre	Notes
The Memory of Justice	Marcel Ophüls	Karl Dönitz, Albert Speer	World War II documentary	
The Song Remains the Same	Peter Clifton	Led Zeppelin	Concert film	

== Top Films at the British Box Office in 1976 ==
1. Jaws
2. One Flew Over the Cuckoo's Nest
3. The Jungle Book (1967)
4. The Return of the Pink Panther
5. Emmanuelle
6. Rollerball
7. The Omen
8. It Shouldn't Happen to a Vet
9. The Outlaw Josey Wales
10. All the President's Men
11. The Slipper and the Rose
12. Death Race 2000
13. Bambi (1942)
14. Shout at the Devil
15. Tommy
16. Gone with the Wind (1939)
17. The Sound of Music (1965)
18. At the Earth's Core
19. Adventures of a Taxi Driver
20. Barry Lyndon

== See also ==
- 1976 in British music
- 1976 in British radio
- 1976 in British television
- 1976 in the United Kingdom
