= Purdey (The New Avengers) =

Character from The New Avengers TV series

- The New Avengers character
- First appearance: "The Eagle's Nest"
- Last appearance: "Emily"
- Portrayed by: Joanna Lumley

In-universe information
- Gender: Female
- Nationality: British

Purdey is a fictional character in the British TV series The New Avengers played by Joanna Lumley from 1976 to 1977. She was a spy working for British intelligence, partnered with John Steed (Patrick Macnee) and Mike Gambit (Gareth Hunt).

== Character history ==
When Brian Clemens and Albert Fennell first mapped out the characters for The New Avengers - an updating of The Avengers - the female lead character was to have been named Charlie (or Charley), but they eventually decided against using the name. Lumley is credited with suggesting the character be named Purdey, after James Purdey and Sons, a famous shotgun manufacturer. Lumley also chose the character's distinctive short haircut, created by celebrity hairdresser John Frieda.

== Character biography ==
Purdey is a martial arts expert practising savate (which, according to her, she learnt during her time with the Royal Ballet, who let her go for being too tall) and (true to her namesake) an expert markswoman, who is often called upon to use her feminine attributes to distract villains. She is a motorcyclist and expert tap-dancer. Purdey saw Steed as an attractive, yet fatherly figure, and there was also ongoing banter and playful flirting between Purdey and Mike Gambit (although the series never indicated anything more in her relationship with either man).

During the two-year run of the series, no other name was ever given to the character and it was never revealed on screen whether Purdey was the character's first or last name.

== Reception ==
In the British Film Institute's 1996 tribute book, The Avengers, Toby Miller writes: "The New Avengers made a very public and lengthy search for a leading woman. Joan Bakewell compared the eventual choice, Lumley as Purdey, to 'a hockey captain attending a royal garden party'. Richard Afton went far enough to remark that 'sex has taken a long holiday', and Lumley looked back on it from the queer/libertarian-feminist credibility of Absolutely Fabulous to describe her Purdey as 'a huge disappointment, sex-wise'."

Writing of Purdey's debut, Alan Hayes in Avenger World: The Avengers in Our Lives says, "Purdey was certainly no Emma Peel, and her sharp tongue and habit of intentionally making life difficult for Gambit flew in the face of the warm mutual respect between Steed and Peel, so I found that she grated somewhat (my opinion of her would eventually soften considerably)."
