= Now Is the Time (Jimmy James song) =

Single by Jimmy James and the Vagabonds
- B-side: "Want You So Much"
- Released: 1976
- Studio: Pye Studios
- Genre: Disco; pop
- Length: 3:35
- Label: Pye Records
- Songwriter(s): A-side: Biddu; B-side: J. James
- Producer(s): Biddu

"Now Is the Time" is a pop song written in 1976 by Biddu. It was recorded that year by Jimmy James and the Vagabonds. The track appeared in the Top 10 of the UK Singles Chart.

== History ==
The song's recording was made at Pye Studios in London, England, under the tutelage of the song's writer and record producer, Biddu, and was released on Pye Records. The track first appeared in the UK Singles Chart on 17 July 1976 and, in a nine-week chart run, it peaked at number 5. It was the third and final UK chart hit single for the ensemble.

The song's lyrics spoke of environmental issues, urging people to take immediate action. Robin Carmody of Freaky Trigger praised the song as a "heartbreakingly naive" example of "singalong mid-70s pop".

The single was released in many countries including Australia, Belgium, Canada, Germany, Ireland, Italy, New Zealand, and Portugal. In the Netherlands, the song peaked at number 4 in the Dutch Single Top 100.

The song later appeared on a James compilation album, Now Is the Time, issued by Secret Records in 2014. The song has also been included in numerous various artists compilation albums.
