= Heart 'n' Soul =

Heart ‘n’ Soul

Studio album by Tina Charles
- Released: 1977
- Recorded: 1977
- Studio: Nova Sound Studios, London; Marquee Studios, London
- Genre: Pop, Disco
- Label: CBS
- Producer: Biddu

Tina Charles chronology
Rendezvous (US release) (1977)	Heart ‘n’ Soul (1977)	Greatest Hits (1978)

Heart ‘n’ Soul is the fifth album by English singer Tina Charles, who achieved success as a disco artist in the mid to late 1970s. It reached No. 35 in the UK Albums Chart.

== Track listing ==
Side 1

1. "Love Bug/Sweets for My Sweet" (Biddu, Gerry Shury, Roker/Doc Pomus, Mort Shuman) 6:56
2. "I'll Go Where Your Music Takes Me" (Biddu) 4:46
3. "Stop What You're Doing to Me” (Biddu) 3:08
4. "Rendezvous" (Jack Robinson, James Bolden) 3:22

Side 2

1. "Fallin’ in Love in Summertime" (Jack Robinson, James Bolden) 3:17
2. "I Gotta Dance with You" (Chris Rae, Frank McDonald) 3:21
3. "I’ll Be Your Light (In Your Moment of Darkness)" (Biddu) 4:20
4. "Ain’t Gonna Hide my Love" (Bobby Skelton) 3:48
5. "Go" (Biddu) 3:30

== Musicians ==
- Tina Charles - lead and backing vocals
- Chris Rae
- Gerry Shury
- Frank McDonald
- Barry De Souza
- Pip Williams
- Chris Karan
- Frank Ricotti
- Julian Gaillard - strings and brass
- Richard Dodd
- Bones, Biddu – backing vocals

== Production ==
- All tracks arranged by Gerry Shury and Biddu, except "Fallin' in Love in Summertine" and "Go" arranged by Pip Williams and Biddu
- Recording engineer – Richard Dodd
- Tape men – Howard Cross, Mark Chapman, Tim Painter and Steve Parker.
- Album sleeve design – Simon Cantwell, Les May and Roslav Szaybo (CBS Records)
- Cover Photo Brian Cooke (front cover) and Peter Lavery (back cover)

== Charts ==
Chart (1977)	Peak position
Norwegian Albums (VG-lista)	8
Swedish Albums (Sverigetopplistan)	11

== Certifications and sales ==
Region	Certification	Certified units/sales
United Kingdom (BPI)	Silver	60,000^{^}
^{^} Shipments figures based on certification alone.
