= Michael Ball (actor) =

Canadian actor (born 1943)

- Born: 1943 (age 82–83); Ottawa, Ontario, Canada
- Education: Oak Bay High School; National Theatre School of Canada
- Occupation: Actor
- Years active: 1964–2014
- Spouse: Wendy Thatcher

Michael Ball (born 1943) is a Canadian stage and television actor.

== Life and career ==
Ball was born in 1943, in Ottawa, Ontario and raised in Victoria, British Columbia. There he attended the Oak Bay High School, where discovered theatre. From 1961 to 1964, he studied at the National Theatre School of Canada in Montreal, Quebec.

He had a wide career in theatre and television. He has played in many stage productions at the Shaw Festival in Niagara-on-the-Lake, Ontario, Canada.

He lives in Niagara-on-the-Lake.

== Personal life ==
Ball is married to Wendy Thatcher, an actress.

== Filmography ==
=== Television ===
Year	Title	Role	Notes
1964	Shoestring Theatre	Various roles	3 episodes
1971	The Manipulators		Episode: "Nobody's Business"
1972	The Beachcombers		Episode: "Potlatch"
1973	This Land		"Jerry Potts and the 74s" (2 episodes)
1977	The New Avengers	Cope	Episode: "Complex"
1978	For the Record	Larry	Episode: "A Matter of Choice"
1982	The Great Detective		Episode: "Bodies in the Belfry"
1984	Some Honourable Gentlemen		Episode: "The Servant Arthur"
1985	Friends of a Feather		Television film
1986	The Way We Are		Episode: "Every Dog Has His Day"
1989	The Private Capital	Lord Minto	Television film
1989-1993	Street Legal	Various roles	3 episodes
1991	Conspiracy of Silence	Sgt. Thomas Doyle	Episode 2
2011	King	Dr. Robert Taaffe	Episode: "Ahmad Khan"
