= Mike Gambit =

Fictional character in the New Avengers television series

- The New Avengers character
- Gareth Hunt as Mike Gambit
- First appearance: "The Eagle's Nest"
- Last appearance: "Emily"
- Portrayed by: Gareth Hunt

In-universe information
- Gender: Male
- Nationality: British

Mike Gambit (or Michael Gambit) is a fictional character in the British TV series The New Avengers, played by actor Gareth Hunt.

== Overview ==
Gambit was John Steed's first male partner since Drs. David Keel and Martin King in the original The Avengers nearly 15 years earlier. Gareth Hunt was picked for the role at auditions held in late January 1976. His role in the New Avengers team alongside John Steed and Purdey was to be the action man, charming female witnesses, chasing and fighting villains, and protecting his colleagues.

Gambit was a secret agent and former Major in the Parachute Regiment and had a short-lived career as a race car driver.

Gambit was something of a mystery, his past never being addressed within the series other than him running away to sea as a teenager (as Hunt himself did) and that he once took three bullets coming over the Berlin Wall (something he shares with Steed). He lived in an apartment with a Modern architecture design style which is still full of boxes as he'd never bothered to unpack. He was romantically interested in Purdey, often flirting with her during their work together.

== Reception ==
In the British Film Institute's 1996 tribute book, The Avengers, Toby Miller writes: "What of The New Avengers' unwieldy third object, Gambit? Hunt summed up his character's relationship with Purdey as 'based on a promise: one day it will happen.' Some might seem him as the necessary triangulation of mimetic desire: the relationship between the men attains its shape via interaction with her... In effect, Gambit was the viewer brought into the action: the younger man in thrall to Steed and taken with Purdey, he is that most mundane of viewers, the straight white male, finding himself part of the diegesis without any element of fantasy in his character (the Evening News called him 'bovine'). If Tara is the everyday female spectator who is given a part, Gambit is her male equivalent."

In Avenger World: The Avengers in Our Lives, Alan Hayes comments: "I loved Gambit, the perpetual underdog, fiercely loyal, always hopeful that Purdey would return his affection without ever crossing the line, a genuinely good man who quickly became a favourite -- and not bad on the eyes, either! Plus, his suits benefitted from Seventies tailoring, the last decade to remember that men have a waist and to cinch jackets in accordingly."
