= 1976 in the United Kingdom =

Events from the year 1976 in the United Kingdom. This year is notable for the prolonged drought and subsequent heat wave.

== Incumbents ==
- Monarch – Elizabeth II
- Prime Minister - Harold Wilson (Labour) (until 5 April), James Callaghan (Labour) (starting 5 April)

== Events ==
=== January ===
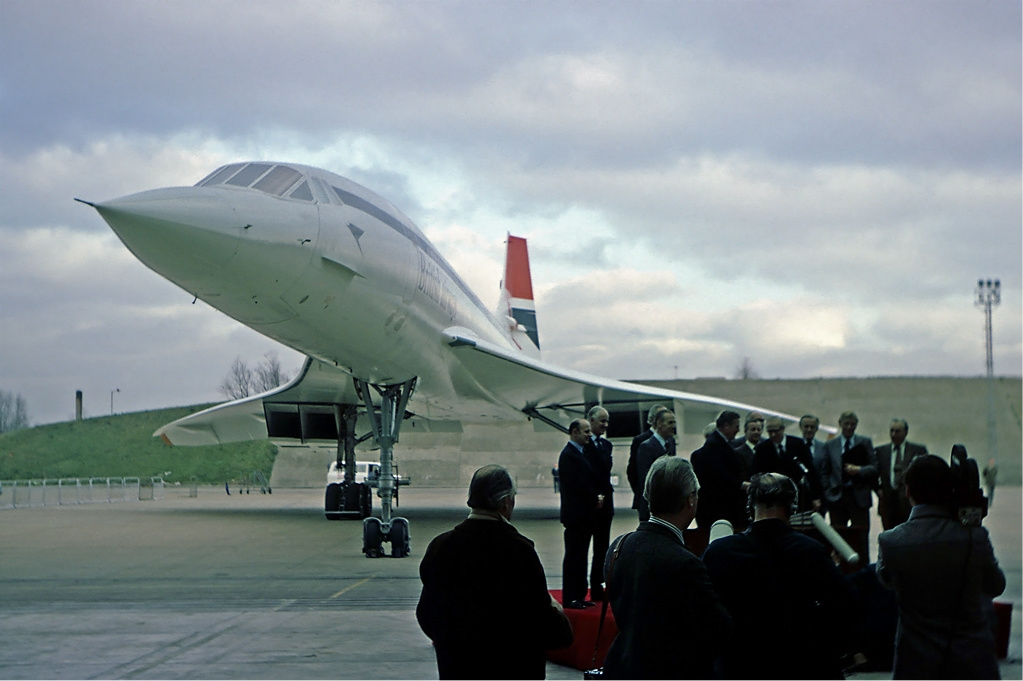
Concorde

- January – UK market launch of the Chrysler Alpine, the British-badged version of the French-built Simca 1307 which was voted European Car of the Year before Christmas. British production of the large five-door family hatchback is planned to commence at the Ryton plant near Coventry later this year.
- 2 January – Hurricane-force winds of up to 105 mph kill 22 people across Britain and cause millions of pounds worth of damage to buildings and vehicles.
- 5 January – Ten Protestant men are killed in the Kingsmill massacre at South Armagh, Northern Ireland, by members of the Provisional Irish Republican Army, using the alias "South Armagh Republican Action Force".
- 7 January – Third Cod War: British and Icelandic ships clash at sea.
- 12 January – The best-selling author of crime fiction Agatha Christie dies aged 85 at her home in Wallingford, Oxfordshire.
- 18 January – The Scottish Labour Party is formed as a breakaway from the UK-wide party.
- 20 January – 42-year-old married woman Emily Jackson is stabbed to death in Leeds; it is revealed that she was a part-time prostitute. Police believe she may have been killed by the same man who murdered Wilma McCann in the city three months previously.
- 21 January – The first commercial Concorde flight takes off from Heathrow Airport for Bahrain.
- 29 January – Twelve Provisional Irish Republican Army bombs explode in London's West End.

=== February ===
- 2 February – The Queen opens the new National Exhibition Centre in Birmingham, situated near the city's airport.
- 4–15 February – Great Britain and Northern Ireland compete at the Winter Olympics in Innsbruck, Austria, and win one gold medal.
- 11 February – John Curry becomes Britain's first gold medalist in skating at the Winter Olympics.
- 19 February – Iceland breaks off diplomatic relations with the UK over the Cod War.

=== March ===
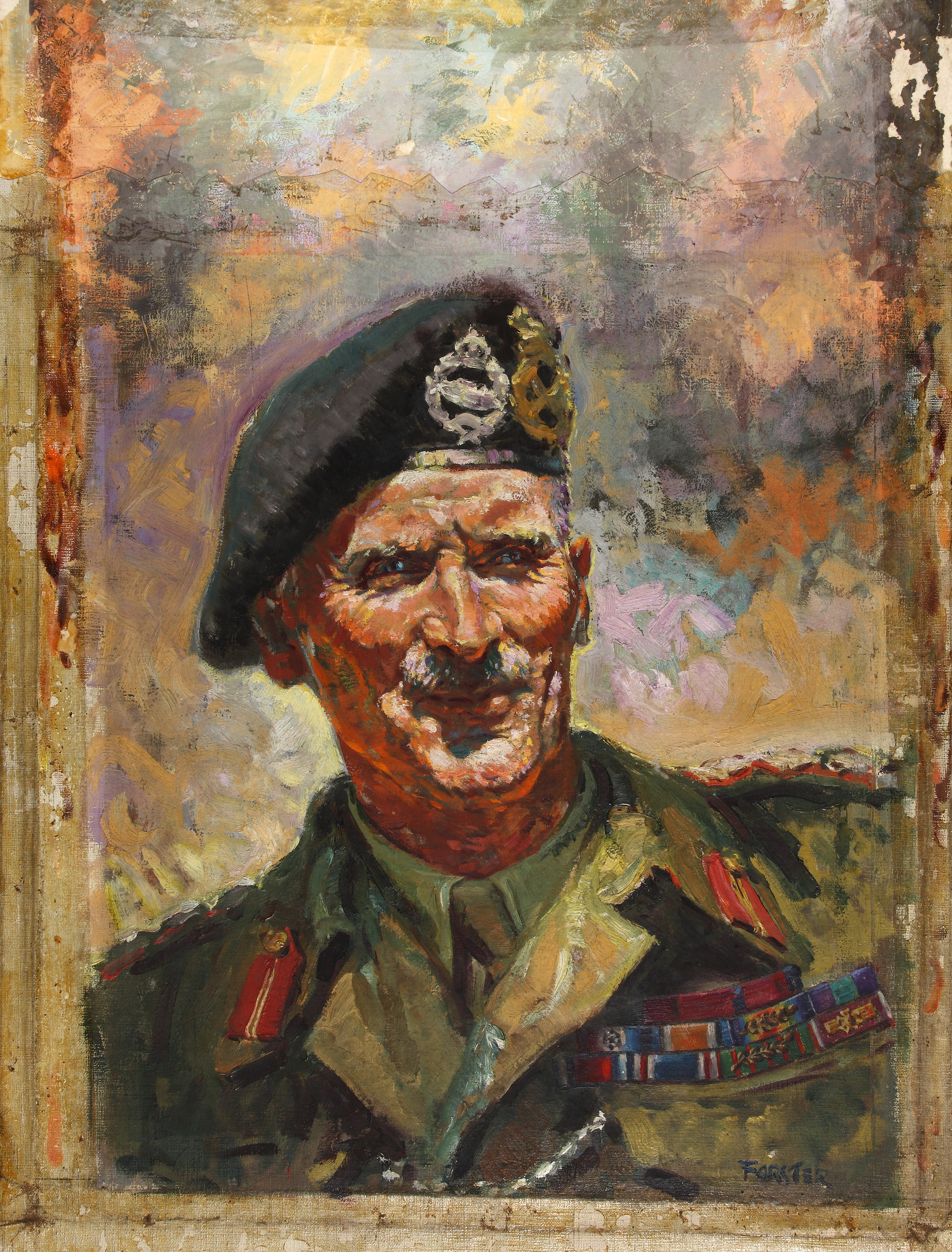
Bernard Montgomery

- March – Production of the Hillman Imp ends after thirteen years. It is due to be replaced next year by a three-door hatchback based on a shortened Avenger floorpan.
- 1 March – Merlyn Rees ends Special Category Status for those sentenced for crimes relating to the civil violence in Northern Ireland.
- 2 March – The Prince of Wales opens Brent Cross Shopping Centre in London.
- 4 March
  - The Northern Ireland Constitutional Convention is formally dissolved in Northern Ireland, resulting in Direct rule over Northern Ireland by the Government of the United Kingdom in London.
  - The Maguire Seven are found guilty in London of possessing explosives for use by the Provisional Irish Republican Army and subsequently jailed for 14 years; their convictions will be overturned in 1991.
  - The 1976 Coventry North West by-election is held.
- 11 March – The Carshalton by-election and the Wirral by-election are held.
- 16 March – Harold Wilson announces his resignation as Prime Minister of the United Kingdom, to take effect on 5 April.
- 19 March – Princess Margaret and Lord Snowdon announce that they are to separate after 16 years of marriage.
- 24 March – General and war hero Bernard Montgomery, Viscount Montgomery dies aged 88 at his home in the village of Isington, Hampshire.
- 26 March – Anita Roddick opens the first branch of The Body Shop, the retail chain for skin care products and cosmetics, in Brighton.

=== April ===
- April – Anne Warburton becomes the first female British ambassador to take up her post (to Denmark).
- 1 April – Punk rock band Buzzcocks play their first gig, in Bolton.
- 2 April – The funeral of Bernard Montgomery is held at St George's Chapel, Windsor Castle prior to burial in Binsted churchyard in Hampshire.
- 3 April – The United Kingdom wins the Eurovision Song Contest for the third time with the song "Save Your Kisses for Me", sung by Brotherhood of Man in The Hague. It remains one of the biggest-selling Eurovision songs ever.
- 5 April – James Callaghan becomes Prime Minister upon the resignation of Harold Wilson, defeating five others in the leadership contest. Callaghan, 64, was previously Foreign Secretary and had served as a chancellor and later Home Secretary under Wilson in government from 1964 until 1970, thus becoming the only person ever to hold all four Great Offices of State.
- 9 April – Young Liberals president Peter Hain is cleared of stealing £490 from a branch of Barclays Bank in 1975.
- 26 April – Comedy actor and Carry On star Sid James, 62, dies on stage at the Sunderland Empire Theatre having suffered a fatal heart attack, which many in the audience initially mistake for part of the show.

=== May ===
- 1 May – Southampton F.C. win the first major trophy of their 91-year history when a goal from Bobby Stokes gives the Football League Second Division club a surprise 1–0 win over Manchester United in the FA Cup Final at Wembley Stadium.
- 4 May – Liverpool F.C. clinch their ninth Football League title with a 3–1 away win over relegated Wolverhampton Wanderers, fighting off a close challenge from underdogs Queen's Park Rangers.
- 6 May – Local council elections produce disappointing results for the Labour Party, who win just 15 seats and lose 829 that they had held, compared to the Conservatives who win 1,044 new seats and lose a mere 22. This setback comes despite the party enjoying a narrow lead in the opinion polls under new leader James Callaghan.
- 9 May – 20-year-old Leeds prostitute Marcella Claxton is badly injured in a hammer attack.
- 10 May – Jeremy Thorpe resigns as leader of the Liberal party.
- 19 May
  - Liverpool F.C. win the UEFA Cup for the second time by completing a 4–3 aggregate victory over the Belgian side Club Brugge K.V.
  - A royal charter is granted to the Chartered Society of Designers.
- 27 May – Harold Wilson's Resignation Honours List is published. It controversially awards honours to many wealthy businessmen, and comes to be known satirically as the "Lavender List".

=== June ===
- June – British Leyland launches its new Rover SD1, a large rear-wheel drive five-door hatchback featuring a 3.5 V8 Buick engine. Smaller engined versions are due next year, when the SD1 completely replaces the Rover P6 and Triumph 2000 ranges.
- 1 June – The UK and Iceland end the Third Cod War, with the UK accepting Iceland's extension of its territorial waters to 200 nautical miles in exchange for defined fishing rights, reducing the agreed take by British trawlers by four fifths.
- 4 June – Sex Pistols at the Lesser Free Trade Hall: Punk rock band the Sex Pistols play the first of two influential concerts in Manchester.
- 14 June – The trial of multiple murderer Donald Neilson, known as the "Black Panther", begins at Oxford Crown Court; he will be convicted and serve the remainder of his life in prison
- 22 June–16 July – 1976 British Isles heat wave reaches its peak with the temperature attaining 80 °F (26.7 °C) every day of this period. For fifteen consecutive days, 23 June–7 July inclusive, it reaches 90 °F (32.2 °C) in London; and five consecutive days – the first being 26 June – see the temperature exceed 95 °F (35 °C).
- 24 June – 1976 Rotherham by-election: Labour retain the seat.
- 28 June – In the heatwave, the temperature reaches 35.6 °C (96.1 °F) in Southampton, the highest recorded for June in the UK until 2026.
- 29 June – The Seychelles become independent of the UK.

=== July ===
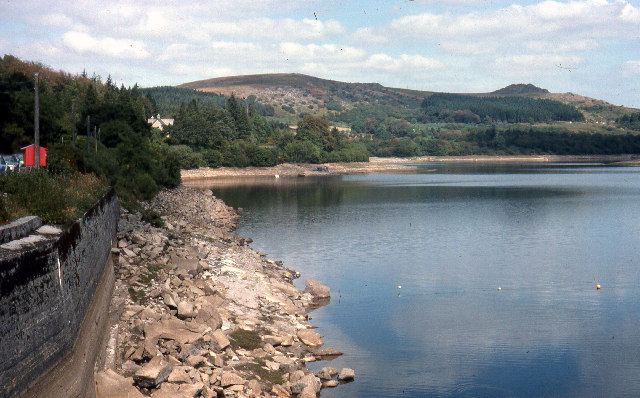
Low water level at Burrator Reservoir in July 1976

- 3 July – The heat wave peaks with temperatures reaching 35.9 °C (96.6 °F) in Cheltenham.
- 4 July – London punk rock band The Clash play their first gig, opening for the Sex Pistols in Sheffield.
- 6 July – London punk rock band The Damned play their first gig, opening for the Sex Pistols.
- 7 July – David Steel is elected as the new leader of the Liberal Party.
- 10 July – Three British and one American mercenaries are shot by firing squad in Angola.
- 14 July – Ford launches a new small three-door hatchback, the Fiesta – its first front-wheel drive transverse engined production model – which is similar in concept to the Vauxhall Chevette and German car maker Volkswagen's new Polo. It will be built in several factories across Europe, including the Dagenham plant in Essex (where 3,000 jobs will be created), and continental sales begin later this year, although it will not go on sale in Britain until January 1977.
- 15 July – 1976 Thurrock by-election: Labour retain the seat.
- 16 July – First of a series of articles by Geraldine Norman in The Times (London) which will expose a number of paintings attributed to Samuel Palmer as the work of Tom Keating, which he does not deny.
- 17 July–1 August – Great Britain and Northern Ireland compete at the Olympics in Montreal, Quebec, Canada, and win 3 gold, 5 silver and 5 bronze medals.
- 21 July – Christopher Ewart-Biggs, new UK ambassador to Ireland, and a civil servant, Judith Cooke, are killed by a Provisional Irish Republican Army landmine at Sandyford, County Dublin.
- 22 July – Dangerous Wild Animals Act requires licences for the keeping of certain animals in captivity.
- 27 July – United Kingdom breaks diplomatic relations with Uganda.
- 29 July – A fire destroys the head of Southend Pier.

=== August ===
- August
  - Drought at its most severe. Parts of South West England go for 45 days with no rain in July and August.
  - Government and Trades Union Congress agree a more severe Stage II one-year limit on pay rises.
- 5 August – The Great Clock of Westminster (or Big Ben) suffers internal damage and stops running for over nine months.
- 6 August – John Stonehouse, the last person to have served as Postmaster General, is sentenced to seven years in jail for fraud.
- 14 August – 10,000 Protestant and Catholic women demonstrate for peace in Northern Ireland.
- 30 August – 100 police officers and 60 carnival-goers are injured during riots at the Notting Hill Carnival.

=== September ===
- September – Chrysler Europe abandons the 69-year-old Hillman marque for its British-made cars and adopts the Chrysler name for the entire range.
- 1 September – Drought measures are introduced in Yorkshire.
- 3 September – Riot at Hull Prison ends.
- 4 September – Peace March in Derry attracts 25,000 people in a call to end violence in Northern Ireland.
- 9 September – The Royal Shakespeare Company opens a memorable production of Shakespeare's Macbeth at The Other Place, Stratford-upon-Avon, with Ian McKellen and Judi Dench in the lead roles, directed by Trevor Nunn.
- 12 September – Portsmouth football club, who were FA Cup winners in 1939 and league champions in 1949 and 1950 but are now in the Football League Third Division, are reported to be on the brink of bankruptcy with huge debts.
- 23 September – A fire on the destroyer HMS Glasgow while being fitted out at Swan Hunter' yard at Wallsend on Tyne kills eight men.
- 29 September – The Ford Cortina Mark IV is launched.

=== October ===
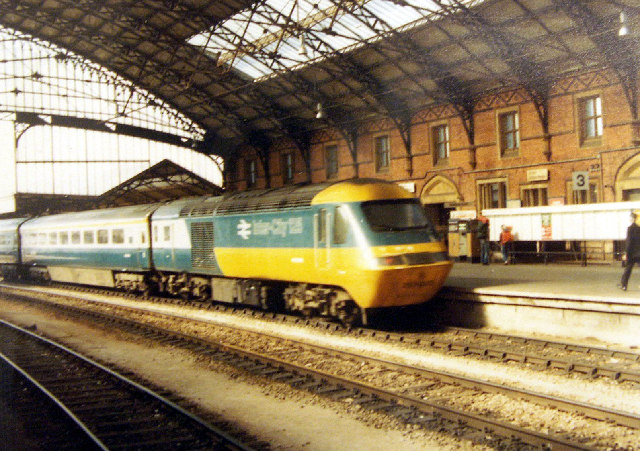
InterCity 125

- 4 October – The InterCity 125 high-speed train is introduced into passenger service on British Rail, initially London Paddington, Bristol and Cardiff; the units will still be in front-line service on these routes until withdrawn from them 43 years later (and will continue in service elsewhere).
- 15 October – Two members of the Ulster Defence Regiment are jailed for 35 years for murder of the members of the Republic of Ireland cabaret performers Miami Showband.
- 22 October – The Damned release "New Rose", the first single marketed as "punk rock".
- 24 October – Racing driver James Hunt becomes Formula One world champion.
- 25 October – Opening of the Royal National Theatre on the South Bank in London, in premises designed by Sir Denys Lasdun.
- 27 October – Keith Joseph delivers an influential policy speech "Monetarism is Not Enough", published by the Centre for Policy Studies.
- 29 October – Opening of Selby Coalfield.

=== November ===
- 4 November - Parliamentary by-elections are held in Newcastle-upon-Tyne Central, Walsall North and Workington.
- 12 November – Disappearance of Renee MacRae and her 3-year-old son Andrew from Inverness in Scotland; this becomes Britain's longest-running missing persons case.
- 16 November – The seven perpetrators of an £8,000,000 van robbery at the Bank of America in Mayfair are sentenced to a total of 100 years in jail.
- 22 November – Education Act gives the Secretary of State for Education the power to ask local education authorities to plan for non-selective (i.e. comprehensive) secondary education, put into effect by DES Circulars 11/76 and 12/76 (25 November).

=== December ===
- 1 December – Punk rock band the Sex Pistols achieve public notoriety as they say several swear words live on Bill Grundy's ITV show, following the release of their debut single Anarchy in the U.K. on 26 November; Grundy is suspended for inciting them.
- 2 December – 1976 Cambridge by-election: the Conservatives retain the seat.
- 4 December – The notable composer Benjamin Britten (granted a life peerage in July) dies of heart failure aged 63 at his home in Aldeburgh, Suffolk. On 7 December his funeral takes place at St Peter and St Paul's Church, Aldeburgh, where he is laid to rest.
- 10 December – Betty Williams and Mairead Corrigan win the Nobel Peace Prize.
- 15 December – Denis Healey announces to Parliament that he has successfully negotiated a £2,300,000,000 loan for Britain from the International Monetary Fund on condition that £2,500,000,000 is cut from public expenditure; the NHS, education and social benefit sectors are not affected by these cuts.

=== Undated ===
- Inflation stands at 16.5% – lower than last year's level, but still one of the highest since records began in 1750. However, at one stage during this year inflation exceeds 24%.
- Opening of Rutland Water, the largest reservoir in England by surface area (1,212 hectares (2,995 acres)).
- First purpose-built (Thai style) Buddhist temple built in Britain, the Wat Buddhapadipa in Wimbledon, London.
- Cadbury launches the Double Decker chocolate bar.

== Publications ==
- Kingsley Amis's novel The Alteration.
- Jeffrey Archer's first novel Not a Penny More, Not a Penny Less.
- Agatha Christie's last published novel, the final Miss Marple story Sleeping Murder (posthumous).
- Richard Dawkins' book The Selfish Gene.
- Terry Pratchett's novel The Dark Side of the Sun.

== Births ==
- 19 January – Marsha Thomason, actress
- 21 January – Emma Bunton, pop singer (Spice Girls)
- 2 February – James Hickman, swimmer
- 4 February – Stevie Knight, wrestler and promoter
- 8 February – Abi Titmuss, television presenter and model
- 10 February – Keeley Hawes, actress
- 12 February – Jenni Falconer, radio and television presenter
- 20 February – Ed Graham, drummer (The Darkness)
- 29 February – Zoë Baker, UK-New Zealand swimmer and coach
- 22 March – Victoria Atkins, politician
- 23 March – Chris Hoy, Olympic gold medal-winning cyclist
- 10 April – Clare Buckfield, actress
- 15 April – Steve Williams, rower
- 18 April – Sean Maguire, actor and singer
- 19 April – Trudy Harrison, politician
- 29 April – Ana Boulter, television presenter
- 8 May – Ian "H" Watkins, pop singer
- 14 May – Martine McCutcheon, actress and singer
- 21 May – Stuart Bingham, snooker player
- 5 June – Cherilyn Mackrory, politician
- 6 June
  - Ross Noble, comedian
  - Geoff Rowley, skateboarder and businessman
- 13 June – Jason "J" Brown, pop musician (5ive)
- 14 June – Alan Carr, comedian and broadcaster
- 16 June – Cian Ciaran, musician
- 23 June – Helen Whately, politician
- 25 June
  - Iestyn Harris, rugby player
  - Gavin Williamson, politician
- 28 June – Lorraine Stanley, actress
- 1 July – Kellie Bright, actress
- 6 July – Chris Philp, politician
- 7 July – Natasha Collins, actress and model (died 2008)
- 8 July – Ellen MacArthur, yachtswoman
- 12 July – Anna Friel, actress
- 13 July
  - Emma Bonney, billiards and snooker player
  - Lisa Riley, actress and television presenter
- 14 July – Geraint Jones, cricketer
- 19 July – Benedict Cumberbatch, English actor
- 27 July – Demis Hassabis, AI researcher
- 9 August
  - Aled Haydn-Jones, radio producer
  - Rhona Mitra, actress
- 10 August – Sam Gyimah, politician
- 13 August – Roddy Woomble, musician
- 15 August – Robert Macfarlane, writer
- 1 September – Clare Connor, cricketer
- 6 September
  - Ian Ashbee, footballer
  - Naomie Harris, actress
- 11 September – Neil Willey, backstroke swimmer
- 15 September - Paul Thomson, drummer (Franz Ferdinand)
- 16 September – Tina Barrett, singer (S Club 7)
- 6 October – Lady Victoria Hervey, model and socialite
- 13 October – Jennie Bimson, field hockey player
- 18 October – Emma Hayes, football manager
- 23 October – Cat Deeley, television presenter
- 25 October – Steve Jones, footballer
- 29 October – Stephen Craigan, footballer
- 3 November – Ian Gillespie, former cricketer
- 7 November – Andrew Davies, cricketer
- 13 November – Kelly Sotherton, heptathlete, long jumper and relay runner
- 8 December – Dominic Monaghan, actor
- 12 December – Dan Hawkins, rock guitarist (The Darkness)
- 17 December – Andrew Simpson, competition sailor (died 2013)
- 18 December – Jaime King, breaststroke swimmer
- 20 December – Adam Powell, game designer
- date unknown
  - Steffan Cravos, Welsh rap musician
  - Neil Maskell, actor
  - Amanda Pritchard, health service executive
  - Tai Shani, artist

== Deaths ==
- 5 January – Mal Evans, Beatles' former roadie and patron of Badfinger (born 1935)
- 12 January – Agatha Christie, detective fiction writer (born 1890)
- 13 January – Margaret Leighton, actress (born 1922)
- 11 February – Charlie Naughton, actor (born 1886)
- 12 February – John Lewis, Marxist philosopher (born 1889)
- 23 February – L. S. Lowry, painter (born 1887)
- 19 March – Paul Kossoff, rock guitarist (Free) (born 1950)
- 24 March
  - Bernard Montgomery, field marshal (born 1887)
  - E. H. Shepard, artist and book illustrator (born 1879)
- 22 April – Colin MacInnes, novelist (born 1914)
- 26 April – Sid James, actor and comedian (born 1913 in South Africa)
- 28 April – Richard Hughes, novelist (born 1900)
- 7 May
  - George Curzon, actor (born 1898)
  - Alison Uttley, writer (born 1884)
- 14 May – Keith Relf, musician (The Yardbirds) (born 1943)
- 6 June – David Jacobs, athlete (born 1888)
- 9 June – Dame Sybil Thorndike, actress (born 1882)
- 11 June – Amy Gentry, rower (born 1903)
- 28 June – Sir Stanley Baker, actor (born 1928)
- 5 July – Frank Bellamy, comics artist (born 1917)
- 13 July – Frederick Hawksworth, railway mechanical engineer (born 1884)
- 21 July – Christopher Ewart-Biggs, diplomat, Ambassador to Ireland (murdered by IRA) (born 1921)
- 22 July – Sir Mortimer Wheeler, archaeologist (born 1890)
- 12 August – Tom Driberg, journalist ("William Hickey") and politician (born 1905)
- 13 August – Robert Stopford, former Bishop of London (born 1901)
- 19 August – Alastair Sim, actor (born 1900)
- 30 August – David Rees-Williams, 1st Baron Ogmore, politician (born 1903)
- 1 September – Percy Shaw, inventor (born 1890)
- 5 September – Arthur Gilligan, cricketer (born 1894)
- 1 October – George Stacey Hodson, Royal Air Force officer (born 1899)
- 14 October – Dame Edith Evans, actress (born 1888)
- 20 November – Martin D'Arcy, Catholic intellectual (born 1888)
- 4 December – Benjamin Britten, composer (born 1913)

== See also ==
- List of British films of 1976
