= The New Avengers (TV series) =

British TV drama series (1976–1977)

- Series title screenshot
- Genre: Action; Spy fiction
- Created by: Brian Clemens, Albert Fennell
- Based on: The Avengers by Sydney Newman
- Starring: Patrick Macnee; Gareth Hunt; Joanna Lumley
- Theme music composer: Laurie Johnson
- Countries of origin: United Kingdom; Canada; France
- Original language: English
- No. of series: 2
- No. of episodes: 26

Production
- Producer: Brian Clemens
- Running time: 50 minutes per episode
- Production companies: The Avengers (Film and TV) Enterprises Ltd

Original release
- Network: ITV
- Release: 22 October 1976 – 17 December 1977

Related
- The Avengers; Escapade

The New Avengers is a secret agent action television series produced during 1976 and 1977. It is a sequel to the 1960s series The Avengers and was developed by original series producers Albert Fennell and Brian Clemens.

The series was produced by The Avengers (Film and TV) Enterprises Ltd for the ITV network, cost £125,000 per episode to produce at Pinewood Studios, and was seen in 120 countries.

A joint United Kingdom-France-Canada production, the series picks up the adventures of John Steed (again played by Patrick Macnee) as he and his team of "Avengers" fight evil plots and world domination. Whereas in the original series Steed had almost always been partnered with a woman, in the new series he had two partners: Mike Gambit (Gareth Hunt), a top agent, crack marksman and trained martial artist, and Purdey (Joanna Lumley), a former trainee with The Royal Ballet (to which she ascribed the high-kicking skills she frequently used in the series) who was an amalgam of many of the best talents from Steed's female partners in The Avengers.

== Overview ==
As he was for most of the original Avengers series, John Steed is once again acting without a direct superior—in many ways his character takes on the duties of "Mother" from the Tara King era of that series. Steed is seen to be the mentor to Mike Gambit and Purdey, taking on a paternal role towards them (especially in the episode "Hostage"). Gambit is the athletic action hero, while Purdey incorporates the wit and fighting skills of her predecessors. The verbal interplay between Gambit and Purdey, with her humorously keeping his romantic advances at bay, harks back to the Steed/Cathy Gale era of The Avengers.

One reason for the addition of Gambit was the question of whether Macnee, aged 53 when the series began production, could handle the potential stuntwork and action scenes. Macnee was able to increase his role's visibility as the series progressed, losing weight to improve his athleticism and "keep up" with his new partners.

The first series featured several episodes using science fiction themes similar to those of the classic "Emma Peel" Avengers era. The new trio had to deal with suspended animation ("The Eagle's Nest"), biological warfare ("The Midas Touch"), robotics ("The Last of The Cybernauts?"), mind transfer ("Three-Handed Game") and even a giant rat ("Gnaws", a title patterned after the hit movie Jaws). Second series episodes featured science fiction elements, such as the artificially-intelligent supercomputer of "Complex", the Russian soldiers revived from suspended animation in "K is for Kill", the submersible Russian community in "Forward Base" and the superhumans of "The Gladiators". Other episodes of that season dealt with more realistic plots.

The Avengers and The New Avengers scriptwriter Dennis Spooner said that at the end of its run The Avengers had gone as far as it could in terms of parody. For this reason, producer Brian Clemens intentionally aimed for real stories and straight, Len Deighton-type spy stories in The New Avengers. Spooner explained that "it's no good saying 'I don't like The New Avengers so much, because it wasn't like the old show'-because it never could have been. We did everything – we did the kitchen sink! – and there was no way of going back on it". When reminded of his The New Avengers script "Gnaws", Spooner admitted that "well, yes, towards the end we relaxed a bit!" Some of the storylines used in the series were recycled from earlier scripts penned by Clemens or Spooner from other series. "Medium Rare" was based on the episode "Murder in Mind" of the British series Thriller, and "Gnaws" was based on the Thunderbirds story "Attack of the Alligators!"

An attempt to get Diana Rigg to appear as Emma Peel in the new series was unsuccessful, although old footage of her on the phone from two 1960s episodes of The Avengers ("The Winged Avenger" and "The Hidden Tiger") was used to allow the character to make a cameo appearance in the episode "K Is For Kill Part One: The Tiger Awakes": Sue Lloyd provided the voice of Mrs Peel for these sequences. Ian Hendry, who in the early 1960s had played Steed's original partner, David Keel, also guest-starred in one episode, "To Catch A Rat", playing a different role. "Obsession" features two of the stars of the Brian Clemens/Albert Fennell British crime-fighting action series The Professionals: Martin Shaw and Lewis Collins.

Two series totalling 26 episodes were produced, which were aired on CBS in the United States, CTV in Canada, ITV in Britain, RTÉ in Ireland, ABC in Australia, TF1 in France, TVE1 in Spain and in syndication elsewhere.

Laurie Johnson, who had composed the theme used from 1965 onward for the original Avengers series, returned to compose a new, updated theme for the revival, although it begins with the same fanfare as the original.

In order to complete the planned 26 episodes, finance was sought from other sources. Production company Nielsen Ferns came on board but was understandably keen to promote its home country, so the final four stories, titled The New Avengers in Canada on the caption card preceding each episode, saw the action move to Toronto, Ontario (with scenes for the episode "Forward Base" shot at Ward's Island). Brian Clemens was by this time heavily committed to working on The Professionals for LWT, and control of the series passed to a largely local crew. The results attracted heavy criticism both from fans and from Clemens himself.

The financial problems continued and plans for a third series were abandoned. Subsequently, however, strong sales to many countries—notably CBS in the United States—saw two attempts to revive the show (in 1979 and 1980), though co-financing arrangements proved impossible to agree upon.

Brian Clemens was invited to write a pilot for Quinn Martin's QM Productions. Entitled Escapade, the pilot episode was broadcast on CBS in 1978, and starred Granville Van Dusen and Morgan Fairchild as Joshua and Suzy – Gambit and Purdey equivalents. It was not picked up as a series.

In 1994, Joanna Lumley and Gareth Hunt publicised the launch of the series on domestic videocassette. Sales were stronger than expected, prompting Brian Clemens to consider reuniting the two actors in a "spin-off" series. Although both were keen to participate and a script was written, plans stalled at an early stage for undisclosed reasons.

In 1995/6, the series was picked up by the BBC for a repeat run (Joanna Lumley subsequently claimed that this is the only screening for which she received repeat fees). At the time, French company Canal Plus held transmission prints for the series, but upon delivery the BBC considered that those for several early episodes were not of "broadcast quality". As a result, the final four episodes were actually the first to be screened, whilst better prints of the others were made up. Nevertheless, notable variations in picture and audio quality across the series remained, with the episodes not receiving a full restoration and remaster until UHD and Blu-ray release in 2025.

The series began a repeat run on BBC Four on 13 November 2008. This was the first time the series had been networked since its screening by the BBC in 1995. UK channel ITV4 started broadcasting the first series in January 2013.

The series was rerun sequentially on ITV4 in September 2014, starting with "The Eagle's Nest". As with other series such as The Professionals and Batman, episodes were shown in the evening slot and then repeated the morning after.

In July 2018, British freeview channel True Entertainment began a rerun of the entire series. Previously they had also shown the original Avengers. On 4 January 2021, True Entertainment's replacement channel Sony Channel began a repeat showing of The New Avengers beginning with series 1, episode 1, "The Eagle's Nest" (whilst the rights to show the original Avengers TV series in 2021 are with ITV).

On 25 May 2021, Narrative Capital's acquisition of Sony's channels saw The Sony Channel rebranded as Great! TV in the UK.

Mid-September into mid-October 2024 saw the weeknight re-broadcast in quick succession of both series of The New Avengers on Great TV although not in actual episode order, instead, somewhat haphazardly but still to completion of both 13 episode seasons with the final episode set for broadcast being Series 2, Episode 11 'The Gladiators' on Monday 14th October 2024, with each episode of each series broadcast at 2100.

== Episodes ==
Airdates given here are for a transmission on ATV (Midlands); other ITV regions' air dates vary.

=== Series 1 (1976–77) ===
No. overall	No. in series	Title	Original release date	Prod. code
1	1	"The Eagle's Nest"	22 October 1976	A01
A neo-Nazi cult seeks to resurrect Adolf Hitler. Guest stars: Peter Cushing, Derek Farr, Frank Gatliff, Trevor Baxter, Jerold Wells, Sydney Bromley, Brian Anthony, Peter Porteous
2	2	"House of Cards"	29 October 1976	A03
The trio keep watch on a defector, but an enemy agent activates 13 sleeper agents, known as "The House of Cards", to kill him. Guest stars: Peter Jeffrey, Mark Burns, Annette Andre, Jeremy Wilkin, Frank Thornton, Lyndon Brook, Derek Francis, Gordon Sterne, Eva Rueber-Staier, Anthony Bailey
3	3	"The Last of the Cybernauts?"	5 November 1976	A04
Disfigured double-agent Felix Kane forces a scientist to restart the maintenance of Cybernaut robots. Guest stars: Robert Lang, Oscar Quitak, Basil Hoskins, Robert Gillespie, Gwen Taylor, Ray Armstrong, Martin Fisk
4	4	"The Midas Touch"	12 November 1976	A02
A professor finds a host to carry a plethora of diseases, code-naming them "Midas", to sell as a biological weapon. Guest stars: John Carson, Ronald Lacey, Ed Devereaux, Pik-Sen Lim, Chris Tranchell, David Swift, Geoffrey Bateman, Tim Condren
5	5	"Cat Amongst the Pigeons"	19 November 1976	A06
Guest stars: Vladek Sheybal, Basil Dignam, Peter Copley, Kevin Stoney, Hugh Walters, Brian Jackson, Gordon Rollings, Andy Bradford
6	6	"Target"	26 November 1976	A07
Guest stars: Keith Barron, Frederick Jaeger, Robert Beatty, Bruce Purchase, Roy Boyd, Deep Roy, John Paul, Malcolm Stoddard
7	7	"To Catch a Rat"	3 December 1976	A05
Guest stars: Ian Hendry, Barry Jackson, Edward Judd, Jo Kendall, Dallas Cavell
8	8	"The Tale of the Big Why"	10 December 1976	A09
Guest stars: Derek Waring, Jenny Runacre, Roy Marsden, George A. Cooper, Geoffrey Toone, Gary Waldhorn
9	9	"Faces"	17 December 1976	A08
Guest stars: David de Keyser, Edward Petherbridge, Richard Leech, Michael Sheard, Donald Hewlett, J. G. Devlin, Neil Hallett, David Webb
10	10	"Gnaws"	21 December 1976	A12
Guest stars: Julian Holloway, Peter Cellier, Jeremy Young, Patrick Malahide, W. Morgan Sheppard, Keith Marsh, Keith Alexander
11	11	"Dirtier by the Dozen"	7 January 1977	A13
Guest stars: John Castle, Shaun Curry, Alun Armstrong, Michael Barrington, Brian Croucher, Stephen Moore, John Forbes-Robertson, David Purcell
12	12	"Sleeper"	14 January 1977	A11
Guest stars: Keith Buckley, Sara Kestelman, Prentis Hancock, Mark Jones, David Schofield
13	13	"Three-Handed Game"	21 January 1977	A10
Guest stars: Stephen Greif, Tony Vogel, David Wood, Ronald Leigh-Hunt, Annie Lambert, John Paul, Hugh Morton

=== Series 2 (1977) ===
No. overall	No. in series	Title	Original release date	Prod. code
14	1	"Dead Men Are Dangerous"	9 September 1977	B03
Guest stars: Clive Revill, Gabrielle Drake, Trevor Adams, Roger Avon, Michael Turner
15	2	"Angels of Death"	16 September 1977	B05
Guest stars: Dinsdale Landen, Terence Alexander, Michael Latimer, Caroline Munro, Pamela Stephenson, Lindsay Duncan, Annette Lynton, Moira Foot, Anthony Bailey
16	3	"Medium Rare"	23 September 1977	B04
Guest stars: Jeremy Wilkin, Jon Finch, Sue Holderness, Neil Hallett, Maurice O'Connell
17	4	"The Lion and the Unicorn"	30 September 1977	B07
Guest stars: Maurice Marsac, Gerald Sim
18	5	"Obsession"	7 October 1977	B06
Guest stars: Martin Shaw, Lewis Collins, Roy Purcell, Tommy Boyle
19	6	"Trap"	14 October 1977	B02
Guest stars: Ferdy Mayne, Robert Rietti, Stuart Damon, Larry Lamb, Bruce Boa, Kristopher Kum
20	7	"Hostage"	21 October 1977	B01
Guest stars: William Franklyn, Simon Oates, Michael Culver, Anna Palk, Barry Stanton, Richard Ireson
21	8	"K Is for Kill Part One: The Tiger Awakes"	28 October 1977	B08
Guest stars: Pierre Vernier, Diana Rigg (archival footage), Kenneth Watson, Tony Then
22	9	"K Is for Kill Part Two: Tiger by the Tail"	4 November 1977	B09
Steed and Co. meet a killer who is older than his father. Guest star: Pierre Vernier
23	10	"Complex"	11 November 1977	B10
Guest stars: Cec Linder, Harvey Atkin, Jan Rubeš, Vlasta Vrána, Michael Ball
24	11	"Forward Base"	18 November 1977	B11
Guest stars: Jack Creley, Marilyn Lightstone, Maurice Good, David Calderisi, August Schellenberg, Les Rubie
25	12	"The Gladiators"	25 November 1977	B12
Guest stars: Louis Zorich, Neil Vipond, George Chuvalo
26	13	"Emily"	17 December 1977	B13
An enemy agent whom the trio are searching for in Canada leaves evidence of their identity, a handprint, on the roof of the titular car. Getting said evidence to forensics leads to one turn of errors after another. Guest stars: Jane Mallett, Leslie Carlson, Peter Aykroyd, Richard M. Davidson, Jack Duffy, Ed McNamara

All prints of the final four episodes of series 2 begin with a sting of the theme tune over a cue card, which reads The New Avengers in Canada.

"K Is for Kill" is titled "The Dragon Awakes" ("Der Drache erwacht") in Germany and "The Long Sleep" ("Le Long Sommeil") in France.

== Spin-offs ==
=== Novels ===
The New Avengers spawned a series of novels based on episode scripts. Only three were published in the US:

- House of Cards, Peter Cave, 1976
- The Eagle's Nest, John Carter, 1976 (“The Eagle's Nest” and “The Midas Touch”)
- To Catch a Rat, Walter Harris, 1977
- Fighting Men, Justin Cartwright, 1977 (“Dirtier by the Dozen”)
- The Cybernauts, Cave, 1977 (“The Last of the Cybernauts”)
- Hostage, Cave, 1977

=== Comics ===
Two hardback annuals of The New Avengers were also published in the UK, containing self-contained comic strip adventures, short fiction and features:

- The New Avengers Annual (1977), Brown Watson – comic strips Fangs for the Memory, drawn by John Bolton (uncredited); Hypno-twist, drawn by John Bolton (signed).
- The New Avengers Annual (1978), Brown Watson – comic strips Midas Touch, drawn by Pierre Le Goff; The Cybernauts, drawn by Pierre Le Goff.

== Home release ==
The complete series was made available on DVD in both the UK and North America. A&E Home Video, under license from StudioCanal International, released the Region 1 editions of series 1 in 2003 and series 2 in 2004, while Optimum/Studio Canal released both series as a single set in 2006.

In November 2025, StudioCanal released remastered versions of both series in a complete region-free box set, available in UHD, Blu-ray or DVD, with the episodes fully restored from the 35 mm original camera negatives in 4K resolution and various new special features.
