= Gareth Hunt =

British actor (1942–2007)

- Hunt as Mike Gambit
- Born: Alan Leonard Hunt; 7 February 1942; Battersea, London, England
- Died: 14 March 2007 (aged 65); Redhill, Surrey, England
- Occupation: Actor

Alan Leonard Hunt (7 February 1942 – 14 March 2007), known as Gareth Hunt, was a British television actor best remembered for playing footman Frederick Norton in Upstairs, Downstairs and Mike Gambit in The New Avengers.

== Early life ==
Alan Leonard Hunt was born in Battersea, London, in 1942. His father was killed in the Second World War when he was two years old, and he was brought up by his mother, Doris, and his stepfather. At the age of 15, he joined the Merchant Navy. After six years, he jumped ship in New Zealand and worked in a car plant for a year before he was caught and served three months in a military prison.

Hunt was then deported back to Britain, and while taking a BBC design course he held a variety of jobs, including stagehand, road digger, butcher's assistant and door-to-door salesman. Having had an interest in acting since his early years, he subsequently trained at the Webber Douglas Academy of Dramatic Art. Following that, he did rep across the United Kingdom and joined the Royal Shakespeare Company and National Theatre in the early 1970s. Among the many stage productions he appeared in were Twelfth Night, Oh, What a Lovely War! and West Side Story.

== Career ==
Hunt began his television career in 1968, playing Private Kitson in one episode of the UK series Frontier. In 1972, he played a policeman in For the Love of Ada, the same year he appeared in A Family at War and The Organisation. In 1974, he had roles in the Doctor Who story Planet of the Spiders and Bless This House, and the following year played Thomas Woolner in The Love School.

In 1974, Hunt appeared in the Upstairs, Downstairs episode "Missing Believed Killed" as Trooper Norton, batman to James Bellamy. The character was a minor one; however, his performance led producers John Hawkesworth and Alfred Shaughnessy to ask him to come back as a regular for the fifth series in 1975. Hunt continued playing Frederick Norton, who had by now become the footman, until the eleventh episode of the fifth series, "Alberto".

In 1975, he made appearances in The Hanged Man, Softly, Softly and Space: 1999.

In 1976, the year after leaving Upstairs, Downstairs, Hunt starred alongside Joanna Lumley and Patrick Macnee in The New Avengers. The show's producers said Hunt was cast because of his part in Upstairs, Downstairs. He played secret agent Mike Gambit and starred in the show until its end after two series in December 1977.

In 1979 he appeared in the films Licensed to Love and Kill, in which he portrayed secret agent Charles Bind, and The World Is Full of Married Men. During the late 1970s and 1980s Hunt made appearances in Sunday Night Thriller, Minder and Hammer House of Mystery and Suspense. He appeared alongside Julia McKenzie in That Beryl Marston...! in 1981, and also in the films Funny Money (1983) and Bloodbath at the House of Death (1984) as well as the children's film Gabrielle and the Doodleman. In 1988 he played many parts in the Pet Shop Boys' film It Couldn't Happen Here.

Hunt starred in a series of television adverts for the instant coffee brand Nescafé in the 1980s, with a trademark move: to shake his closed hand then open it, to reveal coffee beans, and smell the aroma. He also starred in a Territorial Army recruitment film titled One of Us, set in the early 1980s. In it, he plays a Corporal Barrett; the story concerns a small anti-tank platoon from the 3rd Battalion (V) Royal Regiment of Wales going to Germany on exercises. The unit in question was located in the village of Pentre, Rhondda Fawr, South Wales. Like many other TA units it no longer exists.

From 1992 to 1993 Hunt had a leading role in the sitcom Side by Side.

Hunt continued to have minor roles in many television programmes in the 1990s and 2000s, with appearances in The New Adventures of Robin Hood, Harry and the Wrinklies, Absolute Power (as himself), New Tricks, Sooty & Co., Powers and Doctors. He appeared in the TV movie The Incredible Adventures of Marco Polo and the films Fierce Creatures (1997), Parting Shots (1998) and The Riddle (2007), and in 2001 played Ritchie Stringer, a crime boss who was an unlikely suspect in the shooting of Phil Mitchell, in EastEnders. He had a main role in the short-lived soap opera Night and Day in 2001.

For a brief time he abandoned acting and started a project called Interactive Casting Universal, a computer system that presented actors' details and showreels.

Hunt suffered a heart attack in December 1999, and withdrew from a pantomime in Malvern. In July 2002, he collapsed while performing on stage in Bournemouth.

== Death ==
Hunt died of pancreatic cancer, from which he had suffered for two years, on 14 March 2007 at the age of 65, at his home in Redhill, Surrey. He was married three times and had a son by each marriage. His last wife, Amanda, is the mother of his youngest son, Jason.

== Partial filmography ==
- For the Love of Ada (1972) - Policeman
- The World Is Full of Married Men (1979) - Jay Grossman
- Licensed to Love and Kill (1979) - Charles Bind
- Funny Money (1983) - Keith Banks
- Bloodbath at the House of Death (1984) - Elliot Broome
- Gabrielle and the Doodleman (1984) - Mike / King / Baron Hardup
- A Hazard of hearts (1987) - Joker the Highwayman
- It Couldn't Happen Here (1987) - Uncle Dredge / postcard seller / ventriloquist
- A Chorus of Disapproval (1989) - Ian Hubbard
- The Lady and the Highwayman (1989) - Coachman
- Riders (1993) - Sports commentator
- Fierce Creatures (1997) - Inspector Masefield
- The Incredible Adventures of Marco Polo (1998) - Grand Master
- Parting Shots (1998) - Inspector Bass
- The Riddle (2007) - Roy McBride (final film role)
- EastEnders (2001) - Ritchie Stringer - 2 episodes
