= Ian Gillespie (cricketer) =

English cricketer

Personal information
- Full name: Ian Gillespie
- Born: 3 November 1976 (age 50); Shrewsbury, Shropshire, England
- Batting: Right-handed
- Bowling: Right-arm fast-medium

Domestic team information
- Years: Team
- 2002–2003: Shropshire

Career statistics
Competition	List A
Matches	1
Runs scored	26
Batting average	–
100s/50s	–/–
Top score	26*
Balls bowled	24
Wickets	–
Bowling average	–
5 wickets in innings	–
10 wickets in match	–
Best bowling	–
Catches/stumpings	–/–
- Source: Cricinfo, 2 July 2011

Ian Gillespie (born 3 November 1976) is a former English cricketer. Gillespie was a right-handed batsman who bowled right-arm fast-medium. He was born in Shrewsbury, Shropshire.

Gillespie made his debut for Shropshire in the 2002 Minor Counties Championship against Herefordshire. He made a further Minor Counties Championship appearance in 2002, against Oxfordshire. He made his only List A appearance in 2002, against Buckinghamshire in the 2nd of the 2003 Cheltenham & Gloucester Trophy. In this match, he bowled 4 wicket-less overs, while with the bat he ended the Shropshire innings 26 not out. The following season he made his only MCCA Knockout Trophy appearance, against Devon.
