= Ana Boulter =

British television presenter

- Born: 29 April 1976 (age 50); Basildon, Essex, England, UK
- Education: The Minster School, Nottingham; Nottingham Trent University
- Occupation: Presenter
- Years active: 1998–present
- Employer: BBC/Sky News
- Partner: Chris Moyles (1999–2002)

Ana Boulter (born 29 April 1976) is a British television presenter.

== Early life ==
She attended Lowe's Wong Anglican Methodist Junior School in Southwell. In the 1980s, she swam competitively, with her older sister, and her older sister also played hockey competitively. In May 1989 she took part in the National Triathlon Championships for Southwell Swimming Club. In March 1990 both her and her older sister took part in the East Midlands Triathlon in Lincoln.

She later attended The Minster School, Southwell, Nottinghamshire, then Nottingham Trent University, where she studied broadcast journalism, and took part in sport when at university.

Her father (born c.1948) worked for RHP Industrial Bearings, owned by NSK Ltd., in Newark, becoming deputy managing director by 1997.

== Career ==
Boulter was a presenter on CBBC between 1998 and 2001, then on the BBC regional programme Inside Out, and briefly on Sky News in 2005–06. She later worked in Hong Kong.
