= Tina Charles (singer) =

English singer (born 1954)

- Born: Tina Hoskins; 10 March 1954 (age 72); Whitechapel, London, England
- Genres: Pop, disco
- Occupation: Singer
- Instrument: Vocals
- Years active: 1969–present
- Labels: CBS, MAM, PMG Music

Tina Charles (born Tina Hoskins; 10 March 1954) is an English singer who achieved success as a disco artist in the mid to late 1970s. Her most successful single was the UK no. 1 hit "I Love to Love (But My Baby Loves to Dance)" in 1976.

== Early life ==
Charles was born Tina Hoskins in Whitechapel, London, to actor Charles Hoskins and his wife Hilda. She recovered from meningitis as a newborn. She has a brother, Warren, who was her tour manager during the height of her career.

== Career ==
Charles began her career as a backing singer and session musician and recorded her first solo single in 1969 with a then-unknown Elton John playing piano. During the early 1970s, she supplied vocals for the Top of the Pops album series of cover versions of contemporary hits. In 1971, she made appearances in the first series of The Two Ronnies, the BBC1 sketch show starring Ronnie Barker and Ronnie Corbett, performing songs such as "River Deep – Mountain High" and "Ruby Tuesday".

In 1975, Charles and her friend Linda Lewis were backing vocalists on the Steve Harley & Cockney Rebel chart topping song, "Make Me Smile (Come Up and See Me)". Charles provided the lead vocals for 5000 Volts' 1975 disco hit single "I'm on Fire". Although not publicly acknowledged as a group member at the time due to contractual problems, Charles was considered to have a stronger voice than the group's later official lead singers. The song reached number 4 in the UK Singles Chart, and 26 in the Billboard Hot 100.

Charles' big break came soon after in 1975, when Indian-British composer/producer Biddu, who had just enjoyed success with the disco song "Kung Fu Fighting" for Carl Douglas, produced the singles "You Set My Heart on Fire" and "I Love to Love (But My Baby Loves to Dance)" for her. The latter single spent three weeks at number one on the UK chart in March 1976 and was a major hit around the world. It won a Juno Award in 1977.

Biddu's collaboration continued on a future album and another song hit: "Dance Little Lady Dance". In total, Charles spent 42 weeks on the UK Singles Chart in 1976 alone, mainly due to these two records. During this time, her touring band included Trevor Horn (for a while her boyfriend), Geoff Downes and Bruce Woolley.

Further hits, including "Love Me Like a Lover", "Dr Love", "Rendezvous" and "Love Bug", made her a pop star in Europe, Asia, Australia and New Zealand, but she was never able to achieve success in the US. Her only solo recording to chart significantly in the US was "You Set My Heart on Fire", which reached number 3 on Record World magazine's 'Disco File Top 20' chart in the autumn of 1975.

In 1978, Charles was a joint winner at the World Popular Song Festival held in Tokyo, performing the tune "Love Rocks". Charles represented the UK and shared the top prize with Japan's own entry.

By 1980, her career was in decline and disco music generally was losing some of its public appeal. She attempted to change her disco style for her 1980 album Just One Smile for a more hard edge rock electronic style but the album was virtually ignored. Charles married, had a child and devoted herself for some years to her family life, putting her singing career on hold. In the mid-1980s, she had a resurgence with a remix of "I Love to Love" which was produced by longtime friend and associate Sanny X.

Since 2000, Charles has performed throughout Europe, where disco music and her hit singles have been reappraised and she has become a popular live performer. Charles featured in the Top 5 of the US Hot Dance Music/Club Play chart with "Higher" in 2006. The song was produced by Sanny X. She made a guest appearance with The Producers at their 2007 concert, singing "Slave to the Rhythm". In October 2007, Charles recorded "Hide and Seek" with producer Ian Levine for the album Disco 2008. Her latest album, Listen 2 the Music, was released in March 2008.

In 2010, Charles was signed by the British writer and producer Carl M Cox to his PMG Music production and record label. Other notable acts that have been signed by Cox's label are Sinitta and Amanda Lear. Charles' first single with PMG, "Your Love Is My Light", was released physically on 7 November 2011 and digitally on 14 November. Also in 2010, she went on tour with 5000 Volts, the band with which she experienced her first hit record.

== Personal life ==
Charles married Bernard Webb in 1977 and they divorced in 1979. Their son, Max, was born in London in June 1977. She married Tetoo Hassan in 1993. They lived in Caterham, Surrey, England. Hassan died of cancer in 2013. In 2015, she married David Fancourt. In 2016, they lived in Surrey.

== Discography ==
- 1976 : I Love to Love
- 1976 : Dance Little Lady
- 1977 : Tina Sings
- 1977 : Heart 'n' Soul
- 1980 : Just One Smile
- 2002 : I Love to Love - remix album
- 2007 : Listen 2 the Music
- 2008 : Feels Like Sunday
