= List of Pakistani musicians =

This is an alphabetical list of musicians from Pakistan. The list includes musical bands, some groups and solo artists that are or have been active in the industry. The list also includes film singers, folk singers, pop/rock singers, jazz musicians, rap artists, DJs, qawwal and ghazal traditional artists. Pakistani singers and bands became very popular and started to spring up during the early nineties, with pop, rock and Ghazal becoming more fashionable with the younger generations.

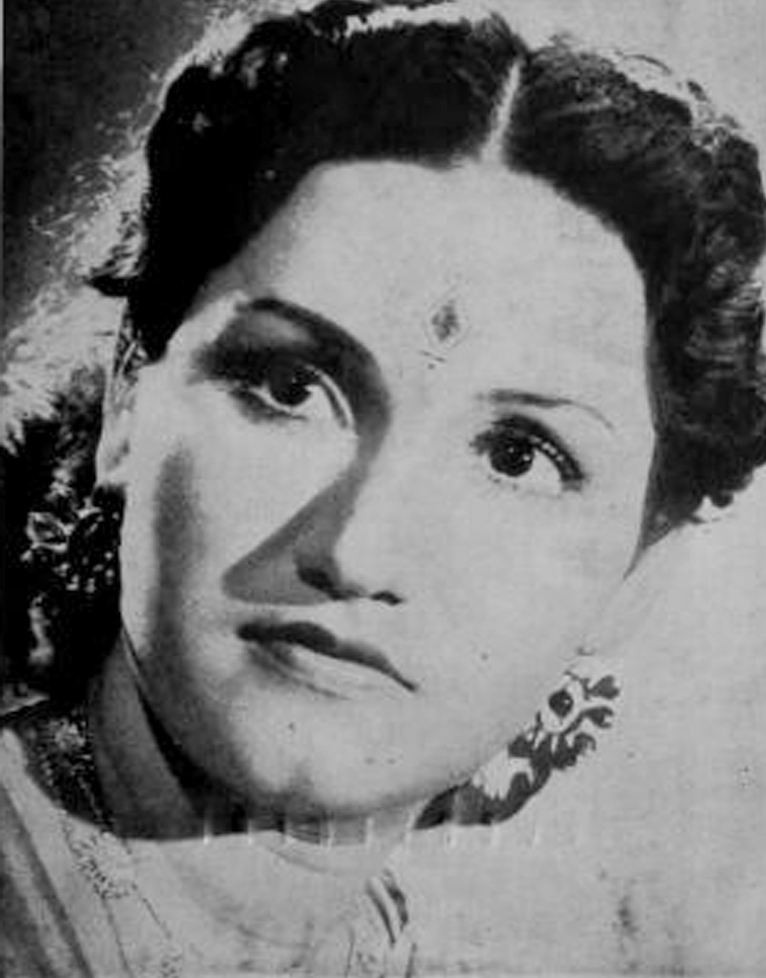
Noor Jehan (Filmi)

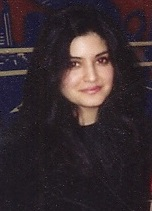
Nazia Hassan (Pop)

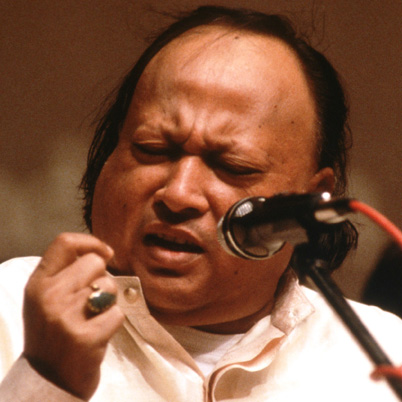
Nusrat Fateh Ali Khan (Qawwali)

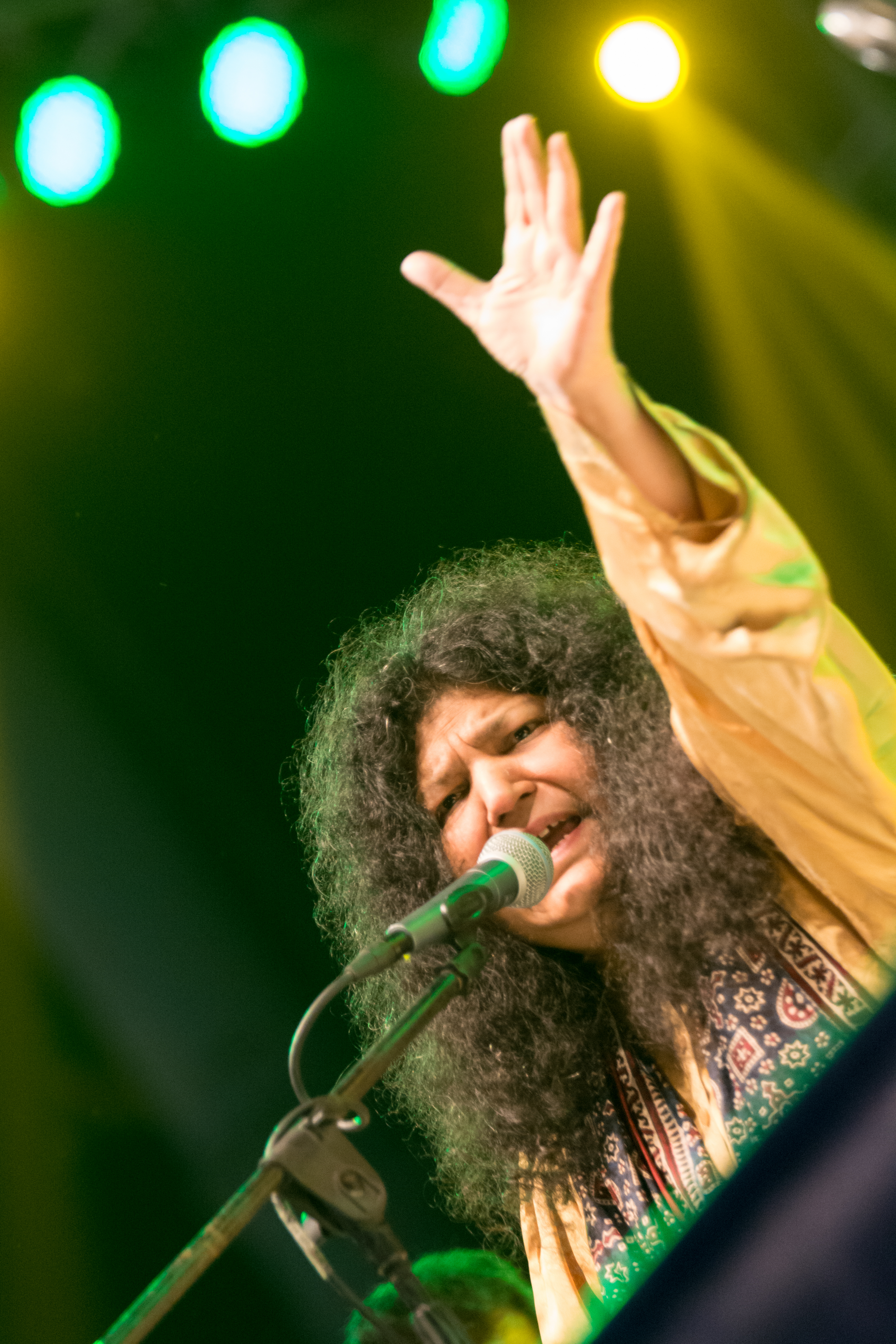
Abida Parveen (Sufi)

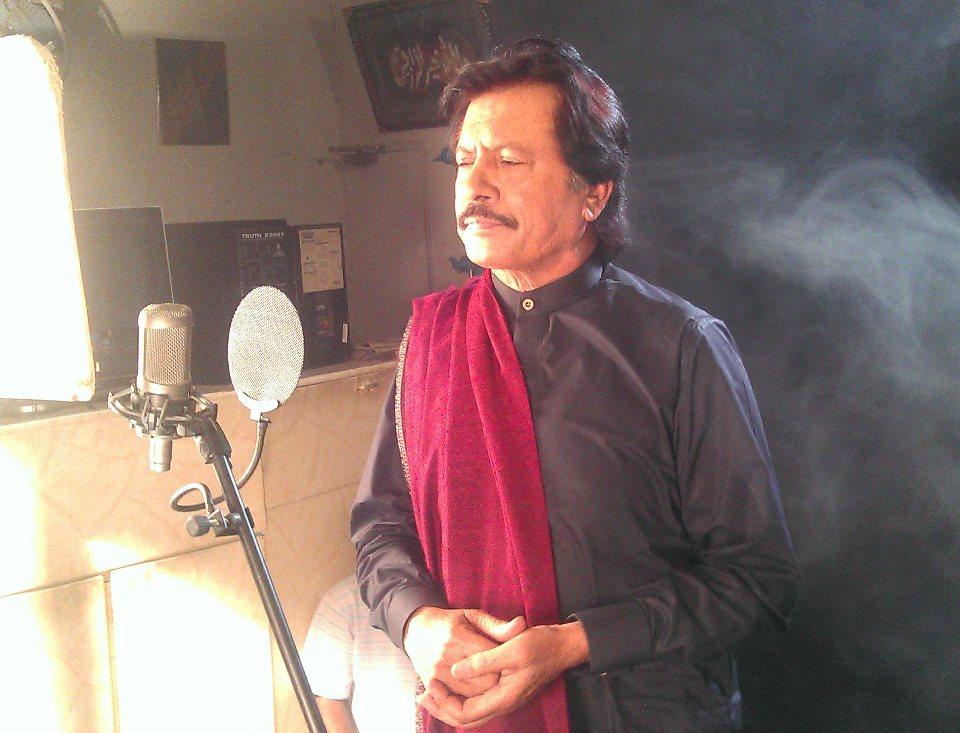
Attaullah Khan Esakhelvi (Folk)

Junoon (Sufi rock)

== A ==
- A. Nayyar
- Ali Zafar
- Aziz Mian
- Aamir Zaki
- Aaroh
- Abdullah Qureshi
- Atish Raj
- Abrar-ul-Haq
- Abida Parveen
- Adil Omar
- Ahmed Ghulam Ali Chagla
- Ahmed Jahanzeb
- Ahmed Rushdi
- Alam Lohar
- Alamgir
- Ali Azmat
- Ali Baba Khan
- Ali Haider
- Ali Sethi
- Allan Fakir
- Atif Aslam
- Alamgir
- Amjad Bobby
- Amjad Farid Sabri
- Annie Khalid
- Arieb Azhar
- Arif Lohar
- Arshad Mehmood
- Asad Amanat Ali Khan
- Asrar
- Asif Sinan, guitarist and composer
- Awaz
- Attaullah Khan Esakhelvi
- Asim Azhar
- Aima Baig
- Ali Gul Pir
- Amanat Ali
- Akhlaq Ahmed

== B ==
- Badnaam (band)
- Bayaan
- Benjamin Sisters
- Bilal Maqsood (Strings)
- Bilal Khan
- Bohemia The Punjabi Rapper
- Brian O'Connell (Junoon)
- Bilal Saeed
- Badar Miandad

== E ==
- Entity Paradigm (Fawad Khan, Ahmed Ali Butt, Zulfiqar Jabbar Khan)

== F ==
- Faisal Kapadia (Strings)
- Farhad Humayun
- Fakhre Alam
- Faakhir Mehmood
- Farhan Saeed
- Farrukh Fateh Ali Khan
- Fariha Pervez
- Farooq Haider

== G ==
- Ghulam Abbas
- Ghulam Farid Sabri (Qawwali Singer)
- Ghazala Javed
- Ghulam Ali
- Ghulam Haider
- Goher Mumtaz
- Gulshan Ara Syed
- Gul Panra

== H ==
- Habib Wali Mohammad
- Hadiqa Kiani
- Haider Rahman (Laal)
- Hamid Ali Khan
- Haroon
- Haroon Shahid
- Hasan Jahangir
- Humera Arshad

== I ==
- Imran Khan
- Inayat Hussain Bhatti
- Irene Perveen
- Irteassh
- Iqbal Bano

== J ==
- Jawad Ahmad
- Jawad Bashir (Dr. aur Billa)
- Jay Dittamo (Junoon)
- Jal
- Jehangir Aziz Hayat
- Junaid Jamshed
- Junaid Khan
- Junoon
- Jupiters
- JoSH
- Jaffer Zaidi

== K ==
- Karavan
- Karan Sharma
- Kami Paul
- Kamal Ahmed
- Komal Rizvi
- Khwaja Khurshid Anwar

== L ==
- Laila Khan (Singer)
- Laal
- Leo Twins

== M ==
- Mala
- Malika Pukhraj
- Maqbool Ahmed Sabri
- Masood Rana
- Master Muhammad Ibrahim
- Mehdi Hassan
- Meesha Shafi
- Mehnaz Begum
- Momina Mustehsan
- Mohammad Aizaz Sohail
- Mumtaz Ahmed
- Mujeeb Alam
- Mustafa Zahid
- Mohammed Ali Shehki
- Munawar Sultana (singer)
- Munni Begum

== N ==
- Nabeel Shaukat Ali
- Nadia Ali
- Naheed Akhtar
- Najam Sheraz
- Naseebo Lal
- Naseem Begum
- Naseer & Shahab
- Naser Mestarihi
- Natasha Baig
- Niaz Ahmed
- Nazia Hassan
- Nazia Iqbal
- Nisar Bazmi
- Noori
- Noor Jehan
- Nusrat Fateh Ali Khan
- Nusrat Hussain
- Nayyara Noor

== O ==
- Overload

== P ==
- Pathanay Khan

== Q ==
- Qurat-ul-Ain Balouch
- Qayaas

== R ==
- Rabi Pirzada
- Rahim Shah
- Rahat Fateh Ali Khan
- Reshma
- Rohail Hyatt
- Roxen
- Rangeela

== S ==
- Sabri Brothers
- Sajjad Ali
- Sajid Ghafoor (Sajid & Zeeshan)
- Salma Agha
- Saleem Raza
- Salman Ahmad
- Sanam Marvi
- Sara Haider
- Sara Raza Khan
- Shae Gill
- Shafqat Amanat Ali
- Shahid Akhtar Qalandar
- Shahram Azhar (Laal)
- Shani Arshad
- Shehzad Roy
- Shallum Asher Xavier (Fuzön (band))
- Sain Zahoor
- Shiraz Uppal
- Salman Ali
- Sahir Ali Bagga
- Shani Arshad
- Shuja Haider
- Shamim Nazli
- Sohail Rana
- Suraiya Multanikar
- Syed Zaheer Rizvi

== T ==
- Tahira Syed
- The Band Call
- Taimur Rahman (Laal)
- Tasawar Khanum

== U ==
- Ustad Amanat Ali Khan
- Ustad Muhammad Juman
- Ustad Muhammad Yousuf
- Ustad Nusrat Fateh Ali Khan
- Umair Jaswal
- Uzair Jaswal

== V ==
- Vital Signs

== W ==
- Wajid Ali Nashad
- Waqar Ali
- Waris Baig

== Y ==
- Yasir Jaswal
- Young Stunners (Talha Anjum, Talha Yunus)

== Z ==
- Zeeshan Parwez (Sajid & Zeeshan)
- Zeek Afridi
- Zoheb Hassan
- Zoe Viccaji
- Zeb & Haniya
- Zulfiqar Jabbar Khan (Xulfi)
- Zayn Javadd Malik
- Zubaida Khanum

== See also ==
- Music of Pakistan
- List of Pakistani ghazal singers
- List of Pakistani qawwali singers
- List of Pakistani pop singers
- List of Pakistani music bands
- List of songs about Pakistan
- List of musicians
- List of Pakistanis
