= Sehba Akhtar =

Pakistani poet and film songwriter (1931–1996)

Sehba Akhtar (pen name)
- Born: Akhtar Ali Rehmat; 30 September 1931; Jammu, British India
- Died: 19 February 1996 (aged 64); Karachi, Pakistan
- Occupations: poet, film songs lyricist
- Awards: Pride of Performance Award by the President of Pakistan (1996)

Sehba Akhtar (30 September 1931 – 19 February 1996) was a poet and a film songwriter in Pakistan.

== Early life and career ==
Akhtar was born Akhtar Ali Rehmat in the household of Rehmat Ali Rehmat, a poet and a contemporary of the renowned playwright Agha Hashar Kashmiri, in Jammu, British India. Sehba originally belonged to Amritsar, Punjab, India. He started writing verses in his school days. He finished his high school from Bareilly and later attended the Aligarh Muslim University. Later, before Pakistan's independence in 1947, he visited Karachi along with Quaid-e-Azam Muhammad Ali Jinnah to attend a public gathering organized by Karachi students. Soon after the independence of Pakistan in 1947, he shifted to Pakistan and also started writing poems and songs for Pakistani movies and the Pakistani public.

== Popular poems ==
Akhtar wrote many famous poems and also became involved in writing songs for some Pakistani films.

- "Mein Bhi Pakistan Hoon Tu Bhi Pakistan Hai", sung by Muhammad Ali Shehki, music by Sohail Rana, a Pakistan Television Corporation production
- "Tanha Thee Aur Hamaishah Say Tanha Hay Zindagi", sung by Mehdi Hassan
- "Chand Ki Seij Pe Taaron Se Saja Ke Sehra", sung by Runa Laila, music by Deebo Bhattacharya for film Jhuk Gaya Aasman (1970)
- "Mujhe Bhulaane Walay Tujhe Bhi Chaen Na Aaey", sung by Habib Wali Mohammed (a non-film ghazal song)
- "Wahain Zindagi Kay Hasee'n Khawb Tootay", sung by Jamal Akbar, Music by Kareem Shahab Uddin.
- "Tera Mera Sathi Hay Lehrata Samandar" (film Samander), sung by Ahmed Rushdi
- "Ae watan maan ki tarah", sung by Mohammad Ifrahim

== Death and legacy ==
In late 1995, he became very ill in London, but insisted on returning to Pakistan to launch his poetry book, Mashal. He later died on 19 February 1996.

In Karachi, 'Sehba Akhtar Road' is named after him and a library in Nazimabad No. 4, Karachi also carries his name.

== Awards ==
Akhtar received the Pride of Performance award from the President of Pakistan in 1996.
