= Aaj Jaane Ki Zid Na Karo =

Pakistani Ghazal song

Single by Habib Wali Mohammad
- Released: 1993
- Genre: Ghazal (Raag Yaman Kalyan)
- Length: 7:11
- Composer: Sohail Rana
- Lyricist: Fayyaz Hashmi

"Aaj Jaane Ki Zid Na Karo" (Urdu: آج جانے کی ضد نہ کرو transl. do not insist upon leaving today) is a geet written by Pakistani poet Fayyaz Hashmi. It was composed by Sohail Rana, an eminent Pakistani composer. It was popularized by noted classical vocalist, Habib Wali Mohammad, who also sang it as a film playback singer for the hit Pakistani film Badal Aur Bijli (1973). The song was also sung by famous ghazal singer Farida Khanum in 1993 for Pakistan Television and repeatedly in her live public concerts. It is sung in Raag Yaman Kalyan.

Later on, because of its melody and profoundly romantic and soul piercing lyrics, the song was re-sung by many artistes. Among them was the famous Indian singer Asha Bhosle (Asha Bhosle: Love Supreme, 2006). The song was used as background music in a scene in Mira Nair's Golden Lion award-winning film, Monsoon Wedding (2001).

Habib Wali Mohammad's original version is still very popular. It was part of The Shruti Box, an online music series by Shankar Tucker, where it was sung by Rohini Ravada. A.R. Rahman performed this number in MTV Unplugged Season 2. The song was used in an episode of Crime Patrol broadcast on 9 February 2016 on Sony TV. Mahesh Bhatt also recreated the song for TV show Naamkarann on tabla with Yash Vyas group, with the song being performed by Arijit Singh, which was telecast on Star Plus channel in August 2016. The song was also recreated by Pritam, and featured in 2016 Indian film Ae Dil Hai Mushkil in the voice of Shilpa Rao. A version of the song was also performed by Indian singer Papon in Season 7 of MTV Unplugged. Neha Kakkar, Bollywood singer and one of the judges of Indian Idol 2018, performed this song during the 36th episode, on request of guest actor Jeetendra.
