= List of Pakistani ghazal singers =

This article contains the list of the past, present and forthcoming Ghazal singers that are based in Pakistan. Following are the most popular Pakistani Ghazal singers of all time.

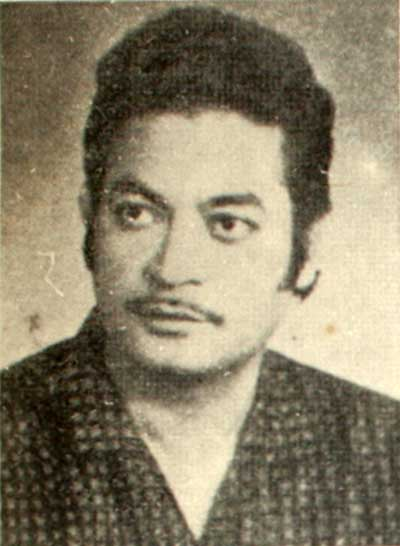
Amanat Ali Khan

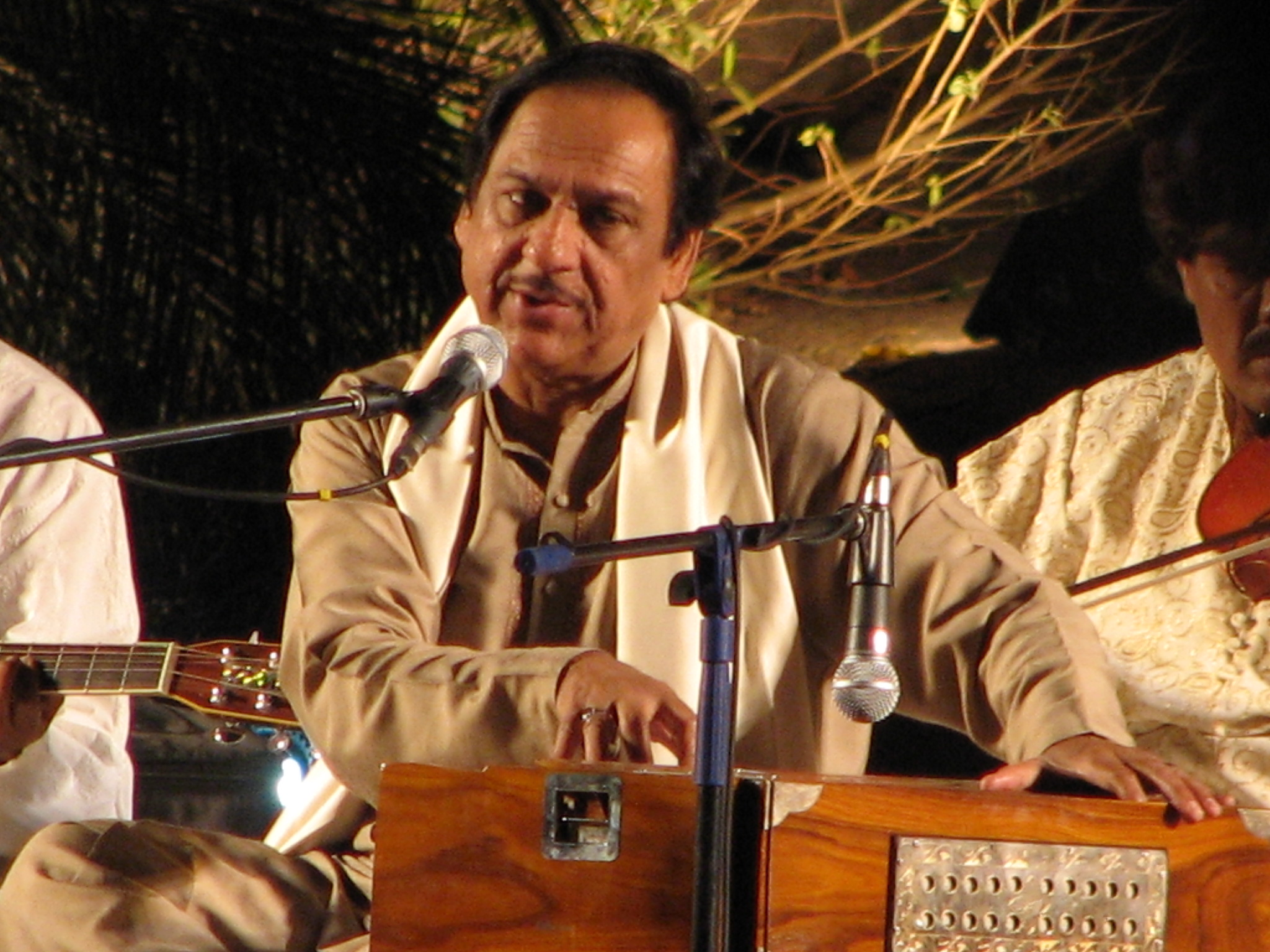
Ghulam Ali

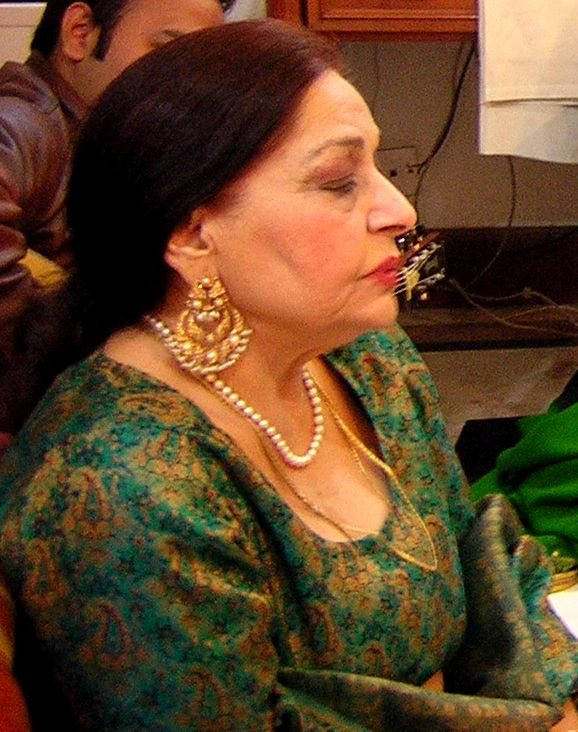
Farida Khanum

For more Ghazal singers by their letter specifications you can find it below.

== A ==
- Ahmed Rushdi
- A Nayyar
- Abida Parveen
- Amanat Ali Khan
- Asad Amanat Ali Khan
- Attaullah Khan Essa Khailwi
- Amjad Parvez

== B ==
- Begum Akhtar
- Bacha Zareen

== F ==
- Farida Khanum

== G ==
- Ghulam Ali
- Ghulam Abbas

== H ==
- Habib Wali Mohammad
- Hamid Ali Khan

== I ==
- Iqbal Bano

== K ==
- Khalil Haider

== M ==
- Malika Pukhraj
- Mehdi Hassan
- Munni Begum

== N ==
- Nayyara Noor
- Nusrat Fateh Ali Khan

== S ==
- Sajjad Ali
- Shafqat Amanat Ali
- Shafqat Ali Khan
- Shoukat Ali Khan

== T ==
- Tahira Syed
- Tina Sani

== See also ==
- Music of South Asia
- Music of Pakistan
- Culture of Pakistan
- List of Pakistani musicians
- List of Pakistanis
