= Niaz Ahmed =

Niaz Ahmed may refer to:

== People ==
- Niaz Ahmed (cricketer) (1945–2000), Pakistani Test cricketer
- Niaz Ahmed (musician) (1946–2019), Pakistani television, radio, and film musician
