= Khalil Haider =

Pakistani ghazal singer

Khalil Haider خلیل حیدر
- Born: 4 May 1965 (age 61); Lakhanwal, Jalalpur Jattan, Punjab, Pakistan
- Genres: Ghazal
- Occupation: Singer
- Years active: 1990 - present

Khalil Haider (Urdu: خلیل حیدر) is a Pakistani ghazal singer.

He became famous after singing famous poet Nasir Kazmi's ghazal Nai kapre badal kar jaoon kahan, in 1990. He has also performed in the UK, Canada and the United States.

Besides Nasir Kazmi's ghazals, he also uses poet Mohsin Naqvi's poems.

== Early life and career ==
Khalil Haider was born on 4 May 1965 in village Lakhanwal, Jalalpur Jattan, Gujrat District, Punjab, Pakistan. He received his primary education there. In 1980, he moved to Lahore with his family. Ustad Sadiq Husain trained him in classical music. He has sung ghazals of several Pakistani poets. He has performed on the Pakistani TV shows, and visited UK, Canada, and the United States for his successful ghazal performances. He has also sung in Pakistani films as a playback singer including the film Anhoni (1993) and Marvi.

=== Performances in live public concerts ===
- In 2012, Khalil Haider performed in a live concert called Ghazal Night at Pakistan National Council of the Arts in Islamabad along with other noted ghazal singers of Pakistan Ghulam Ali, Humaira Channa and Saira Naseem.

== Top Albums & Songs ==
10 Top Albums by Khalil Haider, including the four listed below, are shown on this website:

- Gila - released in 1992 [Oriental Star Agency (OSA) Label]
- Khed Naseeban Dee - released in 1994 (Punjabi language songs by Khalil Haider)
- Tumhara Pyar - released in 2001 [Oriental Star Agency (OSA) Label]
- Preet (Geet & Ghazal)- released in 2010 (Hi-Tech Music Label)
- Suit Boski Da - released in 2018 (Hi-Tech Music Label)
- Mohabbat Ki Haseen Rut Mai - released in 2023 ft Hussain Haider (Khalil Haider Music Label)
- Rab Rab Kar - released in 2023 ft Hussain Haider (Khalil Haider Music Label)

Songs only from above album Preet (Geet & Ghazal) (2010)

- Kya Tujhe Preet Ho Gayi
- Tujhe Udas Bhi Karna Tha
- Gali Gali Meri Yaad
- Jante Boojhte Kanton Se'
- Woh Koi Anhoni Ka
- Teri Aankhon Mein Jo Nami
- Yun Toh Peete Hain Sabhi
- Mekashi Jurm Hai
- Taza Mohabbaton Ka Nasha
- Aa Toh Jaate Hain

== See also ==
- List of Pakistani ghazal singers
