= Mehdi Zaheer =

Pakistani musician, singer, and poet

- مہدی ظہیر
- Born: Syed Iftikhar Mehdi; 1927; Lucknow, Uttar Pradesh, British India
- Died: 5 April 1988 (aged 60–61); Karachi
- Occupations: Musician; singer; poet
- Years active: 1950s – 1988
- Organization: Radio Pakistan
- Television: Pakistan Television (PTV)

Mehdi Zaheer (1927 – 5 April 1988) was a Pakistani musician, singer, poet, and radio producer. He is best known for singing Hum Mustfvi Hein, composing music for Faiz Ahmed Faiz's ghazal Dasht-e-Tanhai (sung by Iqbal Bano), and writing Ahmed Rushdi's song Bandar Road Se Kemari.

== Life and career ==
Zaheer was born as Syed Iftikhar Mehdi in 1927 in Lucknow, Uttar Pradesh, British India. He was fluent in Urdu, Arabic, and Persian languages. He started his radio career at Radio Pakistan, Karachi. In the mid-1950s, he wrote and composed the song Bandar Road Se Kemari Meri Chali Re Ghora Gari, which was sung by Ahmed Rushdi for a children's radio show. The song became popular and later helped Rushdi establish his career as a playback singer.

Another milestone of Zaheer's career was the composition of Faiz Ahmed Faiz's ghazal Dasht-e-Tanhai Mein Ae Jaan-e-Jehan. It was rendered by Iqbal Bano and immediately became famous all across the country. Later, he also vocalized famous poet Nazeer Akbarabadi's Urdu poems Aadmi Nama and Banjara Nama.

In 1974, Zaheer gave voice to the Islamic nationalistic anthem Ham Mustafvi, Mustafvi Hein, which was composed by Sohail Rana for the occasion of the second Islamic Summit Conference held in Lahore. He is also known for rendering the nashid Qaseeda Burda Sharif.

== Death ==
Mehdi Zaheer died on 5 April 1988 in Karachi.

== Compositions and songs ==
Song title	Lyricist	Musician	Singer
Hum Mustafavi Hain	Jamiluddin Aali	Sohail Rana	Mehdi Zaheer
Bandar Road Se Kemari	Mehdi Zaheer	Mehdi Zaheer	Ahmed Rushdi
Aadmi Nama	Nazir Akbarabadi	Mehdi Zaheer	Mehdi Zaheer
Banjara Nama	Nazir Akbarabadi	Mehdi Zaheer	Mehdi Zaheer
Dashte Tanhai Mein	Faiz Ahmed Faiz	Mehdi Zaheer	Iqbal Bano
Har Cheez Hai Mehve Khudnomai	Mohammad Iqbal	Mehdi Zaheer	Mehnaz Begum
