= Yaqoob Atif Bulbula =

Pakistani singer and actor (died 2023)

- Born: Yaqoob Atif; 1947; Lahore, Pakistan
- Died: 13 May 2023 (aged 76); Lahore, Pakistan
- Citizenship: Pakistani
- Occupations: Actor and Singer
- Years active: 1979 - 2021
- Known for: Yaqoob Atif Bulbula (his professional name)

Yaqoob Atif Bulbula (1947 – 13 May 2023) was a Pakistani singer and actor.

Zindagi Paani da bulbula was his most famous song released in October 1979, with music and lyrics by veteran music composer Mian Sheheryar of PTV Lahore. Pop artist Abrar-ul-Haq recreated this song in the 2013 movie Zinda Bhaag.

== Early life and career ==
Yaqoob Atif started showing his singing talent while he was still in high school. The school principal noticed his talent early and asked him to sing Pakistan's national poet Allama Iqbal's highly popular Na'at song and prayer Lab pe aati hai dua ban ke tamanna meri at the school morning assembly. Seeing his popularity at his school, Yaqoob Atif started singing and reciting na'at prayers and songs in other places.

He worked at Radio Pakistan, Pakistani film industry and Pakistani television. He also performed worldwide.

He is often described as the "first Punjabi Rapper."

In 2017, he was experiencing hard times due to lack of work and many illnesses. Due to limited resources, his family was forced to live in a rented home in Mughalpura neighborhood, Lahore District, Pakistan. The Government of Pakistan offered to help him with Rs5,000 each month via a 'Khidmat Card' but he refused it because he considered this small amount 'an insult' considering his reputation and popularity as a singer and an actor.

== TV ==
- Waris, Pakistani television's TV show from 1979
- Andhera Ujala, Pakistani television's TV show from 1984
- Ajj Di Kahani (1998), Punjabi-language TV show

== Films ==
- Pappu Lahoria (2003 film) - A Punjabi-language film

== Death ==
Yaqub Atif had reportedly battled paralysis for the past two years before his death on 13 May 2023.
