= Mian Sheheryar =

Pakistani music composer

- Born: 1927; Lahore, Punjab, British India
- Died: 9 January 2011 (aged 83–84); Lahore, Pakistan
- Occupations: Music composer - TV and film
- Awards: Pride of Performance Award by the President of Pakistan in 1992

Mian Sheheryar (1927 – 9 January 2011) was a Pakistani television and film music composer.

== Early life and career ==
Mian Sheheryar was born in Lahore, Punjab, British India in 1927. After completing his basic education, he obtained a master's degree from the University of the Punjab, Lahore. He started his career with Radio Pakistan, Lahore as a singer in 1948. In 1954, he recorded some of his compositions with the His Master's Voice label. Then he worked with some well-known musicians of the time including Niaz Hussain Shami, Sharif Ghaznavi, Ustad Sardar Khan and Feroz Nizami.

=== His new talent discoveries ===
He joined the Pakistani Television at its Lahore center since its inception in 1964, and worked there for over 40 years until his death in 2011. He is credited with introducing many singers – Naseem Begum (only on PTV - Ghulam Ahmed Chishti had already introduced her in film Guddi Gudda (1956)), classical music and ghazal singer Hamid Ali Khan, Irene Perveen, folk singer Iqbal Bahu, Shabnam Majeed and Hadiqa Kiani. These singers achieved success later in the Pakistani film industry and television.

Some of the Pakistani folk singers he helped develop their career include Suraiya Khanum and Tarannum Naz.

Some of his music assistants that had worked with him at the PTV television center at Lahore, later became accomplished composers themselves - for example, his former harmonium player Rafiq Hussain (d. 2020) later became a music composer himself.

== Popular compositions ==
Song	Singer	Lyricist	Music composer	Notes
Nainon Mein Jal Bhar Aaye, Moorakh Mun Tarpaye, Rooth Gaya Mera Pyar	Naseem Begum	Mushir Kazmi	Mian Sheheryar	Film Begunah (1958)
Aei Watan Kay Sajeelay Jawano, Mere Naghme Tumhare Liye Hein	Noor Jehan	Jamiluddin Aali	Mian Sheheryar	A highly popular song from the Indo-Pakistani War of 1965
Paani Da Bulbula	Yaqoob Atif Bulbula	Mian Sheheryar	Mian Sheheryar	A Pakistan Television Corporation production Composer: Mian Sheheryar
Qaseeda Burda Sharif or Qaṣīda al-Burda (Poem of the Mantle), in praise of prophet Muhammad	Humera Arshad, Fariha Pervez and singer Khurshid Anwar	Imam Sharfuddin Al-Busiri	Mian Sheheryar	A Pakistan Television Corporation production

== Awards and recognition ==
- Pride of Performance Award by the President of Pakistan in 1992.

== Death and legacy ==
Mian Sheheryar died in his hometown Lahore, Pakistan at the Shalamar Hospital on 9 January 2011 at the age of 84. Some of his PTV colleagues including PTV's Lahore general Manager Farrukh Bashir, former PTV producer Mushtaq Sufi and music critic/newspaper columnist Amjad Parvez attended his funeral.

An event was held at the Punjab Institute of Language, Art and Culture (PILAC) in February 2011 to pay tribute to the memory of music composer Mian Sheheryar where the noted playwright and writer Mustansar Hussain Tarar, Amjad Parvez, PILAC Director Sughra Sadaf and Pakistan Television Corporation Deputy Managing Director Shahid Nadeem highlighted his contributions to the music of Pakistan.
