= Amjad Parvez =

Pakistani engineer, writer, and singer (1945–2024)

- امجد پرویز
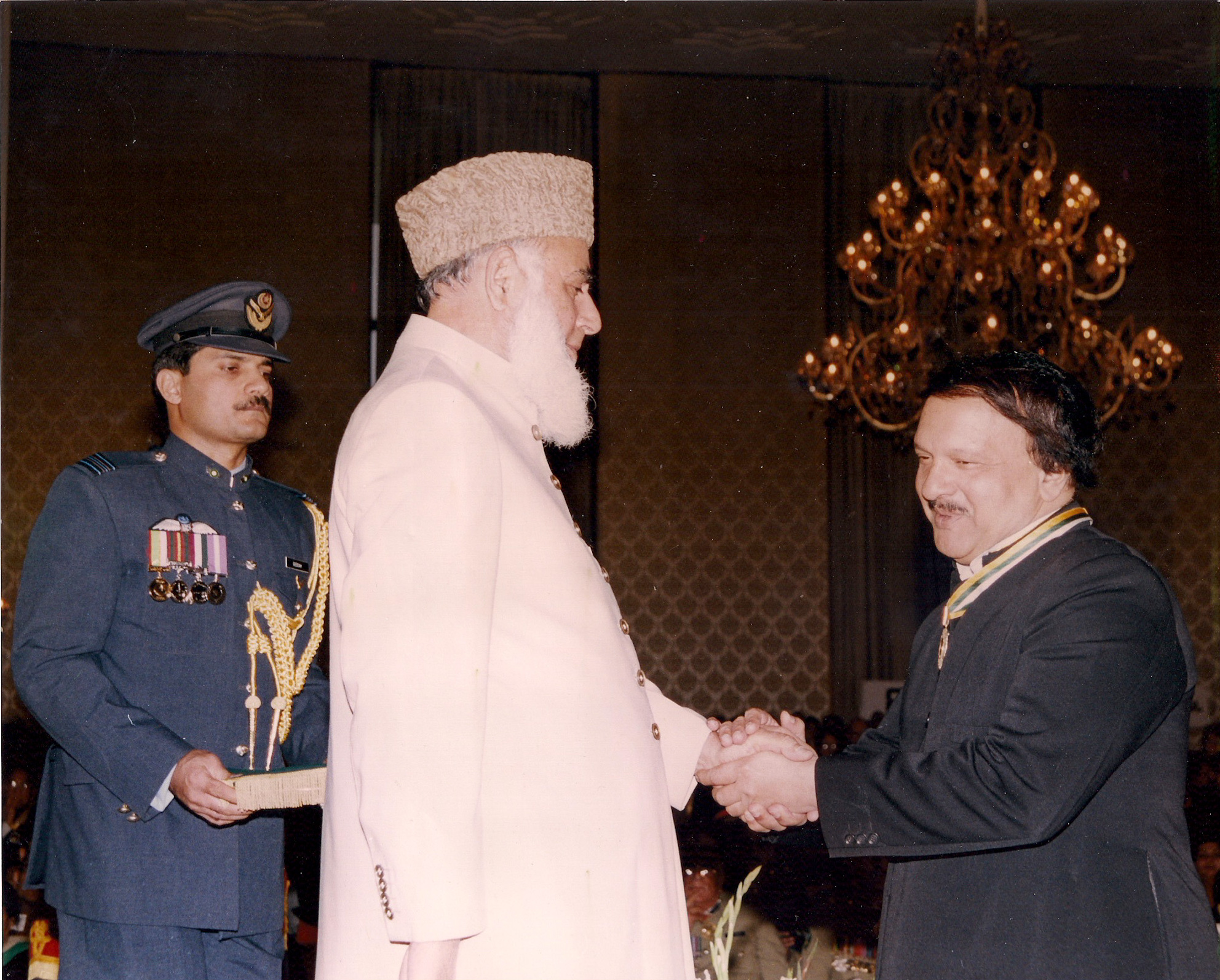
- Pride of Performance Award by President of Pakistan in 2000
- Born: 28 March 1945; Lahore, Punjab Province, British India
- Died: 3 March 2024 (aged 78); Lahore, Punjab, Pakistan
- Occupations: Writer, singer, newspaper columnist
- Known for: Writing many books on musicians and history of music in Pakistan
- Awards: Pride of Performance Award in 2000 by the President of Pakistan

Amjad Parvez (Urdu: امجد پرویز; 28 March 1945 – 3 March 2024) was a Pakistani newspaper columnist, engineer, writer, and singer.

Parvez served as chief engineer, general manager, vice-president and managing director of NESPAK, a Pakistan-based multinational state-owned enterprise, energy contractor, which is a large engineering consultant management company in Africa and Asia.

== Background ==
Amjad Parvez was born in Lahore, British India on 28 March 1945, to Sheikh Abdul Karim who was head of the Chemistry department, Islamia College, Lahore. Parvez's grandfather Khwaja Dil Muhammad was the principal at Islamia College, Lahore. He was also a poet of the Pakistan Movement as his nationalistic poems were read in the annual conventions of Anjuman-e-Himayat-e-Islam mostly presided by Allama Iqbal.

Parvez completed his basic education at Central Model School, Lahore in 1960. He then joined Government College, Lahore (GCU) and University of Engineering and Technology, Lahore (UET) from where he graduated in Mechanical Engineering in 1967. After joining UET in the Faculty of Mechanical Engineering, he proceeded to the University of Birmingham, UK, in 1968, where he qualified for a master's degree in Quality and Reliability Engineering in 1969 and a Doctorate in Engineering Production in 1972.

Parvez died in Lahore, Pakistan on 3 March 2024, at the age of 78. His funeral was held the following day.

== Career ==
Parvez served Nespak (National Engineering Services Pakistan) for nearly 30 years, rose to the positions of general manager and Vice President, and retired as managing director and President in 2005. During his tenure as managing director, he brought in a significant annual amount of business for Nespak.

After retirement from Nespak, Parvez joined as professor at UET responsible for teaching and research at graduate and post-graduate levels in its Industrial & Manufacturing Engineering Department. He also set up a consulting company for UET namely 'Engineering Services UET Pakistan Limited (ESUPAK)'. From 2011 to 2013, he served as the Head of Department for Mechanical Engineering at the University of Lahore. He was a visiting faculty member at Lahore Leads University.

=== Music ===
Parvez had a passion for music since his childhood. He began his career as a child artist in 1954 at Radio Pakistan, Lahore in the children's programme 'Honhaar' before appearing on 'Khatir-e-Ehbaab' program in the sixties. He trained in classical singing from the Ustads of Sham Chaurasia gharana such as Ustad Nazakat Ali Khan-Ustad Salamat Ali Khan duo (became their pupil in 1976), Ustad Ghulam Shabbir Khan-Ustad Ghulam Jaffar Khan duo (1992), and music composers Akhtar Hussain Akhian and veteran TV music composer Mian Sheheryar. He was a practising singer at the Central Production Unit, Radio Pakistan, where he recorded hundreds of ghazals, geets, and other songs since the 1970s in his monthly performances. For two decades, he performed a raag for the programme "Ahang-e-Khusrovi" every month and rendered more than 50 raags in Khayal form. Parvez performed both light, semi-classical music and classical music songs.

Parvez had also been associated with Pakistan Television Corporation (PTV) since its inception in 1964. In his career, he also performed in the US, UK, France, Italy, Norway, Denmark, Egypt, Saudi Arabia, Qatar, UAE, Bahrain, Myanmar and India.

=== Writings ===
- Parvez's writings were widely recognised. He wrote a regular column reviewing books for The Nation (Pakistan), daily newspaper in Lahore, Pakistan for the past three decades of his life.
- His writings were collected in two volumes: ‘Symphony of Reflections’ (2006), and 'Rainbow Of Reflections' (2011). Both books were published by Jahangir Books, Lahore.
- Parvez also spoke and wrote on music. His book titled 'Melody Makers of the subcontinent' covers 47 music composers of India and Pakistan from the 1950s to 1980s. It was published by Sange-Meel Publications, Lahore in 2012.

== Awards and recognition ==
- Pride of Performance Award in 2000 by the President of Pakistan.
- Gold Medal Award by the President of Pakistan for writing the best technical paper for the Institution of Engineers, Pakistan, in 1977.
- Dr. A. Q. Khan Lifetime Achievement Award from the Institution of Engineers, Pakistan in 2009

== Bibliography ==
- Symphony of Reflections 2006. (Jehangir Books, Lahore)
- Rainbow of Reflections, Jahangir Books 2011.
- Melody Makers of the subcontinent, Sange-Meel Publications 2012.
- Melody Singers 1 (English) Sange-Meel Publications 2015
- Melody Singers 1 (Urdu) Sange-Meel Publications 2017
- Melody Singers 2 (English) Sange-Meel Publications 2019
- Rainbow of Reflections (Under Print)

== See also ==
- List of Pakistani writers
- List of Urdu-language writers
- List of Pakistani ghazal singers
- Ghazal
