= Asif Sinan =

Pakistani musician

- Born: Karachi, Pakistan
- Genres: Indian classical music, jazz
- Occupations: Musician, composer, singer
- Instruments: Guitar, bass guitar, folk instruments
- Years active: 2012–present

Asif Sinan (Urdu: آصف سنان) is a Pakistan guitarist and singer. He is known for blending Indian classical music with jazz, and playing guitar in the style of a sitar. Sinan is a graduate of the National Academy of Performing Arts. He has earned international recognition and performed at the Goethe Institute and Deutsches MusikFest in Germany, MOCAFest in London, and toured the US sponsored by its Bureau of Educational and Cultural Affairs.

== Early life and education ==
Born in Karachi, Sinan began playing guitar at age 13, under the tutelage of Aamir Zaki. He later played guitar commercially and in studios. In 2004, he enrolled at the National Academy of Performing Arts and completed a four-year program in music, majoring in guitar. His teachers included Qamar Allahditta and Afaq Adnan.

== Career ==
In August 2013, Sinan released his Eastern classical rendition of Pakistan's National Anthem, drawing media attention for his style of using the guitar like a sitar. Many international artists from Germany, India and the United States have worked with Asif Sinan because of his understanding of both Eastern and Western music. In 2012, he performed at the Goethe Institute, the Institute of Business Administration, Muhammad Ali Jinnah University and the US consulate in Karachi. From February to March 2013, Sinan took part in the US Bureau of Educational and Cultural Affairs' prestigious International Visitor Leadership Program (IVLP), touring the US to perform in New York City, Memphis, Chicago, Milwaukee, Washington DC and Omaha.

In May 2013, Sinan was invited by the German government and the Goethe Institute to represent Pakistan at the 4-day 'Deutsches MusikFest' in Chemnitz, an annual event drawing more than 150,000 people. In October 2013, Sinan was chosen as one of the 10 global artists as a MOCAFellow – an initiative of the World Islamic Economic Forum (WIEF). The Forum's annual conference was held at ExCeL London and was attended by the Prince of Wales Charles (now Charles III) and 16 heads of state. Sinan performed his famous interpretation of Pakistan's National Anthem at the MOCAFest.

Since 2012, Sinan has collaborated with the following artists:

- Ari Roland Jazz Quartet from US
- Stooges Brass Band from New Orleans
- Mike Del Ferro, jazz pianist
- Dr. Peter Weniger, saxophonist from Germany
- Underkarl, a jazz band from Germany
- The Milwaukee Jazz Conservatory from US

== Musical style ==
Asif Sinan is notable for blending Indian classical music with jazz. He plays the guitar with an interesting flourish, making it sound like a sitar in one moment and easily slide into jazz notes while remaining in the same phrasing. Both classical purists and contemporary listeners find his guitar playing unique.

His performances use folk instruments like 'Sindhi banjo', dholak and tabla as well as drums and both electric and acoustic guitars – all of which move fluidly from Indian raga to Western jazz.

I want to create a bridge between jazz and classical. I have played pure classical music on the guitar in many classical baethaks with the taanpura and tabla. However, I also play the same ragas on guitar in a contemporary style for the younger crowd with drums and bass. It shows that if classical music is made contemporary and played well, people will listen.

— Asif Sinan, 2012

== See also ==
- List of Pakistani musicians
- Music of Pakistan
