= Muhammad Ifrahim =

Pakistani singer

- Born: 14 August 1944 (age 81); Delhi, British India
- Occupation: Singer
- Years active: 1966 - present

Muhammad Ifrahim (14 August 1944, Delhi, British India) is a semi-classical, ghazal and playback singer from Pakistan.

== Early life and family ==
Muhammad Ifrahim was born in Delhi, British India in 1944 and migrated to Pakistan in 1965. He lives in Karachi with his wife, three daughters and a son.

== Singing career ==
Ifrahim was inspired by the Indian playback singer Mohammad Rafi and also got some music training from him while still in India. After coming to Pakistan, he sang his first song for the movie, "Jaag Utha Insan"(1966) under the composition of the musician duo Lal Mohammad Iqbal. Then he rendered his voice in a few more films but didn't have any luck as a playback singer. Meanwhile, he started singing semi-classical songs and 'ghazals' for Radio Pakistan and Pakistan Television. Eventually, in 1978, he was offered a national song, "Zameen ki goad rang se umang se bhari rahe" which was composed by the famous musician Sohail Rana. Vocalized by Ifrahim, the song became an all-time popular national melody, earning him countrywide fame. Afterwards, he recorded many patriotic songs for Pakistan Television. He is known as a singer of national songs.

== Popular songs ==
Song title	Lyrics by	Music by
"Gori zara phir se baja payalya peepal ki chhaon main" (along with Naseema Shaheen in movie, "Jaag Utha Insaan")	Dukhi Premnagri	Lal Mohammad Iqbal
"Bichray meet ab aan milay hein" (along with Mehnaz)	Shabi Farooqi	Sohail Rana
"Tum akelay wahan hum akelay yahan"	Shabi Farooqi	Sohail Rana
"Zameen ki goad rang se umang se bhari rahe"	Asad Muhammad Khan	Sohail Rana
"Kal chaudavi ki raat thi shab bhar raha charcha tera"	Ibn-e-Insha	
"Ae watan maan ki tarah"	Sehba Akhtar	Niaz Ahmed
