= Dasht-e-Tanhai =

Single by Iqbal Bano
- Genre: Nazm
- Songwriter(s): Faiz Ahmed Faiz

Dasht-e-Tanhai (Urdu: دشت تنہائی) is a popular Urdu Nazm with the title "Yaad". It was written by Faiz Ahmed Faiz. Originally composed by Mehdi Zaheer for Iqbal Bano, a premier Pakistani ghazal and semi-classical singer, it was later sung by Tina Sani and Meesha Shafi (Coke Studio).

== Lyrics ==
دشت تنہائی میں اے جان جہاں لرزاں ہیں
تیری آواز کے سائے، تیرے ہونٹوں کے سراب
دشت تنہائی میں دوری کے خس و خاک تلے
کھل رہے ہیں تیرے پہلو کے سمن اور گلاب
اٹھ رہی ہے کہیں قربت سے تیری سانس کی آنچ
اپنی خوشبو میں سلگتی ہوئی
مدھم مدھم
دور افق پر چمکتی ہوئی
قطرہ قطرہ
گر رہی رہے تیری دلدار نظر کی شبنم
اس قدر پیار سے اے جان جہاں رکھا ہے
دل کے رخسار پے اس وقت تیری یاد نے ہاتھ
یوں گماں ہوتا ہے گرچہ ہے ابھی صبح فراق
ڈھل گیا ہجر کا دن آ بھی گئی وصل کی رات
دشت تنہائی میں اے جان جہاں لرزاں ہیں
تیری آواز کے سائے، تیرے ہونٹوں کے سراب

== Translation ==
Title: The Desert of my solitude

In the wasteland of my solitude, from beneath the dust and ashes of the gap between us, bloom the jasmines and the roses of your presence.
From somewhere close by rises the warmth of your breath smoldering in its own fragrance – gently, languorously.
Far away, on the horizon, glints drop by drop, the dew of your beguiling glance.
With such tenderness, my love, your longing has placed its hand on the facet of my heart
That although this is the dawn of our farewell, it feels as if the sun has set on our day of parting and the night of our union is already at hand.

== Transliteration ==
Hindi transliteration:

दश्त-ए-तन्हाई मे, ऐ जान-ए-जहां, लरज़ाँ हैं
तेरी आवाज़ के साये,
तेरे होंठों के सराब,

दश्त-ऐ-तन्हाई में,
दूरी के ख़स-ओ-ख़ाक़ तले
खिल रहे हैं तेरे पहलू के समन और गुलाब

उठ रही कहीं हैं क़ुर्बत से
तेरी सांस की आंच
अपनी ख़ुश्बू मे सुलगती हुई
मद्धम मद्धम

दूर उफ़क़ पर चमकती हुई
क़तरा क़तरा
गिर रही है तेरी दिलदार नज़र की शबनम

इस क़दर प्यार से ऐ जान-ए-जहां रक्खा है
दिल के रुख़सार पे
इस वक़्त तेरी याद ने हाथ

यूँ गुमान होता है
गरचे है अभी सुबह-ए-फ़िराक
ढल गया हिज्र का दिन
आ भी गयी वस्ल कि रात

Hunterian transliteration:

Dasht-e-tanhayee mein
Aye jaan-e-jahan larzan hai
Teri awaaz kay saaye
Terey honton kay seraab

Dasht-e-tanhayee mein
Aye jaan-e-jahan larzan hai
Teri awaaz kay saaye
Terey honton kay seraab

Dasht-e-tanhayee mein
Doori ke khas-o-khaak talei
Khil rahee hain tere pehlu kay saman aur gulaab
Dasht-e-tanhayee mein
Aye jaan-e-jahan larzan hai
Dasht-e-tanhayee mein

Uth rahee hai kahin qurbat sey
Teri saans ki aanch
Apni khushboo mein sulaghti huwi
Madham madham...
Door ufaq par chamkati hui
Qatra qatra...
Gir rahee hai teri dildaar nazar ki shabnam
Dasht-e-tanhayee mein
Aye jaan-e-jahan larzan hai
Dasht-e-tanhayee mein

Iss qadar pyar sey
Aye jaan-e-jahaan rakha hai
Dil ke rukhsar pey iss waqt
Teri yaad ney haath
Yunh ghuman hota hai
Garjey hai abhi subh-e-firaaq
Dhal gaya hijr ka din ah bhi gayi wasl-ki-raat
Dasht-e-tanhayee mein
Aye jaan-e-jahan larzan hai
Teri awaaz kay saaye
Terey honton kay seraab

Dasht-e-tanhayee mein
Aye jaan-e-jahan larzan hai
