= Momi Gul Durrani =

Pakistani air hostess (1938–1965)

- مومی گل درانی
- Born: Momina Gul Durrani; 1938; Karachi, British Raj, British India
- Died: 20 May 1965 (aged 26–27); Cairo, Egypt
- Resting place: Cairo
- Other name: Face of PIA
- Citizenship: British Indian (1938-1947); Pakistani (1947-1965)
- Occupations: Air hostess; Model; Flight attendant
- Years active: 1958–1965
- Relatives: Sohail Rana (cousin)

Momi Gul Durrani (1938 – May 20, 1965) was a Pakistani flight attendant and cultural icon who served as the primary face of Pakistan International Airlines (PIA) during its "Golden Age" in the 1950s and 1960s. Known for her poise and beauty, she became an international symbol of Pakistani hospitality and was famously dubbed the "most photographed woman in Pakistan" during her career.

== Early life and family ==
Durrani was born in 1938 into a family of Afghan royal descent. Her ancestors had historically moved from Afghanistan to Saharanpur and Amritsar in British India before the family eventually settled in Pakistan. She was the sister of Qandeel Gul, the wife of the legendary Pakistani music composer Sohail Rana. Rana later described her as a "cheerful, funny, and oriental woman" who commanded respect like a princess in any gathering.

== Career at PIA ==
Durrani joined Pakistan International Airlines at the age of 21. Her career coincided with the leadership of Air Marshal Nur Khan, during which the airline rose to global prominence.

=== The "Face of PIA" ===
Durrani was selected for the airline's marketing campaigns. Her image appeared on global print advertisements, the official PIA calendars and promotion materials for the new Pierre Cardin-designed uniforms introduced in the 1960s. She quickly became an airline's recognizable figure, featuring prominently in print advertisements, calendars, and promotional materials. Her image helped to define the PIA brand.

=== Service to Jacqueline Kennedy ===
The most notable event of her career occurred in March 1962, during U.S. First Lady Jacqueline Kennedy's goodwill tour of Pakistan. Durrani was selected for the elite crew of the Boeing 720B that transported the First Lady. Upon arrival at London Heathrow from Pakistan, Durrani was photographed and filmed presenting a bouquet of flowers to Mrs. Kennedy. The First Lady was so impressed by the service provided by Durrani and her colleagues that she reportedly remarked, "Great people to fly with," a quote that PIA famously turned into its long-standing marketing slogan.

== Personal life ==
She belonged to a Farsi-speaking Durrani family. Her two sisters also joined PIA, one of whom, Qandeel Gul, married the famous music composer Sohail Rana.

== Death ==
Durrani died on May 20, 1965, in the crash of PIA Flight PK705. The flight was an inaugural service from Karachi to London via Cairo.

== Final Flight ==
According to family accounts, Durrani was not originally scheduled to be on the flight. She was called in at the last minute to replace a fellow air hostess who had fallen ill. Reports from survivors, such as Shaukat Miklai, suggest that Durrani appeared unusually somber during the flight, perhaps due to the exhaustion of being reassigned to back-to-back long-haul routes.

== The Crash ==
The aircraft crashed during its night approach to Cairo International Airport, just six miles short of the runway. Durrani was 27 years old. She was buried in a mass grave alongside her colleagues in a cemetery near the Al-Imam al-Shafi'i mosque in Cairo.

== Legacy ==
Durrani's impact on Pakistani pop culture endured long after her death. In the 1970s, a popular doll was manufactured and sold across Pakistan in her likeness, dressed in the signature green PIA uniform. She is often cited as the personification of the high professional standards of PIA's early years. The website Aviation Voice frequently lists her among the top ten most influential or "best" air hostesses in aviation history for her role in branding a national carrier.

== Historical Archive ==
Footage of her serving international dignitaries remains a staple of Pakistani archival documentaries regarding the nation's mid-century modernization.
