= Lakhanwal =

Coordinates: 32°40′08.7″N 74°15′27.8″E

Lakhanwal Khas لکھنوال خاص
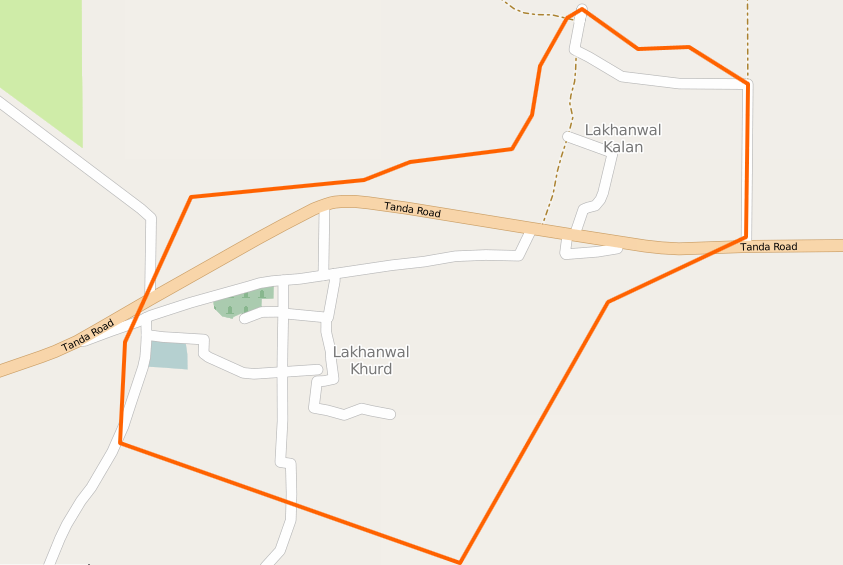
- Lakhanwal Khas outlined in orange
- Country: Pakistan
- Province: Punjab
- District: Gujrat
- Time zone: UTC+5 (PST)
- Calling code: 053

Lakhanwal Khas or simply Lakhanwal (Urdu: لکھنوال خاص) is a village in the Gujrat District, in the Punjab province of Pakistan. Lakhanwal Khas is formed by the merger of two closely related villages Lakhanwal Kalan and Lakhanwal Khurd, the former located in the west, and the latter in the east of the combined settlement. These two villages are separated by Tanda Road and are collectively known as Lakhanwal.
