= Allan Fakir =

Pakistani folk singer

- علڻ فقير Alias ٽونئر فقير
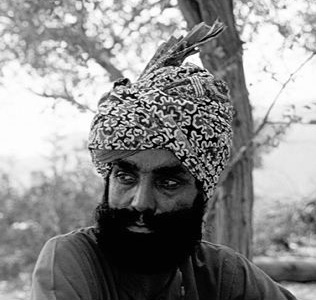
- Born: Ali Bux; 1932; Aamri village, Taluka Manjhand, Jamshoro District, Sind, British India (present-day Sindh, Pakistan)
- Died: 4 July 2000 (aged 67 or 68); Karachi, Pakistan
- Resting place: Buried at Jamshoro Housing Society Graveyard
- Other name: Taunwer Fakir
- Occupation: folk singer
- Known for: Folk music
- Awards: Pride of Performance Award by the President of Pakistan in 1980

Allan Fakir or Allan Faqir (1932 – 4 July 2000) (Sindhi: علڻ فقيرُ) was a Sindhi folk singer from Sindh, Pakistan. He was particularly known for his ecstatic style of performance, marked with devotional rhetoric and Sufi dance-singing.

== Personal life and death ==
=== Birth ===
Allan Fakir was born in 1932 in the Aamari village in Jamshoro District, Sindh in the cottage of Dhamaali Faqeer. He spent his childhood in Manjhand, a town between Sehwan and Hyderabad, Sindh.

=== Community ===
Allan Fakir belonged to the Manganhar community. According to Manganhar traditions, his father used to beat the drum and sing traditional songs at weddings and other festivities. Allan also sang at dargahs.

=== Attachment with mother ===
Allan’s mother left the world soon after his birth, and her untimely demise plunged him into a profound sense of solitude, prompting him to express his melancholy through sombre songs. While searching for motherly love, Allan Fakir departed from his home and arrived at the tomb of the Sufi saint Shah Abdul Latif Bhittai in Bhit Shah. There, he resided for an extended period, immersing himself in the art of devotional singing.

=== Becoming a Fakir ===
Fakir is an Arabic word, and implies a Sufi or a mystic. Thus in the real sense of the word, a 'Fakir' is someone who leads an independent life marked by piety, abstinence from material needs, and contentment with the available resources. Allan himself chose the suffix 'Fakir' for his name.

=== Singing career ===
Under the guidance of his father, Allan Fakir received mentorship. Despite lacking formal schooling, his remarkable memory enabled him to perform Shah Abdul Latif Bhittai's poetry at the shrine every night, adorned with a turban resembling a crown for the next twenty years of his life at the shrine. He sang under the guidance of the famous Sindhi landlord, father of Sindhi culture and flim producer Karim Bux Nizamani. Nizamani was his mentor in singing. Encouraged by Faqir Zawar Qurban Ali Lanjwani and Moolchand Maharaj, Allan continued singing at the shrine, until his meeting with Abdul Karim Baloch who introduced him to Radio Pakistan and Pakistan Television Corporation in Hyderabad, Sindh. Through these mediums, his voice reached almost every single household in Pakistan, which made him a 'performing legend'.

=== Death and burial ===
Allan Faqir died on 4 July 2000, at Liaqat National Hospital, in Karachi, after a paralysis attack. He is buried at the Jamshoro Housing Society in his house which he himself added in his will that he should be buried in his house. He left behind his wife, 3 sons and 2 daughters.

== Super-hit songs ==
- He sang a duet with pop singer Muhammad Ali Shehki, "Allah Allah Kar Bhayya, Humma Humma".
- A patriotic song "Itne bare jeewan saagar mein tu nein Pakistan diya, O' Allah, O' Allah" Sung by Allan Fakir, lyrics by Jamiluddin Aali, music by Niaz Ahmed - A Pakistan Television Corporation, Karachi production (1973)

== Honors and awards ==
Allan Fakir received the following awards:

- President's Pride of Performance award in 1980
- Bukhari Award in 1984
- Shahbaz Award in 1987
- Shah Latif Award in 1992
- Kandhkot Award in 1993

== See also ==
- Shah Abdul Latif Bhittai
- Shaikh Ayaz
