= Moin Ahsan Jazbi =

Indian poet

Dr. Moin Ahsan Jazbi
- معین احسن جذبی
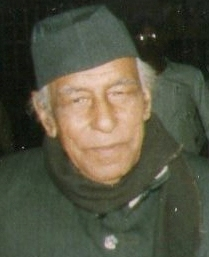
- Born: Moin Ahsan; 21 August 1912; Mubarakpur, Azamgarh
- Died: 13 February 2005 (aged 92); Lucknow, Uttar Pradesh
- Education: Bachelor of Arts (Zakir Husain Delhi College); Master of Arts (Aligarh Muslim University); PhD (Aligarh Muslim University)
- Organization: Progressive Writers Movement
- Notable work: Firozaan, Sukhan-e-Mukhtasar, Gudaaz-e-Shab, Hali Ka Siyasi Shaoor
- Awards: Ghalib Award (1975)

Signature
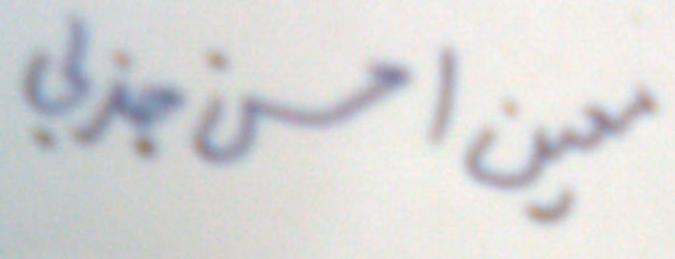

Moin Ahsan Jazbi (21 August 1912 – 13 February 2005) was an Indian poet and writer. He was a member of Progressive Writers Movement. He was a contemporary of Ale Ahmed Suroor, Jan Nisar Akhtar, Abdul Qavi Desnavi, Sahir Ludhianvi, Majrooh Sultanpuri and close friend of Asrarul Haq Majaz. He served as a teacher and reader of Urdu at Aligarh Muslim University.

He started reading poetry of Mirza Ghalib at very young age and started to write at the age of 9. At the age of 19, he wrote a Ghazal which introduced him with other Poets of contemporary time. Some of his known works are Firozaan, Sukhan-e-Mukhtasar, Gudaaz-e-Shab and Hali Ka Siyasi Shaoor. He was awarded with Ghalib Award in 1975 for poetry along with Qazi Abdul Wadood for research and Mohammad Hasan for Drama.

== Early life and education ==
Moin Ahsan Jazbi was born as Moin Ahsan to Ahsanul Ghafoor at Mubarakpur, Azamgarh district. His ancestors originally belonged to Meerut, his great-grandfather Maulvi Hamza Ali was a scholar who shifted to Danapur, Patna during first Indian Independence movement, when Dr. Abdul Ghafoor, grandfather of Jazbi was only 5 years old.

He completed his Bachelor of Arts from Anglo-Arabic College, Delhi (now known as Zakir Husain Delhi College) in 1932 and Master of Arts from Aligarh Muslim University in 1934.

== Career ==
After completion of his education, he started his career as a teacher at Aligarh Muslim University. After serving as a teacher he turned into Journalism and became an editorial staff of Aaj Kal, a monthly magazine published by Publication Division, Delhi. He came back to Aligarh and pursued Doctor of Philosophy from Aligarh Muslim University and got his degree after submitting his thesis with the title Hali Ka Siyasai Shaoor, a research thesis on Political views and works of Khwaja Altaf Hussain Hali.

Later he joined the Department of Urdu of Aligarh Muslim University in 1945 and retired as Reader in Urdu in 1974.

== Scholarly works ==
- Jazbi, Moin Ahsan (1943). Farozan (in Urdu) (1st ed.). Lahore: Maktaba Urdu.
- Jazbi, Moin Ahsan (1959). Hali Ka Siyasi Shuoor (in Urdu) (1st ed.). Lucknow: Sarfaraz Qaumi Press.}
- Jazbi, Moin Ahsan (1960). Sukhan-e-Mukhtasar (in Urdu) (1st ed.). Aligarh: Anjuman Taraqqi Urdu (Hind).}
- Jazbi, Moin Ahsan (1985). Gudaz-e-Shab (in Urdu). New Delhi: Maktaba Jamia Limited.}
- Jazbi, Moin Ahsan (2022). Islam, Zafarul (ed.). Mazameen-e-Jazbi (in Urdu). Delhi: Educational Publishing House.}
