= Shahid Akhtar Qalandar =

"Voice of Hunza" Shahid Akhtar Qalandar شاہد اختر قلندر
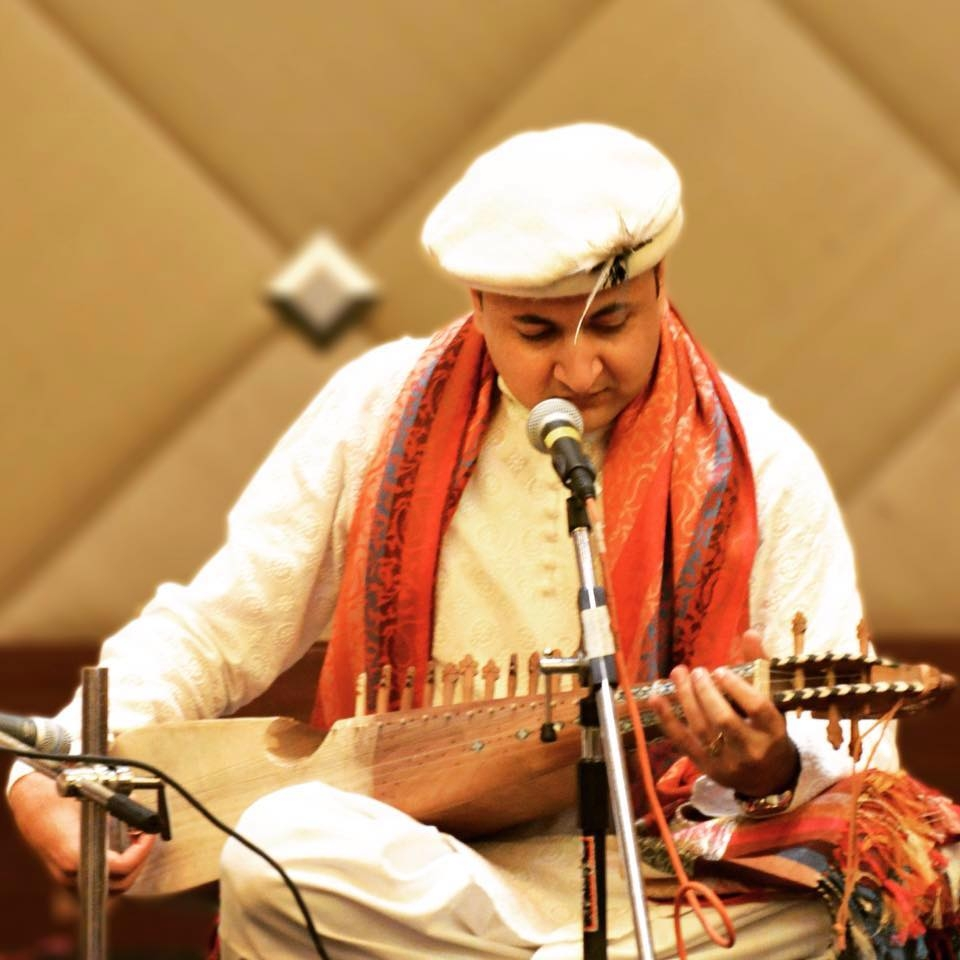
- Shahid A Qalandar during Pakistan day in Kuwait

Background information
- Born: Shahid Akhtar; 1984 (age 41–42); Altit, Hunza, Gilgit-Baltistan
- Occupations: Singer, poet, artist, music composer, interior designer
- Instrument: Rabab
- Years active: Since 2000
- Website: https://www.shahidakhtarqalandar.com/

Shahid Akhtar Qalandar, commonly known by his stage name Qalandari, or Shahid Qalandar, is a Pakistani singer-songwriter born and raised in the Hunza Valley, Gilgit Baltistan, Pakistan.

At the age of 12, he started his musical life as a devotional singer and later explored Hunza Folk music. Since no proper recording was available in the region, he concentrated on compositions and song writing. He is known all over Gilgit-Baltistan for his voice and musical compositions. Over the years, he has composed songs penned by other lyricists, most notably Thala Thala and Mi Khanar Xucha Dayaljaba, written by Muhammad Aslam Khan Sahil. By 2009, he had released six albums: Shama, Qalandari 2002, Thala Thala (the most famous album in the Burushaski language to date), Best of Shahid Akhtar Qalandar, Jajee, and Mehr-e-Minas.

Shahid continues to blend traditional melodies with contemporary sounds and modern videography. In 2024 and 2025, he re-recorded and remastered many of his earlier tracks, growing his YouTube channel to over 41,000 subscribers.

He is a pioneer in using combining traditional and western musical instruments. His song Thala Thala has become an anthem for young people, and its melody has been added to a of traditional folk tunes called Hareep.

In July 2005, he was the first artist from Gilgit Baltistan to perform for President of Pakistan Pervez Musharraf. After the performance, Shahid requested that an auditorium and professional recording studio be built in Gilgit Baltistan where artists from the region could showcase their talent.

Shahid Akhtar Qalandar has recorded six albums and has been part of promoting cultural music of mountains locally and internationally level as a lead singer and rubab player.

Shahid has always encouraged young people, especially girls, from Gilgit-Baltistan to learn music and gain education. In 2007, he introduced the first female singer from the region, breaking the ideology of male dominance in regional music. He believes music and education are the only weapons which can defeat extremism from the region.

In July 2016, Shahid visited Bulbulik the music school in Gojal Hunza and Leif Larsen Music Center at Altit to encourage youth towards music.

In September 2016, he made a video message for youth of Gilgit Baltistan to avoid from drugs and alcohol.

In July 2017, on the occasion of Diamond Jubilee of Prince Karim Aga Khan, the Imam of Shia Ismaili Community, he composed One Jamat Devotional Song in four different languages- Urdu, Persian, Burushaski and Arabic. One Jamat and Ali Guyam Ali Juyam became theme songs for the Ismaili Community in Gilgit Baltistan during the celebrations.

== Award ==
On December 2, 2018, Hunza Arts and Culture Council, Awarded HAAC 2018) Award to Shahid A Qalandar in the recognition of his outstanding services in the field of Hunza Folk Music, Poetry and Singing. As SAQ is currently residing in United States, his Uncle Dr Muhammad Jan received the award on his behalf from Member of GB legislative Assembly Mr.Arman Shah.

== Early life ==
Shahid Akhtar Qalandar was born on February 10, 1984, in small village called Khoshi later named Faizabad at Altit in Hunza Valley locality in Gilgit Baltistan, Pakistan.

Initially, he went Public School and College Jutial in Gilgit Baltistan and then to Indus Valley School of Art & Architecture Karachi to study A Bachelor of Design (B.Des. or B.Design).

== Key Performances ==
=== 2000 ===
- First Silk Route festival in Gilgit Baltistan.
- His first performance at Cultural event in Karachi Ali Bai Auditorium.

=== 2001 ===
- Musical Night in Gilgit and Hunza with Pakistani Singer Humera Channa.

=== 2002 ===
- Radio Pakistan Gilgit Awards ceremony event in Sikardu Baltistan.

=== 2004 ===
- First Hunza Culture Show Event in Islamabad
- Piyaqamar program in Karachi and family musical night at Aga Khan Hospital Auditorium Karachi.

=== 2005 ===
- Performed for President of Pakistan Pervez Musharraf and Ghinani Festival in Hunza Valley.
- Introduced Gilgit Baltistan music at the Pakistan National Council of Arts.

=== 2006 ===
- Gilgit Baltistan Cultural Show at Al Humrah Lahore.

=== 2007 ===
- Shiskat welfare event in Karachi.

=== 2008 ===
- Ginani Festival in Hunza valley

=== 2015 ===
- Pakistan Day Event in Kuwait
- Hunza Cultural Show Islamabad
- Community Event In Kuwait

=== 2016 ===
- Made in Pakistan Festival Kuwait

=== 2017 ===
- First Gilgit Baltistan Cultural Show in Dubai
- Friends of the Aga Khan Museum Event in Dubai

=== 2018 ===
Performed at Central Jubilee Arts Festival in Dallas USA and National Jubilee Arts Festival in Los Angeles, United States
