= Syed Zaheer Rizvi =

Pakistani music director and teacher (born 1973)

Syed Zaheer Rizvi (born 2 April 1973) is a Pakistani music director and teacher. To his credit are not only numerous Pakistani TV drama scores, but he also has the distinct honor of being the only musician in the world to teach music through weekly published newspaper articles during the 1994–1998 era. These articles were published under the title Uncle Mosiqaar in Daily Pakistan. Rizvi has numerous awards in appreciation of his work, some of which include the Asian Academy Award, Multi Media Award, PTV Awards, UNICEF Award and National Award 2012 (given to him by the then prime minister of Pakistan Mr.Raja Parvez Ashraf).

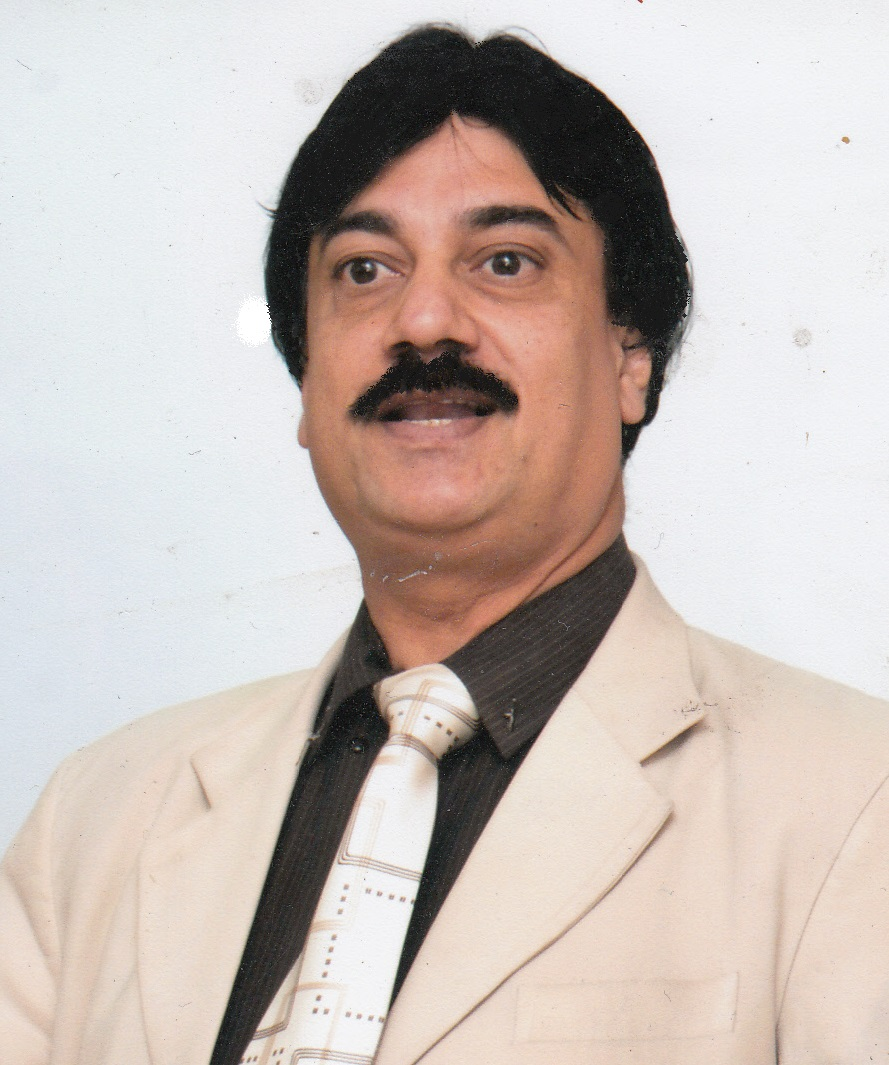
Syed Zaheer Rizvi

== Early life and the journey towards music ==
Rizvi's father Syed Saghir Hassan Rizvi was an accounts officer at WAPDA (Water and Power Development Authority) in Lahore, Pakistan and as a side business was running Union Night College where he would teach English and Math during the evening. His mother Syeda Nafees Fatima was a housewife.

As a child Rizvi was blessed with a beautiful voice and would sing in School Functions at the Govt Islamia High School in Lahore, Pakistan. His teacher Mr. Danish was very impressed with his voice and sought permission from Rizvi's father to take him to a Music Teacher; after much thought and giving way under Rizvi's insistence he allowed him to be taken to the Legendary Ustad Chottay Ghulam Ali Khan in 1983. Ustad Chottay Ghulam Ali Khan was then in his 80s and was very impressed with Rizvi's Singing and immediately took him under his banner.

This would be the beginning of Rizvi's venture into the realm of Classical Music as Ustad Chottay Ghulam Ali Khan taught him the basics of Classical Music and strengthened his voice through extensive voice culturing exercises. In 1986 Chottay Ghulam Ali Khan fell ill and died. He was replaced by Ustad Saleem Iqbal as the principal of Alhamra Arts Council (Lahore, Pakistan). 1986 would also become the year of Rizvi's transcendence from being only a singer to becoming an award-winning Music Director.

== Music direction and teaching ==
Ustad Saleem Iqbal who had replaced the late Ustad Chottay Ghulam Ali Khan (1986) as principal of the Alhamra Arts Council, took interest in Rizvi and appointed him to lead the class on Harmonium as he taught. Ustad Saleem Iqbal was a respected figure in his own right, he had composed more than a 100 super hit Pakistani Film Songs. Some of his super hit songs include "Veer Mera Kori Charyya", "Dil k afsanay Nigahon ki zaban", "Sanu nehar walay pull", the famous Pakistani 1965 war song "Ae Rahay haq k Shaheedo" and "Rang Layega Shaheedon Ka Lahu".

In 1988 Ustad Saleem Iqbal had appointed Rizvi as assistant music director at the Pakistan Broadcasting Corporation (Radio Pakistan) and Pakistan Television (PTV). It is this time when Rizvi learned the Art of Music Direction, Notation and Music Arrangement assisting Ustad Saleem Iqbal. As per Rizvi Ustad Saleem Iqbal was an extraordinarily gifted and dedicated teacher who held nothing back while teaching and took extreme pride in his students. In 1991 as paralysis impaired Ustad Saleem Iqbal he appointed Rizvi officially to teach at the Alhamra Arts Council, thus beginning his career as a Music Teacher. The following year in 1992, Rizvi was also enlisted as a visiting faculty at the Children's Complex (Lahore, Pakistan) where he is teaching to date. Rizvi was also visiting Pakistan Television (PTV) and Pakistan Broadcasting Corporation (Radio Pakistan) independently since Ustad Salim Iqbal was unable due to his ailment; Rizvi was now appointed as the music director on many projects independently. To date Rizvi credits his music direction to the dedicated teaching and training of Late Ustad Salim Iqbal. Following the death of Ustad Salim Iqbal in 1996, Rizvi left Alhamra Arts Council.

Rizvi's Initial work in drama serial "Zara si Chaon" (PTV), in which he not only gave the background score but also composed its title song; was the benchmark of his musical genius which landed him numerous contracts in television, radio and jingles for commercials alike. Although Rizvi is credited with over 150 Drama Serial Scores and over 500 Jingles. Some of his work for the TV includes dramas like "Hasb-e-Arzu na Mila" for ATV (Pakistan), "Don" for PTV, "Zehar Alood" for PTV, "Barsaat Mei Jalta Ghar" for PTV, "Angan Mei Chaand", "Jan-e-Ada", "Mein Wazeer Hun Kissi Aur Ka", "Papa kehtay hain" for Wikkid Channel, "Mama thakur".

During the period 1994–1994 Rizvi became the only person in the world who was teaching music to mass national audience through his weekly published news articles. These articles were published under the title Uncle Mousiqar in Daily Pakistan as weekly additions. In appreciation of this Rizvi received the UNICEF Award. Rizvi's students include more than a 100 professional singers serving Radio, TV and Film. Bindiya (Famous Pakistani Film Star and Singer), Shafaq Ali, Farhat Abbas Shah, Tehmina Raza, Aneeqa Ali, Soofiya Anjum, Nirma (Pakistani Film Actress and Singer), Ghazal, Nida Alvi, Sajna are just a few prominent and famous names to have served Pakistani Film and TV from amongst those taught under Rizvi's banner. Rizvi also regularly writes about music for the general interest of the public: his articles are published in various national newspapers.

== Personal life ==
Rizvi was married on 20 March 1999. He lives in Lahore with his wife, 3 daughters and 1 son and their names are (Fatima, Amna, Hassan and Khadija)

== Lahore School of Arts ==
On 3 May 2014, Rizvi laid the foundation of Lahore School of Arts. The institute already offers a wide variety of courses including Classical Singing, Violin Playing, Guitar Playing, Tabla, Sitaar, Musical keyboard, Photography, Video Editing/Photo Editing, Graphic Designing, Dancing and Acting.LSA's road map includes becoming a degree issuing Institute for the various forms of arts being taught at the institute; and to introduce many more disciplines as the institute matures.
