= Niaz Ahmed (musician) =

Pakistani musician (1946–2019)

- Born: 3 December 1946; Muzaffarnagar district, Uttar Pradesh, British India
- Died: 28 May 2019 (aged 72); Lahore
- Occupation: Music composer
- Years active: 1970 – 2019
- Known for: Classical, semi-classical, pop
- Awards: Pride of Performance Award by the President of Pakistan in 2004; 3 Pakistani television PTV Awards during his career

Niaz Ahmed (3 December 1946 – 28 May 2019) was a Pakistani television, radio, and film musician. He is known for composing classical, semi-classical, and patriotic songs for Radio Pakistan and Pakistan Television.

His popular melodies include Itne Baray Jeevan Saagar Mein Tu Ne Pakistan Dia (singer: Allan Faqir), Dekh Tera Kiya Rang Kar Dia Hai (singer: Alamgir), Mera Inaam Pakistan (singer: Nusrat Fateh Ali Khan), and many others. He has over 2,000 musical compositions to his credit.

== Early life and career ==
Niaz Ahmed was born on 3 December 1946, in Muzaffarnagar district, Uttar Pradesh, British India. His family migrated to Karachi, Pakistan after the Partition of India. Orphaned at an early age, he was raised by his uncle Riaz Ahmed. After completing his secondary school education, Niaz showed his interest in music. His maternal family belonged to the famous classical music school Kirana gharana. Ustad Abdul Karim Khan (1872 - 1932), founder of this gharana, was his maternal grandfather. He got early music lessons from Maulana Abdul Shakoor. Mastering the instruments like harmonium and accordion, he started his music career at Pakistan Television, Karachi. He, for some time, assisted the musicians like Nisar Bazmi, Aashiq Ali Khan, and Deebo Bhattacharya. For five years, he served in Radio Pakistan as an instrumentalist.

Niaz's debut composition as a musician was "Ye Kaisa Bandhan Hai Saajan", vocalized by Mehnaz Begum and aired on Radio Pakistan. Then, he used other voices for his melodies like, Taj Multani, Ishrat Jahan, and Nighat Seema.

The real breakthrough came when Niaz joined Pakistan Television as a music director in the 1970s. At PTV, he created a lots of memorable classical, ghazals, and pop songs, working singers such as Mehdi Hassan, Noor Jehan, Naheed Akhtar, Mehnaz, Nayyara Noor, Abida Parveen, Alamgir, Muhammad Ali Shehki, Allan Faqir, and Nusrat Fateh Ali Khan. Some of his notable melodies for PTV include, "Itne Baray Jeevan Saagar Mein Tu Ne Pakistan Dia" (sung by Allan Faqir), "Hum Mayein Hum Behnein Hum Beetiyan" (sung by Nahid Akhtar), "Har Ghari Tayar Kamran Hein Hum" (sung by Khalid Waheed), "Khusboo Ban Ke Mehak Raha Hai Mera Pakistan" (sung by Lubna Nadeem), "Tum Se Bhichar Ke Zinda Hein" (sung by Muhammad Ali Shehki), "Dekh Tera Kiya Rang Kar dia Hai" (sung by Alamgir), and "Mera Inaam Pakistan" (sung by Nusrat Fateh Ali Khan).

He also gave background music for PTV Khabarnaama, Neelam Ghar, the drama serial Ajab Kahani.

Niaz also composed music for five Urdu, three Punjabi, and three Pashto films. Though, he could not establish himself in cinema's playback music.

Niaz Ahmed was also briefly associated with Pakistan National Council of the Arts (PNCA) and gave some performances there.

== Personal life ==
Niaz Ahmed had Three marriages, four daughters, and four sons. His son Waseem Niaz & Faizan Niaz is also in the music industry.

And His Grandson Maaz Nadeem Is Also Step In Music Industry By Song Hawaa

== Popular compositions ==
=== TV ===
- Itne Baray Jeevan Saagar Mein ... Singer: Allan Faqir, Poet: Jamiluddin Aali
- Hum Mayein Hum Behnein Hum Beetiyan ... Singer: Nahid Akhtar, Poet: Jamiluddin Aali
- Har Ghari Tayar Kamran Hein Hum ... Singer: Khalid Waheed, Poet: Zafar Ullah Poshni
- Khusboo Ban Ke Mehak Raha Hai Mera Pakistan... Singer: Lubna Nadeem, Poet: Ahmed Nadeem Qasmi
- Tum Se Bhichar Ke Zinda Hein ... Singer: Muhammad Ali Shehki, Poet: Iftikhar Arif
- Dekh Tera Kiya Rang Kar dia Hai ... Singer: Alamgir, Poet:
- Ye Shaam Aur Tera Naam ... Singer: Alamgir, Poet: Muhammad Nasir
- Meri Ankhon Se Es Duniya Ko Dekho Singer: Muhammad Ali Shehki, Poet:
- Nainan Tum Chup Rehna ... Singer: Noor Jehan, Poet:
- Nazaray Humein Dekhein Hum Nazaron Ko ... Singer: Muhammad Ali Shehki, Poet: Muhammad Nasir
- Kabhi Tum Idhar Se Guzar Ke To Dekho ... Singer: Alamgir, Poet: Hassan Akbar Kamal
- Mere Pyaar Ke Tu Sung Sung Hai ... Singer: Muhammad Ali Shehki, Poet:
- Babula Way Lay Jaayen Na Log Mujh Ko ... Singer: Afshan Ahmed, Poet:
- Mera Inaam Pakistan ... Singer: Nusrat Fateh Ali Khan, Poet: Jamiluddin Aali

=== Radio ===
- Kajra Ri Akhion Main Nindiya Na Aaye ... Singer: Mehnaz Begum, poet:
- Kya Toota Hai Ander ... Singer: Mehdi Hassan, Poet: Farhat Shehzad

=== Film ===
- Mukh Mor Chala Dil Tor Chala Bedardi Mora Baalma ... Singer: Runa Laila, Film: Shama Parvana (1970), Poet: M. Sultan

== Awards ==
Niaz Ahmed received 27 awards during his career, including:

- Pride of Performance Award by the President of Pakistan in 2004
- 3 PTV Awards (Pakistani television) in the 'Best Musician' category

== Death ==
After a prolonged illness, Niaz Ahmed died on 28 May 2019, at the age of 72, in Lahore, Pakistan. He had been suffering from multiple health issues, including diabetes and cardiac problems.
