= Mohammed Ali Shehki =

Mohammad Ali Sheyhaki
- Born: 9 July 1957 (age 68); Iran
- Genres: Pop, playback singing
- Occupations: Singer, actor, presenter
- Instrument: Vocals
- Years active: 1973–present

Mohammed Ali Shehki (born 9 July 1957) is a Pakistani playback singer. Shehki emerged on the music scene in the 1970s with his originally composed and written songs, with a touch of Persian music. He later earned a name for himself in Pakistani pop music and as a playback singer.

He represented Pakistan at the 1985 ABU Popular Song Contest.

== Early life and education ==
Though Shehki is Persian by origin, he has been living in Pakistan as a Pakistani national for most of his life. His family name 'Shehki' comes from his Iranian father, who used to work at the Iranian Consulate in Karachi. His father married a half-Iranian, half-Pashtun woman living in Karachi at the time.

He studied engineering at the NED University of Engineering and Technology, Karachi, Pakistan, and graduated from there in 1981. Later, he made a career in aviation. Due to his originality, Shehki is the first ever pop singer to receive national awards for consecutive years by Pakistan Television Corporation (PTV), film, and other national and international awards and recognitions.

== Music career ==
Shehki's passion for music took him to the forefront of the Pakistani show business. In 1973, Shehki was among many boys and girls who participated in an audition that Sohail Rana, a well-known Pakistani film and television music composer, conducted for the state-run PTV's Karachi television station. Shehki became Sohail Rana’s first choice after gaining the top position in that audition.

Shehki's debut song was ‘Sambhal, sambhal kar chalna hai.’ The music composer was Sohail Rana, the song was live telecast as an introduction by Karachi television station's program, 'Naghma Zaar'. Then the first full song "Mere pyaar ke tu sung sung میرے پیار کے تو سنگ سنگ" by TV music composer Niaz Ahmed and producer Ghazanfar Ali. Blessed with a good, strong voice and trained in the basics of music by his ustad Habib Ahmed Khan, and then Sohail Rana, Shehki soon gained public recognition. He lent his voice to Sehba Akhtar’s national song (quomi naghma), ‘Mein bhee Pakistan hoon, tu bhee Pakistan hay میں بھی پاکستان ہوں تو بھی پاکستان ہے.’ a big hit of the time, and 'Aye Watan Tere Betay Hain' by music composer Sohail Rana.

After doing a five years stint as a main feature in PTV Program "Jharney", produced by Shoaib Mansoor, he ended up as a highly popular artist, with many hits like "Meri Ankhon se iss dunya ko dekho, phir jo chaho tau chali janaمیری آنکھوں سے اس دنیا کو دیکھو پھر چاہو تو چلی جانا ", "Tumse bicharker", "Nazaray" and several other hit songs. He teamed up with Sultana Siddiqui doing a regular quarterly PTV show Dhanak as a singer and presenter. Then with Sahira Kazimi in PTV show Rang Tarang again for a long span of time. From that show, he piled up his hit songs like "Mere Bachpan Ke Din, Kitnay Achay thay Din" and "Ye Pehli Pehli Barish".

He appeared with famous folk singer Allan Fakir to record this folk song, ‘Teray ishq mein jo doob gaya, Allah, Allah kar bhaiyya". "Ham Raat Bohat Roi" written by the poet Ibn-e-Insha again earned him the national award as the best singer. Due to his origin and fluency in Persian language, he did all Persian poetry programs on PTV of Allama Iqbal with its true essence. His numerous film songs are still remembered fondly, especially songs composed by Indian composer Babul Bose for film "Raaz".

In Pakistani TV film Shorr with actress Babra Sharif, written and directed by Ghazanfar Ali, Shehki, besides playing the lead, also did the music score and film songs.

== Acting career ==
In his film career, he acted in a total of 9 films, his films achieved some success at the box office, but the industry was already on the decline, so he left films. His films are Dekh Tamasha (Piyar do ya maardo), Choron ka Badshah (1988 film) celebrated platinum jubilee, Son of Andata (1987), Zor Awar, Sonia, Guide, Wachan, TV film Shorr.
