= Habib Wali Mohammad =

Pakistani singer (1921 - 2014

- حبیب ولی محمد
- Born: 16 January 1921; Rangoon, Burma, British India (now in Myanmar)
- Died: 3 September 2014 (aged 93); Los Angeles, California
- Occupations: Singer, businessman
- Years active: 1934 – 2014
- Known for: Ghazal singing
- Awards: Special Nigar Award in 1970

Habib Wali Mohammad (Urdu: حبِیب ولی محمد), (16 January 1921 – 3 September 2014) was a Pakistani ghazal and film playback singer.

== Early life ==
Habib Wali Mohammad was born on January 16, 1921, in Rangoon in the Burma province of British India (now in Myanmar) into a conservative Memon family, which later moved to Bombay where he grew up. His family, the Tabanis, has large industrial and business holdings in Pakistan.

During his childhood, Habib Wali Mohammad often listened to Qawwali music. But due to economic and business reasons, he gave priority to academics.

He received his MBA from Syracuse University, New York in 1947, and then lived in Bombay for about 10 years before moving to Pakistan. His brother Ashraf W. Tabani was the governor of the province of Sindh, Pakistan during 1988. He died on 3 September 2014 in Los Angeles, US. The Tabanis belong to the Gujarati-speaking Memon community.

== Career ==
As a youth, Habib Wali received classical music lessons from Ustad Latafat Ali Khan, a nephew of noted musician Ustad Faiyyaz Khan (1880 – 1950). While studying at Ismail Yusuf College, he became active in the musical functions, gaining the nickname 'Taansen'. He completed his bachelor's degree in Bombay.

In 1941, Habib Wali was awarded first prize in a Bombay music competition with 1200 contestants, including the singer Mukesh Chand Mathur. His winning performance was singing the ghazals of the last Mughul Emperor Bahadur Shah Zafar, Lagta Nahin Hai Jee Mera Ujray Diyar Mein, and Yeh Na Thi Hamari Qismat by Mirza Ghalib. He recorded his first LP in the 1950s for Radio Ceylon, now known as Sri Lanka Broadcasting Corporation. Interestingly, the LP record did not have his real name. Instead, he used his stage name of Kamal Roy and the music was composed by Saraswati Devi.

Encouraged by this recognition, at a young age, he took more interest in ghazal singing. During his stay in America, he had been out of touch with music. Hence, he felt lonely and missed his earlier college functions in Bombay. In his own words, "He was not happy in 'Ujray dayar mein', the same ghazal which had won him an award of a lifetime. He put a lot of effort and came out with a gramophone record of ghazals in his voice. On one side of the record, he dubbed Bahadur Shah Zafar's ghazals and on the other side, Ghalib's ghazals. The Indian public was reluctant to buy them at that time.

Listening to these ghazals, actress Meena Kumari became a fan of his, and since she was at the time affiliated with Radio Ceylon, she had his recordings broadcast often. This boosted the sale of Habib Wali's records and contributed to him to becoming a celebrity.

After the independence of Pakistan in 1947, his family migrated to Pakistan and established an industrial group which includes the Shalimar Silk Mills. He gave most of his time to the family business, recording ghazals and geets for films in his spare time, however music was not pursued as a profession.

However, he still sang ghazals for the music companies, including a geet written by the poet Parveen Shakir: 'Gori karath singhar'. In the eighties, he recorded ghazals on audio cassettes which were composed by the noted music director Nisar Bazmi and Pakistan Television, Karachi Center's music director Niaz Ahmed. In addition, he received offers to become a film playback singer for the Pakistani film industry.

Habib Wali Mohammad was from an early group of singers ever to record ghazals. But probably because of his background and as a member of a well-established family, Habib Wali Mohammad had never pursued an aggressive and mainstream career as a singer, though he was still highly regarded among the Pakistani public.

His famous ghazals include Bahadur Shah Zafar's 'Na kisi ki aankh ka noor hoon' and Qamar Jalalvi's 'Kab mera nasheman ahlay chaman'. All of his performances of the ghazals of Bahadur Shah Zafar have been very popular.

His other well-known ghazals, include Aaj Jaane Ki Zid Na Karo. He also sang the famous national song, "Roshan-o-rakhshan, nayyar-o-tabaan, Pakistan rahay".

== Personal life ==
Later in his life, Habib Wali Mohammad lived in Los Angeles, California, United States with his wife, Rehana, and his family, including his sons, Rizwan Wali Mohammad Tabani and Nadeem Wali Mohammad Tabani. Both are ghazal and geet performers in their own right. His son Anwar Wali Muhammad Tabani lives in New Jersey and his daughter Rukhsana lives in Karachi, Pakistan. His brother, Ashraf W. Tabani went on to become the Chairman of Export Promotion Bureau of Pakistan and later served as the Governor of Sindh in the late 1980s.

== Discography ==
Some of the ghazals, recorded in the voice of Habib Wali Mohammad are listed below:

- Lagta Nahin Hai Dil Mera Ujray Diyaar Mein : poet Bahadur Shah Zafar
- Ye na thi hamari Qismath: poet: Mirza Ghalib
- Ja kahio unsay naseem-e-sahar: poet: Bahadur Shah Zafar
- Gajra bana kay lay Aa malaniya: poet: Afshan Rana

== Ghazals for films ==
- 'Aaj janay ki zid na karo': poet: Fayyaz Hashmi, picturised on Nadeem, music of Sohail Rana for film Badal Aur Bijli (1973)
- 'Aashiyan jal gaya' :poet: Raaz Illahabadi, music by Sohail Rana in film 'Baazi (1970)'
- 'Raatain theen chandni', film song lyrics by Waheed Qureshi, music of Sohail Rana in film Baazi (1970)
- 'Marnein Ki Duawain Kyun Maangoon - Jeene Ki Tamanna Kaun Kare', film song lyrics by Moin Ahsan Jazbi, music by Nashad in film Chand Sooraj (1970)

National songs like: Roshan-o- rakhshan, nayyar-o-taban, Aye nigar e watan tu salamat rahay, Sohni dharti Allah rakhe, Lahoo jo sarhad pe beh chuka hay, La fata illah ali la saif-o – illah zulfakar.

== Awards and recognition ==
- Nigar Award - Special Nigar Award in 1970.

== Recent concerts ==
Habib Wali Mohammad had a ghazal concert on 27 February 2010 in Edison, New Jersey, and on 28 February 2010 in West Virginia, performing with his son Nadeem Wali Mohammad, and former singer Bela Modi.

Habib Wali Mohammad recently performed in April 2012 in San Jose, California for the Human Development Foundation in the United States at a fund-raising event.

== Death and legacy ==
Habib Wali Mohammad died in Los Angeles, California after being treated for his illness and health issues due to old age on 4 September 2014 at age 93.
