= Sohail Rana =

Pakistani television and film music composer

- Born: 31 March 1938 (age 88); Agra, British India
- Occupations: Film and television music composer
- Years active: 1962–1989
- Spouse: Qandi Gul Durrani (wife) also known as Afshan Rana
- Children: Adnan Rana (son); Sajeel Rana (sons)
- Relatives: Momi Gul Durrani (sister-in-law)
- Awards: Sitara-i-Imtiaz (Star of Excellence) Award in 2012; Pride of Performance Award in 1981; Lifetime Achievement Award by Pakistan Television Corporation

Sohail Rana (born 31 March 1938) is a Pakistani music composer for films and television. He was introduced by actor Waheed Murad in Pakistan film industry and gained popularity when singer Ahmed Rushdi sang his compositions in such films as Armaan and Doraha. He is now based in Canada.

== Early life and education ==
Sohail Rana was born in Agra, British India, in the home of Urdu poets Mr.& Mrs.Rana Akbarabadi. The family moved to Pakistan soon after the country gained independence in 1947. He earned his Bachelor of Arts degree from the University of Karachi through D.J. Science College initially. Later he received his final B.A. degree from National College, Karachi.

Sohail Rana learned music from various ustads and familiarised himself with the Eastern classical music and the Western music, which added to his experience. Rana was also musically inspired by veteran Indian film music director Naushad Ali. For 25 years, they wrote letters to each other. Naushad Ali also used to advise him on film music in those letters. Pakistani music director Feroz Nizami's film music also inspired him.

== Career ==
=== Films ===
The film Jab Se Dekha Hai Tumhain was Waheed Murad's second film as a producer and the musical debut of Sohail Rana.

Some other popular songs of his are Ko Ko Korina, Bay taab ho udhar tum, Jab pyar mein do dil miltay hain, Oont pay baitha mera munna, which were recorded by Ahmed Rushdi.

Sohail Rana composed the hit songs for the golden jubilee film, Heera Aur Pathar, released on 11 December 1964. The film completed 68 houseful weeks. The film became a musical hit, and Sohail Rana became a well-known name in the Pakistani film industry. The composition of Mujhay tum say mohabbat hai (singers: Ahmed Rushdi and Najma Niazi, and Ja ja ray chanda ja ray (singer: Mala earned him some fame for the above film.

Pakistan's first platinum jubilee film was Armaan (1966). It is an epic tale of broken hearts and broken dreams. The evergreen song Akele na jaana (singer: Mala), with sixty five musicians back then, the biggest orchestra ever gathered until then in Pakistani cinema. Further, Sohail Rana won the prestigious Nigar Award and Graduate awards for the best composer for the film Armaan (1966 film).

By the mid-1960s, Sohail Rana had become a successful film composer. He contributed compositions for the film Ehsaan, released on 30 June 1967. The film attained Silver Jubilee with such favourite songs as Ik naye maur pay, Aye meri zindigi aye meray hum safar, Do akhian, ye do sakhian. The songs of the film Doraha were composed by him, and he was also the producer of the film. The famous tracks are Mujhay tum nazar say gira to rahay ho, Bhooli huwee hoon dastaan, Tumhain kaisay bata doon tum meri manzil ho.

Over the years, he composed for the nazms, Qasm us waqt ki, Jab zindigi karwat badalti hai (Film: Qasam us waqt ki, (singer: Mujeeb Alam) also became a popular film song. Sohail Rana produced lilting music for Nigar Pictures Meray hum safar, released in 1972, three of its popular numbers are Wada karo milo gey (Singer: Ahmed Rushdi, Hai bay qarar tamanna (singer: Mujeeb Alam) and Tujh jaisa dagha baaz (singer: Runa Laila). Similarly, Tujhay apnay dil say mein kaisay bhula doon (singer Ahmed Rushdi) is one of the greatest hits from the film Shehnai.

From 1974 to 1976, Sohail Rana was appointed as the general manager National Orchestra, for Pakistan Television Corporation (PTV), based at Karachi center. His musical masterpieces are Sohni Dharti (singers: Shehnaz Begum, Mehdi Hassan, lyricist: Masroor Anwar) have become part and parcel of Pakistani culture. Likewise, Jeeway Pakistan, Zameen ki goud, and Mein Bhi Pakistan Hoon achieved tremendous success. Furthermore, he composed music for 2 MGD's (Mass gymnastic displays) held in 1975 and 1976 in Islamabad. Also in Islamabad in 1989 he composed music for SAF games (South Asian Federation) games with 100 singers, 150 piece brass band and 35 piece orchestra.

The film Badal Aur Bijli was also a huge success, essentially due to his Bansi bajanay walay (singer: Noor Jehan), Dheeray dheeray zara paoon utha (singers: Masood Rana and Mala), Aaj janay ki zid na karo (singer: Habib Wali Mohammad and little later a private recording by Farida Khanum). The Farida Khanum version has been used in an Indian film Monsoon Wedding (though without Sohail Rana's permission). Besides RPG recording company also released an album (Asha) in which two of his compositions "Aaj jaane ki zid na karo" and "Mujhey tum nazar se gira tau rahe ho" were also released.

Apart from that, Sohail Rana also composed music for the films, Phir chand niklay ga (1970) and Usay deikha Usay chaaha (1974). He also served as Resident composer in PIA Arts Academy sponsored by Pakistan International Airlines from 1972 to 1974, where he conducted Ballet Heer Ranjha, composed and re-arranged music for folk dances and under the directorship of Zia Mohyeddin and with a team of eighty-eight dancers, musicians, singers, he toured the whole world performing in prestigious auditoriums and earned the appreciation of international audience.

Sohail Rana also gave music for the films Saughat, Dil Dekay Dekho, Dil Diwana, Shehnai and Baazi. In total he has composed music for about twenty-four movies. The film Hesaab which was released in 1986 happened to be the last movie for which Sohail Rana composed music. Three of those movies, Guriya, Pagal and Hulchul, could not be released. However, popular numbers from the film Guriya and Hulchul are available on cassettes and vinyl EPs.

=== Television ===
Additionally, he devoted his time to compose over 2000 songs for children. His program for children were telecast from PTV for 19 years from 1968 to 1987, from Kaliyoan Ki Mala, to Sang Sang Chaltay Rehna.

Given below are the names of some of Sohail Rana's well-known students who attained fame for themselves in Pakistani media. Muhammad Ali Shahki, Amjad Hussain, Alamgir, Mona sisters, Benjamin Sisters, Afshan Ahmed, Adnan Sami, Wasim Baig, Nazia Hasan, Zohaib Hassan, Nazneen, Fatima Jaffrey, Anwar Ibrahim and Mehnaz. Sohail Rana released two cassettes of Na'at by Anwar Ibrahim Jaan-e-Madina vol. 1 and 2. Both of these cassettes contained the Naats and Humds by Sohail Rana's poet father Rana Akbarabadi.

Sohail Rana also composed the Summit Anthem Allah-O-Akbar, for Pakistan Television Corporation, in the voice of Mehdi Zaheer and a group of hundred singers, for the first Islamic Summit conference held in Lahore, Pakistan, in 1974.

== Popular patriotic songs ==
National Songs	Singers	Lyrics	Production
Allah tera Shukr	Young ambassadors		
Sohni Dharti Allah Rakhay Qadam Qadam Abaad Tujhe	Shehnaz Begum / Habib Wali Mohammad	Masroor Anwar	A PTV production
Jeevay Jeevay Pakistan	Shehnaz Begum	Jamiluddin Aali	A PTV production
Tera Pakistan hai yeh mera Pakistan Hai	Amjad Hussain		
Mere chand sitaro	Manzoor Niazi and humnawa.		
Ik daali ke phool	Sohail Rana and young ambassadors		
Diyai jalayai rakhain	Mona and young ambassadors		
Jagta rahiyo meray laal	Young ambassadors.		
Tu hai des mera	Mona and young ambassadors		
Aye mere des	Young ambassadors		
Yeh des humara hai	Mona and young ambassadors		
Teri waadi waadi ghumoon	Anwar Ibrahim and young ambassadors		
Main bhi Pakistan hoon, Tu bhi Pakistan hai	Muhammad Ali Shehki / Wasim Baig	Sehba Akhtar	A PTV production
Zameen ki goad	Muhammad Ifrahim		
Iqbal hamara	Young ambassadors		
Mera dil hai Pakistan	Mona and young ambassadors		
Mera des mera mahiya	Anwar Ibrahim and young ambassadors		
Lehraata rahai parcham	Mona / Rakhshanda		
Sooraj karay salaam	Sohail Rana and Mona		
Parcham hai chand tara	Tahira Syed		
Yeh pak sarzameen hai	Mohammad Ifrahim	Jamiluddin Aali	A PTV production
Woh tamaam din	Nayyara Noor		
Aae Nigar-i-Watan tu Salamat rahe	Habib Wali Mohammad	Sehba Akhtar	A PTV production
Unhain kaisay bhool jaoon	Humaira Channa		
Sohna des humara sohna Pakistan	Chorus		
Pak Cheen dosti	Chorus		
Dosti ka haath	Wasim Baig and chorus.		
Jaana likhoon ya jaan likhoon	Akhlaq Ahmed		
Yeh jaan yehi pehchaan	Nayyara Noor		
Meray des rahat rasaan	Sohail Rana and young ambassadors		
Shawa Bhae Shawa	Naveed Ahmed Khan	PTV Program "Rung Barangi Dunya"	
Mera Pakistan Hai	Mona and young ambassadors		

== Life in Canada ==
Sohail moved to Mississauga, Ontario in Canada in the early 1990s where he has opened a school for singers and musicians. In 1997, Punjabi playwright and director Atamjit Singh visited Canada and also directed his play 'Rishtiaan da Kee Rakhiye Naa' that is based upon Saadat Hasan Manto's well-known story Toba Tek Singh. Sohail Rana composed the music of this play that was sung live in Mississauga. The pain of the independence of Pakistan in 1947 was revisited jointly by the artistes and spectators of the two countries. Later Sohail Rana was honoured for his music. As of 2005, he was starting to perform live with interactive multi-media and gave series of concerts in Toronto, Canada involving artists from Pakistan and India.

He made an appearance on Geo TV special in 2009 Aaj Jaane Ki Zid Na Karo (THE TRIBUTE). Sohail Rana was invited to Pakistan by GEO TV, where he, with the stars like Shafqat Amanat Ali Khan, Fariha Pervez, Ahmed Jahanzeb, Ali Haider, Muhammad Ali Shahki, Humaira Channa, Sajjad Ali, along with an orchestra of 37 members presented his popular songs of yester-years.

== Awards and recognition ==
- Pride of Performance in (1981) by the President of Pakistan
- Gold Discs from EMI in (1974) for his vinyl album, Khyber Mail
- Pakistani television (PTV) awarded him with PTV Awards in 1982 and 1989
- Lifetime Achievement Award in 2007 from Pakistan Television Corporation (PTV)
- Sitara-i-Imtiaz (Star of Excellence) Award by the President of Pakistan in 2012
- Nigar Award as Best Music Director for Armaan (1966 film)

He was also given the United Nations Peace Messenger Award, conferred on him, at the United Nations headquarters in New York in 1987.
