= Louisa Jane White =

English singer and composer (born c. 1953)

- Also known as: Lesley Louise Sanderson
- Born: Lesley Whitehouse c. 1953; England
- Genres: Pop, psychedelic pop, rock, r&b
- Instrument: Voice
- Labels: Dansan Records, Decca, MCA, Philips, Pye

Louisa Jane White is an English singer and composer who started performing while still in school during the 1960s. She later had success in the 1970s and competed in overseas music competitions as well as Eurovision selection. She recorded for the Philips, MCA and the President subsidiary Dansan Records Label.

== Background ==
Originally from Tipton, she studied music at school but didn't like the subject. She started singing at the age of six in senior's clubs. Later at the age of thirteen, while still a pupil at Wellington High School for Girls, she got her chance in a weekly 45 minute slot to sing with Terry Heath's resident group, The Van-Dels. Known as then as Lesley Whitehouse, she was among the Van-Dels line up which consisted of Pat Horton on rhythm guitar, Bruce Holcroft on drums, Clive Roberts on bass, and lead guitarist / singer Les Darrell.

During the late 1960s, she was backed by a band called Savage Rose. In the early 70s, one of the songs she covered was Jim Webb's composition, "Jerusalem".

At some stage she was in a girl group with Linda Rothwell and Polly Brown They were managed by Morris King who managed The Walker Brothers. Interestingly, both Brown and White would record Van McCoy songs. Brown recorded "One Girl Too Late" in 1975, and White with "Don't Pity Me" in 1977. Both songs were produced by produced by Gerry Shury and Ron Roker.

As a composer, she had composed songs for Donald Peers, and Patrick Mower and a couple of soundtracks. One of them was for Digby, the Biggest Dog in the World.

== Career ==
=== 1960s ===
In 1968, she had come into contact with pianist, arranger, publisher and producer Tommy Sanderson who signed her up. He didn't get around to recording her until January, 1969. They were looking for the right material. Also, Sanderson and co. wanted Arthur Greenslade to handle the arrangements. Greenslade was in Hollywood working on a movie. He eventually came back on a Monday, took care of the rehearsals on a Wednesday and recorded her with an ensemble of about 21. It was done in two takes. The result was her debut disc of "Caledonia Mission" which was released on Philips.

Also in 1969, Al Grossman was in London, and he heard Louisa Jane White who was 16 at the time. He was impressed with what he heard, so he signed her up. From that, Horace Ott had come over from the United States on May 23, and was set to record her for the American Market. Also that year, a single she recorded, "When the Battle is Over" bw "Blue Ribbons" was released on Philips 1810. It was produced by Des Champ. Peter Jones of Record Mirror gave it a good review, noting the bluesy rhythmic aspect of it and the power of her performance.

=== 1970s ===
In 1970, she released "How Does It Feel" bw "Truth in My Tears" on Philips BF 1834. In February, 1971, her single "Jerusalem" had been released. The gospel leanings and her vocal ability were noted in the good review that Record Mirror gave.

In 1972 she was in Poland, representing the UK at the Sopot Song Festival which ran from August 23 to 26. She was a festival winner, coming second with "That's Beautiful", a Les Reed composition. Also on the second day where the judges were marking the performances instead of the songs, she was in the first three. Later she toured Poland, Germany, and Hungary.

In 1973, her album Louisa Jane White was released on MCA MUPS 483. Also that year in July, she had been part of the Holiday Startime Summer Season show that also included Mike Yarwood, Basil Brush, Johnny Hart, Robert Young and the Jo Cook Dancers. Also that year, the film, Digby, the Biggest Dog in the World was released. It was about a lovable English sheep dog, who as a result of sinister experiments at a NATO facility grows into a giant. He escapes and goes on an interesting and sometimes hair-raising adventure. In addition to composing the film's theme song, White also sang it.

Music trade magazine, Music Week announced in its December 6, 1975, issue that twelve Eurovision selection contestants had made the list to perform 12 songs which would be then judged to see who would then perform in the main event, held in Holland. They included Frank Ifield, Tony Christie, Joey Valentine, Polly Brown, Tammy Jones, Louisa Jane White, and Hazell Dean etc.. On Wednesday 25th February 1976, White competed at the A Song for Europe show which was presented by Michael Aspel and held at the Royal Albert Hall. Her entry was "Take The Money And Run", a Roger Saunders & Scott English composition. With 100 points she came 5th. The winning song was "Save Your Kisses For Me" by Brotherhood of Man. "Take the Money and Run" bw "I'm On Your Side" was issued on PYE Pye 45568 in the UK and in Australia on Astor AP-1894 in 1976. Years later in 2002, it would appear on the Puppets on a String: The Songs of Eurovision compilation.

In 1977, her single, "Don't Stop" by Ron Roker and Gerry Shury was released. It was backed with a Van McCoy composition, Don't Pity Me". Two years later, Faith Hope and Charity would have a hit with their version of "Don't Pity Me".

=== 1980s ===
In 1981, the album, Friends and Neighbours she recorded with Russell Scott and the Brian Dee Quartet was released on Dansan DS 048.

== Personal life ==
Louisa married Phil Sanderson who was the son of her manager Tommy Sanderson.

== Later years ==
"Truth In My Tears" would end up on a mod compilation, Le Beat Bespoke 2 that was released on Circle CPWC107 in 2006.

== Television & film ==
=== Television ===
Television appearances
Show	Episode	Host	Role	Song or interview	Date	Notes
Disc A Dawn		Ayshea Brough	Self		May 24, 1972	
Lift Off with Ayshea	Episode 65	Ayshea Brough	Self		October 25, 1972	
The Good Old Days	"Special 14 Christmas Special 1972"		Self		December 25, 1972 10:00 AM	
Lift Off with Ayshea	Episode 84	Ayshea Brough	Self		June 15, 1973	
Eurovision	A Song for Europe 1976	Michael Aspel	Self	"Take the Money and Run"	February 25, 1976	
Arrows	Episode #1.7		Self		April 27, 1976	Directed by Peter Walker

=== Film ===
Film roles
Film title	Role	Director	Year	Notes
Digby, the Biggest Dog in the World	Singer, title song	Joseph McGrath	1973	

=== Radio ===
Radio appearances
Show	Director / host	Role	Venue	Date	Notes
The Terry Wogan Show	Terry Wogan	Self	BBC Radio 1	Mon 28th Sep 1970, 15:02	
	Jimmy Young	Self	BBC Radio 1	Mon 27th Sep 1971, 10:00	Producer Bryant Marriott
Doddy's Oompah Show	Ken Dodd	Self	BBC Radio 2	Sat 4th Aug 1973, 12:02	Producer Peter Pilbeam

== Discography ==
Singles
Act	Release	Catalogue	Year	Notes
Louisa Jane White	"Caledonia Mission" / "Our Day Will Come"	Philips BF 1766	1969	
Louisa Jane White	" When The Battle Is Over" / "Blue Ribbons"	Philips BF 1810	1969	
Louisa Jane White	"How Does It Feel" / "Truth in My Tears"	Philips BF 1834	1970	
Louisa Jane White	"Jerusalem" / "Little Girl Lost"	MCA MKS 5062	1971	
Louisa Jane White	"Children" / Speak the Truth"	MCA MKS 5070	1971	
Louisa Jane White	"If You Only Need a Friend" / "Take Me Down to The River"	MCA MKS 5086	1972	
Louisa Jane White	"I Thank the Lord for My Friends" / "It's an Ill Wind"	MCA MKS 5100	1972	
Louisa Jane White	"Um Um Um Um Um Um" / "Deep Down In My Heart"	MCA MUS 1204	1973	
Louisa	"What'll I Do" / "Who?"	Decca F 13532	1974	
Louisa Jane White	"Take The Money and Run" / "I'm On Your Side"	Pye 7N 45568	1976	
Louisa Jane White	"Don't Stop" / "Don't Pity Me"	Pye 7N 45661	1977	

Albums
Act	Release	Catalogue	Year	Notes
Louisa Jane White	Louisa Jane White	MCA MCA MUPS 483	1973	
Louisa Jane White, Russell Scott and the Brian Dee Quartet	Friends and Neighbours	Dansan DS 048	1981	

=== Appears on ===
Compilations etc.
Act	Release	Track(s)	Catalogue	Year	Notes
Various artists	Сопот-72	"All My Love" aka Nim zakwitnie tysiąc róż	Мелодия ГД 0003155-6	1972	Louisa Jane White aka Луиза Джен Вайт
Various artists	Puppet on a String	CMRCD498 2002	"Take the Money and Run"	2002	
Various artists	Le Beat Bespoke 2	Circle CPWC107	"Truth In My Tears"	2006	

Publication	Release date	Article title	Page	Link
Record Mirror	Week ending May 3, 1969	The stages of becoming a .. POP SINGER by Peter Jones	9	link
Record Mirror	April 17, 1971	Fancy five minutes with Miss White? by Valerie Mabbs	8	Link
The Stage	Thursday 29 June 1972	Forrester Signs Louisa Jane	6	No direct link
The Stage	Thursday 16 August 1973	LOUISA JANE WHITE currently appearing for the Summer Season in HOLIDAY STARTIME ABC THEATRE. BLACKPOOL Thanks to DAVE FORRESTER ..	16	No direct link
The Stage	Thursday 16 August 1979	SUMMER 79 STAGE: Multi-Talented Miss White	15	No direct link
Shropshire Star	Sept 30, 2019	Singing schoolgirl knocked on door of stardom by Toby Neal	___	Link
Shropshire Star	Jul 21, 2022	Van-Dels who smashed it every Saturday night By Toby Neal	___	Link
