= Leon Pendarvis =

American session musician (born 1945)

Leon Pendarvis, Jr.
- Born: Leroy Leon Pendarvis, Jr. 1945 (age 80–81)
- Occupation: Musician
- Instrument: Keyboards
- Member of: Saturday Night Live Band

Leroy Leon Pendarvis, Jr. (born 1945) is an American session musician and keyboardist best known for his association with the Saturday Night Live Band, where he has served as its pianist, organist, Musical Director and Conductor since 1980. He is also a backing vocalist and an occasional guitarist.

== Early life ==
The son of a second-grade primary school teacher and a school principal, Pendarvis grew up in North Augusta, South Carolina. His father was a deacon at the church and his mother, in addition to teaching, was also pianist at their church. The young Leon graduated from climbing up on the piano bench to hit the keys to being taught by his mother. He also learned to play trumpet and saxophone. He also was a bass player when he came to New York.

== Personal life ==
Pendarvis attended North Carolina Central University where he met and married Emily Norman. They had a daughter, Emile in 1966. After their divorce, he moved to New York and he met and married Janice Gadsden. They married some time after she moved in with her cousin Andrew Gadsden, who was Pendarvis's roommate.

Later, he married former Los Jovenes del Barrio singer Jillian Armsbury, who died in January 2009 from mesothelioma.

He married Josephine Deleon in 2018.

Pendarvis is a board member for the Mesothelioma Applied Research Foundation.

== Career ==
Pendarvis played keyboards and provided the backing vocals for Richard Roundtree's 1972 album, The Man from Shaft. Along with Janice Gadsden, he co-wrote "Sing a Happy Song" for Taj Mahal. He also produced the song which was released in 1978.

He composed, recorded and mixed the original dramatic music for the music video "BAD" by Michael Jackson.

By 2014, Pendarvis has been with the Saturday Night Live Band, playing keyboards for over 40 years and is the longest serving member with the outfit.

Along with guitarist Larry Campbell, and bass virtuoso Pino Palladino, Pendarvis played on the 2018 Bettye LaVette album Things Have Changed, an album of songs by Bob Dylan which was released on Verve Records.

Along with Richard Tee, Pendarvis played keyboards on the Van McCoy & the Soul City Symphony album, Love Is the Answer which was released on Avco Records in 1974. He also played clavinet and piano on their next album Disco Baby, which contained the massive hit in 1975, "The Hustle". He played on McCoy's album The Disco Kid, which was released on Avco Records in 1975.

Artists Pendarvis has worked with over the years include Bonnie Raitt on Streetlights (1974), Van McCoy on Disco Baby (1975), Paul Simon on "Still crazy after all these years" (1975), Barbra Streisand on Songbird (1978), Eric Clapton on August (1986), Don Johnson on Let It Roll (1989), Avril Lavigne on "Keep Holding On" (2006), and many more. He was at one time a member of the group Passion. He is also the musical director and conductor for NBC's Saturday Night Live (SNL) Band, with which he has played since 1980. Since 1986 he has been a member of The Blues Brothers band. He was the husband of singer and chorist Janice Pendarvis (born Janice Gadsden), who sang for Roberta Flack, Sting, Philip Glass, David Bowie, and the Naked Brothers Band.
