= Change (Zulema song) =

Song by Zulema
- A-side: "Change"
- B-side: "Hanging on to a Memory"
- Released: 1978
- Length: 3:25
- Label: LeJoint 5N-34001
- Composer: Z. Cusseaux
- Lyricist: Z-licious
- Producers: Zulema Cusseaux and Van McCoy

Zulema singles chronology
"Hungry For Your Love" (1976)	"Change" (1978)	"I'm Not Dreaming" (1978)

Change was a hit for singer Zulema in 1978. It was her first single for the LeJoint record label.

== Background ==
The track was co-produced by Zulema and Van McCoy. It was distributed by London Records. It appears on her Z-Licious album, released on Le Joint LEJ17000 in 1978.

An advertisement appeared on the front page of the September 23, 1978 issue of Billboard announcing that her debut album for the LeJoint label, Z-Licious was in the process of being made. In the Top Single Picks, it was a recommended disco track in the same issue. In Barry Lederer's Disco Mix section of the September 30 issue, it was stated that the record would be put out on a 12" release for disco play.

The album was reviewed in the October 7 issue of Billboard. It was given a good review which mentioned that McCoy played keyboards on the album. The picks were, "Change," "I'm Not Dreaming," and "Hanging On To A Memory". Barry Lederer of Billboards Disco Mix said that the issuing of the record on a 12" was due to the positive reaction it had been causing at the discos.

The 12" release came out on London 3012. The 12" version was a Richie Rivera mix which boosted the tones and tripled the tambourine. This mix differed from the album version with an addition of Zulema on clavinet and an extended drum part.

== Airplay ==
It was a Hit Bound prediction by Matthew Clenott of WKTU in New York and Freddie James of WLYT in Cleveland. For the week of November 18, Cosmo Wyatt in Boston had it as a "Can't miss".

== Chart ==
It entered the Billboard Hot Soul Singles chart at 89 on the week of October 28. It also entered the Cash Box Top 100 R&B chart on that date at #90. It peaked at no. 53 at week six, spending a total of nine weeks in the Cash Box Top 100 R&B chart. At week seven on December 9, it peaked at no. 46 on the Billboard Hot Soul Singles chart. It spent a total of eight weeks in the chart.

On November 4, the record made its appearance in Billboard's Disco Action Seattle / Washington (previously called Seattle / Portland) chart at no. 5. On December 2, the chart had reverted to Seattle Portland at it was at no. 10. It exited the chart at no. 12 on December 16.

It also spent one week on Billboards National Disco Action Top 40 at no. 37. on January 6, 1979.
