= Polly Brown =

English singer (born 1947)

- Born: Polly Browne; 18 April 1947 (age 79); Birmingham, England
- Genres: Pop music, disco
- Occupation: Singer
- Instrument: Vocals
- Years active: 1969 – present
- Labels: Pye Records, GTO Records

Polly Brown (née Browne; born 18 April 1947) is an English singer from Birmingham. A member of Pickettywitch and Sweet Dreams - and with each group lead singer on a Top Ten hit, respectively "That Same Old Feeling" and "Honey Honey" - Brown had an international solo hit in 1975 with "Up in a Puff of Smoke".

== Background ==
Brown was born in Birmingham, England. She recorded with Pickettywitch from 1969 until 1972, when she cut her first solo album for Pickettywitch's label Pye Records working with producer Tony Eyers. In 1972, DJ Jimmy Savile claimed to be engaged to Brown; she later admitted it was a publicity stunt and said she had no idea that Savile was using her as a cover for his paedophile activities.

At some stage she was in a girl group with Linda Rothwell and Louisa Jane White They were managed by Morris King who managed The Walker Brothers. Interestingly, both Brown and White would record Van McCoy songs. Brown recorded "One Girl Too Late" in 1975, and White with "Don't Pity Me" in 1977. Both songs were produced by produced by Gerry Shury and Ron Roker.

== Career ==
The songwriting/production team of Gerry Shury and Ron Roker had admired Brown's voice from her Pickettywitch recordings. Shury, who had arranged Brown's Pye album release, described her as a cross "between Diana Ross and Dionne Warwick" and in 1974 had her record "Up in a Puff of Smoke" in a session which also produced a cover of the ABBA song "Honey, Honey", on which Roker sang the male vocal.

"Honey Honey" reached the Top Ten in August 1974 assisted by a Top of the Pops appearance by Brown accompanied by Tony Jackson miming Ron Roker's vocal. Jackson would become Brown's regular partner in the Sweet Dreams duo who had five post "Honey Honey" singles, but none of them charted. As a member of Sweet Dreams, Brown was billed as 'Sara Leone'– a pun on the name of African nation of Sierra Leone - and even performed in black face, although after a showdown with producer Robin Nash, she did not do so on Top of the Pops. The performance is available to watch on YouTube, and Brown is wearing a dark wig and light brown make-up.

Concurrent with her Sweet Dreams recordings, Brown's solo career began with the August 1974 release of "Up in a Puff of Smoke" as the inaugural single release on the GTO label. The track fell short of the UK Top 40 with a No. 43 peak However, in the US the song became a Top 20 hit in America breaking in the discos – it reached No. 3 on the U.S. disco chart – to reach No. 16 on the Billboard Hot 100 in March 1975. It also reached No. 29 on the Easy Listening singles chart. "Up in a Puff of Smoke" was also a hit in Canada, reaching even higher in the RPM 100 national chart (No. 11 on 22 March of the same year), as well as in Australia and New Zealand, respectively reaching No. 22 and No. 10 that summer: the track also appeared in the Italian charts with a No. 53 peak. The follow-up single, "You're My Number One", just missed the UK Top 50, peaking at No. 52; in New Zealand the track reached No. 30.

In 1976, Brown took part in A Song for Europe, the national preliminary round to determine the UK entrant for Eurovision 1976. At A Song for Europe 1976, Brown performed two competing numbers: as a soloist she performed "Do You Believe in Love at First Sight?" while Sweet Dreams featuring Brown and Tony Jackson performed "Love, Kiss And Run". These entrants finished at respectively 10th and 4th with Brotherhood of Man's "Save Your Kisses For Me" becoming that year's UK Eurovision entrant and eventual Eurovision winner. Brown remains unique in competing in the same UK pre-selection round for Eurovision as both a soloist and group member.

Brown also recorded the original version of "Dance Little Lady Dance", which became a Top Ten hit for Tina Charles: reportedly the song was passed on to Charles after Brown's label decided against releasing Brown's version. Brown's 1976 single "Love Bug" was eventually recorded by Charles whose version – in medley with "Sweets for My Sweet" – reached No. 26 in 1977.

According to the 5 May 1979 issue of Music Week the group Happy People that Polly Brown was part of were to have their single as the third release on Mike Collier's new Flamingo label which had kicked off with "Get Dancin'" by The Bombers. However, the band that she was in was Sassy with the single, "Lonely Dancer".

=== 1980s ===
In 1980, Brown began recording for her own label Witches Brew, the name a reference to Pickettywitch: her singles included a cover of the Christopher Cross song "Never Be the Same".

== Discography ==
Albums and singles
1973	Polly Brown (Pye NSPL18396) "The Feeling's Right" / "Teardrops Will Fall" / "To Love Somebody" / "The Composer" / "I'm So Glad I Gotcha" / "Wear It on Your Face" / "I'll Cry My Heart Out For You" / "More Than I Can Say" / "Wild Night" / "Crazy Love" / "Bring It On Home To Me" / "Can't Do Without You"
1974	"Up in a Puff of Smoke" GT2 – B-side "Savin' All My Love"
1975	Special Delivery (GTO 2321 003) "Up in a Puff of Smoke" / "Am I Losing My Touch" / "Special Delivery" / "S.O.S." / "One Girl Too Late" / "You're My Number One" / "I'm Saving All My Love" / "Shot Down in Flames" / "Dial L For Love" / "I Need Another Song"
1975	"Dial L For Love" GT14 – B-side "Love, Lovin' You"
1975	"You're My Number One" GT20 – B-side "S.O.S."
1975	"Special Delivery" GT38 - B-side "S.O.S."
1976	"Love Bug" GT61 - B-side "Love Bug Buzzin'"
1977	"Do You Believe in Love at First Sight" GT54 - B-side "Shot Down in Flames"
1977	"Beautiful Things For You" GT88 - B-side "My Heart Keeps Breaking Over You"
1980	"Bewitched" POL1 - B-side "Writing You a Letter"
1981	"I'll Never Be the Same" POL3 - B-side "Stop and Start" (credited to Polly Browne)

== See also ==
- List of disco artists
- List of 1970s one-hit wonders in the United States
- List of performances on Top of the Pops
