= Change with the Times =

"Change with the times"

Song by Van McCoy

from the album The Disco Kid
- A-side: "Change with the Times"
- B-side: "Love Child"
- Released: 1975
- Length: 3:16
- Label: Avco AV-4660
- Composer: Van McCoy
- Producers: Hugo & Luigi

Change with the Times was a disco R&B song by Van McCoy, featuring him on lead vocals, that was a hit on the R&B charts in 1975. It would end up not making much impact in the pop charts.

== Background ==
A high energy dance song, "Change with the Times" was from Van McCoy's album, The Disco Kid that was released in 1975. It has the words, "Change with the times, Keep an open mind, Or you'll wake up and find the world's left you behind".

The rhythm section on Disco Kid album included Gordon Edwards on bass; Richard Tee, Paul Griffin, Leroy Leon Pendarvis, Jr. and McCoy himself on keyboards; Eric Gale, Jerry Friedman, Hugh McCracken on guitars; George Devens, Arthur Jenkins, Jr., David Carey, Ray Armando on percussion; Stephen Gadd, Rick Marrotta on drums; and Ken Bichel on Moog Synthesizer (ARP 2600). Bernie Glow, Paul Faulise, and Arthur Kaplan were among the horn players and Gene Orloff and Emanuel Green were in the strings section. The backing vocals were by Brenda Hilliard, Albert Bailey, and Diane Destry.

"Change with the Times" was one of Cash Box picks of the week for September 27, 1975. The reviewer noted the strong Sly Stone and Earth Wind & Fire influences, calling it a fantastic tune and mentioning the changes the crowd would go through with it.

=== Airplay ===
On the week of October 4, 1975, "Change with the Times" was on the playlist of WABC in New York.

== Chart ==
=== Cash Box Top 100 R&B ===
"Change with the Times" made its debut on the Cash Box Top 100 R&B chart for the week of September 27, 1975. At that time, another McCoy composition, "To Each His Own" by Faith Hope and Charity was at no. 12 in the same chart. It peaked at no. 8 on the Top 100 R&B Singles chart on the week of November 22. It was still in the chart at no. 57 on the week of December 27.

=== Cash Box Top 100 ===
The single debuted on the Cash Box Top 100 Singles chart at no. 89, just behind another debut, "Fly, Robin, Fly" by Silver Convention on the week of October 4. On the week of November 8, the single got to no. 52 on the Cash Box Top 100 chart, and held that position for another week. It was still in the chart at no.58 on November 22.
