= Black Slate =

UK reggae band formed in 1974

- Origin: London, England
- Genre: Reggae
- Years active: 1974—present
- Labels: King George, Sir George, TCD, Ensign, Top Ranking, Sierra, CNR
- Members: Desmond Mahoney; Chris Hanson; Anthony Brightly; Gaven Creary
- Past members: Keith Drummond; Byron Otis; Cledwyn Rogers; Ras Elroy Bailey; Jackie Davies; Chris Charles; Harry T Sarah Tobias; Patrick Matix; Horace Burke; Colin McNeish; Jesse Brade; FJ; Ghetto Priest
- Website: www.blackslatereggae.com

Black Slate are a British reggae band, formed in 1974. They toured around London and backed Jamaican musicians such as Dennis Brown, Delroy Wilson, and Ken Boothe when they played in the UK. They toured the UK in their own right for the first time in 1978, and released four albums between 1979 and 1985.

== History ==
Black Slate was formed in 1974, including musicians from the England, Jamaica, and Anguilla. They backed several Jamaican singers, including Delroy Wilson and Ken Boothe on their UK appearances, and had their first reggae-chart hit themselves in 1976, with the anti-mugging song "Sticks Man", also lined up with Disco Reggae Band under Disco Reggae Band & Black Slate. The record hit the Dutch and Flemish charts as well, after being an underground hit in Antwerp discothèques. They toured the UK for the first time in 1978, and formed their own TCD label, having a minor hit with "Mind Your Motion". They also backed Dennis Brown when he played live in the UK, and in 1980 their Rastafarian rallying call, "Amigo", was picked up by Ensign Records, and broke into the UK Singles Chart, reaching No. 9. A dub album Ogima (Amigo spelled backwards), was released in 1981. The follow-up, "Boom Boom" was also a hit, though less successful. An album, Sirens in the City, followed on Ensign the following year. The band released two further albums in 1982 and 1985.

After a ten-year hiatus they released a new EP, World Citizen, on 15 June 2013, with a UK and European Tour to follow. In November 2014, the band embarked on their first US tour, with dates across California and Texas. The lineup featured original founding members Anthony Brightly, Chris Hanson, Desmond Mahoney and vocalist Jesse Brade. Their 2014 album Now and Then was released on TCD Records and in 2016 they followed up with Peaceful Demonstration, also on TCD.

== Later years ==
Anthony Brightly a.k.a. Anthony "Pure Silk" Brightly got involved in production. In an interview with Reggae Vibes, published on 11 February 2018, he said that he had produced over 500 records in the last 30 years. He also released a single that he produced, "One Girl Too Late", a Van McCoy composition originally recorded by Brenda & the Tabulations in 1973. Released in 1992, this song was credited to Pure Silk feat. Winsome.

== Discography ==
=== Albums ===
- Black Slate (1979, TCD)
- Amigo (1980, Ensign, Wise Owl)
- Sirens in the City (1981, Ensign, Virgin)
- Rasta Festival (1981, Alligator)
- Ogima (1981, Hit and Run) dub album
- Six Plus One (1982, Top Ranking)
- Black Slate (1985, Sierra)
- Get Up and Dance (1995, FairWood Music)
- Now and Then (2014, TCD)
- Peaceful Demonstration (2016, TCD)
- Young Gifted and Black (2020 TCD)

=== Singles ===
Year	Single	Chart Positions					
Year	Single	BE (FLA)	BE (WA)	IRE	NL 100	NZ	UK
1975	"Dread Man Music" (with Honey Boy and Sir Collins)	—	—	—	—	—	—
1975	"Darlin Come Home" (with Honey Boy and Sir Collins)	—	—	—	—	—	—
1976	"Mixed Up Man"	—	—	—	—	—	—
1976	"Lay Your Head on My Shoulders"	—	—	—	—	—	—
1976	"Piano Twist"	—	—	—	—	—	—
1976	"Sticks Man"	14	17	—	— (Note: "Sticks Man" did not chart on the Single Top 100, but did reach #13 on the Single Tip chart)	—	—
1978	"Live Up to Love"	—	—	—	—	—	—
1979	"Mind Your Motion"	—	—	—	—	—	—
1980	"Amigo"	21	—	12	20	9	9
1980	"Boom Boom"	—	—	—	—	11	51
1980	"Reggae Music" (US-only release)	—	—	—	—	—	—
1981	"Live a Life"	—	—	—	—	29	—
1982	"Rasta Reggae"	—	—	—	—	—	—
1982	"Sticks Man" (re-release)	—	—	—	—	—	—
1982	"Look What Love Has Done"	—	—	—	—	—	—
1983	"Tears on My Pillow" (with the Chosen Few)	—	—	—	—	—	—
1984	"Wiser Than Before"	—	—	—	—	—	—
1984	"Seven Hundred Pound Weight" / "Justice and Honour" (featuring Ras Elroy)	—	—	—	—	—	—
1985	"No Justice for the Poor (Tougher Than Tough)"	—	—	—	—	—	—
1993	"Sticksman" (as K.E. Black Slate)	—	—	—	—	—	—
2013	"Romans"	—	—	—	—	—	—
"—" denotes releases that did not chart or were not released in that territory.

== See also ==
- List of reggae musicians
- List of Jamaican backing bands
- List of roots reggae artists
- Fabric Live 31
