= One Girl Too Late =

Song by Brenda & The Tabulations
- Released: February 1973
- Songwriter: Van McCoy
- Producers: Gilda Woods & Van McCoy

Brenda & The Tabulations singles chronology
"Little Bit Of Love" (1972)	"One Girl Too Late" (1973)	"key to My Heart" (1973)

One Girl Too Late is a Van McCoy composition. It was a hit for Brenda & the Tabulations in 1973. It has also been covered by Polly Brown, Gina Foster and Pure Silk featuring Winsome.

== Background ==
Written by Van McCoy and co-produced by McCoy and Guila Woods, the recording was released as a single in February 1973. In the song, the girl tells the story of being in love with a guy who is already taken. A "Soul Pick" in the February 24 issue of Billboard, the reviewer noted Brenda's superb handling of the lead vocal with the smooth flowing of the strings and horns with the male trio singing background.

For the week of March 31, 1973, the Campus News section of Billboard reported play action on Michael Wilde's show at WSUW -FM, U in Minnesota.

== Chart ==
=== Billboard and Cash Box ===
On the week of April 7, 1973, the single entered the Billboard Best Selling Soul Singles chart at no. 49. It peaked at no. 48 the following week. Due to the fact that Billboard at that time were only showing the top 50 bestselling soul singles, there were no more chart entries recorded for the song. And it was at that week (April 14) that it entered the Cash Box R&B Top 65 chart at no. 60. The following week it was at no. 58.

=== Record World ===
It had also seen action in the Record World R&B Singles chart, debuting at no. 55 on March 10. It peaked at no. 44 on March 31 and held that position for another week. It was still in the chart at no. 67 on April 21.

== Other versions ==
Polly Brown recorded her version which was included on her 1975 album, Special Delivery which was produced by Phil Swern and Gerry Shury. Gina Foster who has been with Swing Out Sister and has vocally backed Corinne Drewery has recorded a version of the song. A version was released in 1992 by Pure Silk featuring Winsome. It was produced by Anthony Brightly.
