= Eddy and the Soul Band =

Dutch music ensemble

- Also known as: Eddy & The Soul Band, Eddy and the Soulband, Eddy C. & The Soulband
- Origin: Holland
- Genres: Disco
- Years active: 1980s
- Labels: Philips, Club

Eddy and the Soul Band was a Dutch-based musical ensemble who were active during the 1980s. Led by Eddy Conard they had hits with their versions of Soul Cha Cha", and "Theme from Shaft".

== Background ==
Band leader Eddy Conard is from Gary, Indiana. Growing up he was obsessed with Isaac Hayes' hit song "Theme from Shaft". It was apparently the first record he purchased. Moving to Holland he studied sociology and he became a resident there. A percussionist from the age of twenty he played in bands who supported acts such as The Supremes, The Stylistics, Natalie Cole and Crown Heights Affair. He had a big hit in Holland with his version of Van McCoy's "Soul Cha Cha". Apparently a remark by a Dutch disk jockey gave him the encouragement to record his version of "Theme from Shaft".

In 1982, Conard had some success with the single, "You Are Unique". Credited to Eddy Conard & The American Dance Band, it charted for five weeks in the Netherlands.

== Career ==
=== Soulchacha aka Soul Cha Cha ===
The group covered Van McCoy's song, "Soul Cha Cha", but had the title as "Soulchacha". It was backed with "In the Night". Both sides were produced by Jacques Zwart. It was released in the Netherlands on Philips Philips 818 237–7. The single peaked at no. 24 in the Dutch charts during the first quarter of 1984. It was also a hit in Belgium, spending a total of three weeks in the chart there, peaking at no. 28.

=== Theme from Shaft ===
Eddy and the Soulband recorded their version of the "Theme from Shaft" which was released in the UK in 12" format on Beat Records 308467 (Hot Pursuit Mix), and in 7" format on Club JAB 11.

On the week of January 26, 1985, the 12" Hot Pursuit Mix version which was issued on Break 308467 made its debut in at no. 50 in the Record Mirror Disco chart. On the week of February 23, 1985, the 7" version of the record debuted in the UK singles chart at no. 30. The Hot Pursuit Mix also reached its peak position of no. 3 in the Disco chart that same week. On the week of March 9, 1985, the "Hot Persuit Mix" version of the song had dropped down from no. 4 to no. 5 in the Record Mirror RM Disco chart. At week three, the 7" version of "Shaft" had moved up from 19 to 13. The single 7" version would spend a total of seven weeks in the UK chart, peaking at no. 13. The week of April 6 was also the last week the 12" version was in the Disco chart.

- The single was also in the Record Mirror Night Club chart and was at no. 5 on the week of April 30.
- His version of "Theme from Shaft" came in at no. 61 in the Record Mirror Year End Disco chart for 1985.

=== Further activities ===
The group recorded the single, "The World Turns On (Peace Version)" which was backed with "The World Turns On (Dub Version)". Produced by Jacques Zwart and Albert Boekholt, it was released in the UK on Club JABX 19 in 1985. It was also credited to Eddie C, and the Soulband. In the November 2 issue of Music Week, James Hamilton referred to it as an "oddball Eurodisco instrumental medley of originally Norman Whitfield-produced Temptations/Edwin Starr oldies with unpredictable appeal". It was also in the Airplay Action Bubbling chart that week. It was still in the Bubbling chart on the week of November 9.

== Later years ==
Conard was the featured vocalist on " A Swingin' Safari" by Afringo. It spent four weeks in the Dutch charts, peaking at no. 72 in August, 1992.

== Discography ==
Singles (Netherlands)
Act	Release	Catalogue	Year	Notes
Eddy and the Soulband	"Soulchacha" / In the Night"	Philips 818 237–7	1983	
Eddy and the Soulband	"Theme From Shaft" / "Love-Train"	Philips 880 089–7	1984	
Eddy and the Soulband	Theme From "Shaft" (Special U.K. Mix) / "Vision of Love"	Philips 880 089–7	1985	
Eddie C. And The Soul Band	"The World Turns On (Young & Strong Edit)" / "Boogalized"	Casablanca 884 026–7	1985	
