= Love Is the Answer =

Love Is the Answer may refer to:

- "Love Is the Answer (Stylistics song)", 1975, a song by The Stylistics from The Best of the Stylistics Volume II
- "Love Is the Answer" (Utopia song), 1977, also covered by England Dan & John Ford Coley; also covered by Glen Campbell
- "Love's the Answer", a song by Tanya Tucker
- Love Is the Answer (album), a 2009 album by Barbra Streisand
- Love Is the Answer: 24 Songs of Faith, Hope and Love, a 2004 album by Glen Campbell
- "Love Is the Answer" (Cedric Gervais song), 2011
- "Love Is the Answer", a song by Aloe Blacc from Wake Me Up
- "Love Is the Answer", a song by Funk Fanatics featuring Peyton, remixed by Freemasons
- "Love Is the Answer", a song by Tina Arena from In Deep
- "Love Is the Answer", a song by Weezer from Raditude, also covered by Sugar Ray
- "Love Is the Answer", a song by Cerrone from Supernature (Cerrone III)
