= Van McCoy & the Soul City Symphony =

Musical ensemble led by Van McCoy (1974–1975)

- Origin: United States
- Genres: Disco, soul, R&B
- Years active: 1974–1975
- Labels: Avco, H & L, Philips

Van McCoy & the Soul City Symphony was a musical ensemble led by Van McCoy. The group had several hits during the 1970s. Their biggest hit was "The Hustle".

== Background ==
The ensemble which was led by Van McCoy had three charting hits in the 1970s. They were "Love is the Answer", "Boogie Down", and "The Hustle".

== Career ==
=== Love is the Answer (album) ===
The Love is the Answer album was reviewed in the 26 August 1974 issue of Billboard. The review was positive with the reviewer saying that the soul hits from a number of sources, either funky tunes or soft ballads worked when arranged with a symphony orchestra. The reviewer said that the vocals on some of the tracks worked. "Touch Me in the Morning" and "Funky Feet" were singled out as the best cuts.

=== "Love is the Answer" (single) ===
The single "Love is the Answer" by Van McCoy & The Soul City Symphony was from the album of the same name. On the week of 15 June 1974 "Love is the Answer" by Van McCoy & the Soul City Symphony was in the Record World editor Dede Dabney's Dede's Ditties to Watch list.

On the week of 29 June, "Love is the Answer" debuted at no. 50 in the Billboard Top 50 Easy Listening singles chart.

On the week of 27 July, "Love is the Answer debuted at no. 69 on the Record World R&B Singles chart. On the week of 3 August, "Love is the Answer" debuted at no. 96 in the Record World singles chart. The following week (10 August) the single peaked at no. 92.

On 24 August, "Love is the Answer" was at its second week at no. 51 on the Record World R&B Singles Chart.

Avco Records ran a full-page ad for the single which appeared in the 31 August issue of Billboard. It read "SEX IS NOT THE ANSWER TO EVERYTHING "LOVE IS THE ANSWER" AV 4639 by Van McCoy &The Soul City Symphony". It also had short reports of the song by Tom McLaine, Program Director, CKGM /Montreal, John Bettencourt, Program Director, KL1V /San Jose, Dean Tyler Program Director, WIP /Philadelphia, and Ron Vance Program Director, WING /Dayton. Also that week, at week ten, the song peaked at no. 22 on the Billboard Easy Listening Top 50 chart.

On June 19, 1975, Van McCoy was in Montreal, Canada. He attended a reception at the Limelight night club, which was hosted by Quality Records. There he was presented with a giant award with the inscription, "Presented to Van McCoy by Quality Records Limited, in recognition of "Love Is the Answer" for the song's achieving hit status in Quebec. The function was to also commemorate the first concert appearance of Van McCoy and the Soul City Symphony at the Montreal Forum the following day on the 20th.

=== "Boogie Down" ===
"Boogie Down" backed with "A Rainy Night in Georgia" was released on Avco AV-4648. On the week of 1 February 1975 "Boogie Down" made its debut at no. 91 in the Billboard Hot Soul Singles chart. On the week of 22 February, it peaked at no. 67 on the chart. It spent a total of five weeks in the chart.

=== "The Hustle" ===
"The Hustle" was a Pop Pick in the 12 April 1975 issue of Cash Box. The reviewer said that the song, a Hugo and Luigi production which was arranged and conducted by Van and his Soul City Symphony was a tapestry of vivid colors. The percussive undercurrent was noted and the reviewer said that it added spark to the production. The high chart potential was noted as well.

On the week of 19 July, "The Hustle" was at no. 1 on the Cash Box Top 100 Singles chart.

Pictured on page 16 in the 2 August issue of Cash Box, Van McCoy was with Jim Tyrell, the vice-president of CBS Records. He was at the Seafood Playhouse where F.O.R.E. (Fraternity of Record Executives) had their 4th annual disco party the previous week. With executives from most other record companies present, Avco-Embassy records presented McCoy with his gold record for selling a million copies of "The Hustle". McCoy was also presented with a plaque by F.O.R.E. for his outstanding achievement in the music business. McCoy was also pictured on page 30 in the same issue with Frankie Crocker, holding his gold record for achieving a million and a half sales.

=== Disco Baby (album) ===
The album Disco Baby was also reviewed in the 12 April issue. The album was produced by Hugo & Luigi and released in the US on Avco AV 69006 in April 1975. It was a Cash Box Pop Pick. Referring to the ten tracks on the album as pistol packin' power, the reviewer also said that it would be hard to keep your feet from workin' out. The tracks singled out were, "Disco Baby", "Fire", "Doctor's Orders", "Pick Up the Pieces", and "Get Dancin'".

On the week of 19 April 1975, Disco Baby made its debut on the Cash Box 101 to 175 Albums chart.

On the week of 10 May, Disco Baby debuted in the Cash Box Top 100 albums chart at no. 96.

On the week of 7 June, Disco Baby was at no. 9 in the Cash Box Top 50 R&B Albums chart.

On the week of 28 June, Disco Baby peaked at no. 4 on the Cash Box Top 50 R&B Albums chart.

On the week of 12 July, Disco Baby had moved up from the previous week's position of no 13 to no. 10 on the Cash Box Top 100 Albums chart. It held that position for an additional two weeks.

=== Further activities ===
It was reported by Cash Box in the magazine's 5 July 1975 issue that in the week before, Van McCoy and his Soul City Symphony orchestra made a first-time appearance at the Montreal Forum. The event was a sellout. Also, with "The Hustle" going gold the previous week and it currently at no. 4 with a bullet, Bud Katzel the vice-president an GM for Avco reported that the sales volume was continuing to build.

== Musicians ==
- Bass, Gordon Edwards
- Drums, Herbie Lovelle
- Drums, Rick Marotta
- Guitar, David Spinozza
- Guitar, John Tropea
- Harp, Gloria Agostini
- Keyboards, Leon Pendarvis
- Keyboards, Richard Tee
- Keyboards, Van McCoy
- Horns, Bernie Glow
- Horns, Dominick Gravine
- Horns, Garnett Brown
- Horns, Jim Buffington
- Horns, Marvin Stamm
- Horns, Melvin Lincoln Davis
- Horns, Paul Faulise
- Horns, Robert Alexander
- Horns, Urbie Green
- Horns, Warren Covington
- Vibraphone, Dave Carey
- Vibraphone, George Devens
- Strings: Alfred Brown, Arnold Black, Charles McCracken, David Nadien, Emanuel Green, Emanuel Vardi, Gene Orloff, George Ricci, Harold Kohon, Harry Lookofsky, Joseph Malignaggi, Julien Barber, Kathryn Kienke, Kermit Moore, Max Ellen, Paul Gershman, Phil Bodner (also piccolo), Romeo Penque, Selwart Clarke

== Discography (USA or where otherwise specified) ==
=== Singles ===
- Van McCoy & the Soul City Symphony - "Love Is the Answer" / "Killing Me Softly" - Avco AV-4639 - 1974
- Van McCoy & the Soul City Symphony - "African Symphony" / "Boogie Down" - Avco AVCO 3000X - 1974 (Canada)
- Van McCoy & the Soul City Symphony - "Boogie Down" / "A Rainy Night in Georgia" - Avco AV-4648 - 1974 / 1975
- Van McCoy & the Soul City Symphony - "The Hustle" / "Hey Girl, Come and Get It" - Avco AV-4653 - 1975
- Van McCoy & The Soul City Symphony – "Disco Baby" / "The Hustle" - Avco 16 049 AT (Germany, Netherlands)

=== Albums ===
- Van McCoy & The Soul City Symphony – Love Is the Answer - Avco AV-69002-698 - 1974
- Van McCoy & The Soul City Symphony – Disco Baby - Avco AV-69006 - 1975.
