= Chris Bartley =

Chris Bartley may refer to:

- Chris Bartley (rower) (born 1984), British rower
- Chris Bartley (singer) (1947–2009), American singer
