= Soul Cha Cha =

1976 song by Van McCoy

Song by Van McCoy
- B-side: "African Symphony"
- Released: 1976
- Label: H & L Records 6105 065
- Songwriter(s): V. McCoy
- Producer(s): Van McCoy

"Soul Cha Cha" is a 1976 single for Van McCoy. It was a hit for him in Canada that year and was a hit in the UK the following year. The single was released in the UK on H&L 6105065 in 1977.

== Charts ==
Canada

On the week of November 27, 1976, "Soul Cha Cha" / "The Shuffle" debuted on the RPM Weekly Top Thirty Playlist at no. 18. The following week it was at its peak position of no. 9.

UK

"Soul Cha Cha" made its debut in the UK charts at no. 49 on 12/02/1977. Spending a total of six weeks in the chart, it peaked at no. 34.

== Eddy and the Soulband version ==
"Soul Chacha"

Song by Eddy and the Soulband
- B-side: "In the Night"
- Released: 1983
- Label: Philips 818 237-7
- Songwriter(s): V. McCoy
- Producer(s): Jacques Zwart

Eddy and the Soulband singles chronology
"Soul Chacha" (1983)	"Theme From Shaft" (1984)

Eddy and the Soulband recorded a version which was hit for them in both the Netherlands and Belgium.

=== Background ===
The group covered Van McCoy's "Soul Cha Cha", but their release was spelt "Soulchacha". It was backed with "In the Night". The A and B sides were produced by Jacques Zwart. It was released in the Netherlands on Philips 818 237–7.

=== Charts ===
The single peaked at no. 24 in the Dutch chart during the first quarter of 1984. It was also a hit in Belgium. It spent a total of three weeks in the chart there, peaking at no. 28.
