= Mr. DJ (disambiguation) =

Mr. DJ is an American record producer and disc jockey.

Mr. DJ may also refer to:

- "Mr. DJ" (Sharon Cuneta song), 1978
- "Mr. DJ" (Dr. Alban song), 1997
- "Mr. D. J.", a 1961 song by Van McCoy
