= Solomon King =

American singer (1930–2005)

- Born: Allen Verner Levy; August 13, 1930; Lexington, Kentucky, U.S.
- Died: January 20, 2005 (aged 74) Norman, Oklahoma, U.S.
- Genres: Pop
- Occupation: Singer
- Years active: 1952–2005

Solomon King (born Allen Verner Levy; August 13, 1930 – January 20, 2005) was an American 1960s and 1970s popular music singer. He is best remembered for his 1968 British hit single, "She Wears My Ring", which charted in 40 countries.

== Early life ==
Born Allen Verner Levy in Lexington, Kentucky, as a teenager he attended the Cincinnati Conservatory of Music, and was offered a scholarship to study Cantatorial Music by Jan Peerce.

== Career ==
He first started singing professionally in 1952. Under his first pseudonym, Randy Leeds, his records such as "I'm Gonna Live Til I Die" did not sell. King was the first white singer taken on tour by Billie Holiday, as well as working with Elvis Presley's backing group the Jordanaires, whom he used as his own backing group when recording his first version of "She Wears My Ring" in Nashville, Tennessee.

King's chart success in the UK began with "She Wears My Ring", which was a top three hit there in 1968, and was also a hit in 40 other countries, but failed to reach the US Billboard Hot 100 chart, it did reach number 117 on the Bubbling Under chart, and made number 92 on Cashbox's Top 100. "She Wears My Ring", based on "La Golondrina (The Swallow)" by the Mexican composer Narciso Serradel Sevilla, was written by the Nashville husband and wife team Boudleaux and Felice Bryant. Also in 1968, "When We Were Young", written by songwriting duo Les Reed and Barry Mason was a number 21 hit in the UK Singles Chart. In 1970, he released "This Wonderful Day" (under the name "Levi Jackson") on the Columbia record label which is still popular on the Northern soul scene. In 1972, he released the single "When You've Gotta Go", written by Lynsey de Paul and Ron Roker on the Polydor label and it made the Australian chart, as well as the Dutch "Tipparade", where it peaked at number 17. It received UK radio air play and was covered by Ricki Disoni, a former New Faces contestant.

At 6 feet 8 inches (2.0 m) tall, some television interviewers refused to have him on their shows unless he sat down.

King continued singing in clubs in the United States, after returning in 1980.

== Personal life ==
King married Canadian journalist Henny Lowy in 1960, and they spent 20 years living in Higher Crumpsall, Manchester, England, where the couple had four children. After a divorce with Lowy in 1980, he moved back to the United States, where he wed a further two times.

King died in Norman, Oklahoma, of cancer, on January 20, 2005, at the age of 74.
