= Up in a Puff of Smoke =

Single by Polly Brown
- B-side: "I'm Saving All My Love"
- Released: August 1974 (UK); December 1974 (U.S.)
- Recorded: 1974
- Genre: Pop, Disco
- Length: 3:20
- Label: GTO Records
- Songwriters: Gerry Shury, Phillip Swern
- Producers: Gerry Shury, Phillip Swern

Polly Brown singles chronology
"Up in a Puff of Smoke" (1974)	"You're My Number One" (1974)

"Up in a Puff of Smoke" is a song recorded in 1974 by Polly Brown, released as a non-album single to become an international Top 40 hit in 1975.

== Overview ==
The songwriting/production team of Gerry Shury and Ron Roker had admired Brown's voice from her Pickettywitch recordings. Shury, who had arranged Brown's 1972 self-titled album release, described her as a cross "between Diana Ross and Dionne Warwick". In 1974, Shury and Roker had Brown record the neo-Motown number "Up in a Puff of Smoke". In the same session Brown, with Roker as co-vocalist, recorded a cover of the ABBA song "Honey, Honey", which was released under the name Sweet Dreams.

Canadian blue-eyed soul singer Charity Brown turned down the chance to cover "Up in a Puff of Smoke" for the Canadian market, but she did record the B-side song of the Polly Brown single, the mid-tempo Shury/Swern ballad "I'm Saving All My Love", as "Saving All My Love". Introduced on Brown's 1975 album release Rock Me, the track was released as a single, reaching #61 on the Canadian singles chart in February 1976.

== Chart history ==
"Up in a Puff of Smoke" proved to be a UK Top 40 near miss although it did spend five weeks in the Top 50, peaking at #43. However, the track became a hit in several English speaking countries: Australia (#22), Canada (#11), New Zealand (#13), and the US (#16).

=== Weekly charts ===
Chart (1974–75)	Peak position
Australia (Kent Music Report)	22
Canada RPM Top Singles	11
Canada RPM Adult Contemporary	36
New Zealand	13
UK (The Official Charts Company)	43
U.S. Billboard Hot 100	16
U.S. Billboard Easy Listening	29
U.S. Billboard Dance/Disco	3
U.S. Cash Box Top 100	16

=== Year-end charts ===
Chart (1975)	Rank
Canada	112
US (Joel Whitburn's Pop Annual)	147

== Cover versions ==
- In 2018, Linda Martin remade "Up in a Puff of Smoke", with Nicki French on backing vocals. Issued in January 2018, the track was included on Martin's All Woman album released September 2018.
