= My Favorite Fantasy =

Song by Van McCoy

from the album My Favorite Fantasy
- B-side: "You're So Right for Me"
- Released: April 1978
- Length: 3:18
- Label: MCA 40885
- Songwriter: Van McCoy
- Producers: Van McCoy and Charles Kipps

"My Favorite Fantasy" was a 1978 hit single by American musician, composer and producer Van McCoy. It was from his album of the same name. Featuring McCoy himself on vocals, it charted in the United States, Canada and the UK. It registered in the Billboard Magazine, Cash Box, Record World, RPM Weekly and Record Mirror charts.

== Background ==
"My Favorite Fantasy" comes from McCoy's album My Favorite Fantasy which was made up of original McCoy compositions and was co-produced with Charles Kipps. While "My Favorite Fantasy" was charting, another composition of his, "Don't Pity Me" by Faith Hope & Charity was seeing chart action in the same Billboard and Cash Box charts.

The album was reviewed in the March 25 issue of Billboard. The reviewer noted that McCoy seemed to have mellowed in his direction musically. A Top Album Pick, the songs "That's the Story of My Life", "Two Points", "Before and After", "Wings of Love" plus "You're So Right for Me" etc. were recommended as "Best cuts", but "My Favorite Fantasy" wasn't selected then. Two weeks later, it was in the Soul recommended section of Billboard's Top Single Picks for the week of April 8, 1978.

Released on MCA 40885, the song was one of the Record World Single Picks for April 8, 1978. Referring to the song as a melodic dance number and an r&b natural with wistful and amorous lyrics, the reviewer also noted McCoy's capability as a vocalist and producer. Also in the same issue, along with the sleeper, "Woman to Woman" by Barbara Mandrell and the album, Let's Get Together by the Detroit Emeralds, it was one of the three R&B Picks of the week. The reviewer there noted the strong backbeat which led to heavy danceable rhythm.

The song was also issued on 12" 45.

== Charts and airplay ==
=== Billboard ===
The single debuted at No. 88 on the Billboard Hot Soul Singles chart for the week ending April 29, 1978. From May 20 to June 3 (week 6) it stayed at the peak position of #76. Also on that week, his composition, "Don't Pity Me" by Faith Hope & Charity had made its debut at #85. "My Favorite Fantasy" spent a total of eight weeks in the chart.

=== Cash Box ===
The song made its debut on the Cash Box Top 100 R&B chart on the week ending April 22, 1978. Being noted as one of the R&B Playlist Highlights, it was also seeing a fair amount of radio play action for that week. It was getting spins on Paul Childs' show at WIGO in Atlanta, Don Brooks's show at WWIN in Balitimore, E. Rodney Jones' show at WVON in Chicago, Mike Payne's show at WABQ in Cleveland and several others. It was also noted as the third most added r&b single at WESL, WABQ, KPRS, WJLB and WYLD for that week.

At week 10, on June 24, the song peaked at #51. Also on the same chart that week, "Don't Pity Me" by Faith Hope & Charity was at 46.

=== Record World ===
The single made its debut on the Record World R&B Singles Chart at #67 on April 29, 1978. It peaked at #48 on week 8 on June 17.

=== RPM Weekly ===
By the week of May 27, the single was seeing some airplay in Canada. It was getting spins on the Pierre Borque show at CHRC in Quebec City. It also charted in Canada. On the week of June 10, it was making its debut at #50 on the RPM Adult Oriented Playlist. On the week of June 24 the A side was getting spins on David Collins Carter's show at CKBW in Bridgewater while the B side "You're So Right For Me" was getting spun on Guy Bonnier's show at CHCL in Medley. It was now in its third week and had moved up to #42 on the RPM Adult Oriented Playlist chart. It peaked at #37 on the week of July 15 which was its sixth and final week in the chart.

=== Record Mirror ===
On the week of July 1, the record was getting air play on BRMB Radio. On the week of July 8, the record was one of the five records in the Radio One Record of the Week section, and a pick on Tony Blackburn's show. It was also a hit pick by Steve Hamilton on Radio Forth. By July 15, the record was getting played on Radio Tees.

On the week of July 29, the 12" version issue of the record made its debut in the Record Mirror UK Disco Top 90 chart. Peaking at #70 on August 5, it spent a total of three weeks in the chart. It was still being played on the Radio City Playlist for the final week.

Chart summary (1978)	Peak position
US Billboard Hot Soul Singles	76
US Cash Box Top 100 R&B	51
US Record World R&B Singles	48
Canada RPM Weekly Adult Oriented Playlist	37
UK Record Mirror UK Disco Top 90	70

- The single also came in at no. 10 in the twelve Male Vocalists - Highest Debuts section of the Cash Box 1978 Black Singles Winners.

== Legacy ==
The song has achieved a degree of popularity on the beach music circuit, and was part of the WWER playlist for September 28, 2021, Brian Brewer's Weekend Beach Party on WQFS 90.9 FM for February 24, 2024, the WSGE playlist for September 1, 2024, and the Beach Waves Radio playlist.

The song appears on beach music compilation, The Beach Music Anthology Vol. 3,
