= The Real McCoy (Van McCoy album) =

Studio album by Van McCoy
- Released: 1976
- Label: H & L Records HL-69012-698
- Producer: Van McCoy

Van McCoy chronology
The Disco Kid (1975)	The Real McCoy (1976)	Rhythms of the World (1976)

The Real McCoy is an album released by Van McCoy in 1976. Three songs from the album were hits.

== Background ==
The album was one of Billboard's Top Album Picks for the week ending April 24, 1976. Some of the musicians who performed on the album were Richard Tee, Hugh McCracken, Eric Gale, and Stephen Gadd. It received a good review with the picks being "Love at First Sight", "Night Walk", "Theme from Star Trek", and "African Symphony".

== Charts ==
For the chart dated May 8, 1976, the record entered the Billboard Top LPs & Tape chart at No. 151. At that time, "Jet Setting" was at #9 on the Disco Action chart (Melody Song Shops (Brooklyn, Queens, Long Island) Retail Sales section), "Night Walk" was at #15 (Top Audience Response Record In Houston, Texas Discos section) and "Party" was at (Top Audience Response Records In L.A. /San Diego Discos section). "Night Walk" in its fourth week in the Billboard Hot Soul Singles chart had also moved up from #58 to #52.

For the week ending June 26, the album peaked at No. 106 on the Billboard Top LPs & Tape chart. It peaked on the Billboard R&B Albums chart at No. 22.

== Album info ==
=== Track listing ===
The Real McCoy H & L Records – HL-69012-698
No.	Track	Composer	Time	Notes
A1	"Jet Setting"	Van McCoy	4:14	
A2	"Love At First Sight"	Van McCoy	4:29	
A3	"(To Each His Own) That's My Philosophy"	Van McCoy	4:20	
A4	"Night Walk"	Van McCoy	5:07	
B1	"Sweet, Sweet Rhythm"	Van McCoy	4:40	
B2	"Theme from Star Trek"	Alexander M. Courage - Gene Roddenberry	4:42	
B3	"Party"	Van McCoy	4:17	
B4	"African Symphony"	Van McCoy	4:25	
