= Don't Pity Me =

Song by Faith Hope & Charity

from the album Faith Hope & Charity
- B-side: "Find What You Need"
- Released: 1978
- Label: 20th Century TC-2370
- Songwriter(s): V. McCoy
- Producer(s): Van McCoy

Faith Hope & Charity singles chronology
"Life Goes On" (1977)	"Don't Pity Me" (1978)	"How Can I Help But Love You" (1978)

"Don't Pity Me" was a hit for Faith Hope & Charity in 1978. A Van McCoy composition, it made it onto the Billboard, Cash Box, and Record World music charts.

== Background ==
=== Early version ===
Former 1976 Eurovision British contestant Louisa Jane White recorded a version of the song as the B side of her single "Don't Stop" which was released on Pye 7N 45661 in 1977. It was produced by Gerry Shury and Ron Roker.

=== Faith Hope & Charity version ===
The Faith Hope & Charity single was released on 20th Century TC-2370. In addition to composing the song, Van McCoy also produced it.

With Faith Hope & Charity now consisting of Brenda Hilliard and Albert Bailey, their 1978, self-titled album was their 20th Century Fox debut. In the Billboard review of the album, Adam White commented on the 1970s sound of Van McCoy as reaching its peak of perfection in Faith Hope & Charity. White named "Don't Pity Me" as the album's finest cut. The lead vocal was by Brenda Hilliard. The B side, "Find What You Need" was sung by Albert Bailey.

Two former Faith Hope & Charity members, Zulema and Destry contributed their backing vocals to the album.

While "Don't Pity Me" was seeing chart action, another Van McCoy composition "My Favorite Fantasy by McCoy was seeing action in the same Billboard and Cash Box charts.

== Charts ==
=== Faith Hope & Charity ===
The song made its debut in the Cash Box Top 100 R&B chart on week ending May 27, 1978. On August 12 at week twelve, it peaked at #12.

The song made its debut in the Billboard Hot Soul Singles chart at #85 on the week ending June 3, 1978. On its tenth week it peaked at #20 on week ending August 5.

On the week of June 17, the single made its debut at #68 in the Record World R&B Singles chart. It peaked at #15 on August 12 at its ninth week. It was also in the 101 - 150 Singles chart on July 15 at #141. The following week, July 22, it had entered the Record World Singles chart at #92. It peaked at #84 on August 12.

Chart (1978)	Peak position
US Cash Box Top 100 R&B	12
US Billboard Hot Soul Singles	20
US Record World R&B Singles	15
US Record World 101 - 150 Singles	141
US Record World Singles	84

== Other versions ==
A version was recorded by Thelma Houston and released on Tamla Motown TMG 1117 in 1978.
