= Ron Roker =

English songwriter, singer and record producer (born 1941)

- Born: Ronald Ernest Alfred Roker; 23 January 1941 (age 85)
- Genre: Pop
- Occupations: Songwriter, singer, record producer
- Instrument: Vocals
- Years active: 1970s–present
- Website: ronroker.com

Ronald Ernest Alfred Roker (born 23 January 1941) is an English songwriter, singer and record producer.

Roker has written UK chart hits for Jackie Lee, The Fortunes, Barry Blue, Tina Charles, Polly Brown, The Pearls, The Real Thing and Sweet Dreams.

== Career ==
=== Early 1970s ===
Roker first worked as a song-plugger. His first taste of chart success was provided by the theme music to children's TV programme The Adventures of Rupert Bear. The song "Rupert", co-written with Len Beadle and recorded by Beadle's wife Jackie Lee, made the UK Singles Chart in 1971. He also wrote the theme for Inigo Pipkin (later renamed Pipkins). Further success was attained when Roker met up with Lynsey Rubin (who was about to change her name to Lynsey de Paul). Together they penned "Storm in a Teacup" for The Fortunes, which landed them a Top Ten hit single; "When You've Gotta Go" which made the Dutch Tipparade (peak number 17) in late 1972, as well as the lower reaches of the Australian Aria chart in 1973; and also de Paul's third single, "All Night", which made the UK chart breakers listing in May 1973 and No. 17 on the Dutch Single Tip chart. Together with de Paul, he also wrote "Taking It On" and "It's Been a Long Time", both recorded by the Young Generation on their 1973 album Give Me Love.

Roker also began writing with De Paul's partner Barry Blue, (with whom he is often confused) notably on the song, "Do You Wanna Dance", a Top Ten hit at the end of 1973, as well as some album tracks. The three of them also wrote "Sugarloaf Hill" recorded by reggae artist Del Davis and released on the Trojan record label in 1972. "Sugarloaf Hill" appeared as a track on the 2003 compilation CD Trojan Carnival Box Set.

Moving from pop to a more soulful/dance vein, he was behind the Tina Charles hits "Love Bug" and "Dance Little Lady Dance". His profile in the US benefited from Dionne Warwick recording one of his songs, "Do You Believe in Love at First Sight", and this became the theme song of the film of the same name, starring Dan Aykroyd. "Up in a Puff of Smoke", also written by Roker and recorded by Polly Brown (aka Polly Browne, formerly of Pickettywitch), was a Top 20 hit in America in the 1970s and charted in the UK. Together with Gerry Shury, he wrote "Guilty", which was recorded both by The Pearls and First Choice and was a hit on both sides of the Atlantic.

=== Mid to late 1970s ===
One song he did not write was Sweet Dreams' cover version of the ABBA song "Honey, Honey", although Roker actually sang the male vocal on that record, in a duet with Polly Brown. He also co-wrote and co-produced "Stone Cold Love Affair", a 1975 single by The Real Thing.

Working with Gerry Shury, they produced a record for former 1976 Eurovision British contestant Louisa Jane White. They produced the single, "Don't Stop" which they both composed. It was backed with a Van McCoy and Charles Kipps composition, "Don't Pity Me", released on Pye 7N 45661 in 1977.

Roker together with Blue and Shury also wrote "Devil's Gun", a US and UK chart hit for C. J. & Company. It was the first record played by DJ Richie Kaczor at the opening night of Studio 54 on 26 April, 1977. It was also featured on the soundtrack to The Get Down (Original Soundtrack From The Netflix Original Series). The original version of the song was released in 1973 by Great Expectations. Other versions of "Devil's Gun" were recorded and released by Inner Strength and Blue himself, who released it as a single in 1975.

=== 1980s ===
Working with composers, Biddu and Winston Sela, Roker wrote "Who's Been Kissing You" for the group Hot Cuisine. It became a disco hit for the group in 1981. Decades later, UK group SouLutions would have success with it.

Working with Biddu and Anne Dudley, Roker co-wrote "Ride on a Rhythm for Hot Cuisine. Biddu produced the A side and Roy Carter remixed it. Backed with "Live My Life", it was released on Kaleidoscope Records Limited KRLA 2107 in March 1982. Debuting at No. 62 on the Record Mirror Pop Oriented Dance chart for the week of 10 April 1982, it peaked at No. 54 for the week of 8 May.

In 1983, Roker resurfaced with Jan Pulsford and Phil Wigger as the songwriters of the UK's Eurovision Song Contest entry, "I'm Never Giving it Up". It was recorded by another band called Sweet Dreams, which came in sixth in the song contest. That year his protégé group, Two Way (featuring actor Anthony Head), released a single "Face in the Window", penned by the same writers.

== See also ==
- United Kingdom in the Eurovision Song Contest
