= Funk Filharmonik =

- Origin: Huntington, New York, United States
- Genres: Funk; soul
- Years active: 1985–present
- Labels: 31220 Music

Funk Filharmonik is a long-running a funk and soul outfit from Astoria, New York which has been together since the mid-1980s. The group contains former Tower of Power members. Individually and collectively the group has performed and recorded with major artists.

== History ==
The group was formed in Huntington in 1985. The original name for the group was Funk Philharmonia. Their first show was on November 21, 1985. They are one of the longest-running groups from Long Island. In the late 1990s, there were two former Tower of Power members in its lineup. Two of the founding members were drummer Lee Finkelstein and trombonist and singer, Ozzie Melendez. Melendez has recorded with Celine Dion, Billy Joel, Jennifer Lopez and Lita Ford. Finkelstein has worked with Ben E. King, Donna Summer, Blood, Sweat & Tears, and the Tower of Power. Members of the group have worked with and recorded with artists such as Tito Puente, Willie Colon, Freddie Hubbard, Jonathan Butler, Marc Anthony, Lionel Hampton, and the Brecker Brothers.

In 2008, they released their album Everybody Get Down. Guest musicians on the album included Barry Danielian, Carl Fischer, Jillian Armsbury, Tim Lawless and Ted Kumpel.

In April 2015, the group was appearing with Troy Ramey at K.J. Farrells in Nassau County. In late November 2015, the group was appearing at The Rockville Centre in New York.

== Members ==
- Tom Bowes – Lead Vocals
- Ozzie Melendez – Musical Director, Trombone & Vocals
- Lee Finkelstein – Drums, Band Leader
- Brent Carter – Lead Vocals
- Ron Fox – Trumpet
- Vinnie Cinquemani – Trumpet
- John Scarpulla – Tenor Sax
- Dave Lavender – Guitar
- Chris Karlic – Baritone Sax
- Jack Knight – Bass
- Greg Schleich – Keyboards
- Steve Finkelstein – Percussion
