= Jillian Armsbury =

American singer-songwriter

- Also known as: Jillian Armsbury Pendarvis
- Born: Jill Maureen Armsbury; September 24, 1962; Spokane, Washington
- Died: January 22, 2009 (aged 46)
- Occupations: Musician, vocalist
- Labels: RMM; Shanachie
- Formerly of: Los Jovenes del Barrio
- Spouse(s): Johnny Almendra (divorced); Leon Pendarvis (her death)

Jillian Armsbury (1962-2009) was an American singer-songwriter and activist, originally from Spokane, Washington. She was a pioneer in the Charanga R&B music genre. She was the lead singer of the Latin group Los Jovenes del Barrio. She had worked with the latin jazz percussionist, Mongo Santamaria, singing on an album of his which was released in the late 1980s. She was the co-composer of "Do You Want My Love" which was a hit for CoCo Lee, which appeared on Lee's album Just No Other Way. She was married to bandleader Johnny Almendra and then later to session musician Leon Pendarvis.

== Background ==
Jill Maureen Armsbury was born and raised in Washington and Oregon, and was of German, English, and Scottish ancestry. She had two brothers, Joe and Charles Armsbury, and one sister Erika Armsbury. Her parents divorced when she was 4 years old and her father, activist Charles "Chuck" Armsbury, remarried in 1968 to Sonja Marie Brooks, a black woman with three children. They had two additional children together. Sonja raised all 7 of them. By the age of nine, Jill was doing community theater. A formally trained dancer, she studied dance for some years. Later wanting to do New York Broadway work she realized that dancers were also singing so that led her to study music and singing. She grew up listening to Aretha Franklin, Otis Redding, James Brown, John Coltrane and Motown. She later took the name Jillian Armsbury as her stage name.

Armsbury was married to Johnny Almendra who founded Los Jovenes Del Barrio. At the time of their interview with George Rivera of Jazz Con Clave, they had been together for ten years. The union ultimately was dissolved and she later married Saturday Night Live music director Leon Pendarvis, to whom she remained married until her death.

== Career ==
An article by Jessica Lynne Valiente of the Graduate Center, City University of New York credited Armsbury with the compositions that she contributed, and the artistic persona in her performances for creating a Latin / R&B fusion that was more successful than anything that had ever been tried during the boogaloo era or following it. The group Los Jovenes del Barrio she was in was one of the most important bands in the New York bands in the New York Latin music scene, pushing the barriers as well as extending the musical shape.

=== 1980s - 1990s ===
Armsbury appeared on the Olé Ola album by Mongo Santamaria which was released in 1989. She sang lead on the title song", the Diane Bulgarelli composition Olé Ola" as well having some involvement with Santamaria's composition "La Tumba". In 1996, Los Jovenes Del Barrio released their Evolucionando album. The Billboard reviewer noted her shining performances on the songs "Telephone" and "Stop Slow Down". A similar review was given by Cashbox in the February 10th issue. With the group's experimentation with various Afro-Cuban styles, jazz and R&B, it caused a sensation. In May 1998, along with Baby Zilla, she was appearing at the Downtime in New York. She co-composed the song "Do You Want My Love" which was a hit for Coco Lee in New Zealand and Australia in 1999 making the top 20 in both countries.

=== 2000s ===
Armsbury provided background vocals on Rosie O'Donnell's Another Rosie Christmas album which was released in 2000. She also did background vocal work for the Swedish group Play on their 2003 album, Playin' Around. In May 2007, she was a guest performer with Julia Wade in Wade's "A Canvas of Colors" show at the Laurie Beechman Theatre. She contributed a rap to the Everybody Get Down by Funk Filharmonik, which was released in 2008.

== Activism ==
In 2000, Armsbury volunteered with the Shadow Convention of 2000. She performed with the children’s chorus who were the children orphaned as a result of parents being imprisoned in the war on drugs. In 2001, she was the spokes-woman for the United Musicians Front, a 50-member group of musicians who were protesting against radio stations which included La Mega, who had gone too far to the commercial side and lost touch with the people in New York.

In 2008, she came to the Southeast Missouri State University at the request of its musical director Judith Farris to speak to the students. She shared with them her experience with cancer.

== Death ==
Jillian Armsbury Pendarvis died on January 22, 2009, aged 46, of mesothelioma.

== Legacy ==
In 2009, the Southeast Missouri State University's Department of Theatre and Dance and students dedicated their Sweet Charity musical production to Armsbury. A concert was held in her memory which was in conjunction with the Mesothelioma Applied Research Foundation.

== Discography ==
Albums with Los Jovenes del Barrio
Act	Title	Release info	Year	Notes
Johnny Almendra & Los Jovenes del Barrio	Evolucionando	RMM Records 82006	1996	
Los Jovenes del Barrio	Live	RMM 82253	1998	
Los Jovenes del Barrio	The Best of Los Jovenes del Barrio	RMM 84004	1999	
Johnny Almendra Los Jóvenes del Barrio featuring Jillian	Reconfirmando	RMM 82159 - 1999	1999	
Los Jovenes del Barrio	iEs Diferente	Shanachie 66025	2000	

Appears on
Act	Title	Release info	Year	Notes
Mongo Santamaria	Olé Ola	Concord Picante CCD-4387	1989	
Various artists	RMM 10th Anniversary Concert	RMM 82227	1997	
Funk Filharmonik	Everybody Get Down	31220 Music/337	2008	
