= Amigo (Black Slate song) =

Single by Black Slate

from the album Amigo
- B-side: "Black Slate Rock"
- Released: September 1980
- Recorded: 1980
- Studio: Gooseberry Sound Studios
- Genre: Reggae
- Length: 4:05 (7"); 5:33 (original album version); 6:44 (12")
- Label: Ensign
- Songwriter(s): Anthony Brightly; Chris Hanson; Cledwyn Rogers; Desmond Mahoney; Elroy Bailey; Keith Drummond
- Producer(s): Black Slate

Black Slate singles chronology
"Mind Your Motion" (1979)	"Amigo" (1980)	"Boom Boom" (1980)

"Amigo" is a 1980 reggae song by UK band Black Slate. It reached No.9 in the UK and New Zealand charts. Its success emphasized Black Slate's prominence as one of the few UK-grown reggae bands. It was followed with international tours that included Europe and New Zealand.

== Track listings ==
7"

1. "Amigo" – 4:05
2. "Black Slate Rock" – 3:14

7" (Vertigo, Canada)

1. "Amigo" – 3:33
2. "Live Up to Love" – 4:15

12"

1. "Amigo" – 6:44
2. "Black Slate Rock" – 4:38

== Charts ==
Chart (1980–81)	Peak position
Belgium (Ultratop 50 Flanders)	21
Ireland (IRMA)	12
Netherlands (Dutch Top 40)	15
Netherlands (Single Top 100)	20
New Zealand (Recorded Music NZ)	9
UK Singles (OCC)	9
