= Sweet Dreams (1970s band) =

English studio group

- Origin: London, England
- Genres: Pop, disco
- Years active: 1974–1977
- Label: Bradley's Records
- Members: Polly Brown; Tony Jackson; Robert Young; Stuart Armstrong; Steve Parkes; Kim and Kerry

Sweet Dreams were an English studio group who scored a hit single in 1974 with a cover of the ABBA song "Honey Honey".

== Career ==
In 1974, former Pickettywitch member and session backing vocalist Polly Brown recorded a cover of an ABBA album track, "Honey Honey". This was produced by Ron Roker and Gerry Shury, with the former also supplying the male vocal on the track.

Tony Jackson^{1} was recruited to act as a partner for Brown in their performances for the single. Jackson, born in Barbados 17 March 1944, had moved to London in 1965 and spent five years as a member of reggae outfit the Skatalites who had the No. 36 hit "Guns of Navarone" in 1967. Before being recruited by Roker to partner Brown live and on Sweet Dreams' post-"Honey Honey" recordings, Jackson had spent some time fronting Gulliver's People, the house band at the Shaftesbury Avenue, London nightclub Tiffany's. Jackson and Brown appeared on TOTP performing "Honey, Honey" and subsequently recorded tracks to complete a Sweet Dreams album entitled We'll Be Your Music.

"Honey Honey" entered the UK Top 50 at No. 46 on the chart dated 20 July 1974. It eventually rose to a No. 10 peak at the end of August. It also reached No. 14 in the Republic of Ireland. Outside the UK, the Sweet Dreams version of "Honey Honey" was bested by the single release of the ABBA original, although the Sweet Dreams version did enter the charts in Germany and the US despite ABBA's version being a greater success in both markets. Sweet Dreams' "Honey Honey" reached No. 42 in Germany and No. 68 in the US where ABBA's version reached respectively No. 2 and #27.

To join Brown and Jackson in Sweet Dreams' live performances, Roker and Shury recruited the line-up of Love Lane, the house band at the La Dolce Vita club Birmingham & various "Tiffanys" venues, specifically Robert Young (born Robert Parkes (drums/vocals ) Stuart Armstrong,(keyboards/vocals) and Stephen Parkes,(bass/vocals) plus the duo Kim and Kerry (guitar/vocals) who were John Brindley and Marie. Unusually for the time, the band travelled and used a "Mellotron" and "Moog" synths and could create a full and almost "as per record" sound in their live performances. Sweet Dreams made their live debut opening for the Three Degrees at the Southport Theatre. Brown sometimes performed as Sweet Dreams' vocalist in blackface and was billed as Sara Leone, a reference to the African country Sierra Leone.

Brown and Jackson had six single releases as Sweet Dreams, the rest of which were overlooked. Sweet Dreams had their highest post-"Honey Honey" profile when Brown and Jackson competed in the 1976 A Song for Europe bidding to represent the UK at that year's Eurovision with the song "Love Kiss and Run" a Barry Blue/ Stephen Worth composition which placed fourth. Roker and Shury were not associated with this Sweet Dreams project, but did contribute another Song for Europe entrant "Do You Believe in Love at First Sight" which was performed by Brown solo (Roker and Shury having produced solo records for Brown concurrently with recording her in Sweet Dreams)^{2} – to finish tenth. (That year's Eurovision UK entrant and eventual Eurovision winner was Brotherhood of Man's "Save Your Kisses for Me".) Brown' solo recordings were released on the GTO label where Jackson also had a 1975 single: "As if by Magic", produced by Roker and Shury.

Jackson sang the theme song for the 1976 film The Cassandra Crossing and pursued a session singing career notably on the hits "Knock on Wood" by Amii Stewart, "Every Time You Go Away" by Paul Young and "Wishing Well" by Terence Trent D'Arby. Jackson continued to cut occasional solo tracks including a 1994 disco version of "(Everything I Do) I Do It for You" credited to Q(11) featuring Tony Jackson.

Sweet Dreams would later be the name of another group, who represented the UK at Eurovision 1983, with "I'm Never Giving Up". By an apparent coincidence, the song by this male/female group – a totally different outfit – a trio with two females and one male – was co-written by Ron Roker.

== Discography ==
Singles

- July 1974 – "Honey Honey" (Bradley's) (UK No. 10, IRL No. 14, GER No. 42, CAN #59, US #68, AUS #38)
- January 1975 – "The Best of Everything" (Bradley's)
- August 1975 – "Let's Get into Something" (Bradley's)
- October 1975 – "I'll Be Your Music" (Bradley's)
- March 1976 "Love Kiss and Run" (Bradley's)
- February 1977 "Hollywood (Disco Star)" (Pye)

Album

- 1975 – We'll Be Your Music (Bradley's)

== Notes ==
- ^1 Not to be confused with the lead singer of the Searchers.
- ^2 Brown's solo hit "Up in a Puff of Smoke" was in fact recorded in the same session as Sweet Dreams' "Honey Honey".
