= Disco Baby =

Studio album by Van McCoy & the Soul City Symphony
- Released: 1975
- Recorded: Mediasound, New York City
- Genres: Disco, R&B, soul
- Label: Avco
- Producer: Hugo & Luigi

Van McCoy chronology
| Love Is the Answer (1974) | Disco Baby (1975) | The Disco Kid (1975) |

Professional ratings
Review scores
| Source | Rating |
|---|---|
| AllMusic | 3/5 stars |

Disco Baby is the second studio album recorded by Van McCoy & the Soul City Symphony, released in 1975 on the Avco label.

== History ==
The album reached No. 12 on the Billboard Top LPs chart and topped the Billboard Soul LPs chart. The album features the single, "The Hustle", which peaked at No. 1 on the Billboard Hot 100 and Hot Soul Singles charts.

== Track listing ==
Side one
| No. | Title | Writer(s) | Length |
|---|---|---|---|
| 1. | "Disco Baby" | Hugo & Luigi, George David Weiss | 3:40 |
| 2. | "Fire" | James Williams, Clarence Satchell, Leroy Bonner, Billy Beck, Marshall Jones, Ralph Middlebrooks, Marvin Pierce | 3:32 |
| 3. | "The Hustle" | Van McCoy | 4:05 |
| 4. | "Get Dancin'" | Bob Crewe, Kenny Nolan | 3:33 |
| 5. | "Doctor's Orders" | Geoff Stephens, Roger Greenaway, Roger Cook | 3:06 |

Side two
| No. | Title | Writer(s) | Length |
|---|---|---|---|
| 6. | "Turn This Mother Out" | Van McCoy | 3:12 |
| 7. | "Shakey Ground" | Jeffrey Bowen, Eddie Hazel, Alphonso Boyd | 3:22 |
| 8. | "Spanish Boogie" | Van McCoy | 3:33 |
| 9. | "Pick Up the Pieces" | Roger Ball, Hamish Stuart, Average White Band | 4:47 |
| 10. | "Hey Girl, Come and Get It" | Hugo & Luigi, George David Weiss | 3:14 |

== Personnel ==
- Van McCoy: Vocals, piano
- Steve Gadd, Rick Marotta – Drums
- Gordon Edwards – bass
- Eric Gale, Hugh McCracken – guitar
- Richard Tee – piano
- Arthur Jenkins, Jr. – percussion
- Leroy Leon Pendarvis, Jr. – clavinet, piano
- George Degens – rhythm and lead guitar
- Ken Bichel; Synthesizers
- Philip Bodner (also piccolo), Melvyn Davis, Bernie Glow, Marvin Stamm, Wayne Andre, Garnett Brown, Paul Faulise, Urbie Green, Robert Alexander, Seldon Powell, Michael Rod, Romeo Penque, William Slapin, Frank Wess – horns
- Gene Orloff, Kermit Moore, George Ricci, Harold Kohon, Joseph Malignaggi, Max Pollikoff, Theodore Israel, Selwart Clarke, Emanuel Green, Emanuel Vardi, Julien Barber, Harry Lookofsky, Matthew Raimondi, Kathryn Kienke – strings
- Brenda Hilliard, Albert Bailey – background vocals

== Charts ==
| Chart (1975) | Peak |
|---|---|
| Australia (Kent Music Report) | 33 |
| Canada Top Albums/CDs (RPM) | 11 |
| U.S. Billboard Top LPs | 12 |
| U.S. Billboard Top Soul LPs | 1 |

Singles

| Year | Single | Peak chart positions | | | | |
| Year | Single | US | US R&B | US A/C | US Dan | AUS |
|---|---|---|---|---|---|---|
| 1975 | "The Hustle" | 1 | 1 | 2 | 3 | 9 |

== Certifications ==
| Region | Certification | Certified units/sales |
|---|---|---|
| Canada (Music Canada) | Gold | 50,000^{^} |
| Hong Kong (IFPI Hong Kong) | Platinum | 20,000^{*} |
^{*} Sales figures based on certification alone.^{^} Shipments figures based on certification alone.

== See also ==
- List of Billboard number-one R&B albums of 1975
