= Right on the Tip of My Tongue =

Single by Brenda & the Tabulations
- B-side: "Always & Forever"
- Released: January 6, 1971
- Genre: Soul
- Length: 3:18
- Label: Top and Bottom
- Songwriters: Van McCoy, Joe Cobb
- Producers: Gilda C. Woods, Van McCoy

Brenda & the Tabulations singles chronology
"A Child No One Wanted" (1970)	"Right on the Tip of My Tongue" (1971)	"A Part of You" (1971)

"Right on the Tip of My Tongue" is a song written by Van McCoy and Joe Cobb and performed by Brenda & the Tabulations. It reached #10 on the U.S. R&B chart and #23 on the U.S. pop chart in 1971.

The song was arranged by Van McCoy and produced by McCoy and Gilda Woods.

This song is noted for lead singer Brenda Payton's spoken recitation in the Coda section, which leads to the song's surprising end.

The song ranked #97 on Billboard magazine's Top 100 singles of 1971.

== Chart history ==
=== Weekly charts ===
Chart (1971)	Peak position
Australia	53
Canada RPM Top Singles	83
U.S. Billboard Hot 100	23
U.S. Billboard R&B	10
U.S. Cash Box Top 100	14

=== Year-end charts ===
Chart (1971)	Rank
U.S. Billboard Hot 100	97
