= The Sweetest Thing This Side of Heaven =

Single by Chris Bartley

from the album The Sweetest Thing This Side of Heaven
- B-side: "Love Me Baby"
- Released: July 1967
- Genre: Soul, R&B
- Label: Vando
- Songwriter: Van McCoy
- Producer: Van McCoy

"The Sweetest Thing This Side of Heaven" is a love song by Chris Bartley, written and produced by Van McCoy. It was the title track of his Bartley's first LP, and became his only hit single. He was 17 at the time of its recording, and 18 at the time it became a hit.

"The Sweetest Thing This Side of Heaven" became a hit during the summer of 1967. It reached number 32 on the U.S. Billboard Hot 100. It was a much bigger R&B hit, reaching number 10 in the U.S. and number 14 in Canada.

== Chart history ==
Chart (1967)	Peak position
Canada RPM R&B	14
U.S. Billboard Hot 100	32
U.S. Billboard R&B	10
U.S. Cash Box Top 100	35

== Cover versions ==
"The Sweetest Thing This Side of Heaven" was covered by The Presidents and released as a single in the spring of 1971. Their version, however, failed to chart.
