= Kendra Spotswood =

American singer

- Also known as: Sandi Sheldon; Kenni Woods
- Born: Kendra Spotswood
- Origin: Englewood, New Jersey, United States
- Genres: Soul, R&B, pop
- Occupation: Singer
- Years active: 1963–
- Labels: Okeh, Philips

Kendra Spotswood is an American soul singer and is considered to be one of the most underrated singers of the girl group era. She is known best for her collaboration with Van McCoy, her brief stint with The Shirelles and her song "You're Gonna Make Me Love You" a favorite on the UK Northern soul scene, which she recorded under the name Sandi Sheldon.

== Career ==
Aged 18 in 1963, she made her professional debut singing backup with the Four Buddies' fronted by Van McCoy on their song "Lonely Summer". Recording on the Philips label as Kenni Woods her solo debut, "Can't He Take a Hint," followed in the same year. Her next single was "Back with My Baby"; her backing singers were Dee Dee Warwick, Cissy Houston and Doris Troy. Spotswood performed with The Shirelles, filling in for Beverly Lee during their performances with the group from 1964-1966 but did not record with them as she was still under contract with Philips. During that time, she and McCoy, her boyfriend at the time, collaborated and co-wrote several singles using a number of aliases, including the Pacettes' "You Don't Know Baby," Jack & Jill's "Two of a Kind," and the Fantastic Vantastics' "Gee What a Boy". In 1965, her "Stickin' With My Baby," the only record using her birth name. She also sang backing vocals with Van McCoy on the Barbara Lewis song Baby, I'm Yours.

=== Northern soul ===
Spotswood used the alias Sandi Sheldon for 1967's "You're Gonna Make Me Love You" on Okeh; the single making little impact on release. After the same fate met 1968's "Touch My Heart," credited to the Vonettes and released on the Cobblestone label, she relocated to Atlanta and retired from the music business.

"You're Gonna Make Me Love You" was rediscovered in the 1970s; one theory is that it was among a number of singles sold by BBC Radio One DJ John Peel to record dealer Graham Stapleton, who in turn sold it to "Froggy" Taylor, then the DJ at the influential Northern soul nightspot The Twisted Wheel. An alternative view according to Northern soul DJ Ian Levine is that it was bought by fellow Northern soul DJ Rob Bellars while working in California and brought back to the UK where it became the epitome of a rare, fast Northern soul classic. The song met with wide approval, and it remains a Northern soul favorite to this day, quoted as one of the crown jewels of the Northern soul club scene. Spotswood's whereabouts and real name remained unknown for decades until she finally learned of her latter-day fame on the Northern soul circuit and began appearing again to live audiences.
