= The Spellbinders =

American soul band (1960s)

- Origin: New Jersey
- Genres: Soul
- Years active: 1960s
- Past members: Bobby Shivers; Elouise Pennington; Dee Grant; Jimmy Wright; McArthur Munford

The Spellbinders was a New Jersey–based soul group comprising Bobby Shivers, Elouise Pennington, Dee Grant, Jimmy Wright, and McArthur Munford.

Best known for their recordings with Van McCoy, Ken Williams, and David Kapralik, The Spellbinders had moderate chart success in the U.S., Canada, and the United Kingdom, with their first single "For You" reaching No. 23 on the US Billboard R&B charts and No. 93 on the pop charts.

The band toured the U.S. and Canada with acts like Arthur Conley, Joe Tex, and Jackie Wilson, as well as the UK in 1965 and 1966, appearing at the legendary Northern Soul venue, the Manchester Twisted Wheel. Jimi Hendrix, who lived in London at the time, made the journey northwards to see them there. The group also appeared on Top of the Pops, a UK pop TV program. Their recordings "Chain Reaction" and "Help Me" were very popular on the UK Northern Soul scene.

The group split up in the late 1960s, and it was not until 2005 that Chris Lalor, a British citizen living in Belgium, contacted them to arrange a reunion. This resulted in The Spellbinders appearing at the New Jersey Soul Trip USA, organized by Kev Roberts.

Their only album, The Magic of the Spellbinders, is considered by many soul fans to be one of the finest soul albums of the 1960s. It was rated 3.5 out of 5 stars by Richie Unterberger of AllMusic.

McArthur Munford died in September 2006, aged 63, and Dee Grant died in December 2007. Bobby Shivers owns the name Spellbinders and still performs with three backing singers in the U.S. and the UK.

== Selected discography ==
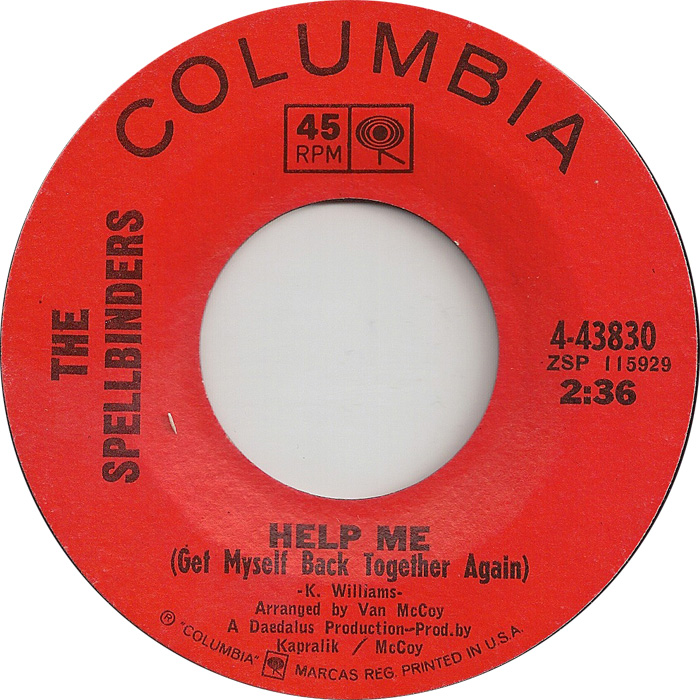
The Spellbinders, "Help Me", Columbia 4-43830

Title	Year	Peak chart positions (Note: As of now, chart data for the UK and Canada are not able to be retrieved from a list.)	Album
Title	Year	US	Album
"For You"	1965	93	The Magic Of (1966)
"Chain Reaction"	1965	— (Note: "Chain Reaction" did not reach the Hot 100, but peaked at No. 18 on the Bubbling Under Hot 100.)	The Magic Of (1966)
"We're Acting Like Lovers"	1966	— (Note: "We're Acting Like Lovers" did not reach the Hot 100, but peaked at No. 30 on the Bubbling Under Hot 100.)	The Magic Of (1966)
"Help Me"	1966	100	—N/a
