= When You've Gotta Go =

Single by Solomon King
- Released: 1972
- Songwriters: Lynsey Rubin; Ron Roker

"When You've Gotta Go" was written by Lynsey de Paul (credited to her birth name, Lynsey Rubin) and Ron Roker. It was recorded by Solomon King at 10cc's Strawberry Studios and produced by Harvey Lisberg and released as a single in July 1972. The single was a chart hit in Australia in early 1973, and also spent four weeks on the Dutch "Tipparade", peaking at No. 17. It also appeared on the Polydor compilation album Doppel Pop Tops 3.

Another version of the song was also released as a single in Australia by Jay Justin (a regular on national TV shows Bandstand and the Johnny O'Keefe Show), in November 1973 on the RCA label. Filipino singer Joe Alvarez, also released a version of the song on his 1973 album, Mr. Musicman. Eddie Mesa, often referred to as the Elvis Presley of the Philippines, also recorded his version of the song as the first track on his 1973 album, The Total Performer and this was also released as a single.

In 1974, the British vocalist, Ricki Disoni (a.k.a. Gordon Waddison, a former winner of ATV's talent show New Faces, and a regularly appearing artist at venues such as The Night Out Theatre Restaurant), released his recording of the song, produced by Dave Richardson, as a track on his UK album, This Is Ricki Disoni.

== Cover versions with lyrics in other languages ==
The song was covered by German artist and producer Frank Farian in 1973 as "Was kann schöner sein", with German lyrics by Fred Jay and released as a single as well as a track on his 1973 album, So Muß Liebe Sein. He performed the song on the German TV programme ZDF Hitparade on 17 February, 1973 and it reached No. 48 on the German singles chart on the 16 March that year. His version of the song was featured on a number of hit compilation albums as on CD for the first time in 2009 on the compilation album, Frank Farian – Das beste aus 40 Jahren ZDF Hitparade and is listed as one of Farian's song highlights by AllMusic.

The song was also recorded as a track by Jürgen Marcus on his albums, Ein Festival Der Liebe. and "Ein Festival Der Liebe" but with the title "Was Auf Dieser Welt Kann Schöner Sein". The duo Wyn Hoop & Andrea Horn also recorded "Was kann schöner sein" and released it as a single in Austria and Germany on Decca Records. This version of the song was also released on the Telefunken compilation album, Die Grosse Star Und Schlagerrevue 10.

A Finnish version of the song entitled "Kun Mentävä On" with lyrics by Pertti Reponen was released by the artist Danny as the B-side to his single "Yksinäinen Ilta", as well as the title track on his 1973 album.

A Spanish version of the song with the title "Adios Amigo" (albeit with lyrics partially in English) was also recorded and released as a single by the pop group Los Albas in 1972, as well as a track on their self-titled album in 1974 and their 1977 album La Hora Más Cuerda Del Verano Más Loco. It was also released on a Los Albas greatest hits album collection in 2022.
