= The Hustle (song) =

Single by Van McCoy & the Soul City Symphony

from the album Disco Baby
- B-side: "Hey Girl, Come and Get It"
- Released: April 18, 1975
- Recorded: 1975
- Studio: Mediasound, New York City
- Genre: Disco; dance
- Length: 3:29 (single version); 4:10 (album version)
- Label: Avco
- Songwriter: Van McCoy
- Producers: Hugo Peretti, Luigi Creatore

Music video
- "The Hustle" on YouTube

"The Hustle" is a disco song by songwriter-arranger Van McCoy and the Soul City Symphony. It went to No. 1 on the U.S. Billboard Hot 100 and Hot Soul Singles charts during the summer of 1975. It also peaked at No. 1 on the Canadian RPM charts, No. 9 on the Australian Singles Chart (Kent Music Report) and No. 3 in the UK. It would eventually sell over one million copies. The song won the Grammy Award for Best Pop Instrumental Performance early in 1976 for songs recorded in 1975.

== History ==
While in New York City to make an album, Van McCoy composed the song after his music partner, Charles Kipps, watched patrons do a dance known as "the Hustle" in the nightclub "Adam's Apple." The sessions were done at New York's Mediasound Studios with pianist McCoy, bassist Gordon Edwards, drummer Steve Gadd, keyboardist Richard Tee, guitarists Eric Gale and John Tropea, and orchestra leader Gene Orloff. Producer Hugo Peretti contracted multi-woodwind player Phil Bodner to play the piccolo lead melody.

On the week of May 16, 1975, "The Hustle" entered the Radio & Records Trend chart at no. 38. The following week, "The Hustle" entered the Radio & Records Pop/30 chart at no. 30.

During the summer of 1975, "The Hustle" became a No. 1 hit on the Billboard Hot 100 and Hot Soul Singles charts. Billboard ranked it as the No. 22 song for 1975. It also peaked at No. 9 on the Australian Singles Chart (Kent Music Report) and No. 3 in the UK Singles Chart. On popular New York City Top 40 station 770 WABC, "The Hustle" was the #1 song for the year 1975, after spending five weeks in the top spot on WABC's weekly charts.

According to producers Hugo & Luigi, who owned the Avco record label that originally released "The Hustle", McCoy met with them shortly before his death in 1979. He wanted to discuss ideas for a new, longer version of the song, in order to appease Avco's UK and German affiliates who were clamoring for a 12" disco single release. The new version, clocking in at just under six and a half minutes, was assembled posthumously as a remix, using parts of the original recording plus new parts, including drum, Syndrum, and a "little" Moog synthesizer. It was credited to Van McCoy alone or with an unnamed orchestra, mixed by "The Mix Masters", identity unknown.

== Appearances in other media ==
The song has been featured in numerous movies, such as Stuck on You, Vampires Suck, and The Lorax, and television shows including the Shark Tale short film Club Oscar, That '70s Show, One Day at a Time, Speechless, American Dad!, and Futurama.

== Charts ==
=== Weekly charts ===
Chart (1975)	Peak position
Australia (Kent Music Report)	9
Austrian Singles Chart	13
Belgium (Flanders) Singles Chart	3
Canada Top Singles (RPM)	1
Canada RPM Adult Contemporary	1
Dutch Top 40	4
French Singles Chart SNEP	30
French Singles Chart IFOP	32
German Singles Chart	3
Ireland (IRMA)	5
New Zealand Singles Chart	5
South Africa (Springbok)	5
Spain (Los 40 Principales)	1
UK Singles Chart	3
US Billboard Hot 100	1
US Billboard Hot Soul Singles	1
US Billboard Adult Contemporary	2
US Cash Box Top 100	1

=== Year-end charts ===
Chart (1975)	Rank
Australia (Kent Music Report)	78
Canada	9
New Zealand	19
UK	16
US Billboard Hot 100	21
US Cash Box Top 100	18

== Certifications and sales ==
Region	Certification	Certified units/sales
Canada (Music Canada)	Gold	75,000^{^}
Japan	—	500,000
United Kingdom (BPI)	Silver	250,000^{^}
United States (RIAA)	Gold	1,000,000^{^}
^{^} Shipments figures based on certification alone.

== Other versions ==
Italian rapper Talko made a rap cover of "The Hustle". It was released in 1983 on Babalu Records.

Filipino comedienne Rufa Mae Quinto covered this song as "Booba (Do The Hustle)", which served as the theme song of the 2001 film Booba. Her version was included on her album Rated R from Viva Records.

In 2023 the American composer Joseph Shirley covered this song as "Hustle Dimension", which appeared in the 2023 DreamWorks Animation American animated jukebox musical comedy film Trolls Band Together.
