= To Each His Own (Faith, Hope & Charity song) =

Single by Faith Hope & Charity

from the album Faith Hope & Charity
- B-side: "Find a Way"
- Released: 1975
- Genre: Soul, Disco
- Length: 3:23 (7" version); 5:16 (Album version)
- Label: RCA
- Songwriter(s): Van McCoy
- Producer(s): Van McCoy

"To Each His Own" is a 1975 dance/R&B single by trio, Faith, Hope & Charity. The single was an early disco favorite, hitting the top 20 on the disco chart peaking at number fifteen. "To Each His Own" was a number-one R&B hit for one week in late 1975 and also peaked at number fifty on the Billboard Hot 100 pop chart. It was composed by Van McCoy who arranged and conducted the original recording.

== Chart history ==
Chart (1975)	Peak position
Canada	58
New Zealand	28
U.S. Billboard Hot 100	50
U.S. Hot Disco Singles	15
U.S. Billboard Hot Soul Singles	1

== Other versions ==
- Enoch Light and The Light Brigade also recorded this song, which appears on their Big Hits of the 70s album.
- Van McCoy, who composed the song, recorded it for his The Real McCoy album. The album also featured Faith Hope & Charity members Brenda Hilliard, Albert Bailey, Diane Destry on background vocals well as Jocelyn Shaw, Lorraine Moore and Roberta Blassingame.

== Discography ==
- Faith Hope & Charity - "To Each His Own" / "Find A Way" - RCA Victor - RCA 2599 - (1975)
- Faith Hope & Charity - "To Each His Own" / "Find A Way" - RCA Victor PB 10343, 26.11319 - (1975) - (Germany)
- Van McCoy - Van McCoy - "To Each His Own" (That's My Philosophy) / "The Walk" - H & L Records 17743 AT - (1977) - (Netherlands)

=== Appears On ===
- Enoch Light - Big Hits of the 70s, Vol 2 - Project 3 PR 6016 SD - [1975] (LP)
- Van McCoy - The Real McCoy - H & L Records HL-69012-698 - [1976] - (LP)
