= Love Is the Answer (Stylistics song) =

1974 song by soul group The Stylistics

"Love Is the Answer" is a song that was recorded by The Stylistics and appeared on their album Let's Put It All Together that was released in 1974. An instrumental version was released by Van McCoy & the Soul City Symphony and became a hit for the ensemble that year.

== Van McCoy version ==
"Love Is the Answer"

Song by Van McCoy & the Soul City Symphony
- B-side: "Killing Me Softly"
- Released: 1974
- Length: 3:22
- Label: Avco AV-4639
- Songwriters: George David Weiss, Hugo & Luigi
- Producers: Hugo & Luigi

=== Background ===
The Van McCoy & the Soul City Symphony version of "Love is the Answer" appears on the album of the same name. Backed with "Killing Me Softly", it was released on Avco 4639.

Avco Records ran a full-page ad for the single which appeared in the 31 August issue of Billboard. It read "SEX IS NOT THE ANSWER TO EVERYTHING "LOVE IS THE ANSWER" AV 4639 by Van McCoy &The Soul City Symphony". It also had short reports of the song by Tom McLaine, Program Director, CKGM /Montreal, John Bettencourt, Program Director, KL1V /San Jose, Dean Tyler Program Director, WIP /Philadelphia, and Ron Vance Program Director, WING /Dayton.

=== Reception ===
Music editor for Record World, Dede Dabney had the song in her Dede's Ditties to Watch list for the week of 15 June 1974.

=== Airplay ===
On the week of Friday 26 July, Radio & Records had the song on the KLIV parallels list and WBGN parallels list. It was also at 31-23 on WCOL.

On the week of 9 August, Radio & Records had the song in the parallel 2 list for WFIR at Roanoke and the parallel 3 list for WBGN at Bowling Green. It was also an ad on at WBGN, 20-19 at WCOL, 40-33 at KEEL, and an ad at WFIR.

=== Charts ===
==== Billboard Top 50 Easy Listening singles chart ====
On the week of 29 June, "Love is the Answer" debuted at no. 50 in the Billboard Top 50 Easy Listening singles chart. Having been in the chart for ten weeks, song would peak at no. 22 the week of 31 August.

==== Radio & Records POP / MOR chart ====
On the week of 26 July, "Love is the Answer" made its debut in the Radio & Records Pop / MOR chart.

==== Record World R&B Singles chart ====
On the week of 27 July, "Love is the Answer debuted at no. 69 on the Record World R&B Singles chart. On the week of 17 August, "Love is the Answer" was at the peak position of no. 51, and held the position for one more week.

==== Record World singles chart ====
On the week of 3 August, "Love is the Answer" debuted at no. 96 in the Record World singles chart. The following week (10 August) the single peaked at no. 92.

==== Cash Box Top 100 Singles chart ====
On the week of 24 August, "Love is the Answer" debuted at no. 100 in the Cash Box Top 100 Singles chart.

=== Awards ===
On June 19, 1975, Van McCoy was in Montreal, Canada, where he attended a reception at the Limelight night club which was hosted by Quality Records. There he was presented with a giant award with the inscription, "Presented to Van McCoy by Quality Records Limited, in recognition of "Love Is the Answer" for the song's achieving hit status in Quebec. The function was to also commemorate the first concert appearance of Van McCoy and the Soul City Symphony at the Montreal Forum the following day on the 20th.
