= I'm Not Dreaming =

Song by Zulema

from the album Z-Licious
- B-side: "Gotta Find a Way"
- Released: 1978
- Length: 3:23
- Label: Lejoint; 5N-34002
- Songwriter: V. McCoy
- Producer: Van McCoy

"I'm Not Dreaming" is a song performed by the American singer Zulema in 1978.

== Background ==
The song, "I'm Not Dreaming", was written and produced by Van McCoy. Backed with her own composition, "Gotta Find a Way" was released on LeJoint 5N-34002 in 1978. The album of the same name was reviewed by Cash Box in the November 4, 1978 issue. The two tracks selected by the magazine were ballads, "Praying for a Miracle" and "I'm Not Dreaming".

Appearing in the soul section of Billboard's Top Soul Picks for the week of January 20, 1979, the single received a warm review. The unnamed friend singing in duet with Zulema was actually Van McCoy. In assessment of the release in a duet format, the reviewer put it on par with other "silky, romantic" recent hit recordings by Johnny Mathis & Deniece Williams, and Roberta Flack & Donny Hathaway.

It had been reviewed earlier that month as well by Cash Box in the magazine's January 6 issue. Along with "I Go to Rio" by Pablo Cruise, "Dancin'" by Grey & Hanks and "Living in a Dream" by Sea Level, it was one of the four Feature Picks for that week. The reviewer noted that both singers known in the disco genre had a release that was pure MOR pop. The potential to appeal to a wide range of formats was also noted.

The song appears on her album, Z-Licious (Lejoint – LEJ 17000) which was made up of three Van McCoy compositions and eight of her own.

== Charts ==
The song debuted at No. 95 on the Billboard Hot Soul Singles chart for the week ending February 3, 1979. It peaked at #76 at week seven on March 17, and held the position for another week, spending a total of nine weeks in the chart.

For the week of February 10, the song debuted at No. 97 on the Cash Box Top 100 R&B chart and peaked at No. 86. It spent a total of eight weeks in the Top 100 R&B chart.
