= Mr. D. J. =

Song by Van McCoy
- A-side: "Never Trust a Friend"
- B-side: "Mr. D. J."
- Released: 1961
- Label: Rock'n Records 101
- Songwriter: V. McCoy

Mr. D. J. was the first solo hit for Van McCoy. It made it into the Cash Box and Billboard Music Week charts. It was actually the B side of "Never Trust a Friend".

== Background ==
Released on McCoy's own label, Rock'n Records, it was released as "Never Trust a Friend" / "Mr. D. J.. The song is about dedicating a song to a lady that doesn't know that the requester cares for her. The requester hopes that she'll hear the song and know who it is. The requester takes this route as he is too shy to confess his feelings to her.

== Chart ==
On July 8, 1961, the single entered the Cash Box Looking Ahead chart at no. 42, then peaking at no. 5 on August 19.

On the week of September 25, the single was at no. 104 in the Billboard Music Week Bubbling Under The Hot 100 chart. It spent another week in the chart at no. 119.

For the week of October 16, 1961, the single was listed by Billboard Music Week as one of the top market breakouts in Philadelphia.
