= Zulema =

American singer

Background information
- Also known as: Ms. Z
- Born: Zulema Cusseaux; January 3, 1947
- Origin: Tampa, Florida, U.S.
- Died: September 30, 2013 (aged 66)
- Genres: R&B, soul
- Years active: 1966–1982
- Labels: Sussex, RCA, LeJoint, The Sound Of Brooklyn
- Formerly of: Faith, Hope and Charity

Zulema Cusseaux (January 3, 1947 – September 30, 2013), usually credited as Zulema, was an American disco and R&B singer and songwriter. Aside from her solo career, she was a member of an early line up of Faith, Hope and Charity and worked as a backing vocalist and songwriter with Aretha Franklin.

== Background ==
Zulema Cusseaux was born in Tampa, Florida, and attended Howard W. Blake High School.

== Career ==
Zulema and her school friend Brenda Hilliard joined a local group called The 5 Crystals, before the two formed the trio the Lovelles, together with fellow Tampa native Albert Bailey. When they met producer Van McCoy and were signed by Maxwell Records, the group's name was changed to Faith, Hope and Charity. Their song "So Much Love" hit #15 on the R&B chart and #60 on the pop chart in 1970.

Zulema left Faith, Hope and Charity in 1971 shortly after a label switch to Sussex Records. Bailey and Hilliard would occasionally sing backing vocals on Zulema's albums, though. Her self-titled solo album included the song "American Fruit, African Roots" and a cover of "If This World Were Mine." Zulema started touring as opening act for major stars like Bill Withers. She appeared on a bill with Roberta Flack, Marvin Gaye, Gladys Knight & the Pips, Earth, Wind and Fire and Sly Stone at the Push Expo in Chicago, a concert which became a motion picture called Save the Children. The movie's soundtrack was released on Motown Records and included Zulema's single mother anthem, "This Child of Mine".

After a second Sussex album, Ms Z (produced by Bobby Taylor), the singer signed to RCA records, where she released three albums: Zulema, R.S.V.P. and Suddenly There Was You. She was also one of the featured artists on the soundtrack to the Michael Schultz movie Honeybaby, Honeybaby, providing the track "I Just Can't Say Good-Bye." Her only charting record during that time was a cover of the early Michael Jackson Motown hit "Wanna Be Where You Are", which reached #58 R&B. The single "Suddenly There Was You" was reviewed in the October 23, 1976 issue of Cash Box. It was from the album of the same name. The reviewer predicted it as a Top 40 chart record saying, "R&B DJs should tear this one right from the jacket and slap it on the turntable". In 1978, she released the album Z-Licious on Le Joint Records, which featured a duet with long-term collaborator Van McCoy. McCoy also got Zulema on board for Aretha Franklin's 1979 disco album La Diva - having her write one of the songs and perform backing vocals on the entire album, joined once again by her former band members Hilliard and Bailey.

In 1980, Zulema had a starring role in the New York musical, Jazzbo Brown. In 1982, she formed a duo called Zalmac with Al Macdowell. Their album Whatcha Gonna Do on TSOB included the songs "Friends", "I Get Down" and "What's In It For Me". Zulema had recorded at least one single on the same label, "A Mother Cries", the year before.

== Death ==
After returning to live in Tampa, she became lead musician at the First Baptist Church of West Tampa. She died after a short illness on September 30, 2013, at the age of 66.

== Discography ==
=== Albums ===
- Zulema (Sussex, 1972)
- Ms. Z. (Sussex, 1973)
- Zulema (RCA, 1975)
- RSVP (RCA, 1975)
- Suddenly There Was You (RCA, 1976)
- Z-Licious (Le Joint, 1978)
- Whatcha Gonna Do (The Sound of Brooklyn, 1982) (with Zalmac)

=== Charted singles ===
Year	Single	Chart Positions
Year	Single	US R&B
1973	"Telling the World Good-Bye (Try to Find Yourself)"	91
1975	"Wanna Be Where You Are"	58
1978	"Change"	46
1979	"I'm Not Dreaming"	76
