= Chris Bartley (singer) =

American musician

Leroy "Chris" Bartley (April 17, 1947 – October 26, 2009) was an American R&B singer. Bartley grew up listening to 1950s soul and doo wop, and formed his own group in the early 1960s with William Graham, Henry Powell, Sam Nesbitt, and Ronald Marshall. The group was initially called The Soulful Inspirations, but changed names several times, including a stint as The Mindbenders.

Later in the 1960s, Bartley and Marshall auditioned as a duo with Van McCoy, and McCoy elected to sign Bartley to a solo deal with Cameo-Parkway subsidiary Vando Records. Bartley hit the pop charts with the McCoy-penned single "The Sweetest Thing This Side of Heaven", peaking at #10 on the US R&B Singles chart and #32 on the Billboard pop charts in 1967. On Cash Box, it reached number 35. Also, the song reached number 14 on the Canadian R&B chart. Bartley released a full album behind the single and toured both in America and England following the song's success. When Vando Records folded, Bartley signed with Buddah Records, but the resulting single "Baby I'm Yours" did not chart. Bartley left the music industry in the early 1970s as a result of family health problems, but re-emerged a few years later by joining The Ad-Libs.

Chris Bartley died of kidney failure on October 26, 2009 at age 62.

== Discography ==
=== Albums ===
- The Sweetest Thing This Side of Heaven — Vando VA-60000 (Mono) / VAS-60000 (Stereo) — 1967

=== Singles ===
- "The Sweetest Thing This Side of Heaven" / "Love My Baby" — Vando 101 — 7/67
- "Baby It's Wonderful" / "I'll Be Loving You" — Vando 3000 — 10/67
- "For You" / "You Get Next to My Heart" — Vando 3001 — 12/67
- "Truer Words Were Never Spoken" / "This Feeling You Give Me" — Vando 14000 — 1968
- "I Found a Goodie" / "Be Mine Forever" — Vando 14001 — 1968
- "Baby I'm Yours" / "I'll Take the Blame" — Buddah 93 — 1969
- "One Wonderful Girl" / "I Know We Can Work It Out" — Buddah 115 — 1969
- "A Man, A Woman" / "Tomorrow Keeps Shining on Me" — Musicor 1437 — 5/71
