= Brenda & the Tabulations =

1960s American R&B group from Philadelphia

- Origin: Philadelphia
- Genres: Soul, r&b
- Years active: 1966 - ?
- Labels: Dionn Records, Top and Bottom Records, Memory Pain, Epic, Chocolate City
- Past members: Brenda Payton; Eddie Jackson; Jerry Jones; Maurice Coates

Brenda & the Tabulations were an American R&B group, formed in 1966 in Philadelphia originally composed of Brenda Payton, Eddie L. Jackson, Maurice Coates, and Jerry Jones.

== History ==
The group had a distinctive, almost doo-wop sound, especially at the start featuring Payton's sweet occasionally rough-edged vocals with background male harmonies. The line-up changed around 1971 with the original three men departing. Two female backing singers (Pat Mercer and Deborah Martin) were brought into the group.

Brenda and the Tabulations had two major US hits: "Dry Your Eyes", which hit number 20 in 1967, and "Right on the Tip of My Tongue", which hit number 23 in 1971. The latter was produced by Van McCoy. Several other songs became hits or moderate hits on the US soul singles chart from the late 1960s to the late 1970s.

The group released three albums: Dry Your Eyes on Dionn Records (1967), Brenda and the Tabulations on Top & Bottom Records (1970), and I Keep Coming Back For More on Chocolate City/Casablanca (1977), although by the time of the last album, Brenda Payton was relatively a solo act while keeping the group name. The group signed with Epic Records in 1972 and released four singles. One of the Epic singles, "One Girl Too Late", charted on the soul chart.

Brenda and the Tabulations are one of many recording artists referenced in the song "Life Is a Rock (But the Radio Rolled Me)" by the studio group Reunion. Payton, born on October 24, 1945, died on June 14, 1992, aged 46. Eddie L. Jackson died on May 3, 2010, from a brain aneurysm at the age of 63.

The group's music had a revival in 2011, when the song "The Wash" from the album Dry Your Eyes was licensed by Unilever for use in an Axe body wash commercial. Their version of "Who's Lovin' You" was one of the Desert Island Discs chosen by Keith Richards for Pulse! magazine (now defunct) and reprinted for a 1999 satirical piece in The New Yorker.

== Discography ==
=== Studio albums ===
Year	Album	Chart positions		Record label
Year	Album	US	US R&B	Record label
1967	Dry Your Eyes	191	19	Dionn
1971	Brenda & the Tabulations	—	—	Top & Bottom
1977	I Keep Coming Back for More	—	—	Chocolate City
"—" denotes the album failed to chart

=== Compilation albums ===
Year	Album	Chart positions		Record label
Year	Album	US	US R&B	Record label
2000	Right on the Tip of My Tongue	—	—	Jamie/Guyden
2008	The Dionn Singles Collection 1966-1969	—	—	Jamie/Guyden
2008	The Top and Bottom Singles Collection 1969-1971	—	—	Jamie/Guyden
"—" denotes the album failed to chart

=== Singles ===
Year	Single (A-side, B-side) Both sides from same album except where indicated	Chart positions		Album
Year	Single (A-side, B-side) Both sides from same album except where indicated	US	US R&B	Album
1967	"Dry Your Eyes" b/w "The Wash"	20	8	Dry Your Eyes
1967	"Stay Together Young Lovers" /	66	44	Dry Your Eyes
1967	"Who's Lovin' You"	66	19	Dry Your Eyes
1967	"Just Once in a Lifetime" b/w "Hey Boy"	97	41	Dry Your Eyes
1967	"When You're Gone" b/w "Hey Boy" (from Dry Your Eyes)	58	27	Non-album tracks
1968	"Baby You're So Right For Me" /	86	—	Non-album tracks
1968	"To The One I Love"	—	45	Non-album tracks
1968	"That's In The Past" b/w "I Can't Get Over You"	—	—	Non-album tracks
1969	"(You Gave Me) A Reason To Live" b/w "Hey Boy" (from Dry Your Eyes)	—	—	Non-album tracks
1969	"That's The Price You Have To Pay" b/w "I Wish I Hadn't Done What I Did"	—	43	Non-album tracks
1969	"The Touch Of You" b/w "Stop Sneaking Around" (Non-album track)	50	12	Brenda and The Tabulations
1970	"And My Heart Sang (Tra La La)" b/w "Lies Lies Lies"	64	12	Brenda and The Tabulations
1970	"Don't Make Me Over" b/w "You've Changed"	77	15	Brenda and The Tabulations
1971	"A Child No One Wanted" b/w "Scuze Uz Y'all"	120	42	Brenda and The Tabulations
1971	"Right on the Tip of My Tongue" b/w "Always and Forever" (Non-album track)	23	10	Brenda and The Tabulations
1971	"A Part Of You" b/w "Where There's A Will (There's A Way)"	94	14	Non-album tracks
1971	"Why Didn't I Think Of That" b/w "A Love You Can Depend On"	107	34	Non-album tracks
1972	"Little Bit Of Love" b/w "Let Me Be Happy"	—	—	Non-album tracks
1973	"One Girl Too Late" b/w "Magic Of Your Love"	—	48	Non-album tracks
1973	"Key To My Heart" b/w "Love Is Just A Carnival"	—	—	Non-album tracks
1973	"Walk On In" b/w "I'm In Love"	—	—	Non-album tracks
1976	"Home To Myself" b/w "Leave Me Alone"	—	61	I Keep Coming Back For More
1977	"(I'm A) Superstar" b/w "Take It Or Leave It"	—	31	I Keep Coming Back For More
1977	"I Keep Coming Back For More" b/w "Let's Go All The Way (Down)"	—	—	I Keep Coming Back For More
1987	"Don't Give Up The Love" b/w "In The Night"	—	—	Non-album tracks
"—" denotes the single failed to chart
