= H & L Records =

H&L Records (1976–1979) was a record label founded by Hugo Peretti and Luigi Creatore after they left Avco Records. They took The Stylistics with them.

== History ==
=== Releases ===
The dual artist record, "That Old Black Magic" by The Softones backed with "Love is the Answer" by Van McCoy was released on a single. By October 1978, the backing band for The Manhattans, 98.6 were signed to the H & L label.

=== Later years ===
In 1984, the H&L masters and those from Avco were acquired by Amherst Records.

== See also ==
- List of record labels
