= Gerry Shury =

British songwriter, arranger, and record producer (1944–1978)

Gerald Roland Shury (11 August 1944 – 24 May 1978) was a British songwriter, arranger, and record producer who worked in the late 1960s and 1970s.

Shury was born in Berkhamsted, Hertfordshire, England, though some sources state Brixton, London. He started his career in the late 1960s initially as an arranger and went on to work with Barry Blue, Lynsey de Paul, Ron Roker, The Bee Gees, Biddu and The Rubettes, before becoming involved in the British soul, funk and disco scene of the 1970s. After flirting with glam rock by co-writing the UK top 10 single "Do You Wanna Dance" with Barry Blue and Ron Roker, he moved to writing in a more soul/funk/disco vein with songs such as "Guilty", a UK number 10 hit for The Pearls in 1974, as well as "Dance Little Lady Dance", which was a hit for Tina Charles, reaching number 6 on the UK Singles Chart. Another song Shury co-penned is "Up in a Puff of Smoke" originally recorded by Polly Brown and covered by the Rubinoos. It reached number 16 on the Billboard Hot 100 and number 43 on the UK Singles Chart in 1974. He also co-wrote "Devil's Gun", an American hit for C. J. & Company, which was the first record played when Studio 54 opened on April 26, 1977. Together with Chris Rae and Ron Roker, he also wrote "Do You Believe in Love at First Sight" for Dionne Warwick.

Shury provided music for the 1972 film Hunted.

Shury died in a car crash in 1978 aged 33. According to Ron Roker, he was returning to London late at night after visiting a club in Brighton when he fell asleep at the wheel of his car, which crashed, killing him instantly.
