= Faith Hope and Charity (US band) =

1970s disco act

Faith Hope & Charity
- Origin: Tampa, Florida, United States
- Genres: Soul
- Years active: 1969–1979
- Labels: Maxwell, Sussex, RCA, 20th Century Fox
- Past members: 1970-1971; Zulema Cusseaux; Albert Bailey; Brenda Hilliard; 1971-1974; Albert Bailey; Brenda Hilliard; 1974-1979; Albert Bailey; Brenda Hilliard; Dianne Destry

Faith Hope and Charity was the name of a vocal group from Tampa, Florida. They are best known for their 1975 hit, "To Each His Own". They were also an in-demand group of session singers in New York studios during the 1970s.

== Career ==
The founding members of the group were Zulema Cusseaux, Brenda Hilliard and Al Bailey. They were originally a trio called the Lovelles, when they met record producer Van McCoy, who signed them to a recording contract at Maxwell Records. At this time, the group's name was changed to Faith, Hope and Charity.

Their song "So Much Love" hit #14 on the Billboard R&B chart and #51 on the Hot 100 in 1970. The subsequent release "Baby Don't Take Your Love" reached #36 R&B and #96 in the Hot 100.

Cusseaux left Faith, Hope and Charity in 1971, shortly after a label switch to Sussex Records, and started a solo career. She was eventually replaced by Diane Destry in 1974. Their biggest hit came with a switch to RCA Records in the mid-1970s. With Van McCoy still writing and producing for the group, they hit the top of the R&B charts with "To Each His Own" (1975; #1 R&B, #15 Dance, #50 Hot 100).The group also sang vocals on Van McCoy's instrumental album "Disco Baby" which included the worldwide #1 hit "The Hustle" in 1975 (Avco Records).

They then scored another hit in January 1976, reaching #38 in the UK Singles Chart with "Just One Look" (from their album, Faith, Hope & Charity). It was a cover version of a Doris Troy track. Their single "Don't Pity Me" reached #20 on the R&B chart in 1978. After a second album with RCA, which produced a couple of minor hits, Destry left, but Hilliard and Bailey carried on for another album in 1978, with 20th Century, before splitting up.

It seemed that there was another member of Faith Hope & Charity in 1977. Priscilla Baskerville has been credited as being a member of the group on some recordings.

== Post FH&C ==
Brenda Hilliard and Albert Bailey released a single "Talking About Loving You" b/w "This Has Happened Before" that was released on Clarama Records CL-1200, credited to Brenda & Albert.

Zulema Cusseaux died on September 30, 2013, at age 66.

Bailey died on May 27, 2020.

== Discography ==
=== Studio albums ===
Year	Title	Peak chart positions		Record label
Year	Title	US	US R&B	Record label
1970	Faith Hope & Charity	—	—	Maxwell
1972	Heavy Love	—	—	Sussex
1975	Faith Hope & Charity	100	24	RCA Victor
1976	Life Goes On	—	—	RCA Victor
1978	Faith Hope & Charity	—	—	20th Century Fox
"—" denotes releases that did not chart.

=== Singles ===
Year	Title	Peak chart positions						Album
Year	Title	US	US R&B	US Dan	CAN	NZ	UK	Album
1970	"So Much Love"	51	14	—	38	—	—	Faith, Hope & Charity (1970)
1970	"Baby Don't Take Your Love"	96	36	—	—	—	—	Faith, Hope & Charity (1970)
1971	"Come Back and Finish What You Started"	—	—	—	—	—	—	Heavy Love
1971	"No Trespassing"	—	—	—	—	—	—	Heavy Love
1972	"God Bless the World"	—	—	—	—	—	—	Heavy Love
1972	"I Was There"	—	—	—	—	—	—	Heavy Love
1973	"Who Made You Go"	—	—	—	—	—	—	Heavy Love
1975	"To Each His Own"	50	1	15	58	28	—	Faith, Hope & Charity (1975)
1975	"Mellow Me"	—	—	18	—	—	—	Faith, Hope & Charity (1975)
1975	"Just One Look"	—	—	—	—	—	38	Faith, Hope & Charity (1975)
1976	"Don't Go Looking for Love"	—	38	—	—	—	—	Faith, Hope & Charity (1975)
1976	"A Time for Celebration" (with The Choice Four)	107	—	—	—	—	—	Life Goes On
1976	"You're My Peace of Mind"	—	83	13	—	—	—	Life Goes On
1977	"Life Goes On"	—	65	13	—	—	—	Life Goes On
1978	"Don't Pity Me"	—	20	—	—	—	—	Faith Hope & Charity (1978)
1978	"How Can I Help But Love You"	—	—	—	—	—	—	Faith Hope & Charity (1978)
"—" denotes a recording that did not chart or was not released in that territory.

== Note ==
There was a girl band of the 1990s called Faith Hope & Charity that had no connection to this group.
