= Van McCoy =

American musician, producer and songwriter (1940–1979)

- McCoy in 1976

Background information
- Born: Van Allen Clinton McCoy; January 6, 1940; Washington, D.C., U.S.
- Died: July 6, 1979 (aged 39) Englewood, New Jersey, U.S.
- Genres: Disco, R&B, pop
- Occupations: Record producer, arranger, songwriter, singer
- Years active: 1952–1979
- Labels: Columbia, Avco, H&L
- Formerly of: the Starlighters, Van McCoy & the Soul City Symphony
- Website: http://www.vanmccoymusic.com/van/

Van Allen Clinton McCoy (January 6, 1940 – July 6, 1979) was an American record producer, arranger, songwriter and singer. He is known for his 1975 internationally successful hit "The Hustle". He has approximately 700 song copyrights to his credit, and produced songs by such recording artists as Brenda & the Tabulations; David Ruffin; The Stylistics; The Presidents; Faith, Hope & Charity; The Choice Four; Gladys Knight & the Pips; Aretha Franklin; Peaches & Herb; Lesley Gore; and Stacy Lattisaw.

== Childhood, family and education ==
Van McCoy was born on January 6, 1940, in Washington, D.C., the second child of Norman S. McCoy, Sr. and Lillian Ray. He learned to play piano at a young age and sang with the Metropolitan Baptist Church choir as a youngster.

In September 1958, McCoy entered Howard University and studied psychology, but he left school two years later in order to resume his musical career.

== Career ==
=== During his youth ===
By the age of 12, he had begun writing his own songs, in addition to performing in local amateur shows alongside his older brother, Norman Jr. The two brothers formed a doo-wop combo named the Starlighters with two friends while in Theodore Roosevelt High School. In 1956, they recorded a single, "The Birdland", a novelty dance record. It gained some interest, resulting in a tour with saxophonist Vi Burnside. In 1959, the Starlighters produced three singles for End Records that included "I Cried". Marriage and other commitments eventually caused the group to disband during the mid-1950s. Van also sang with a group called the Marylanders.

=== As an adult ===
McCoy relocated to Philadelphia after leaving Howard University. He formed his own recording company, Rockin' Records, releasing his first single, "Hey Mr. D.J.", in 1959. This single gained the attention of Scepter Records owner Florence Greenberg, who hired McCoy as a staff writer and A&R representative for the label. As a writer there, McCoy composed his first success, "Stop the Music", for the popular female vocal group The Shirelles in 1962, who he also arranged for. He was co-owner of Vando Records with Philly D.J. Jocko Henderson. He owned the Share record label and co-owned the Maxx record label in the mid-1960s, supervising such artists as Gladys Knight & the Pips, Chris Bartley and The Ad Libs.

McCoy came into his own after first working for top producers Jerry Leiber and Mike Stoller as a writer, and then signing with the major April-Blackwood music publishing concern, connected with Columbia Records. He began writing a string of hits as the 1960s progressed. He penned "Giving Up" for Gladys Knight & the Pips (later a hit for both The Ad Libs and Donny Hathaway), "The Sweetest Thing This Side of Heaven" for Chris Bartley, "When You're Young and in Love" for Ruby & the Romantics (later a hit for The Marvelettes), "Right on the Tip of My Tongue" for Brenda & the Tabulations, "Baby I'm Yours" for Barbara Lewis, "Getting Mighty Crowded" for Betty Everett, "Abracadabra" for Erma Franklin, "You're Gonna Make Me Love You" for Sandi Sheldon, and "I Get the Sweetest Feeling" for Jackie Wilson.

Joe Cobb was a songwriting partner of Van McCoy. The duo composed at least eighteen chart hits, including "So Much Love" by Faith, Hope & Charity, "Triangle Of Love (Hey Diddle Diddle)" by The Presidents [on whom McCoy produced "5,10,15.20 (25,30 Years of Love)"], "Right on the Tip of My Tongue" by Brenda & the Tabulations, and "Come Back and Finish What You Started" by Gladys Knight & the Pips.

== Composition and production ==
=== Late 1950s to late 1960s ===
Cash Box reported in the June 13, 1964, issue that McCoy was appointed to the position of staff writer for the music publishing company April-Blackwood Music. He was working under Jerry Teifer. His duties included writing music and lyrics for all their labels, major and independent labels. He also had the responsibility to maintain the liaison with artists and producers. At that time, McCoy's composition "Giving Up" by Gladys Knight & the Pips was doing well in the charts. It was at no. 56 in the Cash Box Top 100 and no. 10 in the Cash Box Top 50 in R&B Locations chart.

In 1965, Barbara Lewis had the Van McCoy-composed "Baby I'm Yours" released. She was originally reluctant to record it. It went to no. 11 that year.

Daedalus Productions – VMP Productions

By July 1965, McCoy and David Kapralik had formed Daedalus Productions. Their first production was to be a release by The Spellbinders. At the time, McCoy's composition "Before and After" by Chad and Jeremy and "Baby I'm Yours" by Barbara Lewis were both in the Cash Box Top 100.

Around 1965, McCoy was promoting the Sweet Things, a female vocal outfit. Walking into a Washington, D.C., record store one day, he was roped into giving a young salesman there an audition in the storeroom. Soon he had an idea that he could put the salesman, Herb Fame, together with the Sweet Things lead singer Francine Barker, and they would be a duo. And that was the beginning of Peaches & Herb. He ended up arranging and co-producing their first hit, "Let's Fall in Love", for the Columbia subsidiary Date in 1966.

In 1966, he started his own short-lived label, Vando.

By March 11, 1967, McCoy had left Daedalus Productions and had started his own production company, VMP (Van McCoy Productions). The new company formed new labels and distributed the product via independents. It also produced artists for various labels. Already by then a Daedalus production that McCoy had arranged, produced and conducted, "Let's Fall in Love" by Peaches & Herb was in the charts. Also the previous week, a Sandi Sheldon record ("You're Gonna Make Me Love You") had been released by Okeh Records. It was done under the banner of Soul Sound Productions.

=== 1970s ===
One outfit Van wrote or produced most consistently for was The Presidents, who had the hit "5-10-15-20 (25-30 Years of Love)".

In the early 1970s, McCoy had begun a long, acclaimed collaboration with songwriter/producer Charles Kipps, and arranged several hits for the soul group The Stylistics etc.

McCoy also had success with David Ruffin's comeback album, Who I Am (1975), featuring "Walk Away from Love", (US No. 9, US No. 1 R&B) in the US and a UK top 10 success. He went on to produce the next two albums for Ruffin, which spawned further successes. His early discovery, Faith, Hope And Charity, had major success in 1975 with "To Each His Own". It was another R&B chart-topper. Also in 1975, he arranged two of his compositions, "My Heart's Too Big for My Head" and "You've Got to Tell Her", for the Asha Puthli album She Loves to Hear the Music.

An example of multiple McCoy compositions in the same chart was for the week ending November 15, 1975, in the Billboard Hot Soul Singles Chart. In addition to his hit "Change with the Times", which at week 6 was at no. 8, there was "To each His Own" by Faith Hope & Charity at no. 10 at week 14, "When You're Young and in Love" by Choice Four at no. 71 at week 11 and "I Destroyed "Your Love" by Special Delivery at no. 71 at week 5.

For the week ending May 8, 1976, McCoy had four of his compositions in the Billboard Hot Soul Singles Chart. At week ten, "Heavy Love" by David Ruffin was at no. 17, and "This is It" by Melba Moore at week six was at no. 29. His own single, "Night Walk" was on its fourth week at no 52, and "Hey What's that Dance You're Doing" by The Choice Four on week five was at no. 60.

Also in 1976, McCoy produced Melba Moore's "This Is It" and "Lean on Me".

Having changed the name of their production company Whitehouse Productions to McCoy-Kipps Productions in early 1976, McCoy and Charles Kipps had entered a new venture towards the end of that year. They had entered a production agreement to produce two albums of new R&B acts. A McCoy-Kipps Productions bio sheet for Kipps indicated that one of the artists could be actress Tamara Dobson. Dobson had signed with MCA sometime in the later part of 1976. Confirmation of things in motion appeared in the November 27 issue of Billboard. Dobson was the first artist to have a release scheduled for early 1977. Prior to that, in 1975 and 1976 McCoy had been seen escorting Dobson as well as dancing with her various venues.

During 1977, he produced Gladys Knight & the Pips' Still Together LP.

== Recording career ==
=== 1950s ===
McCoy along with brother Norman and two schoolmates, Freddy Smith and Paul Comedy formed The Starlighters. He was still at Dunbar High School at the time. It was then after he had transferred to Roosevelt High School in D.C. that "The Birdland" was recorded in 1956. The group later recorded "I Cried" which was released on the End Records label in 1959.

=== 1960s ===
First solo hit, Mr. DJ

On July 8, his single "Mr. D. J." entered the Cash Box Looking Ahead chart at no. 42, then peaking at no. 5 on August 19. It would also get to No. 101 on the Billboard chart.

Further activities

Making note of McCoy's success with "Mr. D. J.", Cash Box reviewed his single "Girls are Sentimental" / "Baby Don't Tease Me" (Rockin’ 1012). In the Pick of The Week section, the reviewer gave the A-side love ballad beat song and the B-side cha-cha beat romance song national potential.

Having met Kendra Spotswood (also known as Sandi Sheldon), who lived near his family in 1961, she became his romantic interest, and they became an item. For the next five years, they would sing and record music together professionally. Their relationship ended when McCoy delayed their wedding plans because of a work contract he had signed with Columbia Records.

Solo career on Columbia

By 1965, Columbia Records had recently acquired Van McCoy. McCoy's history as a songwriter was known in the industry. Managed at the time by David Kapralik, it was Kapralik who made McCoy known to Columbia vice-president, William P. Gallagher. Columbia wanted to push him as a recording artist. An article in the October 2 issue of Billboard wrote that the label was using its muscle in a promotion strategy to pitch him via a coast-to-coast tour of radio stations, extensive trade advertising, and promotional mailing to disk jockeys etc. Amongst this, there was to be a cover story about McCoy on the record company's nationally distributed company magazine, Insight.

The first single for the label consisted of two McCoy originals, "Butterfly" and "Keep Loving Me". The single at the time had "Keep Loving Me" as the A-side. Backed with "Butterfly", it was arranged by Gary Sherman, and was released on Columbia 43415. The October 2 issue of Billboard had it in the Pop Spotlights Top 60 section, a record predicted to reach the top 60 of the HOT 100 Chart. The following week, Billboard ran a picture of McCoy seated, signing his contract with Columbia vice-president William P. Gallgaher and manager Dave Kapralik looking on. A full page advert for the single with McCoy pictured appeared on page 5 of the same issue.

It charted in Canada, making its debut in the R. P. M. Play Sheet chart at no. 36 on the week of October 25. In her New York column, Harriet Wasser (R. P. M.'s New York correspondent) mentioned that McCoy singing on "Butterfly" sounded a bit like Nat King Cole and Johnny Mathis. With the magazine now calling itself, R. P. M. Music Weekly the single peaked at no. 10 on the week of December 6.

In 1966, McCoy recorded a solo LP for Columbia entitled Night Time Is Lonely Time. It was produced by Mitch Miller.

=== 1970s ===
In 1972, he released his own solo LP on the Buddah label, Soul Improvisations. The album included a minor hit, "Let Me Down Easy", but it was not a success following poor promotion. A few years later, following his success with The Hustle, it would be re-released in abridged form (two songs less) as From Disco to Love. He would form his own orchestra, Soul City Symphony and, with singers Faith, Hope and Charity, produce several albums and give many performances.

Mainstream success

In 1975, McCoy released to low expectations the mostly instrumental LP Disco Baby for the Avco (later H&L) label. The title song, "Disco Baby", was written by George David Weiss, Hugo Peretti and Luigi Creatore, and was also performed by The Stylistics for their 1975 album Thank You Baby. Unexpectedly, a single called "The Hustle" from the album, written about the dance of the same name and recorded last for the album, went to the top of both the Billboard pop and R&B charts (also No. 3 in the UK) and won a Grammy Award. The album was also nominated for a Grammy. McCoy, then regarded as a disco hitmaker, never repeated the success of the song, although later singles "Party", "That's the Joint" and "Change with the Times" would get significant airplay. The latter would reach No. 6 in the Billboard R&B chart and be a top 40 hit in the UK.

For the week of April 26, 1975, while "The Hustle" was at no. 7 on the Record World Disco File Top 20. He also had four of his songs on the Discotheque Hit Parade. "The Hustle" was getting spun at the Flamingo in New York as well as The Zanzibar at Washington, D.C., and The Directoire in New York. "Fire" was getting played at Disco 1985 in Los Angeles, "Disco Baby" was being played at The Zanzibar as well as "Turn this Mother Out".

On June 19, 1975, McCoy was in Montreal, Canada, attending a reception hosted by Quality Records at the Limelight night club. There he was presented with a giant award with the inscription, "Presented to Van McCoy by Quality Records Limited, in recognition of "Love Is the Answer" for the song's achieving hit status in Quebec. The function was to also commemorate the first concert appearance of Van McCoy and the Soul City Symphony at the Montreal Forum the next day on the 20th.

Making its debut on the Cash Box Top 100 R&B chart for the week of September 27, 1975, "Change with the Times" was at no. 78. Also that week, another composition of his, "To Each His Own" by Faith Hope and Charity was at no. 12 in the same chart. "Change with the Times" peaked at no. 8 on the Top 100 R&B Singles chart on the week of November 22. It had also on made its debut on the week of October 4 in the Cash Box Top 100 Singles chart at no. 89, just behind by Silver Convention's "Fly, Robin, Fly" which was also making its debut. On the week of November 8, the single got to no. 52 on the Cash Box Top 100 chart, and held that position for another week.

Van McCoy Day

Tuesday, April 27, 1976, was a recognition day for Van McCoy. He was honored by members of the Washington broadcasting and political community. It was in recognition for his impact in disco. Involved in the celebration and sponsoring it were Douglas Stereo, Sam K's Record Shop, Gerrie's International House of Music and Universal Discount Records. They were joined Ray Mott, owner of the Sagittarius restaurant. The disco party was held there. The day also involved 60 second radio spots on most stations. The spots had been purchased by H & L Records. Events included McCoy visiting each of the record stores. He did interviews with radio stations WKYS, WOL and WHUR with the latter honoring his in their programs all day. He also did interviews for television stations which included TTG -TV.

Further activities

On New Years Eve, December 31, 1976, McCoy performed with band Stuff and brought in the new year at The Bottom Line, singing "When I Fall in Love". The show was recorded from the band's sound board. That song and another by McCoy, "You Still Be the One", appeared on an unofficially released Stuff album, Countdown To 1977, which also featured some tracks by Ashford & Simpson.

Sum up of (1970 to 1977) period

After his mega success with "The Hustle" there were no further major sellers in the US, despite a series of follow-up albums, From Disco to Love (the abridged 1975 reissue of Soul Improvisations), The Disco Kid (1975), The Real McCoy (1976), and Rhythms of the World (1976). However, he scored the UK top 5 again during 1977 with the instrumental success "The Shuffle". which became the theme tune for BBC Radio 4's Sport on Four.

"My Favorite Fantasy"

On March 25, 1978, his new album, My Favorite Fantasy, was reviewed. It was made up of original McCoy compositions and was co-produced with Charles Kipps. The clarity, smoothness and easiness of his vocals as well as the strength and instrumental rhythm was noted. The picks by Billboard were "That's the Story of My Life", "Two Points", "You're So Right for Me", "Before and After", and "Wings of Love". "My Favorite Fantasy" wasn't a pick then. However, two weeks later on April 8, Billboard had "My Favorite Fantasy" as a recommended soul single in the Top Single Picks section. With Susan Kluth's review of the album in Record Mirror, she took note of McCoy's faultless vocals, the aspects of human life, and heart - wrenching lyrics etc. However, she didn't display any enthusiasm.

"My Favorite Fantasy" would become a hit. While it was charting, another composition of his, "Don't Pity Me" by Faith Hope & Charity, was seeing chart action in the same Billboard and Cash Box charts. In the United States, "My Favorite Fantasy" peaked at No. 76 on the Billboard Hot Soul Singles chart, peaked at No. 51 on the Cash Box Top 100 R&B chart, and it peaked at No. 48 on the Record World R&B singles chart. In Canada, it peaked at No. 37 on the RPM Adult Oriented Playlist chart. It also charted in the United Kingdom, getting on to the Record Mirror UK Disco Top 90 chart, peaking at No. 70.

Further activities

By July 1978, Faith Hope & Charity had recorded McCoy's composition "Don't Pity Me" and released it as a single. It was actually recorded earlier by 1976 Eurovision British contestant Louisa Jane White, and released as a B-side of her 1977 single "Don't Stop". The Faith Hope & Charity, produced by him, was released on 20th Century TC-2370. The song made its debut in the Cash Box Top 100 R&B chart on week ending May 27, 1978. On August 12 at week twelve, it peaked at No. 12. It peaked at No. 20 on the Billboard Hot Soul Singles Chart on week ending August 5.

In late 1978, he produced and composed the A-side of the single "I'm Not Dreaming", credited to Zulema (and friend). It was backed with "Gotta Find a Way", released on LeJoint 5N-34002.

It was reported in the December 30, 1978 issue of Cash Box that MCA was holding back on a Van McCoy recording, "Patrolers Theme". Instead of this recording they were coming with "Lonely Dancer" which was from McCoy's forthcoming LP. The project was overseen by Billy Smith and Richie Rivera was taking care of the mix.

In early January, Richie Rivera presented for the first time his mix of Van McCoy's "Lonely Dancer" at a New York City club. On the week of January 20, 1979, Cash Box wrote that a 12" release of "Lonely Dancer" / "Samba" was being released on MCA that week.

The Zulema and friend single "I'm Not Dreaming" was in the Soul section of Billboard's Top Single Picks for the week of January 20, 1979. The review was favorable. It was revealed that the unnamed friend singing with Zulema was actually Van McCoy. The reviewer put it on par with other "silky, romantic" recent hit recordings by Johnny Mathis & Deniece Williams, and Roberta Flack & Donny Hathaway.

By February, the Lonely Dancer album was out. It was reviewed by Cash Box in the February 24 issue. Referring to McCoy's and Charles Kipps' production values as stellar and first-rate background harmonies, the reviewer said that McCoy's baritone vocals were mostly first rate. The picks were "Merry Go Round", "The Samba" and "Lonely Dancer". His release was part of an extensive campaign by MCA for the February releases which included releases by Joe Ely, Lane Caudell, Jeffree and Mel Tillis. The promotion strategy for McCoy's album was to build a strong base at a disco and R&B level. The paraphernalia to be distributed to the press, radio and retailers included a four-color poster and four-color button. Of the "Lonely Dancer" single, Brian Chin of Record World said, it was a "needed and pleasing change of direction for him". He also noted that McCoy sang lead on the song, the phased strings and Richie Rivera's mixing.

Zulema's single, "I'm Not Dreaming" entered the Billboard Hot Soul Singles chart, peaking at No. 76 (week seven) on March 17, 1979, holding the position for another week. It had a total run of nine weeks in the chart.

Also in March, Stuff's album Stuff It was out. Along with Faith Hope & Charity, Vanetta Fields, McCoy provided backing vocals.

In 1979, Van McCoy was still connected with the disco scene. Cash Box ran a recent picture in their March 31 issue. McCoy was pictured with a bunch of people in New York during the National Disco Convention. Pictured were Joanna Beck, Keith Barrow, Tony Beck, Lamarr Rene, WBLS radio personality; McCoy, Nick Mundy member of the Beck Family; and Billy Smith the national disco promotion manager for London.

== Death ==
On June 29, 1979, McCoy suffered a heart attack at his home in Englewood, New Jersey. He was hospitalized and went into a coma, but died at Englewood Hospital a week later at the age of 39. He is buried in the McCoy family plot at Lincoln Memorial Cemetery, Suitland, Maryland, a suburb of Washington, D.C.

== Personal life ==
McCoy was set to marry Kendra Spotswood in the spring of 1966. They had been in a relationship since 1961. McCoy's pursuit of his career ruined their wedding plans.

During 1975 and 1976, McCoy was seen at various venues with actress Tamara Dobson.

McCoy never married or had any children. He doted on his brother's four children and would give them gifts from places he went. He was greatly affected by the sudden death of his mother in 1973 from a brain hemorrhage and the death of his grandmother Mary Lindsay Ray in August 1976. Since the death of his mother, he had tried to distract himself by focusing on his career. After his grandmother died at the age of 101 or 102, both his physical and mental health declined.

== Television and film ==
Van McCoy appeared on The Mike Douglas Show and was a regular guest on The Tonight Show. He wrote and sang the theme song for the 1978 movie Sextette that starred Mae West and Timothy Dalton and made a cameo appearance in it, playing a delegate from Africa. He also contributed some music for A Woman Called Moses. Along with Faith Hope & Charity, Brass Construction and Johnny Dark, he appeared in episode 4.20 of Don Kirshner's Rock Concert.

== Discography ==
=== Studio albums ===
Year	Album	Peak chart positions							Certifications	Record label
Year	Album	US	US R&B	AUS	CAN	GER	NL	UK	Certifications	Record label
1966	Night Time Is Lonely Time	—	—	—	—	—	—	—		Columbia
1972	Soul Improvisations	—	—	—	—	—	—	—		Buddah
1974	Love Is the Answer ^{[A]}	—	—	—	—	—	—	—		Avco
1975	Disco Baby ^{[A]}	12	1	33	11	16	—	32	MC: Gold	Avco
1975	From Disco to Love	181	41	—	75	—	—	—		Buddah
1975	The Disco Kid	82	18	97	—	—	20	—		Avco
1976	The Real McCoy	106	22	—	—	—	—	—		H&L
1976	Rhythms of the World	—	44	—	—	—	—	—		H&L
1977	Van McCoy and His Magnificent Movie Machine	—	—	—	—	—	—	—		H&L
1978	My Favorite Fantasy	—	—	—	—	—	—	—		MCA
1979	Lonely Dancer	—	—	—	—	—	—	—		MCA
"—" denotes a recording that did not chart or was not released in that territory.

- ^{A} Albums credited to Van McCoy & the Soul City Symphony

=== Compilation albums ===
Year	Album	Peak	Record label
Year	Album	US	Record label
1976	The Hustle and Best of Van McCoy	193	H&L
1979	Sweet Rhythm	—	H&L
1987	The Best of Van McCoy	—	H&L
2016	The Best of Van McCoy	—	Unidisc Music
"—" denotes a recording that did not chart or was not released in that territory.

=== Singles ===
Year	Title	Peak chart positions										Certifications	Album
Year	Title	US	US R&B	US A/C	US Dan	AUS	CAN	GER	IRE	NL	UK	Certifications	Album
1961	"I Wantcha Back"	—	—	—	—	—	—	—	—	—	—		—N/a
1961	"Never Trust a Friend"	—	—	—	—	—	—	—	—	—	—		—N/a
1961	"Mr. D.J."	104	—	—	—	—	—	—	—	—	—		—N/a
1961	"Girls Are Sentimental"	—	—	—	—	—	—	—	—	—	—		—N/a
1962	"Follow Your Heart"	—	—	—	—	—	—	—	—	—	—		—N/a
1963	"It Ain't No Big Thing"	—	—	—	—	—	—	—	—	—	—		—N/a
1963	"Very Few Heartaches (Very Few Tears)" (with Kendra Spotswood) ^{[B]}	—	—	—	—	—	—	—	—	—	—		—N/a
1964	"Two of a Kind" (with Kendra Spotswood) ^{[B]}	—	—	—	—	—	—	—	—	—	—		—N/a
1965	"Something Special" (with Kendra Spotswood) ^{[B]}	—	—	—	—	—	—	—	—	—	—		—N/a
1965	"Butterfly"	—	—	—	—	—	10	—	—	—	—		—N/a
1966	"Starlight, Starbright"	—	—	—	—	—	—	—	—	—	—		—N/a
1966	"Take Me for What I Am" (with Kendra Spotswood) ^{[B]}	—	—	—	—	—	—	—	—	—	—		—N/a
1966	"The House That Love Built"	—	—	—	—	—	—	—	—	—	—		Night Time Is Lonely Time
1966	"Pledging My Love"	—	—	—	—	—	—	—	—	—	—		—N/a
1968	"Sweet and Easy" ^{[C]}	—	—	—	—	—	—	—	—	—	—		—N/a
1969	"The Generation Gap" ^{[C]}	—	—	—	—	—	—	—	—	—	—		—N/a
1969	"I Started a Joke"	—	—	—	—	—	—	—	—	—	—		—N/a
1970	"Where There's a Heartache (There Must Be a Heart)"	—	—	—	—	—	—	—	—	—	—		—N/a
1972	"I'm in Love with You Baby"	—	—	—	—	—	—	—	—	—	—		Soul Improvisations
1972	"Let Me Down Easy"	—	—	—	—	—	—	—	—	—	—		Soul Improvisations
1973	"I'm in Your Corner" (with Sharon Ridley)	—	—	—	—	—	—	—	—	—	—		—N/a
1974	"Love Is the Answer" ^{[D]}	—	77	22	—	—	88	—	—	—	—		Love Is the Answer
1974	"African Symphony" ^{[D]}	—	—	—	13	—	—	—	—	—	—		Love Is the Answer
1975	"Boogie Down" ^{[D]}	—	67	—	—	—	—	—	—	—	—		Love Is the Answer
1975	"The Hustle" ^{[D]}	1	1	2	3	9	1	3	5	4	3	RIAA: Gold; BPI: Silver; MC: Gold	Disco Baby
1975	"Change with the Times"	46	6	—	15	—	52	31	—	—	36		The Disco Kid
1976	"Night Walk"	96	51	—	—	—	—	—	—	—	—		The Real McCoy
1976	"Party"	69	20	—	14	—	—	—	—	—	—		The Real McCoy
1976	"Soul Cha Cha" ^{[E]}	—	—	—	14	—	—	13	—	7	34		Rhythms of the World
1976	"The Shuffle"	105	79	—	—	—	—	—	6	—	4	BPI: Silver	Rhythms of the World
1978	"My Favorite Fantasy"	—	76	—	—	—	—	—	—	—	—		My Favorite Fantasy
1978	"Two Points"	—	—	—	—	—	—	—	—	—	—		My Favorite Fantasy
1979	"Lonely Dancer"	—	—	—	—	—	—	—	—	—	—		Lonely Dancer
"—" denotes a recording that did not chart or was not released in that territory.

- ^{B} Singles credited to Jack & Jill
- ^{C} Singles credited to the Van McCoy Strings
- ^{D} Singles credited to Van McCoy & the Soul City Symphony
- ^{E} "Soul Cha Cha" charted with the tracks "Rhythms of the World" and "That's the Joint" on the Disco Action chart
