= Fee-fi-fo-fum (disambiguation) =

- "Fee, fi, fo, fum" is a phrase said by giants in English folklore.
- Fee, Fi, Fo, Fum, and Phooey, five mice who traveled to and circled the Moon on Apollo 17 in 1972, four nicknamed after the poem
- "Devil's Gun", a 1977 disco song by C.J. & Company that repeatedly uses the phrase "Fee Fi! Fo Fum! (You're) lookin' down the barrel of the devil's gun."
- "Somebody's Been Sleeping", a 1969 song by 100 Proof (Aged in Soul) which tells of a man who suspects that another man has been sleeping in his bed. Although the song mimics the story of Goldilocks and the Three Bears, the man repeatedly says "Fe Fi Fo Fum."
- Baba Yaga, in Slavic folklore, also detects human presence by smell
- "Crua Chan", a song by the Argentine rock band Sumo, inspired by the Battle of Culloden, includes the phrase "Fee fi fo fum, I smell the blood of an Englishman" in its chorus
- Fee Fi Fo, a song by the Irish band The Cranberries, from their 1999 album Bury the Hatchet, about child abuse
