= Rob Anderson =

American internet personality

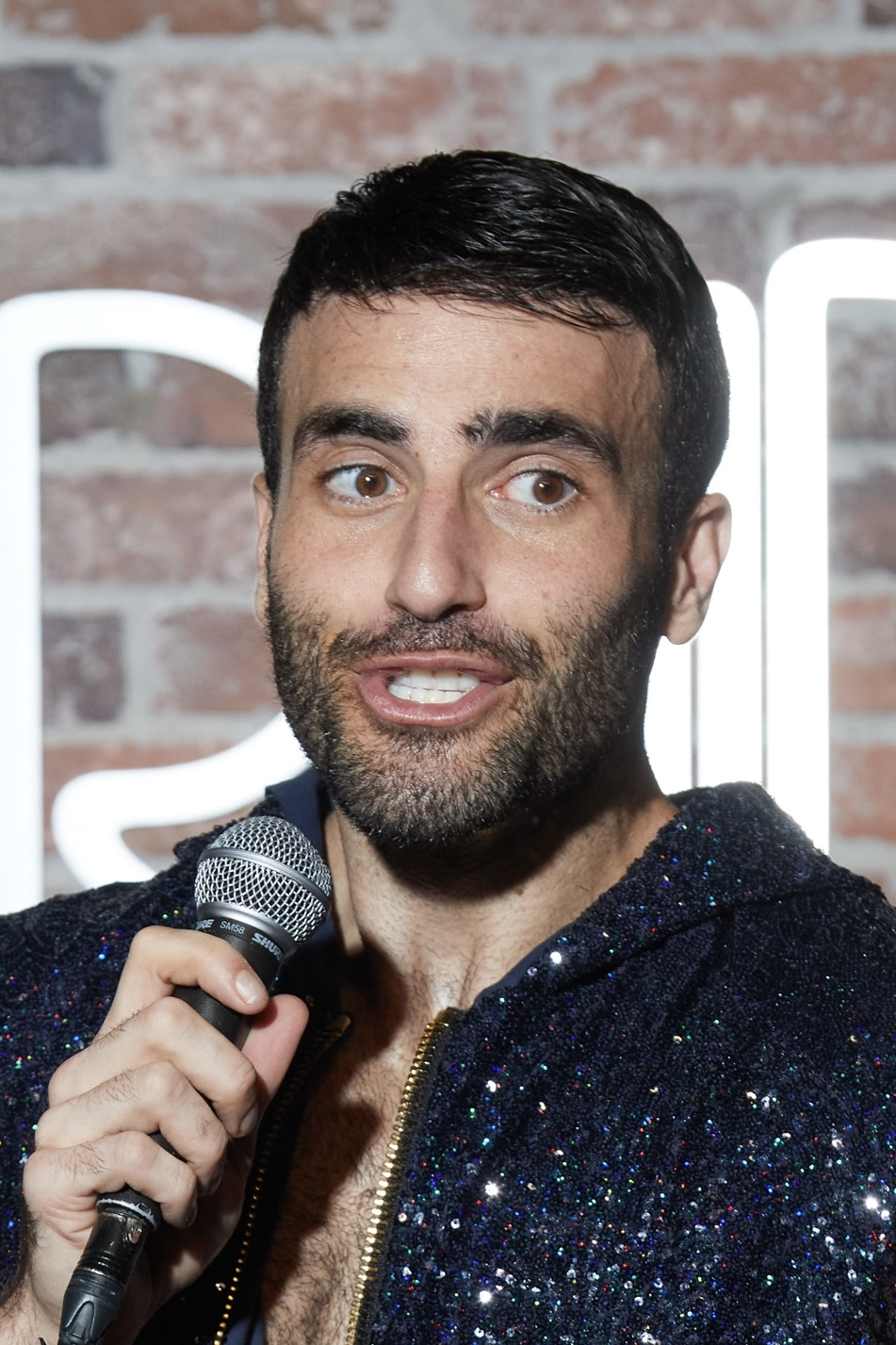
- Anderson in 2022
- Born: 1987 or 1988 (age 38–39)
- Other name: Heartthrobert
- Occupations: Internet personality; comedian
- Years active: 2020–present

Instagram information
- Page: heartthrobanderson
- Years active: 2018–present
- Followers: 1.9 million

TikTok information
- Page: Rob Anderson
- Followers: 2.8 million

YouTube information
- Channel: robanderson
- Years active: 2020–present
- Subscribers: 939 thousand
- Views: 565 million
- Last updated: 23 July 2026
- Website: heartthrob-anderson.com

Robert Anderson is an American internet personality and comedian. Based in New York City, he became known on TikTok for his Gay Science series, which satirizes LGBT stereotypes. He also creates viral videos that recap and deconstruct the plots of 1990s movies and TV shows such as Beethoven, The Princess Diaries, and 7th Heaven.

In 2024, Anderson released the book Gay Science: The Totally Scientific Examination of LGBTQ+ Culture, Myths, and Stereotypes, a humor publication styled as a satirical textbook. The book became a New York Times bestseller, debuting at number five on the hardcover nonfiction list. He is also known for his tongue-in-cheek “Pope Games” coverage of the 2025 Papal conclave in the style of reality TV.

== Early life and career ==
Anderson was raised on the Jersey Shore. Growing up, Anderson attended a Christian school and frequently performed in musicals during his adolescence. After graduating from college, Anderson moved to Chicago, where he was inspired by the first two films in the Scary Movie film series and the television series Strangers with Candy to pursue comedy. There, he performed improv comedy for seven years, including with the iO Theater, Annoyance Theatre, and The Second City. He also competed on the reality competition series Capture in 2013.

Anderson started his personal TikTok account, @Heartthrobert, in late 2019 while living in New York City. He also posted TikTok videos for the food review company The Infatuation, one of which, about granola bars "going everywhere", was posted in 2020 and became popular. His parody of Charlotte Awbery singing the song "Shallow" from the movie musical A Star Is Born went viral and he was soon signed to United Talent Agency. He published the satirical picture book The Fergamerican National Anthem, about Fergie's performance of "The Star-Spangled Banner" at the 2018 NBA All-Star Game.

Anderson began posting comedic recaps of the WB television series 7th Heaven in March 2023, which broadened his audience online. His video about Mama Bear of the children's book series Berenstain Bears being an "almond mom", posted in July 2023, also went viral. He also co-hosted the WOW Presents Plus series Glam Slam with Monét X Change. Anderson's satirical social media series Gay Science, which uses fake science to explain the behaviors behind LGBT stereotypes, began in 2020 with a video of him describing why gay men prefer coffee iced rather than hot. His book Gay Science: The Totally Scientific Examination of LGBTQ+ Culture, Myths, and Stereotypes was published by Penguin Random House in June 2024 and debuted at number five on The New York Times Hardcover Nonfiction bestseller list.

In April 2025, Anderson gained attention for "The Pope Games," a viral social media series that framed the papal conclave as a reality TV competition. In late 2025, he premiered a new stage show, Are You Afraid of the ’90s?, which lampoons 1990s pop culture. Following previews in New York, he began a 28-city national tour for the show.

As of September 2025, Anderson has approximately 0.825 million subscribers on YouTube and 1.5 million followers on Instagram.

== Recognition ==
Rebecca Alter of Vulture praised Anderson's 7th Heaven recaps on TikTok as "painfully funny" and called them "hyper-shortform". Elle Canada's Nancy Pierri wrote in 2021 that Gay Science had "received a ton of praise" on TikTok. Bernardo Sim of Pride called Anderson "one of the most popular gay comedians on social media" in 2022.

In 2022, Anderson was included in Out’s "Out100" list of the most influential LGBTQ+ people.

In 2025, People magazine referred to Anderson as TikTok's unofficial king of nostalgia for his commentary on 1980s and 1990s media.
