= List of best-selling singles in Belgium =

The following is a list of the best-selling singles in Belgium. Depends on the measurement, list is divided by claimed sales and official certifications from Ultratop, which online base operated since 1995.

== List ==
By claimed sales only
Year	Artist	Title	Sales	Origin
1989	Kaoma	"Lambada"	300,000	Claimed sales
1978	Village People	"Y.M.C.A."	300,000	Claimed sales
1974	ABBA	"Waterloo"	200,000	Claimed sales
1977	The Smurfs music	"The Smurfs Song"	200,000	Claimed sales
1978	Boney M.	"Rivers of Babylon"	200,000	Claimed sales
1970	Middle of the Road	"Chirpy Chirpy Cheep Cheep"	178,000	Claimed sales
1978	John Travolta & Olivia Newton-John	"You're the One That I Want"	170,000	Claimed sales
1969	Dimitri Dourakine and his orchestra	"Casatschok"	150,000	Claimed sales
1972	Sweet	"Poppa Joe"	135,000	Claimed sales
1971	Samantha	"Eviva España"	130,000	Claimed sales
1964	Adamo	"Vous Permettez Monsieur"	128,000	Claimed sales
1963	The Beatles	"I Want to Hold Your Hand"	126,000	Claimed sales
1977	Adriano Celentano	"Don't Play That Song"	100,000	Claimed sales
1973	Barry Blue	"Do You Wanna Dance"	100,000	Claimed sales
1967	Engelbert Humperdinck	"Release Me"	100,000	Claimed sales
1973	Ivan Heylen	"De wilde boerendochtere"	100,000	Claimed sales
1972	Jimmy Frey	"Roses to Sandra"	100,000	Claimed sales
1977	Laurent Voulzy	"Rockollection"	100,000	Claimed sales
1970	Marc Hamilton	"Comme j'ai toujours envie d'aimer"	100,000	Claimed sales
1981	Ricchi e Poveri	"Sarà perché ti amo"	100,000	Claimed sales
1977	Laurent Voulzy	"Rockollection"	100,000	Claimed sales
1974	Ricky Gordon	"Such A Night"	100,000	Claimed sales
1973	Sharif Dean	"Do You Love Me?"	100,000	Claimed sales
1974	Spooky & Sue	"Swinging of A Star"	100,000	Claimed sales

Highest certified singles
Year	Artist	Title	Certified sales	Amount
1997	Elton John	"Candle in the Wind 1997"	450,000	9× Platinum
1986	Sandra Kim	"J'Aime La Vie"	300,000	2× Platinum
2002	Las Ketchup	"The Ketchup Song (Aserejé)"	250,000	5× Platinum
1997	Aqua	"Barbie Girl"	200,000	4× Platinum
2016	Lost Frequencies	"Are You with Me"	200,000	5× Platinum^{‡}
1997	Puff Daddy	"I'll Be Missing You"	200,000	4× Platinum
2019	Tones and I	"Dance Monkey"	200,000	5× Platinum^{‡}
2018	Aya Nakamura	"Djadja"	160,000	4× Platinum^{‡}
2019	Billie Eilish	"Bad Guy"	160,000	4× Platinum^{‡}
2018	Lewis Capaldi	"Someone You Loved"	160,000	4× Platinum^{‡}
2019	Lil Nas X	"Old Town Road"	160,000	4× Platinum^{‡}
2015	Lost Frequencies	"Reality"	160,000	4× Platinum^{‡}
2019	The Weeknd	"Blinding Lights"	160,000	5× Platinum^{‡}
1998	Britney Spears	"...Baby One More Time"	150,000	3× Platinum
1997	Celine Dion	"My Heart Will Go On"	150,000	3× Platinum
1997	Cher	"Believe"	150,000	3× Platinum
1995	Lou Bega	"Mambo No. 5"	150,000	3× Platinum
1998	Patrick Fiori, Daniel Lavoie & Garou	"Belle"	150,000	3× Platinum
1999	R. Kelly	"If I Could Turn Back the Hands of Time"	150,000	3× Platinum
2015	Sandra Kim	"J'aime la vie"	150,000	2× Platinum
1997	Wes	"Alane"	150,000	3× Platinum
2018	Ed Sheeran	"Shape of You"	140,000	7× Platinum^{‡}
2018	Lady Gaga & Bradley Cooper	"Shallow"	140,000	3× Platinum^{‡}
