= Awbery =

Awbery is a surname. It is a variant form of Aubrey or directly from the French form Aubery / Aubéry (See Claude Aubery, Benjamin Aubery du Maurier, etc.). Notable people with the surname include:

- Charlotte Awbery (1989–), English singer
- Stan Awbery (1888–1969), British politician and trade unionist
