= Barry Blue =

English singer, producer and songwriter (born 1950)

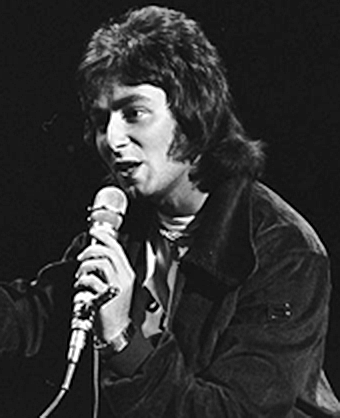
- Barry Blue on the Dutch television programme 'Popzien', 8 June 1973

Background information
- Born: Barry Ian Green; 4 December 1950 (age 75); London, England
- Genres: Pop, glam rock
- Occupations: Singer-songwriter, record producer
- Instrument: Vocalist
- Years active: 1964–present
- Labels: Bell Records, Decca, Private Stock, Jet, Bruton Music
- Website: https://BarryBlue.co.uk

Barry Blue (born Barry Ian Green; 4 December 1950) is an English singer, producer, and songwriter. As an artist, he is best known for his hit songs "Dancin' (on a Saturday Night)" and "Do You Wanna Dance" (both 1973).

Blue has also been a prolific songwriter and producer for many artists and has had over forty worldwide hits, including those by Andrea Bocelli, Diana Ross, Celine Dion, The Saturdays, The Wanted, and Pixie Lott. In film and television, Blue has provided soundtracks and/or themes for productions including Escape to Athena.

== Early days ==
At the age of 13, Blue (born Barry Ian Green) made his first television appearance with his school band, the Dark Knights, performing on Stubby Kaye's Silver Star Show, a weekly children's talent show hosted by Kaye via Granada TV. By the age of 14, Blue had signed with record producer Norrie Paramor, whose assistant was Tim Rice; the producer of Blue's first song "Rainmaker Girl", which became a hit for Gene Pitney in the United States. Later, he became a bassist in the line-up of Spice; the band featured Mick Box and David Byron, and was the precursor to the heavy rock band Uriah Heep. He followed this in 1966 with a two-year period in A&R at the Bee Gees' publishing company Abigail Music, under the direction of their manager Robert Stigwood.

In 1970, Blue signed as a songwriter to ATV-Kirshner located in Bruton Street, London, where he joined a group of professional songwriters that included Lynsey de Paul and Ron Roker. One of their earliest songs was "Sugarloaf Hill", recorded by the reggae artist Del Davis. Other early career notable songs co-written by Blue and de Paul include "Tip of My Tongue" for the British group Brotherly Love, as well as female vocal trio Ellie, and "House of Cards" recorded by a number of artists including John Christie, Australian artist Rob Guest, and the D.J. Tony Blackburn. Another from this period included "Crossword Puzzle", also co-written with de Paul, and which led to an appearance on Top of the Pops for Irish singer Dana. At the time, he was still using his real surname of Green.

Blue wrote his first UK singles chart hit in 1972 with de Paul, titled "Sugar Me". The song was originally written for Peter Noone, but de Paul's boyfriend at the time, Dudley Moore, suggested that she should take a demo version to manager Gordon Mills, who told her she should record it herself. The song also charted in the Netherlands, Spain, and Belgium. "Sugar Me" was also covered in the US by Nancy Sinatra and Claudine Longet.

== Career ==
He released his first record in June 1971, under his real name of Barry Green, on the Ember label titled "Together", written by Jean-Pierre Mirouze, taken from the French film Le mariage collectif. He signed to Decca Records and released four singles between 1971 and 1974, including "Papa Do". In a 2020 interview, he revealed that he decided to adopt Blue as a stage name after speaking with a record company employee who told him that green is considered an unlucky colour by circus performers, and because all the three singles released as Barry Green had been "quite unsuccessful", he eventually decided to be known as Barry Blue instead.

His first UK chart success as a performer came with the change of name, and a record deal with Bell Records in 1973. He had five hit singles, "Dancin' (on a Saturday Night)" (no. 2, 1973; co-written with de Paul), "Do You Wanna Dance?" (no. 7, 1973), "School Love" (no. 11, 1974), and "Miss Hit and Run" (no. 26, 1974), followed by his final Top 40 hit in the UK singles chart in October 1974, "Hot Shot" (co-written with de Paul), which climbed to no. 23 in the UK and reached no. 3 in Zimbabwe. Blue returned to the UK charts in 1989 with a remixed version of "Dancin' (on a Saturday Night)". Throughout 1973–74, Blue appeared on many major TV shows and tours alongside artists such as Queen, ABBA, and Status Quo.

Blue achieved a million seller in 1975 with "Kiss Me Kiss Your Baby", recorded by Brotherhood of Man. Two years later, in 1977, he co-wrote "Devil's Gun", a song by C. J. & Company from the album of the same name. The song was no. 1 on the Billboard disco/dance chart for five weeks. The single also peaked at no. 36 on the Billboard Hot 100, and no. 2 on the R&B chart.^{[2]} Written by Blue, Ron Roker, and Gerry Shury, and produced by Mike Theodore and Dennis Coffey, the song is notable for being the first record played at the opening of Studio 54 on 26 April 1977 by DJ Richie Kaczor.^{[3]} The instrumental portions of "Devil's Gun" were featured prominently in the international version of the film Crocodile. It also featured in the film The Real Bruce Lee. In 2016, the song was included in The Get Down soundtrack, and the following year it was featured in the film Borg vs McEnroe.

One of his major production successes was the multi-racial, Anglo-US funk/soul band Heatwave, who enjoyed hits in the UK and US with "Boogie Nights", "Always and Forever", "Mind Blowing Decisions", and "The Groove Line". Other funk songs produced by Blue include "Funk Theory" by Rokotto, which reached no. 49 in 1978, "Somebody Help Me Out" by Beggar and Co, which reached no. 15 in the UK in 1981, and "Say Yeah" by The Limit, which peaked at no. 17 on the UK singles chart and no. 7 on the U.S. Billboard Dance/Club Play chart in 1985.

In 1988 Blue worked again with Rod Temperton on the Siedah Garrett album, Kiss of Life (released on the Qwest label) writing the title track. In 1989, under the artist name Cry Sisco!, Blue had another minor hit with a song called "Afro Dizzi Act", which reached no. 42 on the UK singles chart.

In 2023 Blue commenced writing the English lyric adaption for the French musical Bernadette de Lourdes, based on the true life story of Bernadette Soubirous, who in the town of Lourdes in 1850s France, had 16 visions of a lady believed to be The Virgin Mary and faced ridicule, doubt and condemnation.The English language version made its debut at the Athenaeum Center in Chicago in February 2026 and then embarks on nationwide tours of the US and Canada followed by the rest of the world in 2026/7.

=== Selected songs for other artists ===
song title	artist	year	songwriter	producer	album (a) / single (s)
"I Hope and I Pray"	Alvin Stardust & Sheila Walsh	1986	Brenner, Lippell, Moss	Barry Blue	(s) see title
"E Sara' A Settembre (Someone like You)"	Andrea Bocelli	2001	B. Blue, A. Salerno, R. Smith		(a) Cieli di Toscana
"Old Flame Burnin'"	Andy Gillin	1989	B. Blue, J. Cavanagh	Uno Hoo	(s) see title
"We All Work Out"	Beggar and Co	1982	Jonathan Perkins	Barry Blue	(s) see title
"Trop jeune à dix-sept ans"	Celine Dion	1984	Barry Blue, P. Greedus	Eddy Marnay Rudi Pascal	(a) Les oiseaux du bonheur
"Who"	Diana Ross	1982	Barry Blue, Rod Bowkett	Diana Ross, Michael Jackson	(a) Silk Electric
"Escaping"	Margaret Urlich	1989	Barry Blue, Robyn Smith	Nigel Lowis	(a) Only Human
"What a Bitch Is Love"	Marcia Hines	1982	Paul Greedus, Barry Blue	Dave MacKay	(s) see title
"Love the Way You Love Me"	Marti Caine	1981	Blue, Greedus	Blueytunes Productions	(a) Point of View
"The Little Things"	Matt Monro	1976	Blue, Worth	John Burgess	(s) see title
"Tremblin'"	Mel Smith	1986	Barry Blue, Paul Greedus	Pete Wingfield	(s) see title
"No Time to Be Hurt"	Pixie Lott	2009	Barry Blue, Pixie Lott	Barry Blue	(a) Turn It Up (unreleased)
"Just a Disillusion"	Sandie Shaw	1976	W. & M. J. P. Vermuelem	Barry Blue	(s) see title
"Flashback"	The Saturdays	2010	The Saturdays	Barry Blue	(s) Ego
"Radiator Rock"	The Sting-rays	1982	Paul Greedus, Barry Blue	Paul Greedus	(s) see title
"Replace Your Heart"	The Wanted	2010	Cathy Dennis, Kasia Livingston	Barry Blue, Greg Kurstin	(a) The Wanted
"Don't You Remember When"	Vera Lynn	1976	De Paul, Blue	De Paul	(s) see title
"Travelin' On"	Acker Bilk & Paramount Jazz Band	1972	Blik, Green, Mazi	Terry Brown	(a) Acker Pie
"Je compte jusqu'à toi"	Patricia Kaas	1997	Barry Blue, Robyn Smith, Zazie	Jefferey (C.J.) Vanston	(a) Dans ma chair
"Love in Me"	Danni Minogue	2009	Blue, Mallozzi, Sabiu	Rapino Bros	(a) The 1995 Sessions
"New York Moon"	Louise	1997	Barry Blue, Robyn Smith	Steve Levine	(a) Woman in Me
"Love Bomb"	Cheryl Lynn	1980	De Paul, B. Blue	Barry Blue	(s) see title

=== Chart hits as a songwriter ===
- "Sugar Me" for Lynsey de Paul (1972) – a worldwide million seller
- "Tip of My Tongue" for Brotherly Love (1973)
- "Dancin' (on a Saturday Night)" for Barry Blue (1973)
- "Do You Wanna Dance" for Barry Blue (1973)
- "School Love" for Barry Blue (1974)
- "Miss Hit and Run" for Barry Blue (1974)
- "Hot Shot" for Barry Blue (1974)
- "Ooh I Do" for Lynsey de Paul (1974)
- "Dancin' (on a Saturday Night)" for Flash Cadillac & Continental Kids (1974)
- "Kiss Me Kiss Your Baby" for Brotherhood of Man (a European million seller) (1975)
- "Devil's Gun" for C. J. & Company (1977)
- "Funk Theory" for Rokotto (1978)
- "One More Minute" for Saint Tropez (USA chart hit, plus no. 9 Dance chart) (1979)
- "And I Wish" for The Dooleys (1979)
- "I Eat Cannibals" for Toto Coelo (1982)
- "Dracula's Tango (Sucker for Your Love)" for Toto Coelo (1982)
- "All Fall Down" for Five Star (1985)
- "Dancin' (on a Saturday Night)" (reissue) for Barry Blue (1989)
- "Escaping" for Asia Blue (1992)
- "Escaping" for Margaret Urlich (1989)
- "Escaping" for Dina Carroll (1996)
- "Je Compte Jusqu'à Toi" for Patricia Kaas (1997)

=== Chart hits as a producer ===
- "Fairytale" for Dana (1976)
- "Boogie Nights" for Heatwave (1977)
- "Have I the Right" for Dead End Kids (1977)
- "Too Hot to Handle" / "Slip Your Disc to This" for Heatwave (1977)
- "The Groove Line" for Heatwave (1977)
- "Mind Blowing Decisions" for Heatwave (1978)
- "Always and Forever" for Heatwave (1978)
- "Something's Cooking in the Kitchen" for Dana (1979)
- "I've Got Faith in You" for Cheryl Lynn (USA R&B hit) (1980)
- "(Somebody) Help Me Out" for Beggar and Co (1981)
- "Cheers Then" for Bananarama (1982)
- "Say Yeah" for Limit (ft. Gwen Guthrie) (1985)
- "Mony Mony" for Amazulu (1987)
- "Afro Dizzi Act" for Cry Sisco! (1989)

=== Film, television and advertising ===
Blue has provided soundtracks and/or themes for various productions:

==== TV themes / songs ====
- The Golden Shot
- Alexander the Greatest
- Shirley's World
- Lift Off
- Billy Liar
- Come Midnight Monday
- Praying Mantis
- Puhd Aineet
- Dia Spot Autogrip
- Oppenheimer
- Faszinationen
- Sharp Intake of Breath
- Sex in the City
- Breaking Bad
- The Getdown
- Path to 911
- Only Fools and Horses
- Coronation Street
- The Benny Hill Show
- Eastenders

==== Film themes / songs ====
- Escape to Athena
- Eyes of Laura Mars
- The Long Good Friday
- The Boy Who Won the Pools
- Chico and the Man
- Felicity
- Ishikawa Hiduni
- Kids World
- The Sweeney
- Girls, Girls, Girls
- Mackenzie Appointed
- Mompti
- Side by Side
- The Get Down
- The Real Bruce Lee
- Crocodile
- Borg vs. McEnroe
- Anita & Me
- Top Boy
- Money Heist

==== Advertising ====
- British Airways
- Walls
- Honda
- Ford
- Fabreze
- B & Q
- Airbus Industries
- Camelot
- McDonald's
- Paramount Pictures
- Wella

== Discography ==
=== Albums ===
==== Studio albums ====
Title	Album details
Barry Blue	Released: 1974; Label: Bell; Formats: LP, MC
Hot Shots	Released: October 1974; Label: Bell; Formats: LP, MC, 8-track
Rock 'n' Roll (with Miki Antony and Dave Rowberry)	Released: 1975; Label: Regency; Formats: LP
Disco Happening (with Miki Antony and Tom Parker)	Released: 1978; Label: Bruton Music; Formats: LP
Songs from the Heart Book	Released: 18 September 2020; Label: Gonzo Multimedia; Formats: CD, digital download

==== Compilation albums ====
Title	Album details
Dancin' on a Saturday Night	Released: 1975; Label: Sounds Superb; Formats: LP
Dancin' on a Saturday Night – The Best of Barry Blue	Released: July 1977; Label: Pickwick; Formats: LP, MC, 8-track
The Best of & The Rest Of	Released: 1989; Label: Action Replay; Formats: CD
Dancin' on a Saturday Night – The Very Best of Barry Blue	Released: May 1993; Label: Music Club; Formats: CD, MC
Greatest Hits	Released: 1996; Label: Hallmark; Formats: CD
Greatest Hits	Released: February 1999; Label: Repertoire; Formats: CD
The Singles Collection	Released: December 2002; Label: 7T's; Formats: CD
Dancin' (on a Saturday Night)... Best Of	Released: November 2003; Label: Castle Music; Formats: 2xCD
The Very Best of Barry Blue	Released: 18 June 2012; Label: Demon Music Group; Formats: 2xCD, digital download
Out of the Blue – 50 Years of Discovery	Released: 28 May 2021; Label: Edsel; Formats: 4xCD, digital download

=== EPs ===
Title	Album details
Boy in the Moon	Released: 24 May 2019; Label: Favoured Nations; Formats: CD, digital download

=== Singles ===
Title	Year	Peak chart positions									
Title	Year	UK	AUS	AUT	BE (FL)	BE (WA)	GER	IRE	NL	SPA	ZIM
"Together" (as Barry Green; from the film Collective Marriage)	1971	—	—	—	—	—	—	—	—	—	—
"I Wanna Join the Cavalry" (as Barry Green)	1971	—	—	—	—	—	—	—	—	—	—
"Alexander the Greatest" (as Barry Green)	1971	—	—	—	—	—	—	—	—	—	—
"Papa Do" (as Barry Green)	1972	—	—	—	—	—	—	—	—	—	—
"Dancin' (on a Saturday Night)"	1973	2	2	3	13	15	9	4	11	19	10
"Shake-a-Tail" (as Big Wheel)	1973	—	—	—	—	—	—	—	—	—	—
"Do You Wanna Dance?"	1973	7	38	—	9	32	11	14	11	—	—
"School Love"	1974	11	31	—	—	—	—	—	—	—	9
"Miss Hit and Run"	1974	26	—	—	—	—	—	—	—	—	—
"Hot Shot"	1974	23	—	—	—	—	—	—	—	—	3
"You Make Me Happy (When I'm Blue)"	1975	—	—	—	—	—	—	—	—	—	—
"If I Show You I Can Dance"	1975	—	—	—	—	—	—	—	—	—	—
"Devil's Gun" (Germany-only release)	1975	—	—	—	—	—	—	—	—	—	—
"Happy Christmas to You from Me" (with Lynsey de Paul)	1975	—	—	—	—	—	—	—	—	—	—
"Tough Kids"	1976	—	—	—	—	—	—	—	—	—	—
"Billy"	1977	—	—	—	—	—	—	—	—	—	—
"A Lover Lovin' You"	1977	—	—	—	—	—	—	—	—	—	—
"Dancin' (on a Saturday Night) '89"	1989	86	—	—	—	—	—	—	—	—	—
"—" denotes releases that did not chart or were not released in that territory.

== Honours, awards, and achievements ==
- 1965: Silver Star (Stubby Kaye’s talent show)
- 1973: Carl Allan Award – Record of The Year (Dancing’ On A Saturday Night)
- 1977: 6 BMI / ASCAP Awards (Heatwave USA)
- 1977: Councillor – BASCA
- 1977: Music Week – Market Survey Top Record Producer
- 1986: Founded Aosis Studios in London
- 1989: Founded The Escape Artist Company
- 1995: Founded Connect 2 Music
- 2007: Founded Plan 8 Music
- 2010: Director, PRS for Music Ltd (2010–2019)
- 2014: Director, Karma Songs
