= Del Davis (singer) =

Del Davis is a reggae singer of the 1970s. His cover of "World Without Love" was featured on Mellow Dubmarine. His 1972 single "Sugarloaf Hill", released on 15 September 1972 on the Trojan Record label received favourable reviews in the music press at that time.we It was included on the Trojan Carnival Box Set compilation album, released in 2003, and was rated as one of the album's highlights by AllMusic. His reggae version of "World Without Love" appeared on the album A Reggae Tribute To The Beatles, and his version of the Gerry and the Pacemakers hit song "How Do You Do It?" was released as a duet with Jackie Edwards.

== Discography ==
- "Susanne" / "I Need Your Love" – Del Davis/Gene Laro
- "Love Sweet Love" / "Open The Door"
- "Baby Don't Wake Me" / Wishing And Hoping - Del Davis
- "Sugarloaf Hill" / "Baby Don't Wake Me" – A-side written by Lynsey de Paul, Barry Blue and Ron Roker
- "World Without Love"
- "How Do You Do It?" by Jackie Edwards and Del Davis is a track on the album The Story of Trojan Records (2011)
