= Tip of My Tongue (Lynsey de Paul song) =

Single by Brotherly Love
- B-side: "I Love Everything About You"
- Released: April 27, 1973
- Genre: Pop
- Length: 2:33
- Label: CBS
- Songwriters: Lynsey de Paul, Barry Blue
- Producer: Phil Wainman

"Tip of My Tongue" is a song written by Lynsey de Paul and Barry Blue (credited initially as "Green") that was originally registered as "On the Tip of My Tongue" (ISWC:T0104548028). It has been a modest hit in different territories for at least 4 artists (Brotherly Love, Ellie, The Great Rufus Road Machine and The Dooleys) during the 1970's and 1980's and is also a Barry Blue fan favourite. It's been compared to B.J. Thomas' 1968 hit, "Hooked On a Feeling", sharing similar tunes and an electric sitar solo. In 2025, Brotherly Love's version was included on the chart hit compilation album "Chip Shop Pop".

== Brotherly Love ==
The song was first recorded and released as the fifth single by Brotherly Love (a Liverpool-based group composed of three brothers, Mike, Ronnie and Lee Carroll, who are brothers of impressionist Faith Brown) with the song "I Love Everything About You" as the flip side on CBS Records on 27 April 1973. and was produced by Phil Wainman. According to music journalist James Craig, de Paul was in the audience for a Brotherly Love performance at Gulliver's and was so impressed with them that she co-penned "Tip of My Tongue" for them. The trio performed the song on the Granada TV programme Lift Off With Ayshea on 22 June 1973. The song received positive reviews from the British mainstream press as well as the music press, and the brothers were interviewed about the single It made the top of the UK chart breakers listing on 23 May 1973 (would equate to #51 if the chart had gone beyond a Top 50) but, subsequently, did not manage to enter the UK Top 50 single chart UK Singles Chart. Barry Blue was credited as "Barry Green" on this release. Brotherly Love's 1973 version of the song was finally released on CD in 2022, on a compilation entitled Bubblerock is Here to Stay Vol. 2: The British Pop Explosion 1970-73. A year later, it was released as a track on Singles Collection - Brotherly Love.

In July 2025, it was released as a track on Bob Stanley Presents Chip Shop Pop. In his review of the album arts journalist Kieron Tyler, stated "Then there's Brotherly Love's "Tip of my Tongue", a 1973 single written by Barry Green/Blue and Lynsey De Paul, and sung by the remnants of Sixties vocal outfit The Carrolls. Had David Cassidy recorded it, it would have topped the charts for weeks". The album entered the UK compilation albums chart at No. 73, and the Dutch compilation albums chart at No. 16, and No. 11 on the Belgian compilation albums chart in August 2025.

== Ellie ==
The female soul trio Ellie (aka the Hope Sisters - Ellie, Christine and Kathy) released their version of "Tip of My Tongue" produced by Barry Blue as a single (backed by "Someone's Stolen My Marbles") on the Fresh Air record label in the UK, on London Records in North America and on the Phillips label in Germany, France and Australia in 1974. The song received generally positive review in the press with "The Stage" writing "Great new single "On the Tip of my Tongue" under the new name of Ellie on the Fresh air record label". Ellie performed the song on the German TV music program, Hits a Go Go, on 22 October 1974. The song also had a modicum of success in Europe, reflected by the fact that it was included on the German and Austrian releases of the 1975 compilation album Various – 26 Original Top Hits as well as on the French compilation albums Hit-Parade Printemps Phonogram 1975 Spécial Discothèque, and Alcazar D'été on the Philips label. It was also chosen as record of the week by Dutch DJ Frans van der Drift at Radio Mi Amigo on 29 December 1974, and Canadian radio station CFSX by DJ Phil Smith. Ellie Hope went on to form Liquid Gold where she was the lead singer. Ellie's version of the song is still played on radio, for example on 1 November 2014 by the German independent radio station, Radio X, Frankfurter Stadtradio (FM 91.8).

== The Great Rufus Road Machine ==
In December 1977, the Canadian band, The Great Rufus Road Machine, formed in 1972 by husband and wife team of Ron Russell (vocals) and Sharon Russell (vocals) with John “The Fly” Baye (drums), Dirk Acree (bass, trumpet) and Ken LaDéroute (vocals, guitar)), from Kitchener, Ontario, recorded the song and released it as a single, with "Can't You Do It Now" as the B-side of the single. It reached number 26 on the RPM Adult Oriented Playlist week of April 1, 1978 and both songs received major airplay success in Canada (131 stations) with the band also performing "Tip of My Tongue" on Canadian TV. "Tip of My Tongue" was also included as the lead track on their self-named album, although the version released as a single was remixed.

== The Dooleys ==
The British band The Dooleys also recorded their version of the song as a track on their 1981 album, Secrets, which was suggested by the album's producer Barry Blue. The album was renamed The Dancer for its release in Japan and made number 41 on the Japanese Albums Chart. The Dooleys version of the song was finally released on CD in 2013 on the Full House / Secrets double album, as well as on the album The Dooleys Greatest Hits, and also on the three CD compilation set, Gold, released in 2021.

== Barry Blue ==
The song's co-writer, Barry Blue, released his own recording of the song arranged by Gerry Shury and produced by Blue as a track on his self named debut album in 1974. The album peaked at No.68 on the Australian Kent album chart in 1974. This version was later featured on the compilation albums Dancin' (On A Saturday Night)... Best Of, the German release Greatest Hits, as well as The Very Best of Barry Blue, released in 2012. In 2021, Blue's recording of the song appeared on his four compilation album release, Out of the Blue - 50 years Discovery.
