= Happy Christmas to You from Me =

Song by Lynsey de Paul and Barry Blue

"Happy Christmas to You from Me" is a song co-written by Lynsey de Paul and Barry Blue. They released their recording of the song (backed with another co-written song "Stick to You") on 28 November 1975 on Jet Records. De Paul and Blue also produced the A and B sides. Angie Porter was one of the children singing on "Happy Christmas to You from Me" at the age of eight. She went on to become a singer and songwriter and cites her involvement in the recording as a career defining moment.

The released was announced in Billboard, Music Week, Record World, and Record Mirror the song received favourable reviews in the mainstream press and international music press with Su Byrom of Record Mirror writing "The words are as corny as those inside most Christmas cards and, it being the festive season, just as acceptable. The melody is bright and pretty and Lynsey and Barry's voices blend beautifully, with Lynsey giving out some nice, tingly high notes". Some years later "Happy Christmas to You from Me" was still listed by the BBC Radio 1 in their "Sleighlist".

The song was also released on the compilation album It Takes Two, released in September 1983 The album received positive reviews with Music Week writing "Love duets which have all had big success". "It Takes Two" was reissued in 1986. The recording finally appeared on CD as a track on The Singles Collection by Barry Blue in 2002 as well as on the double CD Dancin' (On A Saturday Night)... Best Of.

== Cover versions ==
Japanese duo Seiki Sato (instruments) and vocalist Yuko Iiizumi recorded their version of the song on 21 November 2012 on "Night Flight" released on vinyl and CD single as Microstar. It appeared on Christmas x Christmas on Shiromaru Records in 2012 where it was selected by DJ Shiromaru It receives seasonal airplay on radio in Japan.

A children's choir, Critz Kids, from Long Island, New York, US, performed a version of "Happy Christmas to You from Me" in 2001. This version was chosen by their music teacher who was looking for a song with a healing message after September 11 attacks that year.

== Radio play ==
The song often gets radio plays around the Christmas holiday season, notably on "Radio International - the Ultimate Eurovision Experience" transmitted by Switch Radio and the BBC. In December 2024, the song was played on Cat Radio, Bangkok, Boom Radio, Radio International and featured in Carl Palm's Advent Calendar of Christmas music. In December 2024, it was included in "The Radio International Christmas Card and Soundtrack to your Christmas" broadcast by Malta's Radio 105FM and also on "This is cat radio", Bangkok.

== Sheet music and lyric books ==
The music and lyrics have been featured in numerous books such as Christmas Solos for the Recorder and 101 Christmas Hits for Buskers. The licensing rights for the song has been acquired by music company Cherry Red Records.
