= Mellow Dubmarine =

Compilation album by Various artists
- Released: November 27, 2001
- Genre: Reggae
- Length: 106:42
- Label: Recall Records

Mellow Dubmarine is a double album featuring reggae covers of various Beatles songs. A handful of Wings, Paul McCartney, John Lennon and George Harrison solo tracks are also featured. The tracks compiled were apparently recorded between the late 1960s and 2000. Several songs are covered by more than one artist – for example, there are three versions of "Let It Be". The album is hard to find in stores.

== Track listing ==
=== Disc one ===
1. "I Will" – John Holt – 3:36
2. "My Sweet Lord" – Keith Lynn – 3:24
3. "You Won't See Me" – Ernie Smith – 3:56
4. "Hey Jude" – The Dynamites – 2:51
5. "Get Back" – Anonymously Yours – 3:00
6. "Let It Be" – The Soulettes – 3:32
7. "Lady Madonna" – The Crystalites – 2:28
8. "Carry That Weight" – Dobbie Dobson – 2:50
9. "Don't Let Me Down" – Marcia Griffiths – 3:23
10. "Ob La Di Ob La Da" – The Heptones – 3:23
11. "Eleanor Rigby" – B B Seaton – 3:02
12. "You Never Know (I'll Be Back)" – Errol Dunkley – 3:34
13. "Blackbird Singing (Blackbird)" – R Sweat And The Paragons – 2:33
14. "All Day Night (A Hard Days Night)" – Sugar Minott – 3:9
15. "Something" – Phyllis Dillon – 3:30
16. "Yesterday" – Tyrone Taylor – 3:00

=== Disc two ===
1. "Yesterday" – Dandy Livingstone – 3:02
2. "Let It Be" – The Mohawks – 4:20
3. "Something" – The Johnny Arthry Orchestra – 2:44
4. "My Sweet Lord" – Fitzroy Sterling – 3:05
5. "Come Together" – The Israelites – 3:02
6. "Hey Jude" – Rico And The Rudies – 3:06
7. "World Without Love" – Del Davis – 2:23
8. "In My Life" – Jackie Robinson – 3:20
9. "Ob La Di Ob La Da" – Joyce Bond – 3:08
10. "Imagine" – Susan Cadogan – 3:16
11. "Isn't It a Pity" – Nicky Thomas – 5:20
12. "And I Love Her" – The Mohawks – 3:06
13. "Here Comes the Sun" – Dawn Penn – 3:37
14. "Happy Xmas (War Is Over)" – John Holt – 4:08
15. "Norwegian Wood" – Marshall Williams – 2:19
16. "My Love" – Ken Boothe – 2:46
17. "Let It Be" – Nicky Thomas – 2:49

== See also ==
- The Beatles
