= Hot Shot (Barry Blue song) =

"Hot Shot" is a song written by Barry Blue and Lynsey de Paul, that was released as a single on 2 September 1974 on the Bell Record label by Barry Blue. It was Blue's last chart entry with an original song, reaching No. 23 on the UK Singles Chart. Despite this, it is considered as one of Blue's best songs. The song was also his biggest hit in Sweden where it reached No. 1 on the Poporama singles chart, and in Zimbabwe where it peaked at No. 3. "Hot Shot" also reached No. 8 on the Hessischer Rundfunk Hitparade, and spent three weeks on the Dutch Tipparade in 1975, peaking at No. 19.

Blue performed the song on twice on BBC TV's Top of the Pops on 11 October 1974 as a new release, and on 31 October 1974 when it entered the UK Singles Chart at No. 29. The latter show also featured the song's co-writer, Lynsey de Paul, who was performing her own hit at the time "No Honestly". He also performed the song on the pop music program, Lift Off with Ayshea.

As well as being included on Blue's 1974 Hot Shots album, "Hot Shot" has been included on many compilation albums. In 1996, it appeared for the first time on CD as a track on Blue's album Greatest Hits. In 2002, it appeared as a track on Barry Blue - The Singles Collection, and in 2003 on Dancin on a Saturday Night. It also was a track on the 1975 compilation album, Supersonic, the 1976 K-Tel album, 44 Superstars, the German 1974 compilation Hit-Fabrik - 28 Schlager Am Laufenden Band on the Polydor label, the Austrian 1975 compilation LP Pop Market 1, and provided the title as well as one of the track to the album Bell's Hot Shots Of The 70's. In the US it appeared on A History Of Bell U.K. 1970-1975, which was released in 1976 on the Arista label.
