= Shape of You =

2017 single by Ed Sheeran

Single by Ed Sheeran

from the album ÷
- Released: 6 January 2017
- Recorded: November 2015
- Studio: Rokstone (London); Gingerbread Man (Suffolk and London)
- Genre: Pop; dancehall; tropical house
- Length: 3:54
- Label: Asylum; Atlantic
- Songwriters: Ed Sheeran; Johnny McDaid; Kandi Burruss; Kevin Briggs; Steve Mac; Tameka Cottle
- Producers: Ed Sheeran; Steve Mac

Ed Sheeran singles chronology
"Lay It All on Me" (2015)	"Castle on the Hill" / "Shape of You" (2017)	"Galway Girl" (2017)

Music video
- "Shape of You" on YouTube

"Shape of You" is a song by English singer Ed Sheeran. It was released on 6 January 2017 as one of the double lead singles from his third studio album ÷ (2017), along with "Castle on the Hill". The dancehall and R&B infused song was written by Sheeran, Steve Mac and Johnny McDaid. Due to its interpolation of "No Scrubs" by TLC, Kandi Burruss, Tameka "Tiny" Cottle, and Kevin "She'kspere" Briggs are also credited as writers. The song was produced by Sheeran and Steve Mac.

Despite receiving mixed reviews from music critics, "Shape of You" peaked at number one on the singles charts of 34 countries, including the US Billboard Hot 100—later becoming the best performing song of 2017—as well as in the British, Australian, Canadian and Irish singles charts. It stayed at number one for a record-tying 16 consecutive weeks on the Canadian Hot 100, as well as 14 nonconsecutive weeks on the UK Singles Chart, and 12 non-consecutive weeks on the Billboard Hot 100. It was also highly successful elsewhere, reaching number one in many European charts and throughout Latin America, as well as in Malaysia where it spent 12 non-consecutive weeks at the top.

On 10 December 2018, the song became the first song to hit 2 billion streams on Spotify. On July 13, 2026, “Shape of You” became the second song to reach 5 billion streams on the platform and is currently the 2nd most streamed song overall, behind "Blinding Lights" by The Weeknd. It was also the most-streamed song of the decade on Spotify with 2.4 billion streams by December 2019, and the most streamed song on Apple Music with 930 million streams, as of May 2023. It was the best-selling song of 2017 and the decade in the UK. "Shape of You" was the best-selling song of 2017 and the second best-selling digital song worldwide, with combined sales and track-equivalent streams of 26.6 million units according to IFPI.

In 2018, it sold an additional 14.9 million copies, combining a total of 41.5 million copies worldwide with the previous total sales figure, making it one of the best selling digital singles of all time. Additionally, it made a second appearance in the Billboard year-end chart in 2018, at No. 71. In 2019, it was named the number-one song on the Billboard Mainstream Top 40 chart of the 2010s decade. "Shape of You" was nominated for British Single of the Year and British Video of the Year at the 2018 Brit Awards. The song won the Grammy Award for Best Pop Solo Performance at the 60th Annual Grammy Awards. In 2021, Billboard ranked "Shape of You" as the tenth most successful song of all time.

== Background ==
Written and recorded in 2016, "Shape of You" was the final song added to Ed Sheeran's third album ÷. As he had recently written all the songs he wanted for the album, the song was therefore not intended to be included in the album. It was first written for Little Mix and then it was conceived as a duet between Rihanna and Rudimental, but the head of the record label convinced him to keep the song for himself. He said:

"['Shape of You'] is actually a really random one because I went in to write songs for other people with a guy called Steve Mac and Johnny McDaid, and we were writing this song and I was like 'this would really work for Rihanna,'" he explained. "And then I started singing lyrics like 'putting Van the Man on the jukebox' and I was like 'well she's not really going to sing that, is she?' And then we sort of decided halfway through that we were just going to make it for me."

According to Sheeran, Steve Mac started the songwriting session by playing the opening notes of the song on the keyboard. Sheeran then joined in, adding percussion by tapping on the guitar, layering it onto the track. On the writing of the song, he said that he tried to keep the music "more stripped" instead of something more elaborate: "I'm an acoustic artist, first and foremost. And when I play live, I can't replicate these things, I haven't got all the other musicians." Sheeran said he wanted an R&B feel to the song, therefore he adjusted the original tune, adding an interpolation of "No Scrubs" onto part of the melody. He also revealed that the original lyrics did not end with the words "the shape of you" in the chorus, but during the writing of the song, McDaid thought that the lyrics "I'm in love with your body" sounded objectifying, and the lyrics was therefore adjusted. In a March 2023 interview with Rolling Stone, Sheeran revealed that he had attempted to get a Jay-Z guest verse; Jay-Z declined, stating that he "doesn't think the song needs a rap verse".

== Release ==
On 6 January 2017, when hosting The Radio 1 Breakfast Show, Sheeran revealed that "Shape of You" was written with Rihanna in mind. On 4 January 2017, Sheeran uploaded a six-second teaser video of a blue background to social media, with lyrics "the club isn't the best place to find a lover", which is the first line of "Shape of You". To further tease the release, Sheeran and his label used a sponsored Snapchat lens filter with 30 seconds of the song to increase buzz among the general public.

== Composition ==
"Shape of You" has been characterised as pop, dancehall, and tropical house, with "strummy acoustics". "Shape of You" is written in the key of C-sharp minor with a tempo of 96 beats per minute. The song is composed in common time (4/4 time), and follows a basic chord progression of C♯m–F♯m–A–B (i–iv–VI–VII), and Sheeran's vocals span from G♯_{3} to G♯_{5}. It has a tresillo rhythm.

In the song, Sheeran sings over a marimba-fueled percussive sway about a budding romance: "The club isn't the best place to find a lover, so the bar is where I go/ Me and my friends at the table doing shots drinking fast and then we talk slow", he sings. "Come over and start up a conversation with just me/ And trust me I'll give it a chance." According to NT News, the song "tells the story of loved (or lusted) up Sheeran meeting a girl in a bar where he and his mates are doing shots."

The song's lyrical rhythm drew some comparisons to the 1999 TLC hit "No Scrubs", particularly in the pre-chorus line, "Boy, let's not talk too much/ Grab on my waist and put that body on me". Kandi Burruss had told Bravo's Andy Cohen that the negotiations had started before the song's release for its interpolation but weren't finalized until afterwards. As a result, the composers of "No Scrubs", Kandi Burruss, Tameka "Tiny" Cottle, and Kevin "She'kspere" Briggs, received co-writing credits on "Shape of You".

== Critical reception ==
The song received generally mixed reviews from music critics. Jon Caramanica from The New York Times said, "'Shape of You' is trickier, a nimble and effective song that takes the aggressive thinning of 'Caribbean music'." Billboard's Taylor Weatherby wrote about the song saying, "'Shape of You' doesn't quite sound like your typical Sheeran tune. But that almost serves as an indication of what the 'Thinking Out Loud' singer has been up to during his hiatus: creating music that still feels like Sheeran, just with a new twist." Jeremy Gordon of Spin gave the song a positive review, stating that the song "is a plausible attempt at convincing us he has had sex ... a lot of it. It kind of slaps, though you can't really picture Sheeran ever saying 'put that body on me' to a real human woman." Entertainment Weekly gave the song a B+ rating, and Rolling Stone ranked the song at number 13 on its "50 best songs of 2017" list. USA Today ranked it at number 36 of 2017 singles.

Uproxx ranked the song at number 3 on its "The Worst Songs Of 2017" list: "The contrarian in me is always tempted to defend Ed Sheeran, because it's way too easy to take shots at this guy... Then I hear the part in 'Shape Of You' where he says, 'And last night you were in my room / And now my bedsheets smell like you.' And now I want to push him into a locker." Spin and Esquire listed it as one of the worst songs of 2017.

== Commercial performance ==
"Shape of You" debuted at number one on the UK Singles Chart on 13 January 2017, selling 227,000 combined units in its first week and becoming Sheeran's third UK number one. Sheeran also debuted at number two with the song "Castle on the Hill", making him the first artist in UK chart history to debut in the top two positions simultaneously. It spent 13 consecutive weeks at number one, and a further week at the top after a week's interruption by Harry Styles' "Sign of the Times". In July 2017, the song reached 184 million in streams, making it the most-streamed song in the UK of all time until November 2022, when it was overtaken by Lewis Capaldi's "Someone You Loved". It was the nation's highest selling and most streamed track of 2017 with 787,000 copies sold and 248 million streams throughout the year, to produce a combined sales of 3.2 million. In September 2020, the track was certified eight-times platinum by the British Phonographic Industry (BPI). "Shape of You" is Sheeran's best-selling single in the UK with total sales of 5.09 million units as of July 2021, according to the Official Charts Company.

The song debuted at number one on the Billboard Hot 100, selling 240,000 downloads and gaining 20 million streams in its debut week in the US, becoming Sheeran's first number one song in the country. Sheeran also became the first artist to debut two songs in the top 10 the same week in the history of the Hot 100, with "Castle on the Hill" also debuting at number six. "Shape of You" topped the Hot 100 for 12 non-consecutive weeks. In its fourth week at number one, the song also topped the Mainstream Top 40, becoming Sheeran's second number-one single on the chart (after 2015's "Thinking Out Loud"). On 6 May 2017, it fell to number two on the Hot 100, being displaced by Kendrick Lamar's "Humble". On the issue date, 2 September 2017, "Shape of You" spent its 32nd week in the top ten of Hot 100, tying the record for the most weeks on that chart with LeAnn Rimes' "How Do I Live" and the Chainsmokers' "Closer" featuring Halsey. The following week, "Shape of You" spent its 33rd consecutive week in the top 10, breaking the 20-year-old record. This record would be tied twice and eventually broken in 2020 by Post Malone's "Circles." On Billboard's Dance/Mix Show Airplay chart, "Shape of You" became Sheeran's first number one on a Dance/EDM chart (his third top ten and sixth overall at Dance/Mix Show Airplay) in the United States. Afterwards, the song topped Dance Club Songs in its 18 March 2017 issue, his first as a solo artist and his second entry on this chart, when he was a featured artist on Rudimental's "Lay It All on Me", which peaked at No. 38 in 2016. By August 2017, "Shape of You" was the best selling song of 2017 in the US with 2.3 million copies sold, the only one to sell over two million. It is also the most streamed song with 799.7 million combined audio and video streams. The song became the number one song of the year on Billboard Hot 100 in 2017, and the second best-selling song in the US after "Despacito" with over 2.5 million copies sold.

It debuted at number one in France, and was later certified diamond there. According to Pure Charts, in the first half of the year 2017, the song reached 631,000 units (105,000 sales and 526,000 units from streams) and as of September 2017, it exceeds 812,109 units (707,109 from streams). It was the best-selling song (including streaming) in France this year. In Australia, the song stayed at No. 1 for 15 weeks, breaking a record set 22 years ago by Coolio's "Gangsta's Paradise". In doing this, it also broke ABBA's record of fourteen weeks at number one, which was set on the previous Australian charts before the ARIA charts became Australia's official charts. "Shape of You" was also Australia's highest selling song of 2017 with 630,000 copies sold by the end of the year. The song is the first ever number one single of the now-defunct Philippine Hot 100 upon the chart's inception on 12 June 2017. It stayed at the peak position for 4 consecutive weeks before it was dethroned by "Despacito" by Luis Fonsi and Daddy Yankee featuring Justin Bieber.

Worldwide, the song reached one billion streams on Spotify in June 2017. It became the most streamed song on Spotify in September 2017, reaching 1,318,420,396 streams overtaking Drake's "One Dance". It became the first song to reach 2 billions in streams on Spotify in 2018, and it was the most-streamed song of the decade on Spotify, with 2.4 billion streams in the 2010s. On 22 December 2021, "Shape of You" became Spotify's first song to hit 3 billion streams. In May 2023, Apple Music announced that "Shape of You" was the most-streamed song on the platform, with over 930 million streams.

In August 2018, Billboard published a new edition of the "Greatest of All Time Hot 100 Singles" chart, its list of the 100 best-performing songs in the history of the Hot 100. "Shape of You" was ranked at number nine, the third-highest position of any song released in the 2010s (behind only "Uptown Funk" by Mark Ronson featuring Bruno Mars and "Party Rock Anthem" by LMFAO featuring Lauren Bennett and GoonRock). "Shape of You" fell by one position in the 2021 update of the chart.

== Copyright trial ==
In March 2022, Sheeran was taken to court by musicians Sami Chokri and Ross O'Donoghue who allege "Shape of You" infringes "particular lines and phrases" of their 2015 composition "Oh Why". Sheeran and his co-writers, Steven McCutcheon and John McDaid, were suspended by music licensing body PRS for Music from collecting an estimated £20m in royalties from the performances or broadcasts of "Shape of You". Legal proceedings began in May 2018, with Sheeran and his co-writers asking the high court to declare they had not infringed Chokri and O'Donoghue's copyright. Two months later, Chokri and O'Donoghue issued their own claim for "copyright infringement, damages and an account of profits in relation to the alleged infringement".

On 6 April 2022, the judge ruled that Sheeran had "neither deliberately nor subconsciously copied" Chokri's song. While there were "similarities between the one-bar phrase", the judge said that "differences between the relevant parts" of the songs were "compelling evidence that the 'Oh I' phrase" in Sheeran's song "originated from sources other than Oh Why". After the win, Sheeran said: "I feel like claims like this are way too common now and have become a culture where a claim is made with the idea that a settlement will be cheaper than taking it to court, even if there's no basis for the claim. It's really damaging to the songwriting industry. There's only so many notes and very few chords used in pop music. Coincidence is bound to happen if 60,000 songs are being released every day on Spotify. That's 22 million songs a year, and there's only 12 notes that are available."

== Lyric video ==
On January 5th 2017, to accompany the song's release, a lyric video for "Shape of You" was released on Sheeran's YouTube channel with "Castle on the Hill". As of September 2025, the official lyric video has had 932 million views on YouTube.

== Music video ==
=== Release ===
On 30 January 2017, the official music video of the song, paying homage to the Rocky films, starring US dancer and model Jennie Pegouskie and retired professional sumo wrestler Yamamotoyama Ryūta (credited as "Yama"), was released on Sheeran's channel. It was shot in Seattle, and was directed by Jason Koenig, who also directed Sheeran's fourth single "Perfect" from ÷.

=== Synopsis ===
The music video opens with Sheeran, first seen sitting down in a lonely dark room save for the sunlight that shines beside him, with footages featuring his love interest and fellow boxer (Pegouskie) and his upcoming match. As the song begins, we see Sheeran shadowboxing while Pegouskie is already at the gym ready for the workout. She hangs herself at the punching bag doing sit-ups and stretches herself. A little while later, Pegouskie shadowboxes and punches a punching bag when Sheeran lately arrives at the training carrying a bag with him. After Sheeran places his bag at the closet, he proceeds to train himself for his upcoming match trained by a personal trainer along with Pegouskie who still warms herself up. Later, Sheeran and Pegouskie head out of the gym towards a restaurant while bonding each other. Upon arriving, the couple eat and share foods like canoodling over a fried chicken as they have an intimate conversation with each other, although their dialogue is entirely mute. Afterwards, Sheeran and his girlfriend ride a taxi and make out at the back seat while the taxi driver does not notice this as he is focusing on driving. Back at the gym, Sheeran and Pegouskie physically trained hard doing various training exercises. While training, the couple embraced each other and teach one other, eventually falling in love with each other in the process. Later, Pegouskie leaves a picture and a box to Sheeran in a closet and seemingly abandons him. The scene cuts back to Sheeran who discovers a picture and a black box both seen earlier with the latter containing a blue mouthguard featuring a "÷" symbol at the front. Realizing that his girlfriend had left him (unbeknownst to him, she already is on a ship), he starts to search for her to no avail. In response to her disappointing departure, Sheeran lets out his frustration and proceeds to an intense workout that includes tire-flipping, shadowboxing, sit-up, running and push-up. Later, Sheeran participates a match he has anticipated throughout the clip but he unexpectedly encounters a Rikishi or a sumo wrestler (Yama), much to his shock. During the match, Sheeran is seen almost always avoiding Yama who constantly chases him and the latter fails to defeat the Rikishi. Sheeran ends up getting defeated and is thrown at the edge of the ring, crying in agony with the crowd encouraging him to stand up. Towards the end of the video, Yama wins the match but Pegouskie emerges the scene among the crowd flying into the ring with a karate kick in the air aiming towards Yama as the scene cuts to black with the text that reads "DIRECTED BY: JASON KOENIG". Sheeran is last seen at the end of the music video struggling to get up while lying down on the floor, but he fails to do so.

=== Reception ===
On 8 May 2017, 97 days after its release, it became one of the fastest music videos to reach 1 billion views on YouTube. As of February 2026, the music video has over 6.6 billion views on YouTube, and is the site's eighth most-watched video as well as the third most-watched music video.

== Live performances ==
Sheeran performed "Shape of You" on Saturday Night Live on 11 February 2017 and at the 59th Annual Grammy Awards the following day. On 27 February, Sheeran performed the song on The Tonight Show Starring Jimmy Fallon, with Fallon and The Roots, who used classroom instruments. On 6 July, Sheeran performed the track on US breakfast television show Today. On 27 August, Sheeran performed "Shape of You" at 2017 MTV Video Music Awards in a medley with Lil Uzi Vert and his song "XO Tour Llif3". At the NRJ Music Awards 2017 on 4 November, he performed "Shape of You" in a medley with Soprano and his song "Fresh Prince".

== Remixes and covers ==
The official remix of "Shape of You" features newly additional verses and guest vocals by English grime artist Stormzy. The remix premiered during Sheeran and Stormzy's live collaboration at the 2017 Brit Awards at The O2 in London on 22 February 2017.

Sheeran announced on Twitter that the remix would be released officially on 24 February 2017. On the same date, various remixes of the song were released on digital music services. Sheeran teased the releases ahead of 2017 Brit Awards ceremony. "I've got two things dropping on Friday that are pretty interesting", he revealed in a BBC Radio 1 interview just hours before the big show. "One that gets debuted at the Brits, which I think people will go a bit nuts for." He added, "It's something that I think nobody is expecting. I think it'll be decent."

In the United States, "Shape of You" has immediately become a favourite among DJs and remixers, prompting several of them to create their own versions. One DJ, Joe "Maz" Masurka, told Billboard that after he did his own remix on the single that he received a lot of great feedback and response: "... the dance floor loves it."

In April 2017, Aditya Rao, Vinod Krishnan and Mahesh Raghvan released a carnatic version of the song. In September 2018, Ndlovu Youth Choir and Wouter Kellerman released "Shape of You" in Zulu version.

== In other media ==
In March 2017, a Walsall woman Sonia Bryce was imprisoned for two months for noise pollution after repeatedly playing "Shape of You" at a high volume. English singer Charli XCX performed "Shape of You" in drag as Sheeran on the US television series Lip Sync Battle in March 2018. The song is featured on the dance rhythm game, Just Dance 2018. It was featured and remixed in YouTube Rewind: The Shape of 2017. The song is also used in an episode in the French version of Skam. Pentatonix covered the song as a mash-up with "Despacito" for their 2018 album PTX Presents: Top Pop, Vol. I. Likewise, the song was covered by Hawaiian ukulele artist Jake Shimabukuro for his 2018 album, The Greatest Day. The song appears often in the Japanese drama 僕たちがやりました(We Did It/Fugitive Boys).

The song also has been covered by Postmodern Jukebox, done as a Stevie Wonder-style 1970s number, guest starring Stefano Langone on lead vocals. The video amassed three million views. "Shape of You" has also been referenced in Doja Cat's "Get Into It (Yuh)", from the album Planet Her (2021). "Weird Al" Yankovic covered the song for his 2024 polka medley "Polkamania!".

== Formats and track listings ==
- Digital download and streaming
1. "Shape of You" – 3:53
- Digital download and streaming – Galantis Remix
1. "Shape of You" (Galantis Remix) – 3:15
- Digital download and streaming – Acoustic
1. "Shape of You" (Acoustic) – 3:43
- Digital download and streaming – Stormzy Remix
1. "Shape of You" (Stormzy Remix) – 3:51
- Digital download and streaming – Major Lazer Remix
1. "Shape of You" (featuring Nyla and Kramium) [Major Lazer Remix] – 3:12
- Digital download and streaming – Latin Remix
1. "Shape of You" (featuring Zion & Lennox) [Latin Remix] – 3:57
- Digital download and streaming – Yxng Bane Remix
1. "Shape of You" (Yxng Bane Remix) – 4:25
- Digital download and streaming – NOTD Remix
1. "Shape of You" (NOTD Remix) – 3:10
- CD single
1. "Shape of You" – 3:53
2. "Shape of You" (Acoustic) – 3:43

== Credits and personnel ==
Credits and personnel adapted from ÷ album liner notes.

Recording

- Recorded at Rokstone Studios (London) and Gingerbread Man Studios (Suffolk and London)
- Mixed at The Mixsuite (South London and Los Angeles)
- Mastered at Metropolis Mastering (London)

Personnel

- Ed Sheeran – songwriter, lead vocals, background vocals, co-producer, percussion
- Johnny McDaid – songwriter, guitars
- Steve Mac – songwriter, producer, keyboards
- Kandi Burruss – songwriter
- Kevin "She'kspere" Briggs – songwriter
- Tameka Cottle – songwriter
- Dann Pursey – engineering
- Chris Laws – engineering, drums
- Joe Rubel – engineering
- Mark "Spike" Stent – mixing
- Geoff Swan – mixing assistant
- Michael Freeman – mixing assistant
- Wayne Hernandez – background vocals
- Travis Cole – background vocals
- Geo Gabriel – background vocals
- Stuart Hawkes – mastering

== Charts ==
=== Weekly charts ===
Weekly chart performance
Chart (2017–2018)	Peak position
Argentina Airplay (Monitor Latino)	2
Australia (ARIA)	1
Austria (Ö3 Austria Top 40)	1
Belarus Airplay (Eurofest)	2
Belgium (Ultratop 50 Flanders)	1
Belgium (Ultratop 50 Wallonia)	1
Bolivia Anglo Airplay (Monitor Latino)	1
Brazil (Brasil Hot 100)	1
Brazil Streaming (Pro-Música Brasil)	1
Bulgaria Airplay (PROPHON)	1
Cambodia (Top 30 Singles)	1
Canada Hot 100 (Billboard)	1
Canada AC (Billboard)	1
Canada CHR/Top 40 (Billboard)	1
Canada Hot AC (Billboard)	1
Chile Airplay (Monitor Latino)	4
Chile Streaming (PROFOVI)	3
Colombia Airplay (Monitor Latino)	7
Colombia Streaming (APDIF)	1
CIS Airplay (TopHit)	1
Costa Rica Anglo Airplay (Monitor Latino)	1
Croatia International Airplay (Top lista)	1
Czech Republic Airplay (ČNS IFPI)	1
Czech Republic Singles Digital (ČNS IFPI)	1
Denmark (Tracklisten)	1
Dominican Republic Airplay (SodinPro)	6
Ecuador Airplay (National-Report)	14
El Salvador Anglo Airplay (Monitor Latino)	2
Euro Digital Song Sales (Billboard)	1
Finland (Suomen virallinen lista)	1
France (SNEP)	1
Germany (GfK)	1
Greece Digital Song Sales (Billboard)	1
Guatemala Airplay (Monitor Latino)	2
Honduras Anglo Airplay (Monitor Latino)	7
Hong Kong (HKRIA)	16
Hungary (Dance Top 40)	1
Hungary (Rádiós Top 40)	1
Hungary (Single Top 40)	1
Hungary (Stream Top 40)	1
Indonesia (ASIRI)	1
Ireland (IRMA)	1
Israel International Airplay (Media Forest)	1
Italy (FIMI)	1
Japan Hot 100 (Billboard)	4
Latvia Streaming (LaIPA)	22
Lebanon (Lebanese Top 20)	2
Luxembourg Digital Song Sales (Billboard)	1
Malaysia (RIM)	1
Malta Airplay (Radiomonitor)	1
Mexico Airplay (Billboard)	2
Mexico Streaming (AMPROFON)	2
Netherlands (Dutch Top 40)	1
Netherlands (Mega Top 50)	1
Netherlands (Single Top 100)	1
New Zealand (Recorded Music NZ)	1
Nicaragua Anglo Airplay (Monitor Latino)	9
North Macedonia Airplay (Radiomonitor)	1
Norway (VG-lista)	1
Panama Airplay (Monitor Latino)	2
Paraguay Airplay (Monitor Latino)	2
Peru Airplay (Monitor Latino)	2
Philippines (Philippine Hot 100)	1
Poland Airplay (ZPAV)	1
Poland Dance (ZPAV)	1
Portugal (AFP)	1
Romania (Airplay 100)	1
Russia Airplay (TopHit)	1
Scottish Singles Sales (Official Charts)	1
Serbia Airplay (Radiomonitor)	1
Singapore (RIAS)	23
Slovakia Airplay (ČNS IFPI)	1
Slovakia Singles Digital (ČNS IFPI)	1
Slovenia Airplay (SloTop50)	1
South Korea (Gaon)	7
Spain (Promusicae)	2
Sweden (Sverigetopplistan)	1
Switzerland (Schweizer Hitparade)	1
Thailand (TECA)	1
Turkey International Airplay (MusicTopTR)	1
Ukraine Airplay (TopHit)	1
UK Singles (Official Charts)	1
Uruguay Airplay (Monitor Latino)	9
US Billboard Hot 100	1
US Adult Contemporary (Billboard)	1
US Adult Pop Airplay (Billboard)	1
US Dance Club Songs (Billboard)	1
US Dance Airplay (Billboard)	1
US Latin Pop Airplay (Billboard)	15
US Pop Airplay (Billboard)	1
US R&B/Hip-Hop Airplay (Billboard)	42
US Rhythmic Airplay (Billboard)	3
Venezuela Airplay (National-Report)	28
Vietnam (IFPI)	2

2021 weekly chart performance
Chart (2021)	Peak position
Global 200 (Billboard)	55

2024–2026 weekly chart performance
Chart (2024–2026)	Peak position
Belarus Airplay (TopHit)	110
CIS Airplay (TopHit)	90
Estonia Airplay (TopHit)	165
Kazakhstan Airplay (TopHit)	47
Lithuania Airplay (TopHit)	65
Moldova Airplay (TopHit)	117
Russia Airplay (TopHit)	156
Ukraine Airplay (TopHit)	95
Vietnam Hot 100 (Billboard)	65

=== Monthly charts ===
2017 monthly chart performance
Chart (2017)	Peak position
Argentina (CAPIF)	2
Brazil Streaming (Pro-Música Brasil)	19
CIS Airplay (TopHit)	1
Russia Airplay (TopHit)	1
South Korea (Gaon)	8
Ukraine Airplay (TopHit)	1

2023 monthly chart performance
Chart (2023)	Peak position
Kazakhstan Airplay (TopHit)	79

=== Year-end charts ===
Year-end chart performance
Chart (2017)	Position
Argentina (CAPIF)	3
Australia (ARIA)	1
Austria (Ö3 Austria Top 40)	2
Belgium (Ultratop 50 Flanders)	1
Belgium (Ultratop 50 Wallonia)	1
Bolivia (Monitor Latino)	19
Brazil (Pro-Música Brasil)	1
Brazil Airplay (Crowley)	65
Bulgaria International (PROPHON)	1
Canada (Canadian Hot 100)	1
CIS Airplay (TopHit)	1
Costa Rica (Monitor Latino)	22
Croatia International Airplay (Top lista)	1
Denmark (Tracklisten)	1
El Salvador (Monitor Latino)	34
France (SNEP)	1
Germany (Official German Charts)	1
Guatemala (Monitor Latino)	4
Honduras (Monitor Latino)	48
Hungary (Dance Top 40)	4
Hungary (Rádiós Top 40)	1
Hungary (Single Top 40)	3
Hungary (Stream Top 40)	1
Iceland (Tónlistinn)	1
Israel (Media Forest)	1
Italy (FIMI)	2
Japan (Japan Hot 100)	2
Latvia Airplay (LaIPA)	1
Latvia Streaming (LaIPA)	1
Malaysia (RIM)	1
Mexico (AMPROFON)	4
Netherlands (Dutch Top 40)	1
Netherlands (Single Top 100)	1
Nicaragua (Monitor Latino)	60
Norway (VG Lista)	2
New Zealand (Recorded Music NZ)	1
Panama (Monitor Latino)	8
Peru (UNIMPRO)	16
Poland (Polish Airplay Top 100)	1
Portugal (AFP)	2
Romania (Airplay 100)	1
Russia Airplay (TopHit)	1
Slovenia (SloTop50)	1
South Korea (Gaon)	4
Spain (PROMUSICAE)	2
Sweden (Sverigetopplistan)	1
Switzerland (Schweizer Hitparade)	1
Ukraine Airplay (TopHit)	1
UK Singles (OCC)	1
Uruguay (Monitor Latino)	20
US Billboard Hot 100	1
US Radio Songs (Billboard)	1
US Adult Contemporary (Billboard)	2
US Adult Top 40 (Billboard)	1
US Dance Club Songs (Billboard)	1
US Dance/Mix Show Airplay (Billboard)	1
US Mainstream Top 40 (Billboard)	1
US Rhythmic (Billboard)	17
Worldwide (IFPI)	1

Chart (2018)	Position
Australia (ARIA)	25
Belgium (Ultratop Flanders)	41
Belgium (Ultratop Wallonia)	37
Brazil (Pro-Música Brasil)	34
Canada (Canadian Hot 100)	39
CIS Airplay (TopHit)	53
Croatia International Airplay (Top lista)	36
Denmark (Tracklisten)	23
Estonia (Eesti Tipp-40)	50
France (SNEP)	15
Germany (Official German Charts)	34
Hungary (Dance Top 40)	12
Hungary (Rádiós Top 40)	10
Hungary (Single Top 40)	21
Hungary (Stream Top 40)	40
Iceland (Tónlistinn)	32
Ireland (IRMA)	34
Italy (FIMI)	60
Japan (Japan Hot 100)	14
Netherlands (Single Top 100)	45
New Zealand (Recorded Music NZ)	20
Panama (Monitor Latino)	33
Portugal (AFP)	24
Russia Airplay (TopHit)	87
Slovenia (SloTop50)	25
South Korea (Gaon)	29
Spain (PROMUSICAE)	53
Sweden (Sverigetopplistan)	22
Switzerland (Schweizer Hitparade)	13
Ukraine Airplay (TopHit)	56
UK Singles (OCC)	31
US Billboard Hot 100	71
US Radio Songs (Billboard)	51
US Adult Contemporary (Billboard)	15
Worldwide (IFPI)	3

Chart (2019)	Position
Australia (ARIA)	75
CIS Airplay (TopHit)	158
Denmark (Tracklisten)	84
France (SNEP)	66
Iceland (Tónlistinn)	61
Japan (Japan Hot 100)	27
Portugal (AFP)	100
Slovenia (SloTop50)	44
South Korea (Gaon)	108
UK Singles (OCC)	76
Ukraine Airplay (TopHit)	68

Chart (2020)	Position
France (SNEP)	150
Japan (Japan Hot 100)	64
Panama (Monitor Latino)	95
Portugal (AFP)	173
South Korea (Gaon)	148
Ukraine Airplay (TopHit)	186

Chart (2021)	Position
Australia (ARIA)	91
CIS Airplay (TopHit)	181
France (SNEP)	186
Global 200 (Billboard)	44
Portugal (AFP)	161
South Korea (Gaon)	168
UK Singles (OCC)	71

Chart (2022)	Position
Australia (ARIA)	74
CIS Airplay (TopHit)	171
Global 200 (Billboard)	48
Hungary (Rádiós Top 40)	42
UK Singles (OCC)	67
Ukraine Airplay (TopHit)	131

Chart (2023)	Position
Australia (ARIA)	94
Belarus Airplay (TopHit)	165
CIS Airplay (TopHit)	127
Global 200 (Billboard)	65
Hungary (Rádiós Top 40)	55
Kazakhstan Airplay (TopHit)	92
Romania Airplay (TopHit)	128
South Korea (Circle)	177
Ukraine Airplay (TopHit)	162

Chart (2024)	Position
Belarus Airplay (TopHit)	181
CIS Airplay (TopHit)	131
Global 200 (Billboard)	89
Kazakhstan Airplay (TopHit)	149
Romania Airplay (TopHit)	141
South Korea (Circle)	161
Ukraine Airplay (TopHit)	165

Year-end chart performance
Chart (2025)	Position
Argentina Anglo Airplay (Monitor Latino)	50
CIS Airplay (TopHit)	135
Global 200 (Billboard)	59
South Korea (Circle)	165

=== Decade-end charts ===
Decade-end chart performance
Chart (2010–2019)	Position
Australia (ARIA)	1
Germany (Official German Charts)	1
Netherlands (Single Top 100)	6
Norway (VG-lista)	3
UK Singles (OCC)	1
US Billboard Hot 100	3
US Mainstream Top 40 (Billboard)	1

=== All-time charts ===
Chart (1958–2021)	Position
US Billboard Hot 100	10
Chart (2008–2022)	Position
Japan (Japan Hot 100)	18

== Certifications and sales ==
Certifications and sales
Region	Certification	Certified units/sales
Australia (ARIA)	17× Platinum	1,190,000^{‡}
Austria (IFPI Austria)	6× Platinum	180,000^{‡}
Belgium (BRMA)	7× Platinum	140,000^{‡}
Canada (Music Canada)	2× Diamond	1,600,000^{‡}
Denmark (IFPI Danmark)	9× Platinum	810,000^{‡}
France (SNEP)	Diamond	233,333^{‡}
Germany (BVMI)	6× Platinum	2,400,000^{‡}
Italy (FIMI)	Diamond	500,000^{‡}
Japan (RIAJ)	Platinum	250,000^{*}
Netherlands (NVPI)	2× Platinum	80,000^{‡}
New Zealand (RMNZ)	14× Platinum	420,000^{‡}
Poland (ZPAV)	5× Diamond	1,250,000^{‡}
Portugal (AFP)	8× Platinum	80,000^{‡}
South Korea (KMCA)	2× Platinum	5,000,000
Spain (Promusicae)	11× Platinum	440,000^{‡}
Sweden (GLF)	9× Platinum	360,000^{‡}
Switzerland (IFPI Switzerland)	9× Platinum	180,000^{‡}
United Kingdom (BPI)	11× Platinum	6,637,792
United States (RIAA)	13× Platinum	13,000,000^{‡}
Worldwide	—	41,500,000
Streaming
Chile (PROFOVI)	Platinum	8,000,000
Japan (RIAJ)	3× Platinum	300,000,000^{†}
South Korea (KMCA)	Platinum	100,000,000
^{*} Sales figures based on certification alone.^{‡} Sales+streaming figures based on certification alone.^{†} Streaming-only figures based on certification alone.

== Release history ==
Release dates and formats
Region	Date	Format	Version	Label	Ref(s)
Italy	6 January 2017	Contemporary hit radio	Original	Warner	
United States	10 January 2017	Contemporary hit radio	Original	Atlantic	
United Kingdom	10 February 2017	Digital download	Galantis Remix and Acoustic	Asylum	
United Kingdom	24 February 2017	Digital download	Stormzy Remix and Major Lazer Remix	Asylum	
Germany	24 February 2017	CD single	Original	Asylum	
United Kingdom	17 March 2017	Digital download	Latin Remix	Asylum	
Various	11 August 2017	Digital download	Yxng Bane Remix	Asylum	
Various	1 September 2017	Digital download	NOTD Remix	Asylum	

== See also ==
- List of best-selling singles
- List of best-selling singles by country
- List of best-selling singles in Australia
- List of best-selling singles in Belgium
- List of best-selling singles in Germany
- List of best-selling singles in Spain
- List of best-selling singles in the United States
- List of highest-certified digital singles in the United States
