= Devil's Gun =

Single by C. J. & Company

from the album Devil's Gun
- B-side: "Free to Be Me"
- Released: 1977
- Genre: Disco
- Length: 3:17 (7" version); 7:14 (Album version)
- Label: Westbound
- Songwriters: Barry Green, Ron Roker, Gerry Shury
- Producers: Mike Theodore, Dennis Coffey

C. J. & Company singles chronology
"Day Dreamer" (1975)	"Devil's Gun" (1977)	"We Got Our Own Thing" (1977)

"Devil's Gun" is a 1977 song by C. J. & Company from the album of the same name. "Devil's Gun" was written by Barry Green (also known as Barry Blue), Ron Roker, and Gerry Shury and produced by Mike Theodore and Dennis Coffey.

Along with the tracks "We Got Our Own Thing" and "Sure Can't Go to the Moon", the song went to number one for five weeks on the Billboard disco/dance chart. The single also peaked at #2 on the R&B chart. and at #36 on the Billboard Hot 100. The song's longevity had it barely cut the 1977 year-end chart despite its low peak position, at #100. The song would remain the lowest peaked song to appear in the year end for 25 years (Until “Uh Huh” by B2K broke that record), and even unmatched for 20 years.

== Chart performance ==
Chart (1977)	Peak position
UK Singles (The Official Charts Company)	43
US Billboard Hot 100	36
US Billboard National Disco Action Top 40	1
US Billboard Hot Soul Singles	2

== Popular culture ==
- The song is notable for being the first record played at the opening of Studio 54 on April 26, 1977, by DJ Richie Kaczor.
- The instrumental portions of "Devil's Gun" were featured prominently in the International version of Crocodile.
- It was also featured in the documentary The Real Bruce Lee.
- In 2016 the song was rediscovered due to its inclusion in The Get Down soundtrack.
- In 2017 it was featured in the film "BORG Vs McENROE" on General release in the UK and Europe and due out in 2018 in the USA.
- Devil's Gun is the fight song of the Mississippi Valley State Delta Devils and Devilettes athletic teams of Mississippi Valley State University, an HBCU in Itta Bena, Mississippi.
- The song's latest inclusion will be in the documentary being made of "Studio 54" due soon.

== See also ==
- List of number-one dance singles of 1977 (U.S.)
