= Devil's Gun (album) =

Studio album by C. J. & Company
- Released: 1977
- Recorded: PAC 3 Recording Company (Dearborn, Michigan); Hollywood Sound Recorders (Hollywood, California)
- Genres: Soul, disco
- Label: Westbound
- Producers: Mike Theodore, Dennis Coffey

C. J. & Company chronology
Devil's Gun (1977)	Deadeye Dick (1978)

Singles from Devil's Gun
- 1. "Devil's Gun" Released: May 1977

Professional ratings
Review scores
Source	Rating
AllMusic	4/5 stars

Devil's Gun is the debut studio album recorded by American disco group C. J. & Company, released in 1977 on the Westbound label.

== Chart performance ==
The album peaked at No. 12 on the R&B albums chart. It also reached No. 60 on the Billboard 200. The album features the title track, which peaked at No. 2 on the Hot Soul Singles chart and No. 36 on the Billboard Hot 100, and "We Got Our Own Thing", which charted at No. 93 on the Hot Soul Singles chart. Both tracks, along with the track "Sure Can't Go to the Moon", peaked at No. 1 on the Hot Dance/Disco chart.

== Track listing ==
All tracks are written by Connie Durden, Charles Clark, Cornelius Brown, Jr., Joni Tolbert, Mike Theodore, Curtis Durden, Dennis Coffey, except where noted.

Side one
No.	Title	Writer(s)	Length
1.	"Devil's Gun"	Barry Green, Ron Roker, Gerry Shury	7:14
2.	"We Got Our Own Thing"		9:30

Side two
No.	Title	Length
3.	"Free to Be Me"	5:03
4.	"Get a Groove in Order to Move"	5:11
5.	"Sure Can't Go to the Moon"	7:30

== Personnel ==
C.J. & Company

- Cornelius Brown, Jr.
- Joni Tolbert
- Connie Durden
- Curtis Durden
- Charles Clark

Additional Musicians/Personnel

- Uriel Jones, Tiki Fulwood – drums
- Rudy Robinson, Earl Van Dyke – piano
- Greg Coles, Roderick Chandler – bass
- Bruce Nazarian, Robert White – guitar
- Dennis Coffey – guitar solo
- Larry Nozero – flute solo
- Gary Schunk – moog synthesizer solo
- Mike Theodore – horns and strings arrangement

== Charts ==
Chart (1977)	Peak
U.S. Billboard Top LPs	60
U.S. Billboard Top Soul LPs	12

Singles

Year	Single	Peaks		
Year	Single	US	US R&B	US Dan
1977	"Devil's Gun"	36	2	1
1977	"We Got Our Own Thing"	—	93	1
1977	"Sure Can't Go to the Moon"	—	—	1
