= Shallow (Lady Gaga and Bradley Cooper song) =

2018 single by Lady Gaga and Bradley Cooper

Single by Lady Gaga and Bradley Cooper

from the album A Star Is Born
- Released: September 27, 2018
- Recorded: 2017
- Studio: EastWest, The Village West (Los Angeles)
- Venue: Greek Theater (Los Angeles)
- Genre: Rock; folk-pop; country; soft rock
- Length: 3:37
- Label: Interscope
- Songwriters: Lady Gaga; Mark Ronson; Anthony Rossomando; Andrew Wyatt
- Producers: Lady Gaga; Benjamin Rice

Lady Gaga singles chronology
"Joanne" (2017)	"Shallow" (2018)	"Always Remember Us This Way" (2019)

Bradley Cooper singles chronology
"Shallow" (2018)	"I'll Never Love Again" (2019)

Music video
- "Shallow" on YouTube

"Shallow" is a song performed by American singer Lady Gaga and American actor and filmmaker Bradley Cooper. It was released through Interscope Records on September 27, 2018, as the lead single from the soundtrack to the 2018 musical romantic drama film A Star Is Born. "Shallow" was written by Gaga with Mark Ronson, Anthony Rossomando and Andrew Wyatt, and produced by Gaga with Benjamin Rice. The song is heard three times in the film, most prominently during a sequence when Cooper's character Jackson Maine invites Gaga's character Ally to perform it onstage with him. The scene was filmed in front of a live audience at the Greek Theater in Los Angeles.

"Shallow" is a pivotal moment in A Star Is Born, since it speaks about Ally and Jackson's conversations. Gaga wrote it from Ally's point of view with the self-aware lyrics asking each other if they are content being who they are. It is a power ballad that blends rock, country and folk-pop, finding Gaga and Cooper trading verses and gradually moves towards the climactic final chorus with a vocal run by Gaga. The recording is interspersed with the sound of audience noise and applause. Gaga premiered it on DJ Zane Lowe's Beats 1 radio show while giving an interview about the film. An accompanying music video was also released, showing both Gaga's and Cooper's characters singing "Shallow" together onstage, interspersed with scenes from A Star Is Born.

"Shallow" received universal acclaim from music critics, who commended Gaga's vocals, the dramatic composition and the songwriting. Commercially, the song topped the charts in more than twenty countries, and earned a double diamond certification in Poland as well as diamond certifications in Australia, Brazil, France, and New Zealand. It also became the best-selling song of the 2019 calendar year in Croatia, Hungary, and Switzerland, and sold 10.2 million copies that year globally. The song won numerous accolades, including the Academy Award for Best Original Song, the BAFTA Award for Best Film Music, the Golden Globe Award for Best Original Song and the Critics' Choice Movie Award for Best Song. Nominated for Record of the Year and Song of the Year at the 61st Annual Grammy Awards, it won for Best Pop Duo/Group Performance and Best Song Written for Visual Media. It is one of the most streamed songs on Spotify, one of the best selling singles of all time, and is widely considered to be one of the best film songs of all time. Gaga has performed "Shallow" live at her concerts and award ceremonies, including the 91st Academy Awards, where Cooper accompanied her.

== Background and release ==
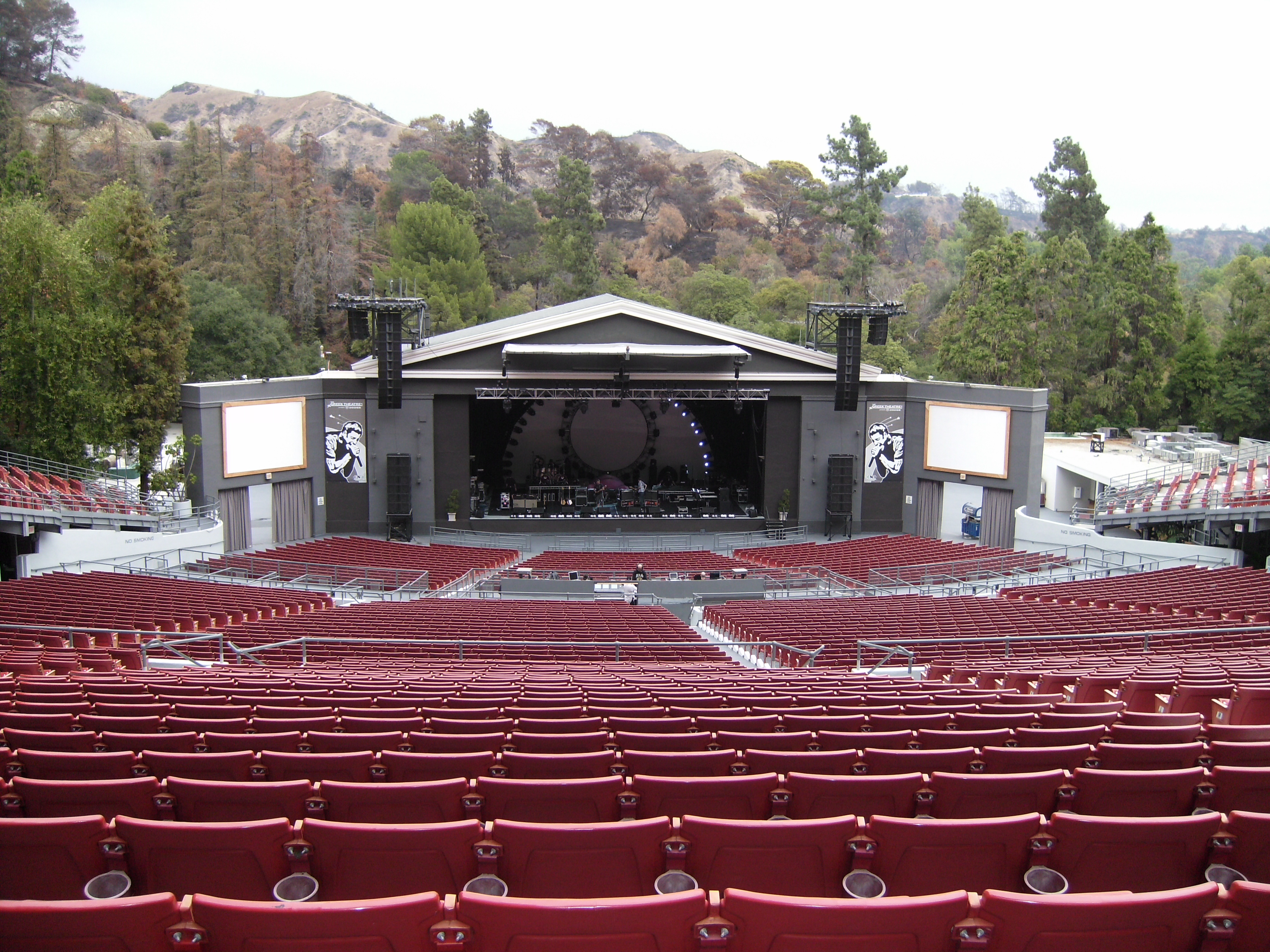
The Greek Theater, Los Angeles where Gaga and Cooper recorded and filmed the sequence for "Shallow"

Gaga collaborated with Mark Ronson, with whom she had produced her fifth studio album, Joanne (2016), to develop the soundtrack for this version of the film A Star Is Born. Joanne contains country rock tracks and "twangier" ballads like "Million Reasons" and the title track, which influenced the songs in A Star Is Born. In the film, after meeting Gaga's character Ally, Bradley Cooper's character Jackson Maine talks to her about their music and dreams. Ally confesses she has written a song and sings it briefly for Jackson. Its lyrics become the basis of "Shallow", the full version of which is used in a sequence when Jackson strides onto the stage at the Greek Theater in Los Angeles and sings the opening verses. He had invited Ally to come to his show and told her he would be debuting the song and had rearranged it to sing at the concert.

Before the second verse Ally musters up the courage to go onstage to sing "Shallow", including belting the loud chorus to the large audience. Their performance goes viral and launches her music career. The track becomes a staple of her concerts. The song is used briefly for a third time when she sings it at The Forum. To film the "Shallow" sequence, Cooper filled the Greek Theater with around 2,000 Gaga fans and then recorded the song. Following the filming, Gaga entertained the crowd playing piano versions of her old songs; Lukas Nelson and Promise of the Real also sang at the venue.

"Shallow" was first heard during a teaser trailer for A Star Is Born in June 2018, where it appeared around the 1:46 mark with Gaga starting to belt the final chorus. The sequence was immediately made into many Internet memes. One week before the film's release, Interscope confirmed that "Shallow" would be released as the first single from the soundtrack on September 27, 2018. Gaga premiered it on Zane Lowe's Beats 1 radio show while being interviewed about the film. An accompanying music video was released showing Gaga and Cooper's in-movie characters singing "Shallow" onstage, interspersed with various scenes from A Star Is Born. The song was released as a digital download to the iTunes Store, YouTube and Spotify. BBC Radio 2 playlisted the track on October 13, 2018. In the United States, "Shallow" was sent to hot adult contemporary radio on October 15, 2018, and the next day it was added to contemporary hit radio panels.

== Writing and recording ==
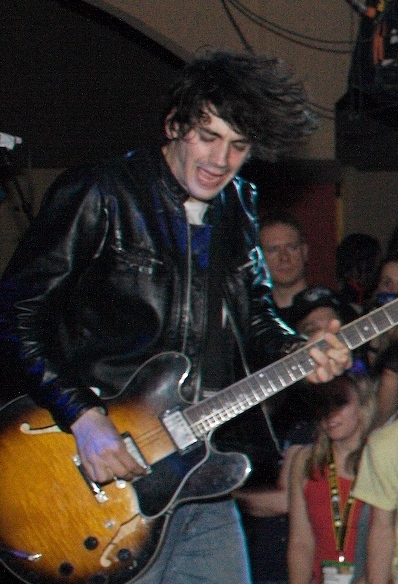
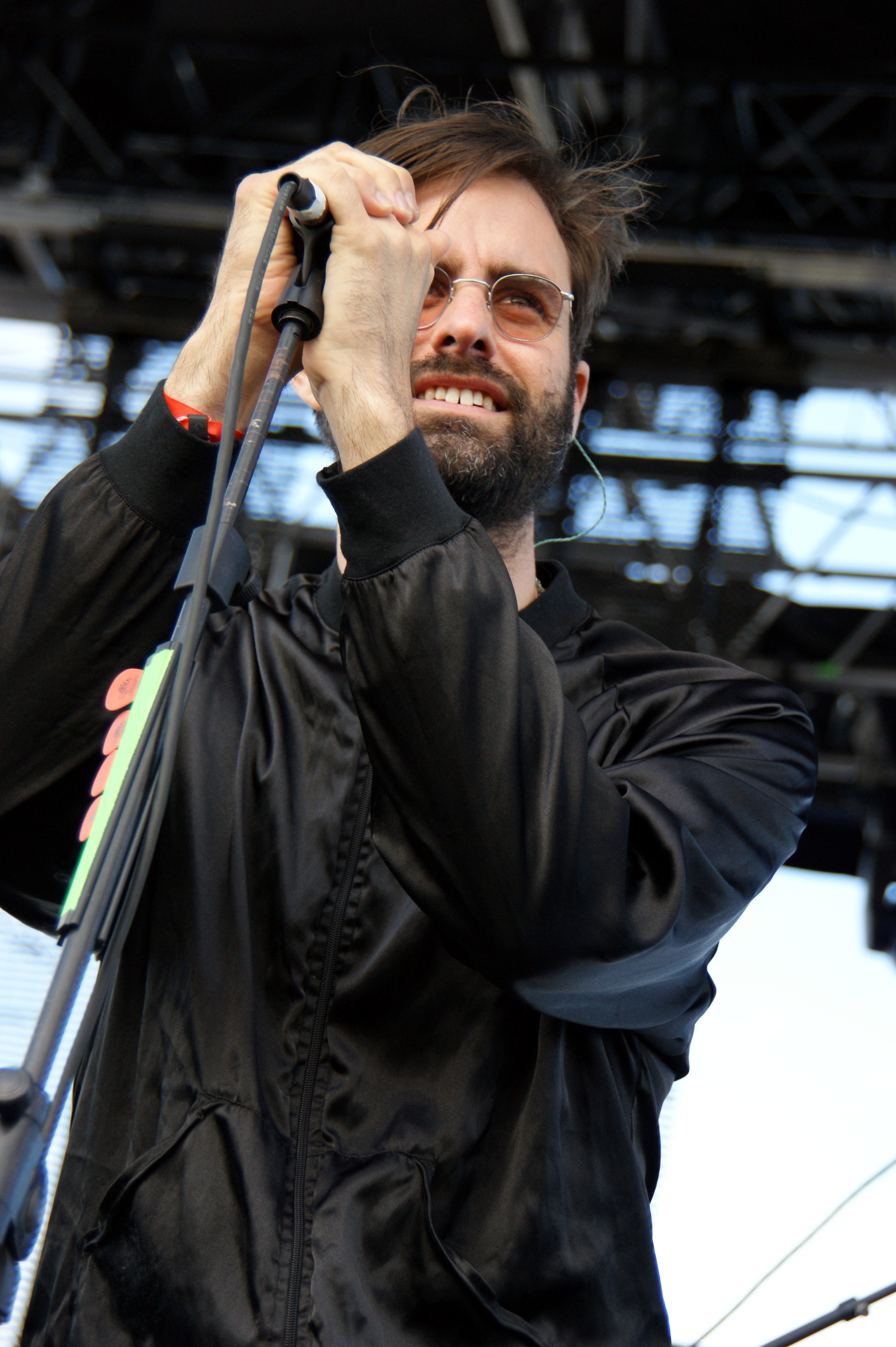
Anthony Rossomando (left) and Andrew Wyatt (right) co-wrote "Shallow" with Gaga and Ronson.

"Shallow" was written by Gaga, Ronson, Dirty Pretty Things' Anthony Rossomando and Miike Snow's Andrew Wyatt. She had played the melody to her collaborators two years earlier in a recording studio in Malibu. When Lukas Nelson came on board during the soundtrack's development, the track's sound evolved. Nelson used his own band, Promise of the Real, as Jackson's band. Inspired by Eric Clapton, he added a short acoustic guitar intro at the beginning of "Shallow", feeling it would contrast with Gaga's loud belting which follows later in the song. Gaga went to EastWest Studios to help Nelson with the track and direct the band. He recalled that with some of the instrumentation, like the cymbal crashes, they "did that live in the studio based on the vision that we had". As well as producing the track with Gaga, Benjamin Rice recorded it at EastWest and The Village West studios in Los Angeles, assisted by Bo Bodnar and Alex Williams. Tom Elmhirst mixed the song at Electric Lady Studios in New York City. It was engineered by Brandon Bost and mastered by Randy Merrill at Sterling Sound Studios. Ronson also re-recorded a 1980s version of "Shallow", accompanied by big drums; it was used in the film during a sequence when Ally plays at The Forum, while Jackson kills himself.

Gaga described "Shallow" as a pivotal moment in A Star Is Born, since it spoke about Ally and Jackson's conversations and their "need and drive" to go deep and move away from the shallow area in their relationship, an interpretation recognized by critics. The singer explained on Beats 1 they wrote the track from the point of view of Ally and how it became part of the reason they fall in love. "When I was writing music for the film I had to think about Ally as if she wasn't me. I went with a sound for her, even in the pop realm, that's unlike anything I've ever put out before," she clarified. The songwriting sessions included Gaga at the piano and Ronson, Wyatt and Rossomando on guitar as they tried to come up with the verses. Ronson explained the original draft of the script had Jackson dying by drowning, which led Gaga to write the lyrics, "I'm off the deep end watch as I dive in". Initially, "Shallow" was an end credits song, but when the script changed it became a love song about Jackson and Ally. Seeing the first trailer for the film, Ronson decided not to refine the track anymore and kept it as the final mix. For Gaga, the conversational nature of the lyrics helped to set up Shallow's aria, which she recorded with a falsetto voice. She also came up with the play on the song title "Shallow", "In the sha-ha, sha-ha-ha-low" lyrics.

== Composition and lyrical interpretation ==
"Shallow"
A 23-second sample of "Shallow", featuring Gaga's vocal run before the final chorus.

A slow-burning rock, folk-pop and country power ballad, "Shallow" features mainly Nelson's acoustic guitar with Cooper and Gaga trading verses. The other musicians include Jesse Siebenberg on the lap steel guitar; Anthony Logerfo on drums; Corey McCormick on bass; Alberto Bof on keyboards; and Eduardo 'Tato' Melgar performing percussion. The recording is interspersed with the sound of audience noise and applause.

Cooper opens the first verse by singing "Tell me something, girl" in a restrained voice; Gaga joins from the second verse, belting with what is described by Pitchfork as a "sturdy voice". As the song moves gradually towards the final chorus the final vocal run has been described by Jon Blistein of Rolling Stone as "chilling" with "impressive harmonizing" from both artists, accompanied by drums and pedal steel guitar. Gaga sings a "roaring" vocal, harmonizing on the run "Haaa-ah-ah-ah, haaawaah, ha-ah-ah-aaah". This ends by moving into the final chorus as she sings the lines: "I'm off the deep end / Watch as I dive in / I'll never meet the ground / Crash through the surface / Where they can't hurt us / We're far from the shallow now".

An article in The Guardian, notes that "Shallow" depicts the protagonists' self-realization of their current situation and speaks "for those, to whom life has not always been fair or kind". For Gaga, it's the connection and the dialogue established between Jackson and Ally, which made "Shallow" impactful. Ronson believed that working with Gaga on Joanne allowed the singer to delve into a more personal songwriting with "Shallow". The lyrics have both characters asking each other if they are satisfied being who they are. They demonstrate self-awareness, portraying "the gains and pains of stardom", and those of addiction in the lines, "In all the good times, I find myself longing for change, And in the bad times, I fear myself". The songwriters claim the drowning metaphor in the lyrics could be literal as well as about heartache, addiction or dreams shattering.

=== Copyright claim ===
In August 2019, singer-songwriter Steve Ronsen accused Gaga of copying a three-note progression (G–A–B) from his 2012 song "Almost" for the hook of "Shallow". Ronsen and his lawyer, Mark D. Shirian, sought a multimillion-dollar settlement and threatened legal action. Gaga's lawyer, Orin Snyder, rejected the allegations, stating that musicologists consulted by her legal team had found no actionable similarities between the two songs and that the progression appeared in earlier compositions. In April 2023, NationalWorld reported that the outcome of the dispute remained unclear.

== Critical reception ==
"Shallow" received widespread critical acclaim. Nicole Engelman of Billboard described the song as a strong ballad and a "stunning duet" featuring "striking harmony" between Gaga and Cooper. Carrie Wittmer of Business Insider and Paper's Katherine Gillespie compared Cooper's vocals to those of singer-songwriter Eddie Vedder. Wittmer felt they complemented Gaga's "empowering and distinct voice". Several critics felt that "Shallow" was worthy of a nomination for the Academy Award for Best Original Song. Pitchfork's Eve Barlow commended Gaga's performance, noting the theme "may prove to be Gaga's own apex in the spotlight, her completion into superstar of charts and screen". She wrote that although Cooper did not have "the deep growl of Kris Kristofferson (who played the lead male character in the 1976 film) [he] pulls off the earnestness required to hand over [to Gaga]". Joey Morona of The Plain Dealer described it as a "mesmerizing duet" that "inspires you, then punches you in the gut before lifting you back up again," and said it is just as effective in evoking strong emotions as Adele's "Someone Like You" (2011).

"Shallow" comes at a time when more focus is being put on highlighting the hidden geniuses behind songwriters and performers, as well as achieving gender equality across the music and podcasting industry—both movements that may serve to help female artists and songwriters navigate and thrive in the entertainment industry.

— An article on Spotify discussing the importance of "Shallow" in the contemporary music climate

Ben Beaumont-Thomas of The Guardian noted how "moments before she makes the octave jump for the big chorus, [Gaga's] face flickers with terror", adding the track is "torrid yet robust, and truly outstanding". Jenny Stevens, also a Guardian reviewer, complimented the lyrics for portraying the "inevitable comedown, the isolation and the untethered moments on the road when addiction can trample over a psyche". Stevens compared Gaga's vocals to those in Fleetwood Mac songs for their "raw, guttural, powerful" delivery and the ill-fated romance it heralds. Spin's Maggie Serota felt Cooper was convincing "as a grizzled, whiskey-throated troubadour", and that the ballad "gives Lady Gaga a chance to show off her impressive pipes". Maeve McDermott of the Chicago Sun-Times praised "Shallow" for elevating A Star Is Born "from normal blockbuster fare to a masterwork of the form". She feels the "rapturous reception of [the track] was the most universally excited reaction to any Lady Gaga song in recent memory".

Jon Pareles of The New York Times rated it the "most boffo track" from the album and complimented its "exponential buildup" and Gaga's "throaty and breathy to full-scale belting". He felt "Shallow" was an immediate sequel to Gaga's "Million Reasons", but contained characteristic stuttered repeated syllables in the chorus, like her earlier songs, "Poker Face" and "Paparazzi" (both 2009). In another review, Jon Caramanica, from the same newspaper, described the song as a "good, old-fashioned, sound-of-the-1970s, gumption-of-the-1980s, high-treacle-higher-pomp roots ballad", writing that Gaga's vocal "throbs intensely here, leaning deep into the natural husk of her voice". NPR's Lars Gotrich felt "Shallow" is a "quiet, reflective country croon", describing Cooper as having "a sweet and amiable set of pipes" while Gaga as a "theater kid [...] roar[s] in at the chorus... growling the last word as if every rejection, every ex, every barrier embodies it. Beyond the shallow end of life, they embrace the deep."

Writing in Esquire magazine, Matt Miller was initially ambivalent towards the song, feeling it was just "two hooks from the trailer stitched into one song" and had a "meh" response to it. However, after watching the film he changed his opinion, saying "it mostly lives up to expectations—specifically, the first part of the movie and the build-up to when you first hear [it being performed]". In an article published by Spotify analyzing "Shallow"'s importance, the writer describes it as the film's "hero song", the first to "truly cover the topic" of the "dangers of Hollywood, fame, and stardom" themes prevalent in A Star Is Born.

== Legacy ==
From its release, "Shallow" received universal acclaim and is considered among the best songs from any movie soundtrack of all time by many critics. "Shallow" was also seen by many commentators as assertion of Gaga's status in the entertainment industry. An article from Billboard regarding the 100 best musical bridges of the 21st century featured "Shallow" at number six, stating "the Oscar and Grammy winner starts off as a sweet, yet somber back and forth between a boy and a girl. But the guttural bridge launches "Shallow" off the deep end and into iconic territory. In the film, it's the precise moment that Ally's star is born. In the real world, it further cemented Gaga's legacy."

As for the song's impact on society, in an interview with Elle, Gaga states that "I really believe in my heart that the unfortunate truth is that our cell phones are becoming reality", she said. "It's become reality for the world. And in this song we provide not just a conversation, but also a very poignant statement. I wish not to be in the shallow, but I am. I wish to dive off the deep end, but watch me do it. I think this is something that speaks to many people, and during, I think, a very shallow time, it's a chance for us all to grab hands and dive into the water together and swim into the deepest depths of the water that we can."

== Commercial performance ==
On the second week after its debut, "Shallow" topped the Digital Songs chart, selling 58,000 copies (Gaga's sixth chart-topper), and entered the Billboard Hot 100 at number 28. Following the film's release on October 5, 2018, "Shallow" rose to number five on the Hot 100 and ran for a total of 45 weeks on that chart. It also topped the Digital Songs chart for a second consecutive week, selling 71,000 copies. The song marked Gaga's fifteenth top-ten entry on the chart and Cooper's first; it became Gaga's first Top Ten since 2017 with her track "Million Reasons". Shortly after the film's Academy Awards nominations, the track moved back into the top-twenty on the Hot 100, with sales increasing by 50%. One week after the Academy Awards, the song surged to the top of the Hot 100, becoming Gaga's fourth number-one single and Cooper's first, and returned to the top of the Digital Songs chart, selling 115,000 copies. It entered the Streaming Songs chart top-ten for the first time, with 27.3 million streams. The track became Gaga's longest running Digital Songs chart topper with ten weeks in the peak position, as well as longest-running number-one song by a female lead singer.

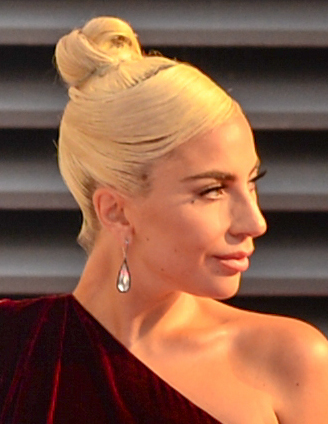
"Shallow" became Gaga's longest-running number-one song on the US Billboard Digital Songs chart, remaining atop for 10 weeks.

"Shallow" has been certified quadruple platinum by the Recording Industry Association of America (RIAA) for four million units. The song accumulated 23.3 million audience impressions debuting at number 50 on the Radio Songs chart and gradually climbed to number 10, attaining an audience of 57.4 million. It became Gaga's eighth top 10 on the Adult Pop Songs airplay chart (number two peak) becoming her fastest flight to the tier, topping the five-week climb of "Born This Way" and reached number two on the Adult Contemporary chart. "Shallow" topped the Dance Club Songs chart on December 15, 2018, aided by remixes from DJ Aron, Nesco and Lodato, among many others. It became Gaga's 15th leader on the tally, ranking her among artists with the most chart toppers.

In Canada, "Shallow" entered the Digital Songs chart at number one, becoming Gaga's fifth leader and first since "Born This Way". The song debuted at number 16 on the Canadian Hot 100. It reached the top of the charts in March 2019, becoming Gaga's fifth number-one single and Cooper's first. On the Digital charts the track remained in the pole position for 24 non-consecutive weeks, surpassing Ed Sheeran's "Perfect" (2017) as the longest-running song atop the chart at the time. In Australia, "Shallow" debuted at number 25 on the ARIA Singles Chart, before reaching number one two weeks later. It became Gaga's fourth song to reach the top, her first since "Born This Way", and Cooper's first. The track was the best-selling digital download for the week. It also reached the top of the radio airplay charts according to The Music Network. "Shallow" has since held the summit for five non-consecutive weeks. It has been certified sixteen times platinum by the Australian Recording Industry Association (ARIA). The song debuted at number 18 in New Zealand. By its second week it had climbed to number two. After two weeks, it topped the charts, becoming Gaga's third number-one song in the country.

The song entered the UK Singles Chart at number 13 with 20,425 units sold according to the Official Charts Company, and reached number six the following week. It sold another 36,952 units, becoming Gaga's 12th top-ten song in the nation. The track climbed to number four in the third week, selling 42,548 copies. It also reached the top-ten on the UK Airplay Charts, vaulting from number 62 to number eight, with total audience impressions of 48.83 million. For the week ending November 1, 2018, "Shallow" reached the top of the UK Singles Chart for two weeks becoming her fifth number one (her first since "Telephone" in 2010) and Cooper's first. The same week, A Star Is Born also returned to the top of the UK Albums Chart, giving Gaga and Cooper an Official UK Chart double, this being Gaga's third. After Gaga and Cooper's performance of the song at the 91st Academy Awards ceremony, it rose ten places to number 11 from number 21 on the UK Singles Chart for the week ending March 1, 2019. The British Phonographic Industry (BPI) awarded a sextuple platinum certification to the track for accumulating 3.6 million equivalent sales units in the UK; by February 2025, the song had sold a total of 3.6 million equivalent sales in the country with a total of 470 million streams, making it Gaga's best-performing single in the country.

Elsewhere, "Shallow" topped the charts in Ireland, Gaga's sixth number-one and Cooper's first. The song continued to top the charts and attained its highest weekly sales and streams in its third week. In Switzerland, the song debuted at number five, becoming Gaga's first top five since "Born This Way", which peaked at number one and charted 30 weeks in total inside the top 100. The next week, "Shallow" reached the summit of the charts, becoming Gaga's third number one after "Poker Face" in 2009 and "Born This Way" in 2011. The song was later certified double platinum and spent more than 200 weeks in the Swiss charts. The song was the top-selling digital download in France for the week ending October 19, 2018, reaching number 13 on the Syndicat National de l'Édition Phonographique (SNEP) Singles Chart. After four weeks, the song reached number six on the chart, before peaking at number 3 on the chart in March 2019, becoming Gaga's sixteenth and Cooper's first top ten in the country and the first for the former since "Perfect Illusion", which peaked at number one in September 2016. The SNEP awarded "Shallow" a Diamond certification for accumulating 333,333 equivalent sales units in 6 months, becoming Gaga's fastest single to be certified Diamond in the country.

In 2019 alone, the song sold 10.2 million copies worldwide (excluding the 2018 sales), according to the annual IFPI Reports. This made Gaga the first woman ever to score four singles that have sold at least 10 million copies each globally (after "Just Dance", "Poker Face", and "Bad Romance"), as well as the current record holder for the most entries by any female artist at the IFPI Global Top 10 Singles chart (after "Just Dance", "Poker Face", "Bad Romance", "Telephone" and "Born This Way").

== Accolades ==
"Shallow" was nominated and won in the category of Best Original Song – Feature Film, at the 2018 Hollywood Music in Media Awards. It also won in the category of Best Original Song at the 23rd Satellite Awards, and won in the Los Angeles Online Film Critics Society. It won the award for Best Song at the Critics' Choice Movie Awards and Best Original Song at the 76th Golden Globe Awards. At the 61st Annual Grammy Awards, the song won Best Pop Duo/Group Performance and Best Song Written for Visual Media while nominated for Record of the Year and Song of the Year. "Shallow" also won the BAFTA Award for Best Film Music at the 72nd BAFTA Awards and the Best Original Song at the 91st Academy Awards. As a result, Gaga became the first woman in history to win an Academy Award, a BAFTA Award, a Grammy Award and a Golden Globe Award in the same year.

"Shallow" is widely considered to be both one of the best songs of the 2010s decade and one of the best movie tracks of all time. Both Jon Pareles and Jon Caramanica of The New York Times ranked "Shallow" as the sixth best song of 2018. Pareles called it a "perfectly calibrated power ballad" which achieved "movie-musical triple duty as love song, vocal showcase and plot pivot". Rolling Stone listed it as the second-best song of 2018 and the 14th-best song of the 2010s; their writer, Brittany Spanos, called it a "classic-rock fantasy where the 1990s never ended".

== Live performances ==
=== 91st Academy Awards ===
External videos
- Lady Gaga, Bradley Cooper - "Shallow" (from A Star Is Born/Live from the Oscars) on YouTube

Gaga and Cooper performed "Shallow" together at the 91st Academy Awards on February 24, 2019. Cooper had confirmed that he would be singing in his own voice and not emulating that of his character in the film. The performance began with a guitarist playing the signature opening chords of the song. Gaga and Cooper stood up from the crowd and walked up to the stage hand in hand, with the camera behind the piano, facing the audience. They sat on opposite sides of a piano, maintaining constant eye contact while singing. Cooper joined Gaga at the piano for the song's final section, where they sang into a single microphone, eyes closed and faces touching. Rob Mills, senior vice president of the American Broadcasting Company, said the choreography, the camera placed facing the audience, and Cooper moving across towards Gaga during the last chorus were the duo's ideas.

Aly Semigran from Billboard called it the best musical performance of the ceremony, saying that "their chemistry on stage was just as electric as it was on the big screen". She added that "The stars' sultry looks at one another [while] sitting at the piano launched a thousand 'OMG's on Twitter. A perfect Oscar performance was born." Spencer Kornhaber of The Atlantic felt that the Oscars performance of "Shallow" was "so stunning" in part because it treated the televised awards show moment like a cinematic scene, pulling viewers into an intimate, voyeuristic space. Pitchfork's Kristen Yoonsoo Kim felt the duo "stole the show" with the "beautifully directed" performance, and described their rendition as "one birthed from a great, burning love, rather than the blossoming attraction of the film's version." Mikael Wood of the Los Angeles Times praised the vocals of both, and felt they "sang with an emotional intimacy that connected to both their characters in the movie and to the playful conspiracy theory that Gaga and Cooper are romantically involved in real life". Erica Gonzales of Harper's Bazaar found it to be "the most intimate performance the Oscars has ever seen". Vulture's Jen Chaney found the performance "both epic and intimate", where Gaga "nailed every climactic note". The Independent's Alexandra Pollard was less impressed, and criticized Cooper for singing off key, while adding that Gaga also had "a few wobbly moments", but "brought it back with a vengeance for the song's climax".

In a 2025 ranking of the best musical performances at the Oscars, USA Today ranked Gaga and Cooper's duet number one, writing that the duo, "who shared undeniable harmony in A Star is Born, seamlessy transferred that connection to a live audience in a cleverly staged performance that gripped your soul." Gaga and Cooper's live performance of "Shallow" remains the most watched clip on the internet by the Academy Awards, garnering more than 900 million views on YouTube as of 2026.

=== Other performances ===
"Shallow" has been included in several of Gaga's other live performances. It debuted at her Las Vegas residency show, Enigma (2018–2020), where she performed the song on the piano as the encore, while wearing an oversized shirt of her own merchandise. On January 26, 2019, Cooper joined her onstage, marking the first time the duo had performed the song together live. At the 61st Annual Grammy Awards on February 10, 2019, Gaga was joined onstage by Ronson, Rossomando and Wyatt, while Cooper was attending the 72nd British Academy Film Awards in London. Gaga wore a sparkling skin-tight bodysuit and high platform shoes, described as reminiscent of her looks from her The Fame-era. She also carried a bedazzled microphone stand. Brittany Spanos from Rolling Stone thought that Gaga and Ronson "stole the Grammy Awards show with a rocked-up performance" of "Shallow". She compared Gaga's movements on the stage to a "Ziggy Stardust-era David Bowie". According to Billboard's Tatiana Cirisano, the singer gave a "rollicking performance" of the song as she "held her own, kicking and hair-flipping her way across the stage". The performance generated a number of memes due to Gaga's continuous eye-contact with the recording camera onstage.

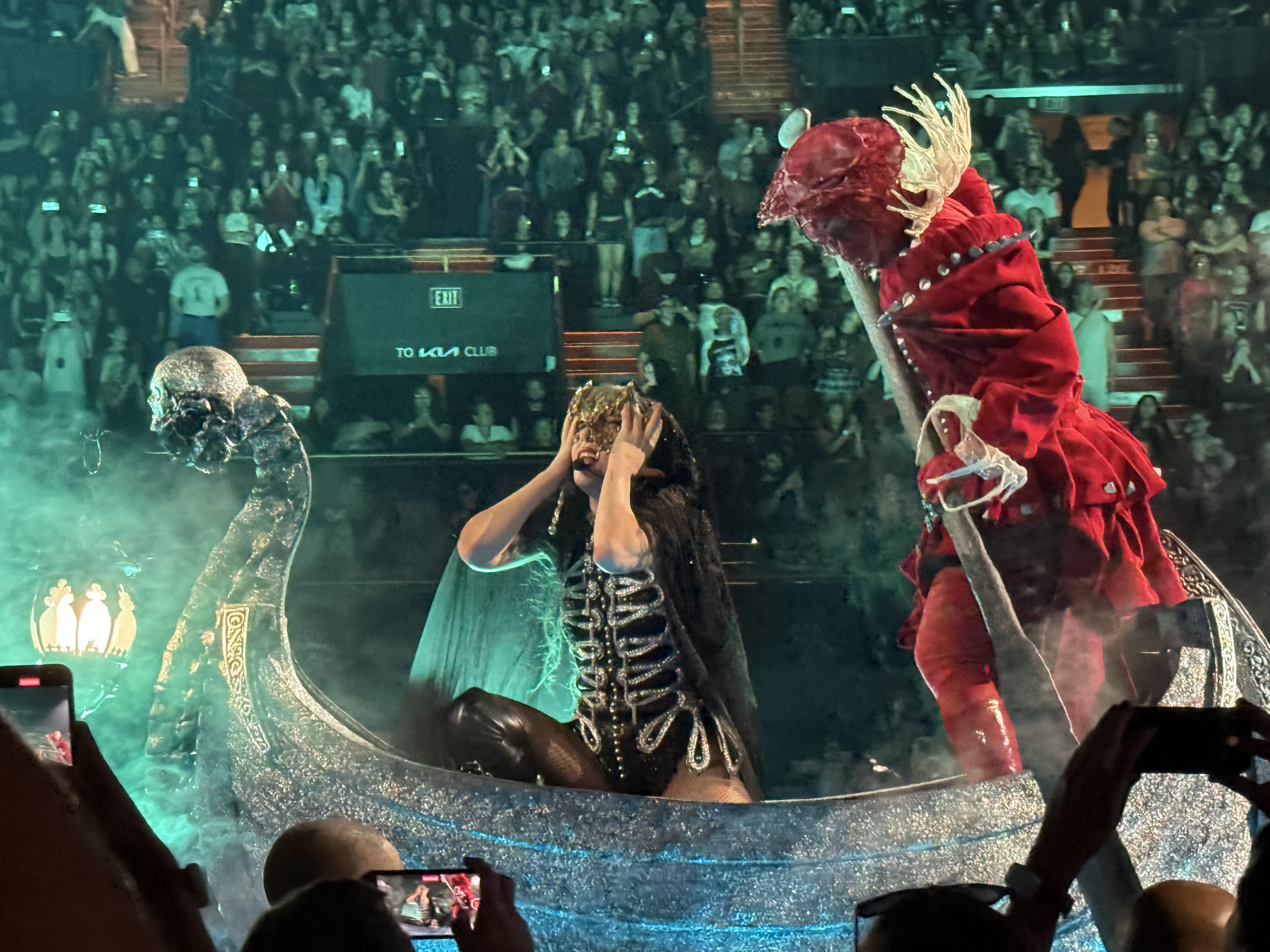
Gaga performing "Shallow" on The Mayhem Ball tour, with a visual presentation influenced by The Phantom of the Opera

On November 2, 2020, Gaga performed "Shallow" along with "You and I" at president-elect Joe Biden's final campaign rally in Pittsburgh, Pennsylvania. In 2022, she performed "Shallow" at The Chromatica Ball stadium tour wearing a praying mantis-like headpiece, while playing on a piano which was set inside a sculpture of thorns. Jed Gottlieb of the Boston Herald opined that Gaga "delivered all the tenderness 'Shallow' demands" on the tour, while Adam Davidson of Clash found it a "spine-tingling rendition". On October 25, 2023, Gaga joined U2 for a performance of "Shallow" at the band's residency in Las Vegas Valley's Sphere. On January 30, 2025, she sang it at Intuit Dome in Inglewood, California for FireAid to help with relief efforts for the January 2025 Southern California wildfires. The following month, Gaga appeared with the track at SNL50: The Homecoming Concert, which commemorated the 50th anniversary season of Saturday Night Live.

In 2025, "Shallow" was performed on piano throughout Gaga's Mayhem promotional concerts—including her Coachella headlining set—and was also featured in a five-song set at the YouTube Brandcast event at New York City's David Geffen Hall. During the Mayhem Ball tour (2025–2026), Gaga presented a darker, "more menacing" arrangement of "Shallow", appearing in a cloak and seated in a bedazzled Venetian-style gondola illuminated by a lantern. The gondola, paddled by a red-masked figure, carried her along the catwalk to the B-stage. The staging drew inspiration from Andrew Lloyd Webber's 1986 musical The Phantom of the Opera, an interpretation Webber publicly endorsed. Gaga described the new live arrangement of "Shallow" as deliberately "campy", explaining that performing it on a gondola felt "ridiculous" in a way she embraced. She said she wanted to reinterpret the song within her own aesthetic, as its original version was tied to the film's sound. To do so, she incorporated an unused electronic drum loop by Mark Ronson, adding a throbbing synth bass that gave the performance a darker mood and highlighted the more unsettling elements of Ally and Jackson's relationship. USA Today's Melissa Ruggieri felt that "Shallow" became a "gorgeous prayer" in this new rendition.

== Cover versions ==
On 14 November 2018, Scottish singer Lewis Capaldi performed "Shallow" on BBC Radio 1's Live Lounge, a rendition later included on his 2020 EP To Tell the Truth I Can't Believe We Got This Far. The following month, a performance by Irish singers Jessica Reinl and Christopher Halligan, members of the Mount Sion Choir in Waterford, went viral, attracting millions of views on Facebook. They subsequently performed the song on Irish national television.

In February 2019, Alicia Keys and James Corden performed a parody of "Shallow" on The Late Late Show with James Corden, rewriting the lyrics to reflect Keys' preparations to host the 61st Annual Grammy Awards. Comedian Melissa Villaseñor also parodied the song while impersonating Gaga on Saturday Night Live, with Rolling Stone's Ryan McGee describing her vocal performance as a "thrilling live moment". That month, Kelly Clarkson covered the song during her Meaning of Life Tour, with her rendition attracting widespread attention online. Tori Kelly and Ally Brooke subsequently performed an R&B-influenced arrangement during Kelly's concert in Los Angeles.

In May 2019, Brazilian singers Paula Fernandes and Luan Santana released a Portuguese-language adaptation titled "Juntos". Its mixed-language refrain, particularly the phrase "juntos e shallow now", became an internet meme in Brazil. The same month, Pentatonix released an a cappella rendition featuring cello accompaniment by Kevin Olusola.

In February 2020, a video of London commuter Charlotte Awbery performing "Shallow" during a spontaneous singing challenge went viral on social media. She subsequently performed the song on The Ellen DeGeneres Show and released a studio recording as her debut single on 28 August 2020. In April, Norwegian singers Carina Dahl and Åge Sten Nilsen released a Norwegian-language adaptation titled "Shallow (Så Ekte Nå)", which was certified gold by IFPI Norway in 2021. Country singers Garth Brooks and Trisha Yearwood released a duet version on Brooks' 2020 album Fun, which was subsequently promoted to country radio.

== Credits and personnel ==
Credits were adapted from the liner notes of A Star Is Born.

=== Management ===
- Published by Sony/ATV Songs LLC / SG Songs LLC (BMI) / ImageM CV / Songs of Zelig (BMI)
- Published by Stephaniesays Music (ASCAP) / Downtown DLJ Songs (ASCAP) by Downtown Music Publishing LLC, Whiteball Music Publishing Group / Downtown DMP Songs (BMI)
- Published by Warner-Barham Music LLC (BMI) / Admin by Songs of Universal (BMI) / Warner-Olive Music LLC (ASCAP)
- Recorded at Greek Theater, EastWest Studios, The Village West (Los Angeles, California)
- Mixed at Electric Lady Studios (New York City)
- Mastered at Sterling Sound Studios (New York City)

=== Personnel ===
- Lady Gaga – songwriter, producer, primary vocals
- Bradley Cooper – primary vocals
- Mark Ronson – songwriter
- Anthony Rossomando – songwriter
- Andrew Wyatt – songwriter
- Benjamin Rice – producer, recording
- Bo Bodnar – recording assistant
- Alex Williams – recording assistant
- Tom Elmhirst – mixing
- Brandon Bost – mixing engineer
- Randy Merrill – audio mastering
- Anthony Logerfo – drums
- Corey McCormick – bass
- Alberto Bof – keyboards
- Lukas Nelson – acoustic guitar
- Jesse Siebenberg – lap steel guitar
- Eduardo 'Tato' Melgar – percussion

== Charts ==
=== Weekly charts ===
Weekly chart performance
Chart (2018–2019)	Peak position
Argentina (Argentina Hot 100)	39
Australia (ARIA)	1
Austria (Ö3 Austria Top 40)	1
Belgium (Ultratop 50 Flanders)	8
Belgium (Ultratop 50 Wallonia)	2
Brazil (Crowley Charts)	41
Brazil (UBC)	2
Bolivia (Monitor Latino)	1
Canada Hot 100 (Billboard)	1
Canada AC (Billboard)	1
Canada CHR/Top 40 (Billboard)	30
Canada Hot AC (Billboard)	10
Colombia (National-Report)	68
Croatia (HRT)	1
Czech Republic Airplay (ČNS IFPI)	15
Czech Republic Singles Digital (ČNS IFPI)	1
Denmark (Tracklisten)	1
Ecuador (National-Report)	68
Estonia (IFPI)	5
Euro Digital Songs (Billboard)	1
Finland (Suomen virallinen lista)	9
France (SNEP)	3
Germany (GfK)	4
Global 200 (Billboard)	59
Greece Digital Songs (IFPI Greece)	2
Greece Digital Songs (IFPI Greece) (Radio edit)	16
Hungary (Rádiós Top 40)	28
Hungary (Single Top 40)	1
Hungary (Stream Top 40)	1
Iceland (Tónlistinn)	1
Ireland (IRMA)	1
Israel (Media Forest)	2
Italy (FIMI)	2
Japan Hot 100 (Billboard)	29
Latvia (Latvijas Radio)	1
Lebanon (Lebanese Top 20)	19
Lithuania (AGATA)	2
Luxembourg Digital Songs (Billboard)	1
Malaysia (RIM)	5
Mexico (Billboard Mexican Airplay)	10
Netherlands (Dutch Top 40)	5
Netherlands (Single Top 100)	5
New Zealand (Recorded Music NZ)	1
Norway (VG-lista)	1
Poland Airplay (ZPAV)	27
Portugal (AFP)	1
Romania (Airplay 100)	37
Scottish Singles Sales (Official Charts)	1
Singapore (RIAS)	6
Slovakia Airplay (ČNS IFPI)	1
Slovakia Singles Digital (ČNS IFPI)	1
Slovenia (SloTop50)	2
South Korea International Digital (Gaon)	25
Spain (Promusicae)	11
Sweden (Sverigetopplistan)	1
Switzerland (Schweizer Hitparade)	1
UK Singles (Official Charts)	1
Ukraine Airplay (TopHit)	127
US Billboard Hot 100	1
US Adult Contemporary (Billboard)	2
US Adult Pop Airplay (Billboard)	2
US Dance Club Songs (Billboard)	1
US Dance Airplay (Billboard)	40
US Pop Airplay (Billboard)	19
US Rolling Stone Top 100	1
Venezuela (National-Report)	17

Weekly chart performance
Chart (2025)	Peak position
Brazil Hot 100 (Billboard)	100
Singapore (RIAS)	27

=== Monthly charts ===
Monthly chart performance
Chart (2018–2019)	Peak position
Brazil Streaming (Pro-Música Brasil)	4
Paraguay (SGP)	78
South Korea International Digital (Gaon)	47

=== Year-end charts ===
Year-end chart performance
Chart (2018)	Position
Australia (ARIA)	53
Austria (Ö3 Austria Top 40)	33
Canadian Digital Songs (Billboard)	12
France (SNEP)	98
Hungary (Single Top 40)	8
Hungary (Stream Top 40)	31
Iceland (Plötutíóindi)	23
Ireland (IRMA)	27
Italy (FIMI)	99
Netherlands (Dutch Top 40)	69
Portugal (AFP)	51
Sweden (Sverigetopplistan)	29
Switzerland (Schweizer Hitparade)	22
Taiwan (Hito Radio)	4
UK Singles (OCC)	87
US Digital Songs (Billboard)	38

Year-end chart performance
Chart (2019)	Position
Australia (ARIA)	9
Austria (Ö3 Austria Top 40)	14
Belgium (Ultratop Flanders)	17
Belgium (Ultratop Wallonia)	11
Bolivia (Monitor Latino)	85
Canada (Canadian Hot 100)	6
Croatia (HRT)	1
Denmark (Tracklisten)	2
France (SNEP)	12
Germany (Official German Charts)	16
Hungary (Single Top 40)	1
Hungary (Stream Top 40)	12
Iceland (Tónlistinn)	10
Ireland (IRMA)	7
Italy (FIMI)	22
Latvia (LAIPA)	20
Netherlands (Dutch Top 40)	29
Netherlands (Single Top 100)	18
New Zealand (Recorded Music NZ)	10
Norway (VG-lista)	2
Portugal (AFP)	8
Romania (Airplay 100)	72
Slovenia (SloTop50)	18
Spain (PROMUSICAE)	40
Sweden (Sverigetopplistan)	3
Switzerland (Schweizer Hitparade)	1
Tokyo (Tokio Hot 100)	40
UK Singles (OCC)	20
US Billboard Hot 100	19
US Adult Contemporary (Billboard)	2
US Adult Top 40 (Billboard)	11
US Dance Club Songs (Billboard)	36
US Rolling Stone Top 100	19
Worldwide (IFPI)	8

Year-end chart performance
Chart (2020)	Position
Australia (ARIA)	61
Denmark (Tracklisten)	62
France (SNEP)	103
Hungary (Single Top 40)	29
Iceland (Tónlistinn)	39
Italy (FIMI)	99
Portugal (AFP)	93
Slovenia (SloTop50)	32
Sweden (Sverigetopplistan)	72
Switzerland (Schweizer Hitparade)	24
UK Singles (OCC)	65

Year-end chart performance
Chart (2021)	Position
Australia (ARIA)	69
Denmark (Tracklisten)	95
France (SNEP)	190
Global 200 (Billboard)	63
Hungary (Single Top 40)	49
Portugal (AFP)	131
Switzerland (Schweizer Hitparade)	56
UK Singles (OCC)	59

Year-end chart performance
Chart (2022)	Position
Australia (ARIA)	68
France (SNEP)	159
Global 200 (Billboard)	67
Hungary (Single Top 40)	84
Switzerland (Schweizer Hitparade)	84
UK Singles (OCC)	84

Year-end chart performance
Chart (2023)	Position
Global 200 (Billboard)	126

Year-end chart performance
Chart (2025)	Position
Netherlands (Single Top 100)	100

=== Decade-end charts ===
Decade-end chart performance
Chart (2010–2019)	Position
Australia (ARIA)	99
Norway (VG-lista)	12

=== Garth Brooks and Trisha Yearwood cover ===
==== Weekly charts ====
Weekly chart performance
Chart (2020–2021)	Peak position
US Bubbling Under Hot 100 (Billboard)	7
US Country Airplay (Billboard)	21
US Hot Country Songs (Billboard)	27

==== Year-end charts ====
Year-end chart performance
Chart (2021)	Position
US Hot Country Songs (Billboard)	61

== Certifications and sales ==
Certifications and sales for "Shallow" by Lady Gaga and Bradley Cooper
Region	Certification	Certified units/sales
Australia (ARIA)	16× Platinum	1,120,000^{‡}
Austria (IFPI Austria)	5× Platinum	150,000^{‡}
Belgium (BRMA)	3× Platinum	120,000^{‡}
Brazil (Pro-Música Brasil)	8× Diamond	1,280,000^{‡}
Canada (Music Canada)	8× Platinum	640,000^{‡}
Denmark (IFPI Danmark)	5× Platinum	450,000^{‡}
France (SNEP)	Diamond	333,333^{‡}
Germany (BVMI)	2× Platinum	1,200,000^{‡}
Italy (FIMI)	6× Platinum	600,000^{‡}
New Zealand (RMNZ)	10× Platinum	300,000^{‡}
Norway (IFPI Norway)	8× Platinum	480,000^{‡}
Poland (ZPAV)	2× Diamond	500,000^{‡}
Portugal (AFP)	6× Platinum	60,000^{‡}
Spain (Promusicae)	6× Platinum	360,000^{‡}
Switzerland (IFPI Switzerland)	2× Platinum	40,000^{‡}
United Kingdom (BPI)	6× Platinum	3,600,000^{‡}
United States (RIAA)	4× Platinum	4,000,000^{‡}
Streaming
Sweden (GLF)	8× Platinum	64,000,000^{†}
Summaries
Worldwide	—	10,200,000
^{‡} Sales+streaming figures based on certification alone.^{†} Streaming-only figures based on certification alone.

== Release history ==
Release dates and formats by Lady Gaga & Bradley Cooper
Region	Date	Format(s)	Label	Ref.
Various	September 27, 2018	Digital download; streaming	Interscope	
Italy	October 5, 2018	Radio airplay	Universal	
United States	October 15, 2018	Adult contemporary radio; hot adult contemporary radio; modern adult contemporary radio	Interscope	
United States	October 16, 2018	Contemporary hit radio	Interscope	

== See also ==
- List of best-selling singles
- List of best-selling singles by country
- List of best-selling singles in Australia
- List of best-selling singles in Belgium
- List of best-selling singles in Brazil
- List of best-selling singles in Spain
- List of most-streamed songs on Spotify
- Artists with the most number-ones on the U.S. Dance Club Songs chart
- List of Billboard Hot 100 top-ten singles in 2018
- List of Billboard Hot 100 number ones of 2019
- List of Canadian Hot 100 number-one singles of 2019
- List of number-one singles of 2018 (Australia)
- List of number-one singles of 2019 (Australia)
- List of number-one hits of 2018 (Austria)
- List of number-one hits of 2019 (Denmark)
- List of number-one singles of 2018 (Ireland)
- List of number-one singles from the 2010s (New Zealand)
- List of number-one songs in Norway
- List of number-one singles of 2018 (Portugal)
- List of number-one singles of the 2010s (Sweden)
- List of number-one hits of 2018 (Switzerland)
- List of Billboard Dance Club Songs number ones of 2018
- List of number-one digital songs of 2018 (U.S.)
- List of number-one digital songs of 2019 (U.S.)
- List of top 10 singles in 2018 (France)
- List of UK Singles Chart number ones of the 2010s
- List of UK Singles Downloads Chart number ones of the 2010s
