= C. J. & Company =

Disco group from Detroit, Michigan

C.J. & Company
- Origin: Detroit, USA
- Genres: Disco, R&B
- Years active: 1977–1979
- Members: Curtis "CJ" Durden; Connie Durden; Joni Tolbert; Charles Clark; Cornelius Brown

C.J. & Company (also C.J. & Co. or C.C. & Co.) was a disco group from Detroit, Michigan. They were the partnership of producers Dennis Coffey and Mike Theodore. Their highest charting single in the US was "Devil's Gun", which reached #36 on the Billboard pop chart, spending 29 weeks on the Hot 100. It wound up being the #100 song of 1977 on the Billboard year end chart. It peaked at #2 on the R&B chart in 1977. It also peaked at #43 on the UK Singles Chart. That song, along with "We Got Our Own Thing" (later sampled by Heavy D and the Boyz) and "Sure Can't Go to the Moon," hit #1 for five weeks on the Hot Dance Music/Club Play chart.

They released two full-length LPs, Devil's Gun (1977) and Deadeye Dick (1978) both for Westbound Records. In 1998 a compilation CD was released with full length selected tracks from both LPs.

"Devil's Gun" was the first record played at the opening of Studio 54 by DJ Richie Kaczor.

== Discography ==
=== Studio albums ===
Year	Title	Peak chart positions			Record label
Year	Title	US	US R&B	CAN	Record label
1977	Devil's Gun	60	12	67	Westbound
1978	Deadeye Dick	—	—	—	Westbound
"—" denotes a recording that did not chart or was not released in that territory.

=== Compilation albums ===
- USA Disco (1998, Westbound)

=== Singles ===
Year	Title	Peak chart positions						
Year	Title	US	US R&B	US Dan	CAN	NLD	SWE	UK
1975	"Day Dreamer" ^{[A]}	91	—	—	—	—	—	—
1977	"Devil's Gun"	36	2	1	55	17	19	43
1977	"We Got Our Own Thing"	—	93	1	—	—	—	—
1977	"Sure Can't Go to the Moon"	—	—	1	—	—	—	—
1978	"Big City Sidewalk"	106	—	18	—	—	—	—
1978	"Deadeye Dick"	—	—	18	—	—	—	—
"—" denotes a recording that did not chart or was not released in that territory.

- ^{A} Single credited to C. J. & Company

== See also ==
- List of Billboard number-one dance club songs
- List of artists who reached number one on the U.S. Dance Club Songs chart
