= Charlotte Awbery =

English singer-songwriter

- Born: 4 October 1988 (age 38)
- Origin: Romford, London, UK
- Occupation: Singer-songwriter
- Years active: 2005–present
- Label: INgrooves

Charlotte Awbery (born 4 October 1988) is an English singer-songwriter best known for her live cover of "Shallow" in a tube station that went viral on social media.

== Career ==
In 2005, Awbery began professionally singing in weddings, pubs, and restaurants. Awbery unsuccessfully auditioned for The X Factor and Britain's Got Talent. She is a cover artist and has performed music by Prince, Celine Dion, and Sia.

In 2017, she released a single and accompanying music video, "Give Up This Girl". MTV Australia described the track as "old school Alicia Keys or Whitney Houston".

In early 2020, YouTuber Kevin Freshwater posted an impromptu clip of Awbery covering "Shallow" for his segment "Finish the Lyrics". On Instagram, Awbery gained 217,000 followers within a week of the video circulating. She sang the song on The Ellen DeGeneres Show. On 28 August 2020 Awbery released her cover of "Shallow" on YouTube and later released a music video for it on September 10.

== Personal life ==
Awbery is from Romford, East London. She is supportive of the LGBT community.
