= Richie Kaczor =

American DJ (1952–1993)

- Born: Richard Paul Kaczor; December 9, 1952; Elizabeth, New Jersey, U.S.
- Died: April 9, 1993 (aged 40)
- Occupation: Dj
- Years active: 1970s–1993
- Known for: Resident DJ at Studio 54
- Notable work: Popularizing Gloria Gaynor's "I Will Survive"

Richard Paul Kaczor (December 9, 1952 – April 1993) was an American DJ whose career spanned from disco's infancy in the 1970s until his death in 1993. He was born on December 9, 1952, in Elizabeth, New Jersey.

Kaczor's DJ career began in New Jersey, where he played in several nightclubs, including One Sane Man (also known as The Alamo). In 1973, Kaczor began working at the Hollywood Discotheque in Manhattan, New York. During his four years at the nightclub, Kaczor developed skills in beat mixing. After leaving Hollywood Discotheque in 1977, Kaczor briefly played at the Second Story in Philadelphia before being approached by Steve Rubell and Ian Schrager. The duo were the owners of Studio 54, a newly established nightclub in Manhattan.

Rubell and Schrager offered Kaczor a residency at the nightclub, which he accepted. On April 26, 1977, Studio 54 opened. Nicky Siano was also a resident DJ at the nightclub. Kaczor played on weekends, and Siano played weekday nights. James Opdyke, a friend of Kaczor (who had played at the Underground and the Saint), was also hired as a fill-in during set breaks.

Kaczor was credited by fellow DJs for popularizing Gloria Gaynor's track "I Will Survive," which reached No. 1 on the Billboard Hot 100. Siano said that Kaczor was the first in the industry to acknowledge the track (originally a B-side track on Substitute").

On March 4, 1980, Kaczor and Studio 54 lighting engineer, Robert DeSilva, opened the upper-level Disco 40 in Hamilton, Bermuda.

Richard Kaczor died in April 1993 at age 40 from AIDS.
