= Heatwave's Greatest Hits =

Compilation album by Heatwave
- Released: 1984
- Recorded: 1976–1982
- Genre: Contemporary R&B, disco
- Length: 37:27
- Label: Epic
- Producer: Barry Blue, James Guthrie, Johnnie Wilder, Jr.

Heatwave chronology
Current (1982)	Heatwave's Greatest Hits (1984)	The Fire (1988)

Professional ratings
Review scores
Source	Rating
Allmusic	3/5 stars

Heatwave's Greatest Hits is a greatest hits album by Heatwave released by Epic Records in 1984. It features not all of their biggest hits, because 'Too Hot Too Handle', 'Jitterbuggin' and 'Razzle Dazzle' are missing.

== Track listing ==
All tracks are written by Rod Temperton, except where noted.

Side one
No.	Title	Length
1.	"Boogie Nights"	3:36
2.	"Always and Forever"	4:47
3.	"Lettin' It Loose"	4:19
4.	"Look After Love"	4:20
5.	"The Groove Line"	4:22

Side two
No.	Title	Writer(s)	Length
6.	"Gangsters of the Groove"		4:02
7.	"Mind Blowing Decisions"	Johnnie Wilder, Jr.	4:16
8.	"Posin' Til Closin'"		3:38
9.	"The Big Guns"		4:07
