= Candles (album) =

Studio album by Heatwave
- Released: 21 November 1980
- Recorded: 1979–1980
- Studio: Davlen Sound Studios, Los Angeles, California; Producers Workshop, Los Angeles, California; Studio 55, Los Angeles, California
- Genre: Pop, funk, disco
- Length: 41:21
- Label: GTO (UK); Epic (US)
- Producer: James Guthrie, Johnnie Wilder, Jr.

Heatwave chronology
Hot Property (1979)	Candles (1980)	Current (1982)

Singles from Candles
- 1. "Gangsters of the Groove" Released: 1980; 2. "Dreamin' You" Released: 1980 (AUS); 3. "Where Did I Go Wrong" Released: 1981 (US); 4. "Jitterbuggin'" Released: 1981 (UK); 5. "Posin' 'til Closin'" Released: 1981 (UK); 6. "Turn Around" Released: 1981 (US)

Professional ratings
Review scores
Source	Rating
AllMusic	3/5 stars

Candles is the fourth studio album by the British pop, funk, disco band Heatwave. Arranged, and primarily written by Rod Temperton, it was released on 21 November 1980 on the GTO record label in the United Kingdom, and the Epic record label (number 36873) in the United States. It was produced by lead singer Johnnie Wilder, Jr. and James Guthrie. It made number 71 on the Billboard LP and Tapes chart, dated 17 January 1981.

It was the last Heatwave album to be released on the GTO record label before it was wrapped up in late 1981.

It was also the only Heatwave album to feature James Dean "J.D." Nicholas, he left the band after the album's release in 1980 to replace Lionel Richie as a lead singer of the Commodores in 1984.

The album was remastered and reissued on compact disc (CD) with bonus tracks in 2010 by Big Break Records (CDBBR 0024).

== Track listing ==
All tracks are written by Rod Temperton, except where noted

Side one
No.	Title	Writer(s)	Length
1.	"Gangsters of the Groove"		4:23
2.	"Jitterbuggin'"		4:14
3.	"Party Suite"		4:56
4.	"Turn Around"	Linda Phillips, Johnnie Wilder, Jr.	4:56
Total length:			18:29

Side two
No.	Title	Writer(s)	Length
5.	"Posin' 'til Closin'"		5:01
6.	"All I Am"	Lynsey de Paul, Susan Sheridan	3:41
7.	"Dreamin' You"		3:58
8.	"Goin' Crazy"	Johnnie Wilder, Jr.	5:52
9.	"Where Did I Go Wrong"	Tommy Gilliard, Linda Phillips, Johnnie Wilder, Jr.	4:20
Total length:			22:52

2010 remastered reissue on compact disc (CD) bonus tracks
No.	Title	Length
10.	"Gangsters of the Groove" (single version)	4:02
11.	"Jitterbuggin'" (UK single version)	4:00
12.	"Where Did I Go Wrong" (US single version)	3:46
13.	"Posin' 'til Closin'" (UK single version)	3:40
14.	"Turn Around" (US single version)	3:59
15.	"Find Someone Like You" (B-side)	3:58
16.	"Wack That Axe" (B-side)	3:45
17.	"Gangsters of the Groove" (UK 12" remix)	5:48
18.	"Posin' 'til Closin'" (UK 12" remix)	5:09

== Personnel ==
Heatwave

- Rod Temperton – writer / composer, rhythm track arrangements, vocal arrangements
- Johnnie Wilder, Jr. – lead and backing vocals
- Keith Wilder – lead vocals
- J.D. Nicholas – lead and backing vocals
- William L. Jones – lead and rhythm guitars, backing vocals
- Calvin Duke – keyboards
- Derek Bramble – bass
- Ernest "Bilbo" Berger – drums

Additional musicians

- John Cameron – orchestral arrangements
- Sid Sharp – concertmaster
- Jerry Hey – orchestral arrangements, trumpet, flugelhorn, French horns, workshop
- Gary Grant – trumpet, flugelhorn
- Kim Hutchcroft – saxophones, flutes
- Larry Williams – saxophones, flutes, clarinet
- William Reichenbach – trombone, bass trombone
- Phil Ayling – saxophone, flutes
- Keith Harrison – vocals, keyboards
- Michael Boddicker – synthesizers
- Paulinho da Costa – percussion

== Charts ==
chart (1981)	peak positions
UK Albums Chart	29
Billboard Top LPs	71
Billboard Top Soul LPs	24

=== Singles ===
year	title	peak chart positions		
year	title	UK	US	US R&B
1980	Gangsters of the Groove	19	110	21
1981	Where Did I Go Wrong	–	–	74
1981	Jitterbuggin'	34	–	–
1981	Posin' Til Closin'	–	–	–
1981	Turn Around	–	–	–
