= Songs (Luther Vandross album) =

Studio album by Luther Vandross
- Released: September 20, 1994 (U.S.)
- Recorded: December 1993–June 1994
- Studio: Various: The Hit Factory; Right Track Recording; Sony Music Studios (New York, New York); The Record Plant (Hollywood, California); The Plant Recording Studios; (Sausalito, California); Abbey Road Studios (London, United Kingdom)
- Length: 61:00
- Label: LV; Epic
- Producer: Luther Vandross; Walter Afanasieff

Luther Vandross chronology
| Never Let Me Go (1993) | Songs (1994) | This Is Christmas (1995) |

Songs is the ninth studio album by American singer-songwriter Luther Vandross. It was released by LV Records and Epic Records on September 20, 1994, in the United States. The album, a collection of cover versions, produced the singles "Endless Love", "Always and Forever", and "Ain't No Stoppin' Us Now". According to an interview both Vandross and Mariah Carey gave in Japan following the release of their duet "Endless Love", there was mention that Carey had given advice as to what songs Vandross would cover on this album. Lionel Richie is the only artist to have two songs covered on the album.

Songs garnered generally mixed reviews from music critics. It debuted and peaked at number five on the US Billboard 200 and opened at number one on the UK Albums Chart, becoming Vandross' highest-charting project yet. The album earned Vandross four nominations at the 1995 Grammy Awards for Best Male Pop Vocal Performance for "Love the One You're With", Best Pop Collaboration with Vocals for "Endless Love", Best Male R&B Vocal Performance for "Always and Forever", and Best R&B Album.

== Critical reception ==
Professional ratings
Review scores
| Source | Rating |
|---|---|
| AllMusic | 2/5 stars |
| Billboard | (favorable) |
| Entertainment Weekly | C |
| Los Angeles Times | 1.5/4 stars |
| Music Week | 5/5 stars |
| Rolling Stone | 4/5 stars |

Michael Eric Dyson wrote in his review for Rolling Stone: "While there may be no stunning surprises on Songs, this collection, brilliant in many spots, proves that Vandross is a master of musical reinterpretation." Music & Media noted that "this covers-only album could go a long way in finally giving Vandross the same status on the continent that he enjoys in the Anglo-American markets. Apart from more obvious choices [...] he successfully tries his hand at up-tempo material [...] and strays away from the R&B realm by giving a whole new twist to Stephen Stills' "Love the One You're With." Cash Box critic M.R. Martinez felt that Songs "demonstrates the ample stylistic repertoire that the singer can wield." Alan Jones from Music Week named it "an impossibly strong selection of covers", "from an album which is likely to spin-off a string of hits, and venture well into platinum territory."

AllMusic editor Stephen Thomas Erlewine found that "the collection of personal favorites suffers from the common flaws of covers albums – it isn't consistent, it sounds slightly canned, and seems like a way to buy time between 'real' albums. Nevertheless, Vandross is a truly fine singer, which is what makes Songs worthwhile." Jeremy Helligar, writing for Entertainment Weekly, called Songs a "hodgepodge collection of 13 revamped classics sounds like a desperate attempt to secure [...] a No. 1 pop single. Vandross just might find what he’s looking for. Too bad it couldn’t be something less drippy than "Endless Love"."

== Chart performance ==
Songs debuted and peaked at number five on the US Billboard 200 in the week of October 8, 1994, becoming Vandross' highest charting album yet. It spent 37 weeks on the chart and reached both Gold and Platinum status on November 23, 1994. On March 20, 1996, Songs earned a double Platinum certification by the Recording Industry Association of America (RIAA) for domestic shipments figures in excess of 2.0 million copies. In the United Kingdom, the album debuted at number one on the UK Albums Chart on October 1, 1994. It marked Vandross' first chart-topping album there and was certified Platinum on December 1, 1994.

== Track listing ==
Songs track listing
| No. | Title | Writer(s) | Originally recorded by | Length |
|---|---|---|---|---|
| 1. | "Love the One You're With" | Stephen Stills | Stephen Stills | 5:03 |
| 2. | "Killing Me Softly" | Norman Gimbel; Charles Fox | Lori Lieberman (popularized by Roberta Flack) | 5:33 |
| 3. | "Endless Love" (duet with Mariah Carey) | Lionel Richie | Lionel Richie and Diana Ross | 4:21 |
| 4. | "Evergreen" | Barbra Streisand; Paul Williams | Barbra Streisand | 3:54 |
| 5. | "Reflections" | Holland-Dozier-Holland | Diana Ross & the Supremes | 3:21 |
| 6. | "Hello" | Richie | Lionel Richie | 4:44 |
| 7. | "Ain't No Stoppin' Us Now" | Jerry Cohen; Gene McFadden; John Whitehead | McFadden & Whitehead | 4:53 |
| 8. | "Always and Forever" | Rod Temperton | Heatwave | 4:53 |
| 9. | "Going in Circles" | Anita Poree; Jerry Peters | The Friends of Distinction | 5:12 |
| 10. | "Since You've Been Gone" | Aretha Franklin; Teddy White | Aretha Franklin | 4:15 |
| 11. | "All the Woman I Need" | Dean Pitchford; Michael Gore | Linda Clifford (popularized by Whitney Houston) as "All the Man That I Need" | 4:54 |
| 12. | "What the World Needs Now" | Burt Bacharach; Hal David | Jackie DeShannon | 5:18 |
| 13. | "The Impossible Dream (The Quest)" | Mitch Leigh; Joe Darion | Richard Kiley | 5:16 |
| Total length: | | | | 61:00 |

== Personnel ==
Performers and musicians

- Luther Vandross – lead and backing vocals, BGV arrangements (1, 7, 10)
- Walter Afanasieff – arrangements (1, 3, 4, 5, 10–13), keyboards (1, 3, 4, 6–13), synthesizers (1–4, 6, 7, 8, 10–13), Hammond B3 organ (1, 5, 8, 9, 10), bass guitar (1), drums (1), percussion (1), rhythm programming (1, 3, 4, 6–13), acoustic piano (2), Synclavier (2, 3, 4, 6, 11, 12, 13), acoustic guitar (2, 3, 4, 6, 11, 12, 13), Moog bass (3, 4, 6, 7, 8, 10–13), drum programming (3, 4, 6–13), additional programming (5), synth horns (10)
- Gary Cirimelli – digital programming, Macintosh programming, synthesizer programming
- Ren Klyce – digital programming, synthesizer programming
- Dan Shea – keyboards (2, 5, 6–10), synthesizers (2, 5, 8, 9), Moog bass (2, 5, 9), drum programming (2, 9), rhythm programming (2, 5, 9), arrangements (2, 6–9), programming (6, 8, 10)
- Dann Huff – guitar, nylon guitar solo (3)
- Michael Landau – additional guitar (2, 5, 7, 11)
- Michael Thompson – additional guitar (8)
- Stephen "Doc" Kupka – baritone saxophone (9)
- Emilio Castillo – tenor saxophone (9)
- David Mann – tenor saxophone (9)
- Lee Thornburg – trombone (9), trumpet (9), flugelhorn (9)
- Greg Adams – trumpet (9), flugelhorn (9), horn arrangements (9)
- Jeremy Lubbock – orchestra arrangements and conductor (3, 4, 6, 9, 11, 12, 13)
- Isobel Griffiths – orchestra contractor (3, 4, 6, 9, 11, 12, 13)
- London Symphony Orchestra – orchestra (3, 4, 6, 9, 11, 12, 13)
- Narada Michael Walden – original arrangements (11)
- Tawatha Agee – backing vocals (1, 2, 5, 7, 9, 10, 13)
- Johnny Britt – backing vocals (1, 7, 8, 9, 11)
- Alexandra Brown – backing vocals (1, 7, 9, 11)
- Lynn Davis – backing vocals (1, 7, 9, 11)
- Jim Gilstrap – backing vocals (1, 7, 8, 9, 11)
- Phillip Ingram – backing vocals (1, 7, 8, 9, 11)
- Paulette McWilliams – backing vocals (1, 2, 5, 7, 9, 10, 13)
- Phil Perry – backing vocals (1, 7, 8, 9, 11)
- Brenda White-King – backing vocals (1, 5)
- Lisa Fischer – backing vocals (2, 5)
- Mariah Carey – lead vocals (3)
- Robin Clark – backing vocals (7, 9, 13)
- Cindy Mizelle – backing vocals (7, 9, 10)
- Fonzi Thornton – backing vocals (7, 9)
- Claytoven Richardson – backing vocals (8)
- Cissy Houston – backing vocals (10, 13), BGV arrangements (10)
- Darlene Love – backing vocals (10)
- Phillip Ballou – backing vocals (13)
- Kevin Owens – backing vocals (13)

Technical

- Walter Afanasieff – producer
- Luther Vandross – co-producer
- Dana Jon Chappelle – engineer, recording, mixing (1, 5, 7, 8, 10, 12)
- Mick Guzauski – mixing (2, 3, 4, 6, 9, 11, 13)
- Paul Brown – vocal recording (Luther Vandross)
- Jay Healy – vocal recording (Mariah Carey)
- Hadyn Bendall – strings recording
- Kyle Bess – assistant engineer
- Gus Garces – assistant engineer
- David Gleeson – assistant engineer
- Bill Leonard – assistant engineer
- Chris Ludwinski – assistant engineer
- Kent Matcke – assistant engineer
- Gil Morales – assistant engineer
- Mike Reiter – assistant engineer
- David Reitzas – assistant engineer
- Mike Scott – assistant engineer
- Andy Smith – assistant engineer
- Bob Ludwig – mastering
- Marsha Burns – production coordinator
- Barbara Stout – production coordinator

Studios

- Mixed at The Hit Factory, Right Track Recording and Sony Music Studios (New York, NY); The Plant Studios (Sausalito, CA).
- Mastered at Gateway Mastering (Portland, ME).

== Charts ==
=== Weekly charts ===
Weekly chart performance for Songs
| Chart (1994) | Peak position |
|---|---|
| Australian Albums (ARIA) | 19 |
| Austrian Albums (Ö3 Austria) | 27 |
| Dutch Albums (Album Top 100) | 20 |
| German Albums (Offizielle Top 100) | 24 |
| New Zealand Albums (RMNZ) | 5 |
| Scottish Albums (OCC) | 17 |
| Swedish Albums (Sverigetopplistan) | 48 |
| Swiss Albums (Schweizer Hitparade) | 20 |
| UK Albums (OCC) | 1 |
| UK R&B Albums (OCC) | 1 |
| US Billboard 200 | 5 |
| US Top R&B/Hip-Hop Albums (Billboard) | 2 |

=== Year-end charts ===
1994 year-end chart performance for Songs
| Chart (1994) | Position |
|---|---|
| UK Albums (OCC) | 36 |
| US Top R&B/Hip-Hop Albums (Billboard) | 43 |

1995 year-end chart performance for Songs
| Chart (1995) | Position |
|---|---|
| US Billboard 200 | 96 |
| US Top R&B/Hip-Hop Albums (Billboard) | 49 |

== Certifications ==
Certifications for Songs
| Region | Certification | Certified units/sales |
|---|---|---|
| Canada (Music Canada) | Platinum | 100,000^{^} |
| New Zealand (RMNZ) | Gold | 7,500^{^} |
| United Kingdom (BPI) | Platinum | 300,000^{^} |
| United States (RIAA) | 2× Platinum | 2,000,000^{^} |
^{^} Shipments figures based on certification alone.
