= Hot Property (album) =

Studio album by Heatwave
- Released: 27 April 1979
- Recorded: 1978–1979
- Studio: Music Centre, London, England; Sound Track, Copenhagen, Denmark; Utopia, London, England
- Genre: Pop; funk; disco
- Length: 43:13
- Label: GTO (UK); Epic (US)
- Producer: Phil Ramone

Heatwave chronology
Central Heating (1978)	Hot Property (1979)	Candles (1980)

Singles from Hot Property
- 1. "Eyeballin'" Released: 1979 (US); 2. "Razzle Dazzle" Released: 1979 (UK); 3. "One Night Tan" Released: 1979 (US); 4. "Therm Warfare" Released: 1979 (UK)

Professional ratings
Review scores
Source	Rating
AllMusic	4/5 stars
Smash Hits	7/10 stars
The Virgin Encyclopedia of R&B and Soul	2/5 stars

Hot Property is the third album by the British band Heatwave. Arranged, and primarily written by Rod Temperton, it was released on 27 April 1979 on the GTO record label in the United Kingdom, and the Epic label (number 35970) in the United States of America. It was produced by Phil Ramone.

The album was remastered and reissued on compact disc (CD) with bonus tracks in 2010 by Big Break Records (CDBBR 0021).

== Track listing ==
All tracks are written by Rod Temperton, except where noted.

Side one
No.	Title	Length
1.	"Razzle Dazzle"	4:17
2.	"Eyeballin'"	3:53
3.	"This Night We Fell"	4:04
4.	"Raise A Blaze"	3:55
5.	"First Day of Snow"	3:37

Side two
No.	Title	Writer(s)	Length
6.	"One Night Tan"		4:02
7.	"Therm Warfare"		6:44
8.	"All Talked Out"		4:35
9.	"That's the Way We'll Always Say Goodnight"		4:19
10.	"Disco"	Johnnie Wilder, Jr.	3:47

2010 remastered reissue bonus tracks
No.	Title	Writer(s)	Length
11.	"Birthday" (7" version)	Johnnie Wilder, Jr.	3:53
12.	"Eyeballin'" (US 12" disco version)		6:38
13.	"One Night Tan" (US 7" version)		3:55
14.	"Therm Warfare" (UK 7" version)		3:27
15.	"Birthday" (US 12" version)	Johnnie Wilder, Jr.	6:06
Total length:			67:12

== Personnel ==
Heatwave

- Rod Temperton – writer / composer, rhythm track arrangements, vocal arrangements
- Johnnie Wilder, Jr. – lead and backing vocals, percussion
- Keith Wilder – lead vocals
- William L. Jones – lead and rhythm guitars
- Roy Carter – rhythm and bass guitars, keyboards
- Calvin Duke – organ, keyboards
- Derek Bramble – bass
- Ernest "Bilbo" Berger – drums, percussion

== Charts ==
Chart performance for Hot Property
Chart (1979)	Peak position
US Billboard Top LPs	38
US Billboard Top Soul LPs	16

=== Singles ===
Year	Title	Peak chart positions	
Year	Title	UK	US R&B
1979	"Eyeballin'"	–	30
1979	"Razzle Dazzle"	43	–
1979	"One Night Tan"	–	–
1979	"Therm Warfare"	–	–
