= Current (album) =

Studio album by Heatwave
- Released: 28 May 1982
- Recorded: 1981–1982
- Genre: Post-disco
- Length: 41:26
- Label: Epic
- Producer: Barry Blue

Heatwave chronology
Candles (1980)	Current (1982)	Heatwave's Greatest Hits (1984)

Singles from Current
- 1. "Lettin' It Loose" Released: 1982; 2. "Look After Love" Released: 1982; 3. "The Big Guns" Released: 1982 (Japan); 4. "Hold On to the One" Released: 1982 (Japan)

Professional ratings
Review scores
Source	Rating
AllMusic	3/5 stars

Current is the fifth studio album by funk-disco band Heatwave, released in 1982 on the Epic label. It was produced by Barry Blue.

It was the last Heatwave album to feature vocalist Johnnie Wilder Jr. before his departure to pursue a solo career, as well as their final album to feature Rod Temperton as the band's primary songwriter, although he continued to write songs for other musicians until his death in 2016. It was also the final Heatwave album to feature Derek Bramble before his departure to focus on a career in production.

The album also includes guest vocals and harmony work from British singer and lead vocalist from the group Imagination, Leee John. Wilder Jr. requested him and was enough impressed with John, eventually considering him to become a member of Heatwave and somehow taking his own place within the group.

The album was remastered and reissued with bonus tracks in 2010 by Big Break Records.

== Track listing ==
All tracks are written by Rod Temperton, except where noted.

Side one
No.	Title	Writer(s)	Length
1.	"Lettin' It Loose"		4:20
2.	"State to State"		4:57
3.	"Look After Love"		5:33
4.	"Naturally"	Barry Blue, Robin Smith	4:34
Total length:			19:24

Side two
No.	Title	Writer(s)	Length
5.	"The Big Guns"		5:12
6.	"Find It in Your Heart"	Barry Blue, Robin Smith	4:38
7.	"Hold On to the One"		5:58
8.	"Mind What You Find"	Derek Bramble	6:14
Total length:			22:02

2010 remastered reissue bonus tracks
No.	Title	Writer(s)	Length
9.	"Lettin' It Loose" (12" version)		6:15
10.	"Look After Love" (single version)		4:22
11.	"Mind What You Find" (12" version)	Derek Bramble	6:50

== Personnel ==
Heatwave

- Johnnie Wilder, Jr. – vocals
- Keith Wilder – vocals
- William L. Jones – guitars, vocals
- Keith Harrison – keyboards, vocals, synthesizers
- Calvin Duke – keyboards, vocals, synthesizers
- Derek Bramble – bass
- Ernest "Bilbo" Berger – drums

with:

- Mel Gaynor – additional drums

== Charts ==
Chart performance for Current
Chart (1982)	Peak position
US Billboard Top LPs	156
US Billboard Top Black LPs	21

=== Singles ===
Year	Title	Peak position
Year	Title	US R&B
1982	"Lettin' It Loose"	54
