= Too Hot to Handle (Heatwave album) =

- North American sleeve

Studio album by Heatwave
- Released: 15 June 1976
- Recorded: 1975–1976
- Studios: Audio International, London, UK
- Genres: R&B; funk; disco
- Length: 38:36
- Labels: GTO (UK); Epic (US)
- Producer: Barry Blue

Heatwave chronology
Too Hot to Handle (1976)	Central Heating (1977)

Singles from Too Hot to Handle
- 1. "Ain't No Half Steppin'" Released: 1976; 2. "Super Soul Sister" Released: 1976; 3. "Boogie Nights" Released: June 1977; 4. "Too Hot To Handle" Released: 1977; 5. "Always and Forever" Released: December 1977

Professional ratings
Review scores
Source	Rating
AllMusic	4/5 stars

Too Hot to Handle is the debut album by funk-disco band Heatwave, released on 15 June 1976 on the GTO label in the UK and on 30 May 1977 on the Epic label in the US. It was produced by Barry Blue.

The song "Turn Out the Lamplight," written by Rod Temperton, appeared on George Benson's album Give Me the Night, which was produced by Quincy Jones. The album was remastered and reissued with bonus tracks in 2015 by Big Break Records.

== Track listing ==
All tracks are written by Rod Temperton.

Side one
No.	Title	Length
1.	"Too Hot to Handle"	3:44
2.	"Boogie Nights"	5:03
3.	"Ain't No Half Steppin'"	5:09
4.	"Always and Forever"	6:14

Side two
No.	Title	Length
5.	"Super Soul Sister"	3:56
6.	"All You Do Is Dial"	4:11
7.	"Lay It on Me"	3:16
8.	"Sho'nuff Must Be Luv"	4:05
9.	"Beat Your Booty"	3:00

2015 remastered reissue bonus tracks
No.	Title	Length
10.	"Turn Out the Lamplight"	4:51
11.	"Slip Your Disc to This"	3:51
12.	"Special Offer"	3:09
13.	"Boogie Nights" (single version)	3:41
14.	"Too Hot to Handle" (single version)	3:25
15.	"Always and Forever" (single version)	4:51
16.	"Ain't No Half Steppin'" (single version)	3:25
17.	"Boogie Nights" (12" disco version)	4:39

=== U.S. Cassette Tape Release ===
All tracks are written by Rod Temperton.

Side one
No.	Title	Length
1.	"Too Hot to Handle"
2.	"Boogie Nights"
3.	"Ain't No Half Steppin'"
4.	"Sho'nuff Must Be Luv"

Side two
No.	Title	Length
5.	"Super Soul Sister"
6.	"All You Do Is Dial"
7.	"Lay It on Me"
8.	"Always and Forever"
9.	"Beat Your Booty"

== Personnel ==
- Johnnie Wilder, Jr. – lead (3–9) and backing vocals, percussion
- Keith Wilder – lead vocals (1, 2)
- Eric Johns – guitars
- Rod Temperton – keyboards, synthesizer
- Mario Mantese – bass guitar
- Ernest "Bilbo" Berger – drums, percussion

== Charts ==
Chart performance for Too Hot to Handle
Chart (1977)	Peak position
UK Albums Chart	46
Billboard Top LPs	11
Billboard Top Soul LPs	5

=== Singles ===
Year	Title	Peak chart positions		
Year	Title	UK	US	US R&B
1976	"Ain't No Half Steppin'"	—	—	—
1976	"Super Soul Sister"	—	—	—
1977	"Boogie Nights"	2	2	5
1977	"Too Hot to Handle" / "Slip Your Disc to This"	15	—	—
1977	"Always and Forever"	9	18	2
