= Love X Love =

Single by George Benson

from the album Give Me the Night
- B-side: "Love Dance"
- Released: September 1980
- Genre: Post-disco
- Length: 3:48 (single edit) / 4:45 (album)
- Label: Warner Bros.
- Songwriter: Rod Temperton
- Producer: Quincy Jones

George Benson singles chronology
"Give Me the Night" (1980)	"Love X Love" (1980)	"What's on Your Mind" (1980)

Professional ratings
Review scores
Source	Rating
Billboard	(unrated)

"Love X Love" is a song written by Heatwave's keyboard player Rod Temperton and recorded by American guitarist and singer George Benson. Featured on Benson's Give Me the Night album, it was also released as a single. In Britain, it entered the UK Singles Chart on 26 July 1980 and reached a peak position of number 10, remaining in the chart for eight weeks. In the US "Love X Love" made the Hot 100 and was a Top 10 soul hit.

== Charts ==
Chart (1980)	Peak position
Australia (Kent Music Report)	57
Ireland (IRMA)	20
New Zealand (Recorded Music NZ)	8
UK Singles (Official Charts)	10
US Billboard Hot 100	61
US Hot R&B/Hip-Hop Songs (Billboard)	9
