= Endless Love (song) =

1981 single by Lionel Richie and Diana Ross

- Cover art for UK, Italian, and Greek vinyl releases

Single by Diana Ross and Lionel Richie

from the album Endless Love (1981 soundtrack)
- B-side: "Endless Love" (instrumental)
- Released: June 26, 1981 (US)
- Recorded: 1981
- Genre: R&B
- Length: 4:24
- Label: Motown
- Songwriter: Lionel Richie
- Producer: Lionel Richie

Diana Ross singles chronology
| "Cryin' My Heart Out for You" (1981) | "Endless Love" (1981) | "Why Do Fools Fall in Love" (1981) |

Lionel Richie singles chronology
| "Endless Love" (1981) | "Truly" (1982) |

Audio video
- "Endless Love" on YouTube

"Endless Love" is a song written and produced by Lionel Richie and originally recorded as a duet between Richie and singer/actress Diana Ross for the soundtrack to the coming-of-age film of the same name, starring Brooke Shields. In this ballad, the singers declare their "endless love" for one another. It was covered by Luther Vandross with R&B-pop singer Mariah Carey, and also by country music singer Shania Twain. Billboard has named the original version as the most successful duet on the Billboard Hot 100 of all time. It was Ross' final single with Motown Records as she would sign with RCA Records shortly before its release and Richie's first single as a solo artist prior to him leaving his longtime band, the Commodores.

== Background and recording ==
Lionel Richie had been commissioned to produce the soundtrack to Franco Zeffirelli's film adaptation of Scott Spencer's novel Endless Love. Originally, Zeffirelli wanted Richie to compose an instrumental theme. Later, Zeffirelli decided the song should have lyrics and be recorded by a particular female artist, with Zeffirelli suggesting Diana Ross. Then in the last minute, Richie was told to make the song a duet, to which he volunteered to do the male lead.

At the time, Ross was struggling with negotiations to resign a new contract with Motown after becoming a free agent following the end of her previous contract with the label in November 1980, just as Ross was enjoying a commercial revival with her album, Diana. Ross had received several recording offers, including a very lucrative deal with RCA Records for $20 million. During negotiations, Ross learned from her accountants that despite recording for Motown for twenty years that she was only worth $250,000 despite several hit albums and singles for the label, during her tenure with the Supremes and as a solo artist.

Around the same time, Richie was also dealing with growing estrangement from his band, the Commodores, as Richie was often the center of attention in the group by the media, who would sometimes write articles dismissing the Commodores' funk sound and compared it to Richie's love for adult contemporary music, having penned and led on the group's number one ballads "Three Times a Lady" and "Still". Richie was later encouraged by both band mates and Motown to start his solo career.

Richie had also composed and produced Kenny Rogers' number one hit "Lady", which had originally been written for a Commodores album but was turned down by the group in protest.

Ross and Richie recorded the vocals for the song together around three in the morning at a late night recording session in Reno, where Ross had just finished a performance a couple hours earlier. According to Ross and Richie, the session went very quickly, but not smoothly.

In her 1993 memoir, Secrets of a Sparrow, Ross claimed: "I am a perfectionist. I like to be on time always. Lionel was not always on time. I did work very well, however, with the producer, James Carmichael, who is also a perfectionist."

By the time Motown decided on releasing the ballad as a single, Ross officially left the label, signing the $20 million deal with RCA. It was the most lucrative recording deal in history at the time.

In the film, Jamie Bernstein, daughter of conductor/composer Leonard Bernstein, appears as the character Susan in a party scene singing the song, with vocals attributed to Shea Chambers, who was uncredited.

=== Composition ===
"Endless Love"
Diana Ross and Lionel Richie "Endless Love" from Endless Love: Original Motion Picture Soundtrack

"Endless Love" is a R&B and pop power ballad. According to the sheet music provided by Warner Chappell Music, "Endless Love" has a "moderately slow" tempo of 110 beats per minute. Its major key is at B♭ major with a chord progression of B♭-E♭-E♭/F-Fsus-F-B♭. The instrumental range on the song goes from B♭1 to D6 while Richie's and Ross's vocal ranges span from B♭3 to E♭5. The string arrangement in the song was provided by Gene Page while Richie played piano and fellow Commodores member Thomas McClary played lead guitar.

== Release ==
Produced by Richie and James Anthony Carmichael and arranged by Gene Page, it was released as a single from the film's soundtrack on June 26, 1981.

Ross recorded a solo version of the song for her first RCA Records album, Why Do Fools Fall in Love, the duet version being her last hit on Motown. Richie's solo version was released on the 2003 remastered bonus edition of his 1982 album Lionel Richie.

=== Commercial performance ===
While the film Endless Love was a modest box-office success, the song became the second-biggest selling single of the year (first was "Bette Davis Eyes" by Kim Carnes) in the United States and reached number one on the Hot 100, where it stayed for nine weeks from August 15 to October 10, 1981. It also topped the Billboard R&B chart and the Adult Contemporary chart, and reached number seven in the United Kingdom.

It also became the most successful duet of the rock era, surpassing the Everly Brothers' 1957 hit "Wake Up Little Susie", which spent four weeks at number one. Both songs spent six months on the chart, with "Endless Love" eclipsing the Everlys' hit by one week.

The record became the best-selling single of Ross' career, becoming her sixth and final number one single on the Billboard Hot 100 as a solo artist, which was then the most number ones achieved by a female solo artist until Whitney Houston's 1988 ballad, "Where Do Broken Hearts Go", topped the Hot 100 in April 1988, in which Houston achieved a historic seventh consecutive number one single on the chart.

It is also Richie's best-charting single, and the first of several hits for him during the 1980s.

For three weeks from September 5, 1981 to September 26, 1981, the single spent three weeks simultaneously at number one on three major Billboard charts: the Billboard Hot 100, R&B and Adult Contemporary chart. To this day, it remains the only duet single to accomplish the feat. It trails behind Ray Charles' "I Can't Stop Loving You" and Whitney Houston's "I Will Always Love You", who spent more weeks at four and five respectively, and is tied in third place with Vanessa Williams' "Save the Best for Last".

It was also the first of Richie's four "triple-crown" number one Billboard hits, a chart record that to this day he shares with Houston.

=== Critical reception ===
Record World called it a "super ballad" that is "overflowing with drama and tenderness".

== Accolades ==
The song was nominated for an Academy Award for Best Original Song for Richie, and was the second song with which Ross was involved that was nominated for an Oscar. The song earned Ross and Richie two Grammy Award nominations at the 24th Annual Grammy Awards, including Record of the Year and Best Pop Vocal Performance by a Duo or Group, losing the former award to "Bette Davis Eyes" by Kim Carnes and the latter award to "The Boy from New York City" by The Manhattan Transfer. In addition, Richie was nominated for Song of the Year for the song, losing also to "Bette Davis Eyes". At the 1982 American Music Awards, the song won Ross and Richie the awards for Favorite Pop/Rock Song and Favorite Soul/R&B Song, the first of just two songs to earn both awards followed by Whitney Houston's "I Will Always Love You" in 1994.

== Charts ==
=== Weekly charts ===
Weekly chart performance for "Endless Love"
| Chart (1981) | Peak position |
|---|---|
| Australia (Kent Music Report) | 1 |
| Belgium (Ultratop 50 Flanders) | 6 |
| Canada Top Singles (RPM) | 1 |
| Finland (Suomen virallinen lista) | 6 |
| Ireland (IRMA) | 9 |
| Italy (Musica e dischi) | 24 |
| Luxembourg (Radio Luxembourg) | 3 |
| Netherlands (Dutch Top 40) | 4 |
| Netherlands (Single Top 100) | 10 |
| New Zealand (Recorded Music NZ) | 3 |
| Norway (VG-lista) | 8 |
| South Africa (Springbok) | 1 |
| Sweden (Sverigetopplistan) | 5 |
| Switzerland (Schweizer Hitparade) | 6 |
| UK Singles (Official Charts) | 7 |
| US Billboard Hot 100 | 1 |
| US Adult Contemporary (Billboard) | 1 |
| US Hot Soul Singles (Billboard) | 1 |
| US Cash Box Top 100 | 1 |

=== Year-end charts ===
Year-end chart performance for "Endless Love"
| Chart (1981) | Rank |
|---|---|
| Australia (Kent Music Report) | 8 |
| Canada | 3 |
| Netherlands (Dutch Top 40) | 48 |
| Netherlands (Single Top 100) | 87 |
| New Zealand | 42 |
| South Africa | 6 |
| UK | 76 |
| US Billboard Hot 100 | 2 |
| US Cash Box Top 100 | 1 |

=== Decade-end charts ===
Decade-end chart performance for "Endless Love"
| Chart (1980–1989) | Rank |
|---|---|
| US Billboard Hot 100 | 3 |

=== All-time charts ===
All-time chart performance for "Endless Love"
| Chart (1958–2018) | Position |
|---|---|
| US Billboard Hot 100 | 18 |

== Certifications ==
Certifications for "Endless Love"
| Region | Certification | Certified units/sales |
|---|---|---|
| Australia (ARIA) | Platinum | 100,000^{^} |
| Canada (Music Canada) | Platinum | 150,000^{^} |
| New Zealand (RMNZ) | Platinum | 30,000^{‡} |
| Spain (Promusicae) | Gold | 30,000^{‡} |
| United Kingdom (BPI) sales since 2004 | Platinum | 600,000^{‡} |
| United States (RIAA) | Platinum | 2,000,000^{^} |
^{^} Shipments figures based on certification alone.^{‡} Sales+streaming figures based on certification alone.

== Credits ==
- Lionel Richie – lead vocals, vocal arrangements
- Diana Ross – lead vocals
- Reginald "Sonny" Burke – Fender Rhodes
- Barnaby Finch – acoustic piano
- Paul Jackson Jr. – electric guitar, acoustic guitar solo
- Fred Tackett – guitar
- Nathan East – bass guitar
- Rick Shlosser – drums
- Gene Page – horn, rhythm and string arrangements
- Harry Bluestone – concertmaster

== Luther Vandross and Mariah Carey version ==
"Endless Love"

Single by Luther Vandross and Mariah Carey

from the album Songs
- Released: August 26, 1994
- Studio: The Hit Factory (New York City)
- Genre: R&B; soul
- Length: 4:21
- Label: Columbia; Epic
- Songwriter: Lionel Richie
- Producer: Walter Afanasieff

Luther Vandross singles chronology
| "Never Let Me Go" (1993) | "Endless Love" (1994) | "Always and Forever" (1994) |

Mariah Carey singles chronology
| "Anytime You Need a Friend" (1994) | "Endless Love" (1994) | "All I Want for Christmas Is You" (1994) |

Music video
- "Endless Love" on YouTube

"Endless Love"
Luther Vandross and Mariah Carey's "Endless Love" from Songs

Walter Afanasieff produced Luther Vandross and Mariah Carey's cover of "Endless Love" for Vandross' album Songs (1994), and it is known for being Carey's first "high-profile" duet (an earlier duet, "I'll Be There", was with the then-unknown background singer Trey Lorenz). At the 1995 Grammy Awards, the song was nominated in the new category of Best Pop Collaboration with Vocals, losing to "Funny How Time Slips Away" by Al Green and Lyle Lovett. Columbia Records later included the song on Carey's compilation album Greatest Hits (2001) and then again on her next compilation album, The Ballads (2008). It was released as the second single on August 26, 1994, from Songs, and on the 30th Anniversary Edition of Carey's Music Box (2023).

=== Recording ===
Sony Music Entertainment President Tommy Mottola suggested that Vandross record Songs, an album of cover versions. Featuring Vandross' versions of songs like Stephen Stills' "Love the One You're With", Heatwave's "Always and Forever", and Roberta Flack's "Killing Me Softly", the album was shaping up to be a major career accomplishment. To give the album a bigger boost, Mottola's then-wife, Mariah Carey, came up with the idea to remake "Endless Love" as a duet with her. Lionel Richie and Diana Ross had originally recorded "Endless Love" in 1981, and the song spent nine weeks at number 1. Although Luther's album was already set to contain one Lionel Richie composition, "Hello", it was obvious that having the most-popular female artist on the Sony label singing on the album would be a benefit.

=== Critical reception ===
AllMusic senior editor Stephen Thomas Erlewine highlighted the track. Larry Flick from Billboard magazine noted that it is "framed with beautiful, swelling strings (how 'bout those harps and rolling drums at the song's climax!)." He added, "Carey is at her most colorful and effective here, fluttering around Vandross' distinctive phrasing with ease and agility." Steve Baltin from Cash Box deemed it "a guaranteed smash." He explained further, "The passionate song is the perfect vehicle for their emotive singing styles. In addition, they know not to argue with success, staying true to the original." Entertainment Weekly's Jeremy Helligar wrote that the album might very will give Vandross a number one hit with "Endless Love" but still called the song "drippy." A reviewer from Music & Media commented, "A compliment should go out to the casting director, who brought together two partners of equal magnitude to render the plush duet Diana Ross & Lionel Richie made famous." Alan Jones from Music Week gave it a score of four out of five, adding that the song "finds Vandross and Carey singing around each other, rather than with each other". He noted further, "They do so against a backing track that is almost identical to the original, and the result will be identical too – a Top 10 hit."

=== Commercial performance ===
On the US Billboard Hot 100, "Endless Love" debuted on September 10, 1994, at number 31 and peaked at number two. The song became Luther Vandross' highest-charting pop hit ever and gave Lionel Richie his first top-10 single as a songwriter in seven years. It became Vandross's fifth top-10 single and Carey's 12th. It remained in the top 40 for 13 weeks and was ranked number 56 on the Hot 100 1994 year-end chart. It was certified Platinum by the Recording Industry Association of America (RIAA).

The song was a success outside the United States, reaching the top of the chart in New Zealand (for five weeks) and the top five in the United Kingdom, Australia, Ireland, and the Netherlands. It also reached the top 20 in most of the countries. It was certified Platinum in Australia by the Australian Recording Industry Association (ARIA) and in New Zealand by the Recording Industry Association of New Zealand (RIANZ). The song has sold and streamed over 400,000 units in the UK.

=== Music video ===
Two music videos were released for the single; one features Carey and Vandross recording the song in a studio, and the other shows the two performing the song live at Royal Albert Hall. The latter performance is included on the Luther Vandross: From Luther with Love music video collection in DVD format.

=== Track listings ===
- 7-inch single
1. "Endless Love" – 4:21
2. "Endless Love" (instrumental) – 4:22
- Japanese mini-CD single
1. "Endless Love" – 4:21
2. "Endless Love" (Mariah only) – 4:22
3. "Endless Love" (Luther only) – 4:22
4. "Endless Love" (instrumental) – 4:22
- UK and European CD maxi single
1. "Endless Love" – 4:21
2. "Endless Love" (instrumental) – 4:22
3. "Never Too Much (live) – 5:00
4. "Any Love" (live) – 5:22
5. "She Won't Talk to Me" (live) – 5:14

=== Personnel ===
- Luther Vandross, Mariah Carey: vocals
- Lionel Richie: songwriter
- Walter Afanasieff: producer, arranger, orchestrator, keyboards, piano, drum programming, Minimoog bass, Fairlight acoustic bass, Synclavier acoustic guitar, programming
- Dan Shea: keyboards, synthesizer programming, MacIntosh programming
- Ren Klyce: Akai AX60, Roland Juno-106 and Synclavier programming
- Gary Cirimelli: Synclavier programming
- Dann Huff: acoustic guitar, electric guitar and nylon guitar solo
- The London Symphony Orchestra: orchestra
- Jeremy Lubbock: orchestrator, conductor

=== Charts ===
==== Weekly charts ====
| Chart (1994) | Peak position |
|---|---|
| Australia (ARIA) | 2 |
| Austria (Ö3 Austria Top 40) | 13 |
| Belgium (Ultratop 50 Flanders) | 2 |
| Canada Retail Singles (The Record) | 14 |
| Canada Contemporary Hit Radio (The Record) | 8 |
| Canada Pop Adult (The Record) | 4 |
| Canada Top Singles (RPM) | 6 |
| Canada Adult Contemporary (RPM) | 4 |
| Europe (Eurochart Hot 100) | 7 |
| Europe (European AC Top 25) | 3 |
| Europe (European Dance Radio) | 4 |
| Europe (European Hit Radio) | 3 |
| Finland (Suomen virallinen lista) | 11 |
| France (SNEP) | 12 |
| Germany (Official German Charts) | 14 |
| Iceland (Íslenski Listinn Topp 40) | 5 |
| Ireland (IRMA) | 4 |
| Israel (Israeli Singles Chart) | 10 |
| Italy (Musica e dischi) | 8 |
| Netherlands (Dutch Top 40) | 4 |
| Netherlands (Single Top 100) | 6 |
| New Zealand (Recorded Music NZ) | 1 |
| Norway (VG-lista) | 6 |
| Scottish Singles Sales (Official Charts) | 6 |
| Sweden (Sverigetopplistan) | 10 |
| Switzerland (Schweizer Hitparade) | 6 |
| UK Singles (Official Charts) | 3 |
| UK Hip Hop/R&B (Official Charts) | 5 |
| UK Airplay (Music Week) | 2 |
| US Billboard Hot 100 | 2 |
| US Adult Contemporary (Billboard) | 11 |
| US Dance Singles Sales (Billboard) | 25 |
| US Hot R&B/Hip-Hop Songs (Billboard) | 7 |
| US Pop Airplay (Billboard) | 7 |
| US Rhythmic Airplay (Billboard) | 5 |
| US Cash Box Top 100 | 3 |
| US Adult Contemporary (Radio & Records) | 4 |
| US CHR/Top 40 (Radio & Records) | 4 |
| US Hot AC/Adult CHR (Radio & Records) | 12 |
| US Urban Contemporary (Radio & Records) | 6 |

| Chart (2014) | Peak position |
|---|---|
| South Korea International (Gaon) | 63 |

==== Year-end charts ====
| Chart (1994) | Rank |
|---|---|
| Australia (ARIA) | 27 |
| Belgium (Ultratop 50 Flanders) | 20 |
| Brazil (Mais Tocadas) | 49 |
| Canada Top Singles (RPM) | 56 |
| Canada Adult Contemporary (RPM) | 52 |
| Europe (Eurochart Hot 100) | 43 |
| Europe (European Hit Radio) | 36 |
| Iceland (Íslenski Listinn Topp 40) | 38 |
| Netherlands (Dutch Top 40) | 62 |
| Netherlands (Single Top 100) | 58 |
| New Zealand (RIANZ) | 10 |
| Sweden (Topplistan) | 77 |
| Switzerland (Schweizer Hitparade) | 49 |
| UK Singles (OCC) | 44 |
| UK Airplay (Music Week) | 47 |
| US Billboard Hot 100 | 56 |
| US Hot R&B Singles (Billboard) | 88 |
| US Cash Box Top 100 | 37 |
| US Adult Contemporary (Radio & Records) | 28 |
| US Contemporary Hit Radio (Radio & Records) | 46 |
| US Urban (Radio & Records) | 69 |

| Chart (1995) | Rank |
|---|---|
| Canada Retail Singles (The Record) | 28 |

=== Certifications ===
| Region | Certification | Certified units/sales |
|---|---|---|
| Australia (ARIA) | Platinum | 70,000^{^} |
| Japan (RIAJ) | Gold | 50,000^{^} |
| New Zealand (RMNZ) | Platinum | 10,000^{*} |
| New Zealand (RMNZ) digital | Gold | 15,000^{‡} |
| United Kingdom (BPI) | Gold | 400,000^{‡} |
| United States (RIAA) | Platinum | 1,000,000^{‡} |
^{*} Sales figures based on certification alone.^{^} Shipments figures based on certification alone.^{‡} Sales+streaming figures based on certification alone.

=== Release history ===
| Region | Date | Format(s) | Label(s) | Ref. |
|---|---|---|---|---|
| United States | August 26, 1994 | 7-inch vinyl; cassette; maxi cassette; CD; maxi CD | Columbia | |
| Australia | September 5, 1994 | Cassette; CD | Epic | |
| United Kingdom | September 5, 1994 | 7-inch vinyl; cassette; CD | Epic | |

== Lionel Richie and Shania Twain version ==
"Endless Love"

Single by Lionel Richie featuring Shania Twain

from the album Tuskegee
- Released: February 7, 2012
- Recorded: 2011
- Studio: Pain in the Art Studios (Nashville, TN); Blackbird Studio (Nashville, TN); Avatar Studios (New York, NY)
- Genre: Country pop
- Length: 4:18
- Label: Universal Music Nashville
- Songwriter: Lionel Richie
- Producers: Nathan Chapman; Lionel Richie

Lionel Richie singles chronology
| "All Night Long" (2011) | "Endless Love" (2012) | "Say You, Say Me" (2012) |

Shania Twain singles chronology
| "Today Is Your Day" (2011) | "Endless Love" (2012) | "Life's About to Get Good" (2017) |

Music video
- "Endless Love" on YouTube

Lionel Richie re-recorded the song in 2011 as a duet with Canadian country pop singer Shania Twain. It was released as the lead single from his album Tuskegee on February 7, 2012. The recording process of the song was documented in the final episode of Twain's reality docudrama series, Why Not? with Shania Twain, which aired on June 12, 2011.

=== Music video ===
A music video for the song was recorded in The Bahamas in February 2012. Directed by Paul Boyd, the video was released to country music channels CMT and GAC on March 23, 2012.

=== Charts ===
==== Weekly charts ====
| Chart (2012) | Peak position |
|---|---|
| Belgium (Ultratip Bubbling Under Flanders) | 77 |
| US Bubbling Under Hot 100 (Billboard) | 16 |
| US Adult Contemporary (Billboard) | 12 |
| US Hot Singles Sales (Billboard) | 1 |

==== Year-end charts ====
| Chart (2012) | Position |
|---|---|
| US Adult Contemporary (Billboard) | 30 |

== Other versions ==
Kenny Rogers also recorded the song.

In the 1996 Friends episode "The One with the Giant Poking Device", Chandler and Phoebe sing an off-key duet of the song.

The song is used during a scene in a hockey rink in the 1996 comedy Happy Gilmore starring Adam Sandler.

In 2014, Poison frontman Bret Michaels starred in a TV commercial for Nissan vans in which he performed the song, backed by Kiki Wong on lead guitar.

In 2009, the song was covered on the show Glee.

In 2009, housemates Ulrika Jonsson and Verne Troyer covered the song in a task set by Big Brother on Celebrity Big Brother 6.

== See also ==
- List of Billboard Hot 100 number-one singles of 1981
- List of number-one R&B singles of 1981 (U.S.)
