= Hot Property =

Hot Property may refer to:

- Hot Property (album), a 1979 album by Heatwave
- Hot Property (film), a 2016 British comedy film
- Hot Property (Australian TV series), a 1999–2013 real estate show
- Hot Property (British TV series), a 1997–1998 property show
