= Cryin' My Heart Out for You =

Single by Diana Ross

from the album To Love Again
- B-side: "To Love Again"
- Released: March 21, 1981
- Genre: Pop
- Length: 3:36
- Label: Motown
- Songwriters: Allee Willis; Michael Masser
- Producer: Michael Masser

Diana Ross singles chronology
"One More Chance" (1981)	"Cryin' My Heart Out for You" (1981)	"Endless Love" (1981)

"Cryin' My Heart Out for You" is a song recorded by American singer Diana Ross. It was written both by Allee Willis and its producer Michael Masser. The song was released on March 21, 1981 by Motown as the third single single in support of the 1981 compilation To Love Again when it became known that Ross had signed a contract with RCA, and just a month before the release of "Endless Love". The song was not a great success, reaching only number 58 in the UK chart. It's flip side "To Love Again", made it to #103 on Cash Box.

== Critical reception ==
A reviewer for Billboard magazine wrote: "Ross follows 'It's My Turn' and 'One More Chance' with yet another sleek Michael Masser composition. Ross' velvety vocal glides over the lush arrangement in what should be a big pop, adult contemporary and black radio hit."

== Track listing ==
7" single
A. "Cryin' My Heart Out for You" – 3:36
B. "To Love Again" (Gerry Goffin, Michael Masser) – 4:06

== Charts ==
Chart performance for "Cryin' My Heart Out for You"
Chart (1981)	Peak position
UK Singles (OCC)	58
