= All I Am =

All I Am may refer to:

- "All I Am" (Jess Glynne song), 2018
- "All I Am" (Lynsey de Paul and Susan Sheridan song), 1980
- "All I Am", a song by Alice in Chains from Rainier Fog
