= What's On Your Mind =

What's on Your Mind may refer to:

- "What's on Your Mind" (George Benson song), 1981
- "What's on Your Mind (Pure Energy)", 1988 song by Information Society
- "What's on Your Mind?", 1978 song by Ace Frehley from Ace Frehley
- "What's on Your Mind?", 2019 song by Alessia Cara from This Summer
- "What's on Your Mind", 1979 song by John Denver from John Denver
- "What's on Your Mind?", 2008 song by Madrugada from Madrugada
