= Central Heating (Heatwave album) =

Studio album by Heatwave
- Released: 31 March 1978
- Recorded: 1976–1977
- Studio: Audio International (London); Utopia (London); Morgan (London); Marquee (London); AIR (London)
- Genre: R&B; funk; disco
- Length: 38:32
- Label: GTO (UK); Epic (US)
- Producer: Barry Blue

Heatwave chronology
Too Hot to Handle (1976)	Central Heating (1978)	Hot Property (1979)

Singles from Central Heating
- 1. "The Groove Line" Released: 1977; 2. "Mind Blowing Decisions" Released: 1977

Professional ratings
Review scores
Source	Rating
AllMusic	4/5 stars
Christgau's Record Guide	C−
The Virgin Encyclopedia of R&B and Soul	3/5 stars

Central Heating is the second studio album by funk-disco band Heatwave. It was released in 1977 on the GTO label in the UK and in 1978 on the Epic label in the US. It was produced by Barry Blue. Central Heating sold more than a million copies in its first two years of release.

It was the last Heatwave album to feature bassist Mario Mantese and guitarist Eric Johns, as well as the first to feature new member Roy Carter on guitar. The album was also the final performance of Rod Temperton as an official member of Heatwave, although he would continue to write songs for the band after his departure until 1982.

The song "Star of a Story," written by Temperton, appeared on George Benson's album Give Me the Night, which was produced by Quincy Jones.

The album was remastered and reissued with bonus tracks in 2015 by Big Break Records.

The two singles taken from the album were both hits. "The Groove Line" reached No. 7 in the US and No. 12 in the UK, while "Mind Blowing Decisions" also made No. 12 in the UK.

== Track listing ==
All tracks are written by Rod Temperton, except where noted.

Side one
No.	Title	Writer(s)	Length
1.	"Put the Word Out"		6:36
2.	"Send Out for Sunshine"		4:28
3.	"Central Heating"		4:46
4.	"Happiness Togetherness"	Johnnie Wilder, Jr.	4:00

Side two
No.	Title	Writer(s)	Length
5.	"The Groove Line"		4:20
6.	"Mind Blowing Decisions"	Johnnie Wilder, Jr.	4:16
7.	"The Star of a Story"		5:45
8.	"Party Poops"		3:51
9.	"Leavin' for a Dream"		3:23

2015 remastered reissue bonus tracks
No.	Title	Length
10.	"Wack That Axe"	3:46
11.	"The Groove Line" (12" disco version)	7:26
12.	"Mind Blowing Decisions" (12" disco version)	7:31

== Personnel ==
Heatwave

- Johnnie Wilder Jr. – lead, backing, and choir vocals, congas
- Keith Wilder – lead vocals
- Rod Temperton – Acoustic and Fender Rhodes electric piano, clavinet, synthesizers, organ
- Mario Mantese – bass guitar
- Eric Johns – electric lead and rhythm guitars, Spanish guitar
- Ernest "Bilbo" Berger – drums, timbales
- Roy Carter – rhythm and bass guitar, Fender Rhodes piano, acoustic piano

Other musicians

- Frank Ricotti, Tristan Fry – percussion
- Chris Payne – trombone solo on "Happiness Togetherness"
- Ron Mathieson – acoustic bass on "Leaving for a Dream"
- Pat Halling – string leader

Technical

- James Guthrie, Geoff Calver – engineers

== Charts ==
Chart performance for Central Heating
Chart (1978)	Peak position
UK Albums Chart	26
Billboard Top LPs	10
Billboard Top Soul LPs	2

=== Singles ===
Year	Title	Peak chart positions		
Year	Title	UK	US	US R&B
1978	"The Groove Line"	12	7	3
1978	"Mind Blowing Decisions"	12	—	49
