= Always and Forever (Heatwave song) =

1977 single by Heatwave

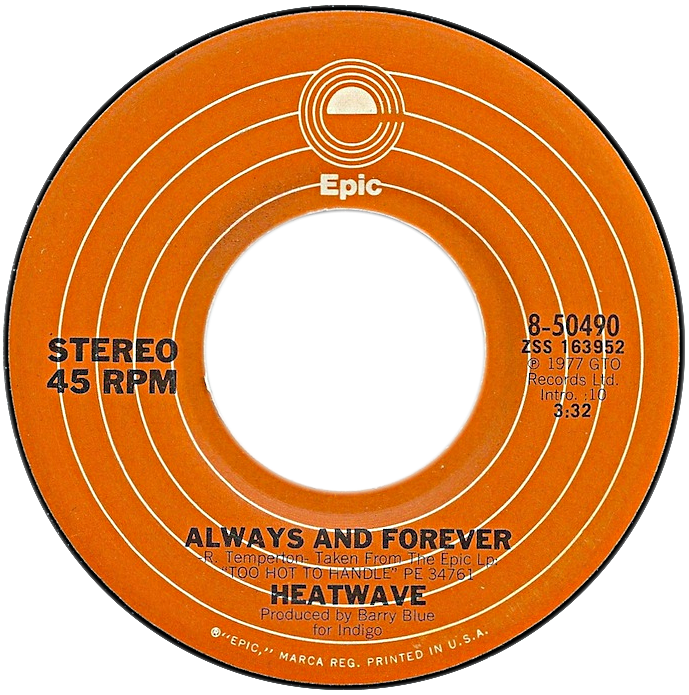
- Side A of US 7-inch single

Single by Heatwave

from the album Too Hot to Handle
- B-side: "Mind Blowing Decisions" (UK); "Super Soul Sister" (US)
- Released: 3 December 1977
- Recorded: 1976
- Genre: R&B, soul
- Length: 3:32 (single edit); 6:14 (album version)
- Label: GTO (UK); Epic 50490 (US)
- Songwriter: Rod Temperton
- Producer: Barry Blue

Heatwave singles chronology
"Too Hot to Handle" (1977)	"Always and Forever" (1977)	"The Groove Line" (1977)

"Always and Forever" is an R&B song written by Rod Temperton and produced by Barry Blue. It was first recorded by the British-based multinational funk-disco band Heatwave in 1976. Released as a single on 3 December 1977, the song is included on Heatwave's debut album, Too Hot to Handle (1976), and has been covered by numerous artists, becoming something of a standard.

The song reached numbers 12 and 18 on the US Cash Box Top 100 and Billboard Hot 100 charts in March 1978, after peaking at number two on the Billboard R&B chart, the band's highest showing on that tally. The single was certified platinum by the RIAA on 6 September 2001. In the UK, the songs "Too Hot to Handle" and "The Groove Line" were released before a double A-sided "Always and Forever" / "Mind Blowing Decisions" single was issued in November 1978. This became the band's second top 10 hit on the UK Singles Chart when it spent two weeks at number nine in December.

== Heatwave version ==
After the international success of Heatwave's disco single "Boogie Nights", "Always and Forever" was chosen as the US follow-up single in late 1977. A ballad featuring lead vocals by Johnnie Wilder Jr., "Always and Forever" stood out among the band's predominantly disco repertoire and became a successful US hit song in early 1978.

In the late 1970s through to the 1980s, it was a popular "slow dance" song at high school proms and weddings, particularly in inner-city areas with a high minority population. The song was also played during a slow dance scene in the movie House Party.

In the liner notes to Heatwave's 1996 compilation album, The Best of Heatwave: Always and Forever, music writer and former Billboard contributor Brian Chin notes that Wilder

says that it was right around the time of the single release of "Always and Forever" that he knew Heatwave's music would stand the test of time. This pop standard is emblematic of the Heatwave fusion of influences – R&B, teen romance, and both European and American flavours of pop.

AllMusic reviewer Craig Lytle states that the song "was and continues to be an ageless piece. Johnnie Wilder's vocal exhibition throughout the vamp is breathtaking."

In 2009, Essence magazine included the song in their list of the "25 Best Slow Jams of All Time".

== Charts ==
=== Weekly charts ===
Chart (1977–1978)	Peak position
Canada Top Singles (RPM)	10
Canada Adult Contemporary (RPM)	28
Ireland (IRMA)	17
UK Singles (OCC)	9
US Billboard Hot 100	18
US Hot Soul Singles (Billboard)	2
US Adult Contemporary (Billboard)	33
US Cash Box Top 100	12

=== Year-end charts ===
Chart (1978)	Position
Canada Top Singles (RPM)	81
US Billboard Hot 100	75
US Cash Box Top 100	99

== Luther Vandross version ==
"Always and Forever"

Single by Luther Vandross

from the album Songs
- Released: 8 November 1994
- Genre: R&B
- Length: 4:53
- Label: Epic
- Songwriter: Rod Temperton
- Producers: Walter Afanasieff; Luther Vandross

Luther Vandross singles chronology
"Endless Love" (1994)	"Always and Forever" (1994)	"Love the One You're With/Going in Circles" (1995)

Music video
- "Always and Forever (Live)" on YouTube

American R&B/soul singer-songwriter Luther Vandross released his cover of "Always and Forever" as the second single from his ninth album, Songs (1994). His recording earned him a Grammy Award nomination in the category Best Male R&B Vocal performance at the 37th Annual Grammy Awards in 1995 and placed on four US Billboard charts, with its best showing on the R&B chart, where it reached number 16. Vandross's single made the Cash Box Top 100 at number 33 and the Billboard Hot 100 at number 58. It also appeared on the Billboard Adult Contemporary and Rhythmic Top 40 charts.

=== Critical reception ===
Larry Flick from Billboard magazine described the song as "a faithful rendition of a romantic standard". He added, "Layered with glorious strings and the golden input of producer Walter Afanasieff, single has the potential to go where his 'Endless Love' duet with Mariah Carey did not–right to the top of the Hot 100. His voice has rarely fit so well with a song intended for pop radio consumption." Steve Baltin from Cash Box stated, "Despite the challenge of young guns on the r&b charts and big-name stars on the pop charts, Luther's new album Songs, made up of covers, has been a big crossover hit. [...] This remake of an r&b classic should keep the fire burning, as Vandross gives the song the treatment, exploding at the climax. Big on A.C. and urban, with some top 40 appeal." In his weekly UK chart commentary, James Masterton felt "it never was the most exciting of records and Luther does little to add to this."

=== Track listing ===
- US, UK – CD single
1. "Always and Forever" (Radio Edit) – 4:00
2. "Searching" – 8:02
3. "The Glow of Love" – 6:11
4. "Always and Forever" (Live) – 5:03

=== Charts ===
Chart (1995)	Peak position
Canada Top Singles (RPM)	74
Canada Adult Contemporary (RPM)	41
Scotland (OCC)	28
UK Singles (OCC)	20
US Billboard Hot 100	58
US Rhythmic (Billboard)	37
US Hot R&B Singles (Billboard)	16
US Adult Contemporary (Billboard)	25
US Cash Box Top 100	33

== Other significant cover versions ==
Among many artists who have recorded versions of "Always and Forever" is the American R&B vocal group Whistle, who released their single in April 1990 from their album of the same name. Their version of the song peaked at number nine on the Billboard R&B chart and number 35 on the Billboard Hot 100.

American pop singer Johnny Mathis recorded the song for his 2008 compilation album, A Night to Remember.
