= Give Me the Night (album) =

Studio album by George Benson
- Released: August 9, 1980
- Recorded: 1980
- Studios: Cherokee Studios (Hollywood, California); Kendun Recorders (Burbank, California)
- Genres: Soul; funk; jazz; R&B
- Length: 42:21
- Labels: Warner Bros.; Qwest
- Producer: Quincy Jones

George Benson chronology
Livin' Inside Your Love (1979)	Give Me the Night (1980)	The George Benson Collection (1981)

Singles from Give Me the Night
- 1. "Give Me the Night" Released: June 1980; 2. "Love X Love" Released: September 1980; 3. "What's on Your Mind" Released: 1980; 4. "Turn Out the Lamplight" Released: 1980

Give Me the Night is a 1980 album by American jazz guitarist and singer George Benson.

Producer Quincy Jones released the album on his start-up label Qwest Records, in conjunction with Warner Bros. Records.

== Reception ==
Professional ratings
Review scores
Source	Rating
AllMusic	5/5 stars
The Rolling Stone Jazz Record Guide	3/5 stars

Give Me the Night charted at number one on both the Top Soul Albums and Jazz Albums charts, as well as number three on the Billboard Pop Albums charts. It was certified Platinum by the RIAA two months after its release.

The album's success was closely associated with its title track lead single, which rose to the top spot on the Soul Singles chart.

The album earned Benson three wins at the 1981 Grammy Awards, including Best Male R&B Vocal Performance, while "Moody's Mood" received Best Jazz Vocal Performance, Male and "Off Broadway" received Best R&B Instrumental Performance. Quincy Jones and Jerry Hey also won the Grammy Award for Best Instrumental Arrangement for "Dinorah, Dinorah." Bruce Swedien was nominated for the Grammy Award for Best Engineered Album, Non-Classical, while Quincy Jones was nominated for the Grammy Award for Producer of the Year, Non-Classical in-part for his work on this album.

== Track listing ==
Side one

1. "Love X Love" (Rod Temperton) – 4:45
2. "Off Broadway" (Temperton) – 5:23
3. "Moody's Mood" (Eddie Jefferson, James Moody) – 3:24 (featuring Patti Austin)
4. "Give Me the Night" (Temperton) – 5:01

Side two

1. "What's on Your Mind" (Glen Ballard, Kerry Chater) – 4:02
2. "Dinorah, Dinorah" (Ivan Lins, Vitor Martins) – 3:39
3. "Love Dance" (Ivan Lins, Gilson Peranzzetta, Paul Williams) – 3:18
4. "Star of a Story (X)" (Temperton) – 4:42 (*)
5. "Midnight Love Affair" (David "Hawk" Wolinski) – 3:31
6. "Turn Out the Lamplight" (Temperton) – 4:43 (**)

(*) Originally recorded in 1978 as "The Star of a Story" by Heatwave, of which Temperton was a member.

(**) Originally recorded in 1976 by Heatwave.

== Personnel ==
Musicians

- George Benson – guitar (1–5, 8–10), lead vocals (1, 4, 5, 7–10), vocals (3), lead guitar (6), scat vocals (6)
- Greg Phillinganes – keyboards (1–3, 10), synthesizers (2, 3), Fender Rhodes (6)
- Herbie Hancock – electric piano (4), synthesizer (6–9), synthesizer programming (6, 8, 9), Fender Rhodes (7, 8)
- Michael Boddicker – synthesizer (4, 5, 8)
- Richard Tee – synthesizer bass (4), electric piano (5), synthesizer (8–10)
- Clare Fischer – acoustic piano (6), Fender Rhodes (6), Yamaha YC-30 (6)
- George Duke – keyboards (9)
- Lee Ritenour – guitar (2, 4, 5, 8, 9), acoustic guitar (7), electric guitar (10)
- Louis Johnson – bass (1, 2, 6, 10)
- Abraham Laboriel – bass (1, 3–5, 7–9)
- John Robinson – drums (1–6, 8, 10)
- Carlos Vega – drums (7, 9)
- Paulinho da Costa – percussion (1, 2, 4–8, 10)
- Kim Hutchcroft – saxophone (1, 2, 4–6, 9), flute (1, 2, 4–6, 9)
- Larry Williams – saxophone (1, 2, 4–6, 9), flute (1, 2, 4–6, 9)
- Jerry Hey – trumpet (1, 2, 4–6, 9)
- Sid Sharp – string concertmaster (1–6, 8)
- Patti Austin – backing vocals (1, 4, 6, 8, 10), vocal solo (3), vocals (9)
- Tom Bahler – backing vocals (1, 4, 8, 10)
- Jocelyn Brown – backing vocals (1, 4, 8)
- Jim Gilstrap – backing vocals (1, 4, 8)
- Diva Gray – backing vocals (1, 4, 8)

Music arrangements

- Jerry Hey – horn arrangements (1, 2, 4–6, 9), string arrangements (1, 2, 4–6), synthesizer arrangements (9)
- Rod Temperton – rhythm arrangements (1, 2, 4), vocal arrangements (1, 4)
- David Foster – string arrangements (1), synthesizer arrangements (9)
- Quincy Jones – rhythm arrangements (2–10), vocal arrangements (5, 8, 9), synthesizer arrangements (8)
- Marty Paich – string arrangements and conductor (3, 8)
- Lee Ritenour – rhythm arrangements (7)
- Tom Bahler – BGV arrangements (10)

=== Production ===
- Quincy Jones – producer, liner notes
- Bruce Swedien – recording, mixing
- Sheridan Eldridge – assistant engineer
- Ralph Osborn – assistant engineer
- Mark Sackett – assistant engineer
- Kent Duncan – mastering at Kendun Recorders
- Richard Seireeni – art direction
- Norman Seeff – cover photography
- Paul Jasmin – photo illustration
- Peter Brill – sleeve photography
- Charlie Wild Studio – additional illustration
- Andersen Typographics – typography
- Ken Fritz and Dennis Turner for Ken Fritz Management – management

== Charts ==
=== Weekly charts ===
Chart performance for Give Me the Night
Chart (1980–1981)	Peak position
Australian Albums (Kent Music Report)	9
Canada Top Albums/CDs (RPM)	19
Dutch Albums (Album Top 100)	18
New Zealand Albums (RMNZ)	2
Norwegian Albums (VG-lista)	8
Swedish Albums (Sverigetopplistan)	30
UK Albums (Official Charts)	3
US Billboard 200	3
US Top R&B/Hip-Hop Albums (Billboard)	1

=== Year-end charts ===
Year-end chart performance for Give Me the Night
Chart (1980)	Position
Australian Albums (Kent Music Report)	37
New Zealand Albums (RMNZ)	10
Norwegian Albums (VG-lista)	49
UK Albums (OCC)	18

== Certifications ==
Certifications for Give Me the Night
Region	Certification	Certified units/sales
Australia (ARIA)	Platinum	50,000^{^}
Japan	—	74,750
New Zealand (RMNZ)	Platinum	15,000^{^}
United Kingdom (BPI)	Platinum	300,000^{^}
United States (RIAA)	Platinum	1,000,000^{^}
^{^} Shipments figures based on certification alone.
