= One More Chance (Diana Ross song) =

Single by Diana Ross

from the album To Love Again
- B-side: "After You"
- Released: February 27, 1981
- Genre: Pop
- Songwriters: Gerry Goffin; Michael Masser
- Producer: Michael Masser

Diana Ross singles chronology
"It's My Turn" (1980)	"One More Chance" (1981)	"Cryin' My Heart Out for You" (1981)

"One More Chance" is a song recorded by American singer Diana Ross. The song was written by Gerry Goffin and Michael Masser (also producer). It was released as a single on February 27, 1981 by Motown Records to promote the compilation album To Love Again (1981). The song reached number 79 on the Billboard Hot 100 and number 54 on the Hot Soul Singles.

== Critical reception ==
Billboard noted that this sensual ballad contains Ross' distinctive vocals and a smooth, juicy arrangement in the spirit of "It's My Turn." Cash Box called the track the unexplored gem of the album To Love Again.

== Charts ==
Chart performance for "One More Chance"
Chart (1981)	Peak position
UK Singles (OCC)	49
US Billboard Hot 100	79
US Hot Soul Singles (Billboard)	54
