= Brandon Block =

British club DJ

- Also known as: Blocko
- Born: 26 November 1967 (age 58); London, England
- Genres: Disc jockey; remixer; record producer
- Years active: 1988–present
- Website: brandonblock.com

Brandon Block (born 26 November 1967) is a British club DJ, producer and remixer. He has appeared on reality shows like Celebrity Come Dine with Me and Celebrity Big Brother. He is well known for appearing on stage heavily intoxicated at the 2000 BRIT Awards. Friends suggested that he had entered a musical contest and had won Best Musician of the Year, when in fact he had not even been nominated for the award. This resulted in a confrontation with award presenters Ronnie Wood and Thora Birch.

== Early life ==
Block was born in London. At the age of four, he moved to Wembley along with his mother, who still lives there today. Block's career started out in 1985 at the John Lyon pub in Harrow, Middlesex. According to Block himself, "My friends and I used to buy a lot of funk and soul (the sound at the time) and one night the DJ there didn't show, so me and my then DJ Lewis asked the governor if we could bring the records down and do it. We were so good that he fired the DJ. In fact, it got so popular that they started charging an entrance fee".

== Life and career ==
His first club residency was in 1988, at ZigZag at the Broadway Boulevard in Ealing, West London. Whilst there, he met Dean Thatcher (best known as a founder member of techno/house act The Aloof) and started up his own night called Haven Stables, which ran until 1991. The previous year, he went to Ibiza for the first time with the record label he was working for at the time. During his time, he has also held residencies at Up Yer Ronson in Leeds, FUBAR at the Milk Bar in London, Club For Life in London, and Scream in Plymouth. He has also played numerous other venues such as the Ministry of Sound, Turnmills, Miss Moneypenny's, Republica, Progress, Karanga and Colours. Several appearances on BBC Radio 1's Essential Mix show appeared.

In 1996, Block was experiencing problems in his private life. His lifestyle was taking its toll on his health. He then sought help and, in October 1996, entered the Capio Nightingale Hospital in Lisson Grove, where he met the man he credits with saving his life.

In 2009, Block agreed to take part in an anti-drugs campaign for the government. He revealed that back in 1996 he had picked up various illnesses and said that doctors had told him to change his life immediately – otherwise, he would have "two weeks to live" Speaking in 1997 about this, he said of detox: "It's been hard. You have to make a decision. Make it and then there’s no going back." He now has undertaken numerous training courses including City & Guilds in Health & Social Care, Smart Recovery (Train the Trainer), Life Coaching, Goal Mapping Practitioner, Stress Management Society (Train the Trainer) to date.

From 2010 until 2015, he worked with Blenheim the London drug and alcohol treatment service as a project worker. From January 2016, he took on a job as a project worker for the NHS, working with people who have multiple complex needs. This was a 12 month pilot which received rave reviews. From 2017 to the present day, he has been showcasing inspirational people who have made dramatic and significant changes in the face of adversity, via Facebook live interviews and by using his Facebook page creation 'Happy Days for Everyone'. He now works as a Stress Management and Goal Mapping Coach with various agencies and services to improve peoples lives and raise awareness around mental health issues.

During detox, he was forced to take six months off from the DJ circuit in 1996. As his health improved the following year, so did his fortunes. In October 1997, he became a radio presenter alongside his old friend Alex P, presenting a show on Kiss 100. Later, he had three singles released under his Blockster alias – "Something Goin' On", "Grooveline" and "You Should Be..", all of which were released by Ministry of Sound. His version of the Bee Gees' "You Should Be Dancing" reached number 3 on the UK Singles Chart in January 1999, and his version of Heatwave's "The Groove Line" reached number 18 in July 1999.

In 2005, he appeared on the chatshow Heads Up with Richard Herring to discuss his life, career, antisemitism, and his love of poker.

In September 2006, Block was on Five's reality television show Trust Me - I'm a Holiday Rep. He formerly, between 2000 and 2001, presented Brandon Block's Brits which also had a Jordan's Top Tips, on Rapture TV.

On 13 January 2007, Block appeared on The Weakest Link Music Extravaganza Edition. He was the second to be voted off.

Block also hosted a show alongside fellow DJ and friend Alex P on MTV Dance, where they toured Ibiza interviewing clubbers from around the island, and played the latest dance videos.

On 21 June 2012, Block featured as the entertainment for one of the guests on Channel 4's Come Dine with Me.

On 3 January 2017, Block entered the Celebrity Big Brother house. He voluntarily left the house on Day 10.
