= To Love Again (Diana Ross album) =

Compilation album by Diana Ross
- Released: February 17, 1981
- Recorded: 1973–1981
- Genre: Soul, R&B
- Length: 33:11
- Label: Motown
- Producer: Michael Masser

Diana Ross chronology
| Diana (1980) | To Love Again (1981) | All the Great Hits (1981) |

Singles from To Love Again
- 1. "It's My Turn" Released: September 29, 1980; 2. "One More Chance" Released: February 27, 1981; 3. "Cryin' My Heart Out for You/"To Love Again"" Released: March 21, 1981

To Love Again is an album by American singer Diana Ross, released on February 17, 1981 by Motown Records. It featured both new recordings and previously released material. The album was produced by Michael Masser. It reached number 32 in the USA (#16 R&B) and sold around 900,000 copies worldwide.

== Overview ==
Following the success of 1980's Diana, produced by Chic, Motown released this set in early 1981 consisting of old and newly recorded love songs by Ross and Masser.

"It's My Turn" was the main theme from a 1980 movie starring Michael Douglas and Jill Clayburgh and had been released both on the soundtrack album and as a single prior to the To Love Again compilation, becoming a top ten hit on the Billboard Hot 100. Two of the three new recordings, "One More Chance" and "Cryin' My Heart Out for You", were also issued as singles. The final new recording, "Stay With Me", was previously recorded by Roberta Flack in 1979. Teddy Pendergrass would also record "Stay With Me" for his 1984 album Love Language.

All tracks on side 2 of the original vinyl were previously released archive recordings by Ross and Masser from the 1970s.

To Love Again was to be Ross' last album of new material for Motown (before her return in 1989) after signing a $20 million contract with RCA.

In 2003 Motown/Universal Music re-released the album doubling the number of tracks with a range of assorted ballads from her back catalogue. Two of the tracks, "We're Always Saying Goodbye" and "Share Some Love", had been previously unreleased. It also marked the first time many of the songs appeared on compact disc.

Professional ratings
Review scores
| Source | Rating |
|---|---|
| Allmusic | 3/5 stars |

== Track listing ==
=== Original album ===
Side One

1. "It's My Turn" (Masser, Sager) - 3:58
  - From the 1980 original motion picture soundtrack It's My Turn
2. "Stay with Me" (Goffin, Masser) - 3:43
  - 1981 recording
3. "One More Chance" (Goffin, Masser) - 4:24
  - 1981 recording
4. "Cryin' My Heart Out for You" (Masser, Willis) - 3:49
  - 1981 recording

Side Two

1. "Theme from Mahogany (Do You Know Where You're Going To)" (Goffin, Masser) - 3:26
  - From the 1975 original motion picture soundtrack Mahogany and 1976 album Diana Ross
2. "I Thought It Took a Little Time (But Today I Fell in Love)" (Masser, Sawyer) - 3:27
  - From the 1976 album Diana Ross
3. "To Love Again" (1981 Mix) (Goffin, Masser) - 4:08
  - From the 1978 album Ross. Originally recorded for Mahogany OST sessions, 1975
4. "No One's Gonna Be a Fool Forever" (Masser, Sawyer) - 3:24
  - From the 1973 album Last Time I Saw Him
5. "Touch Me in the Morning" (Single mix, with a short fade as opposed to the 30-second fadeout of the original) (Masser, Miller) - 3:26
  - From the 1973 album Touch Me in the Morning

=== 2003 edition ===
1. "It's My Turn" (Masser, Sager) - 3:58
2. "Stay with Me" (Goffin, Masser) - 3:43
3. "One More Chance" (Goffin, Masser) - 4:24
4. "Cryin' My Heart Out for You" (Masser, Willis) - 3:49
5. "Theme from Mahogany (Do You Know Where You're Going To)" (Single mix) (Goffin, Masser) - 3:26
6. "I Thought It Took a Little Time (But Today I Fell in Love)" (Masser, Sawyer) - 3:27
7. "To Love Again" (1978 Mix) (Goffin, Masser) - 4:11
8. "No One's Gonna Be a Fool Forever" (Single mix) (Masser, Sawyer) - 3:21
9. "Touch Me in the Morning" (Masser, Miller) - 3:58
10. "Love Me" (Baird, Fekaris, Zesses) - 2:55
  - From Last Time I Saw Him
11. "Stop, Look, Listen (To Your Heart)" (Alternate mix created for this edition) (Duet with Marvin Gaye) (T. Bell, Creed) - 2:58
  - From the 1973 album Diana & Marvin
12. "Together" (Single mix) (Masser, Sawyer) - 3:18
  - 1975 non-album single B-side. Remixed version included on Ross
13. "After You" (Masser, Miller) - 4:13
  - From Mahogany and Diana Ross
14. "Too Shy to Say" (Wonder) - 3:17
  - From the 1977 album Baby It's Me
15. "Come In from the Rain" (Manchester, Sager) - 4:02
  - From Baby It's Me
16. "Never Say I Don't Love You" (Patterson, Wright) - 3:53
  - From Ross
17. "Share Some Love" (Patterson, Wright) - 4:07
  - Previously unreleased recording
18. "Dreaming of You" (Duet with Lionel Richie) (McClary, Richie) - 4:34
  - From the 1981 original motion picture soundtrack Endless Love
19. "Endless Love" (Duet with Lionel Richie) (Richie) - 4:28
  - From Endless Love OST
20. "We're Always Saying Goodbye" (Etlinger, Miller) - 2:31
  - Previously unreleased recording

== Charts ==
=== Album ===
| Chart (1981) | Peak position |
|---|---|
| Dutch Albums (Album Top 100) | 39 |
| Finnish Albums (Suomen virallinen lista) | 9 |
| German Albums (Offizielle Top 100) | 62 |
| Norwegian Albums (VG-lista) | 17 |
| Swedish Albums (Sverigetopplistan) | 35 |
| UK Albums (OCC) | 26 |
| US Billboard 200 | 32 |
| US Cashbox Top Pop Albums | 24 |

=== Singles ===
| Single | Chart | Position |
|---|---|---|
| "It's My Turn" | US Billboard Hot 100 | 9 |
| "It's My Turn" | USA Billboard Hot Soul Singles | 14 |
| "It's My Turn" | UK Singles Chart | 16 |
| "One More Chance" | US Billboard Hot 100 | 79 |
| "One More Chance" | US Billboard Hot Soul Singles | 39 |
| "One More Chance" | UK Singles Chart | 49 |
| "Crying My Heart Out for You" | UK Singles Chart | 58 |
| "To Love Again" | Cash Box Looking Ahead | 103 |
