= All I Am (Lynsey de Paul and Susan Sheridan song) =

1980 song performed by Lynsey de Paul

"All I Am" is a song written by Lynsey de Paul and Susan Sheridan. It was first released as an album track on Candles, the 1980 Billboard charting album from the soul group, Heatwave. Band member Johnnie Wilder, Jr. revealed that he invited de Paul to contribute the track. It was also released as the B-side to the Heatwave single "Dreamin' You" released in 1980 in Australia. This version has also been released on the Heatwave compilation album Maximum Heat, as well as on the compilation albums The Love Box II: 75 Love Song Sensations, Hits of the Year 3, Greatest Slow Legendary and Do You Remember This. In 2010, it was released as a track on the expanded and remastered CD version of Candles. It ranked number 7 in the Indonesian top 100 "JazzyTunes songs" chart and was included on the album Young Generation Jazz Vocal Jazz (The Best Of Jazzy Hits 1981).

A version of the song was also released as a track on the January 1981 Marti Webb album, Won't Change Places, which also featured another Lynsey de Paul/Susan Sheridan song "What You Gonna Do With Your Freedom". Both of the songs were produced by de Paul. "All I Am" was released as a single by Webb in South Africa on the Polydor label and was backed with "Won't Change Places".

The former lead singer of Heatwave, Johnnie Wilder, Jr. recorded a new version of "All I Am" on his 1996 solo album One More Day. The Indonesian artist Yana Julio, also covered the song and it appeared on his 1998 album, Kucinta and the track was released as a single, accompanied by an official video directed by Jose Poernomo. In 2007, Indonesian Jazz and R&D singer Lala Suwages released her version of the song on her album, Devoted To You. An instrumental version of the song was also the title track of jazz pianist Bubi Chen's album, released in 1997.

The music from "All I Am", formed the basis for the Buddha Monk song "Dedicated", that appeared on his 1998 Billboard charting album The Prophecy; de Paul and Sheridan received co-writing credits on the song. The song was also included on the 2005 album, The Prophecy Revisited. "All I Am" was also sampled on the 2006 song "Treat Me Right" by German DJ Syncopix, as well as on the track "When I Get There" by DJ Wich and Rasco feat. Hi-Def on the album, The Untouchables – Al Capone's Vault.

Although de Paul never released her version of the song, she did perform it on Ladybirds, the Channel 4 television program about her life in music.
