= What's on Your Mind (George Benson song) =

"What's On Your Mind"

Single by George Benson

from the album Give Me the Night
- Released: 1980
- Genre: R&B
- Length: 4:02
- Label: Warner Bros.
- Songwriters: Glen Ballard, Kerry Chater
- Producer: Quincy Jones

George Benson singles chronology
"Love X Love" (1980)	"What's On Your Mind" (1980)	"Turn Out the Lamplight" (1980)

"What's on Your Mind" is a single by American R&B singer George Benson, which entered the UK Singles Chart on 7 February 1981. It reached a peak position of number 45, and remained on the chart for 5 weeks.
