= It's My Turn (song) =

Single by Diana Ross

from the album To Love Again
- B-side: "Sleepin'"
- Released: September 29, 1980
- Genre: Pop; R&B
- Length: 3:57
- Label: Motown
- Songwriters: Carole Bayer Sager; Michael Masser
- Producer: Michael Masser

Diana Ross singles chronology
"My Old Piano" (1980)	"It's My Turn" (1980)	"One More Chance" (1981)

"It's My Turn" is a song sung by American singer Diana Ross as the theme to the film It's My Turn (1980). With lyrics written by Carole Bayer Sager, and Michael Masser composing and producing, the song was released on September 29, 1980 by Motown as the lead single from the film's soundtrack of the same name as the song and its parent movie. It was also the first single on Ross's compilation, To Love Again (1981). In the United States, the single peaked at number 9 on both the Billboard Hot 100 and Adult Contemporary charts, and it rose to number 14 on the Soul chart.

== Chart performance ==
Chart (1980–1981)	Peak position
Australia (Kent Music Report)	97
Ireland (IRMA)	17
Luxembourg (Radio Luxembourg)	13
Netherlands	31
South Africa (Springbok)	15
UK Singles Chart	16
US Billboard Hot 100	9
US Adult Contemporary (Billboard)	9
US Hot Soul Singles (Billboard)	14

Year-end chart (1981)	Rank
US Top Pop Singles (Billboard)	42
