= GTO Records =

British record label (1974–1981)

- Parent company: CBS Records (from 1978)
- Founded: 1974
- Genre: Pop, Rock, Disco, Hi-NRG
- Country of origin: United Kingdom

GTO Records was a British record label which released many hits during the 1970s. It ran from 1974 to 1981 and mainly concentrated on pop music and disco. The acronym represented the Gem Toby Organization.

== Background ==
The record label was co-founded by Bell Records UK's Dick Leahy and Gem Records's Laurence Myers in 1974, after Myers had set up GTO Films and Arcade Records in the period between 1972 and 1974. The first GTO release – on June 28th 1974 was Scott Fitzgerald - “Judy Played The Jukebox” (Gt 1) and the second release, on July 5th 1974, was the single "Up in a Puff of Smoke" by Polly Brown (GT 2) and the label's focus would remain on pop and disco acts such as Billy Ocean, The Dooleys and Heatwave, and released Donna Summer's albums in the UK, all of which proved to be successful. Lulu also briefly recorded for the label. The biggest hit released by the label was Donna Summer's "I Feel Love", which reached No.1 in 1977.

In 1978, the label was sold to CBS Records after achieving a high level of hits for a new label. From this time, the Donna Summer records moved to Casablanca Records, while the hits for other acts began to dry up over the next two years. The label was wrapped up in late 1981 when its roster of acts were either dropped or moved on to Epic Records – also owned by CBS. Prior to the sale and transfer of artists, Epic distributed many GTO albums, including Heatwave's output.

The GTO back catalogue is currently owned by Sony Music.

== Hit singles ==
Top 40 singles

- "Only You Can" – Fox (1975 UK #3)
- "Imagine Me Imagine You" – Fox (1975 UK #15)
- "Play Me Like You Play Your Guitar" – Duane Eddy (1975 UK #9)
- "Please Tell Him That I Said Hello" – Dana (1975 UK #8)
- "It's Gonna Be a Cold Cold Christmas" – Dana (1975 UK #4)
- "No Regrets" – The Walker Brothers (1976 UK #7)
- "S-S-S-Single Bed" – Fox (1976 UK #4)
- "Never Gonna Fall in Love Again" – Dana (1976 UK #31)
- "Fairytale" – Dana (1976 UK#13)
- "Love Really Hurts Without You" – Billy Ocean (1976 UK #2)
- "L.O.D. (Love on Delivery)" – Billy Ocean (1976 UK #19)
- "Stop Me (If You've Heard it All Before)" – Billy Ocean (1976 UK #12)
- "Love to Love You Baby" – Donna Summer (1976 UK #4)
- "Winter Melody" – Donna Summer (1976 UK #27)
- "Red Light Spells Danger" – Billy Ocean (1977 UK #2)
- "I Feel Love" – Donna Summer (1977 UK #1)
- "I Remember Yesterday" – Donna Summer (1977 UK #14)
- "Love's Unkind" – Donna Summer (1977 UK #3)
- "Boogie Nights" – Heatwave (1977 UK #2)
- "Too Hot to Handle" – Heatwave (1977 UK #15)
- "I Can Prove It" – Tony Etoria (1977 UK #21)
- "Think I'm Gonna Fall in Love With You" – The Dooleys (1977 UK #13)
- "Georgina Bailey" Noosha Fox (1977 UK #31)
- "Love of My Life" – The Dooleys (1977 UK #9)
- "Back in Love Again" – Donna Summer (1978 UK #29))
- "The Groove Line" – Heatwave (1978 UK #12)
- "Mind Blowing Decisions" – Heatwave (1978 UK #12)
- "Always and Forever" – Heatwave (1978 UK #9)
- "A Rose Has to Die" – The Dooleys (1978 UK #11)
- "From East to West" – Voyage (1978 UK #13)
- "Honey I'm Lost" – The Dooleys (1979 UK #24)
- "Let's Fly Away" – Voyage (1979 UK #38)
- "Wanted" – The Dooleys (1979 UK #3)
- "The Chosen Few" – The Dooleys (1979 UK #7)
- "Love Patrol" – The Dooleys (1980 UK #29)
- "Living By Numbers" – New Musik (1980 UK #13)
- "This World of Water" – New Musik (1980 UK #31)
- "Sanctuary" – New Musik (1980 UK #31)
- "Gangsters of the Groove" – Heatwave (1981 UK #19)

== Hit albums ==
- Fox – Fox (1975 UK #7)
- No Regrets – The Walker Brothers (1976 UK #49)
- Love to Love You Baby – Donna Summer (1976 UK #16)
- A Love Trilogy – Donna Summer (1976 UK #41)
- Too Hot to Handle – Heatwave (1977 UK #46)
- I Remember Yesterday – Donna Summer (1977 UK #3)
- Central Heating – Heatwave (1978 UK #26)
- Greatest Hits – Donna Summer (1978 UK #4)
- Voyage – Voyage (1978 UK #59)
- The Best of The Dooleys – The Dooleys (1979 UK #6)
- The Chosen Few – The Dooleys (1979 UK #56)
- Full House – The Dooleys (1980 UK #54)
- From A to B – New Musik (1980 UK #35)
- Candles – Heatwave (1981 UK #29)
- Anywhere – New Musik (1981 UK #68)
