= The Groove Line =

Single by Heatwave

from the album Central Heating
- B-side: "Happiness Togetherness"
- Released: November 1977
- Genre: Disco, funk
- Length: 4:11 (7" single); 7:28 (12" single)
- Label: GTO
- Songwriter: Rod Temperton
- Producer: Barry Blue

Heatwave singles chronology
"Always and Forever" (1977)	"The Groove Line" (1977)	"Mind Blowing Decisions" (1978)

Alternative release(s)
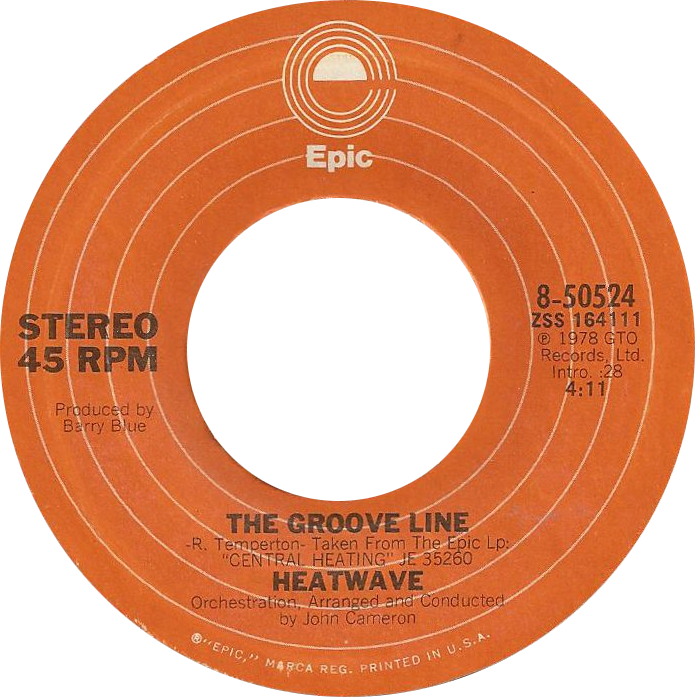
- Side A of US single

"The Groove Line" is a 1977 single by the Dayton, Ohio/European funk-disco group Heatwave. It was written by Rod Temperton. It was included on Heatwave's second album, Central Heating.

== History ==
The song charted at number 12 in the UK Singles Chart and number 7 in the Billboard Hot 100. It also appeared on US Billboard R&B at number 3. The single was certified Platinum by the RIAA in 2001. It is ranked as the 49th biggest US hit of 1978.

== Chart performance ==
=== Weekly charts ===
Chart (1978)	Peak position
Canada RPM Top Singles	31
France (IFOP)	10
Ireland (IRMA)	5
Netherlands	45
New Zealand (RIANZ)	35
UK Singles Chart	12
US Billboard Hot 100	7
US Billboard Hot Soul Singles	3
US Cash Box Top 100	10

=== Year-end charts ===
Chart (1978)	Rank
U.S. Billboard Hot 100	49
U.S. Cash Box	85

=== Sales and certifications ===
Region	Certification	Certified units/sales
United States (RIAA)	Platinum	1,000,000^{^}
^{^} Shipments figures based on certification alone.

== Blockster version ==
In 1999, British DJ Blockster released a cover of the song, titled "Grooveline". It reached No. 18 on the UK Singles Chart and No. 2 on the UK Dance Singles Chart in July 1999.

== Sampling ==
The song was sampled by hip hop group Public Enemy in their song "Sophisticated Bitch" for their 1987 album Yo! Bum Rush the Show.
