= Boogie Nights (song) =

1977 single by Heatwave

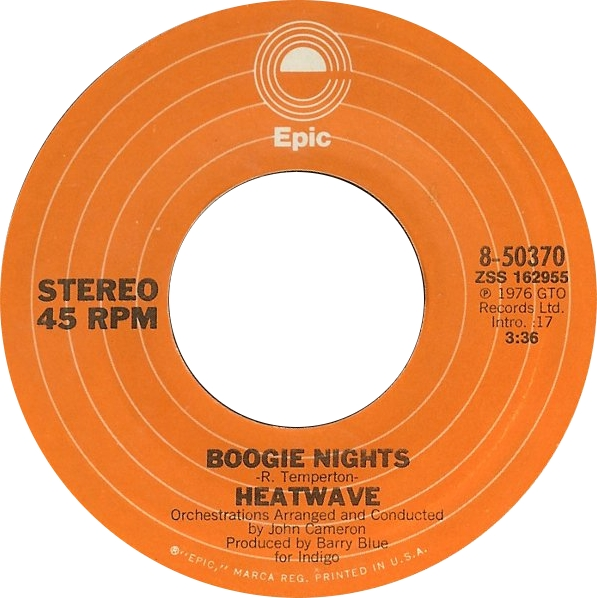
- US 7-inch vinyl single

Single by Heatwave

from the album Too Hot to Handle
- B-side: "All You Do Is Dial"
- Released: June 1977
- Recorded: 1976
- Genre: Disco
- Length: 3:36 (single edit); 5:02 (album version)
- Label: GTO; Epic (US)
- Songwriter: Rod Temperton
- Producer: Barry Blue

Heatwave singles chronology
"Super Soul Sister" (1976)	"Boogie Nights" (1977)	"Too Hot to Handle" (1977)

Official video
- "Boogie Nights" (Official HD Video) on YouTube

Alternative release
- One of side-A labels of the UK single

"Boogie Nights" is a 1977 single by international funk-disco group Heatwave. It was written by keyboardist Rod Temperton and was included on Heatwave's debut album, Too Hot to Handle.

== History ==
The song became one of the best-known disco songs by a British group and charted at no. 2 on the UK Singles Chart on 5 March 1977. In the US, "Boogie Nights" also peaked at no. 2 on the Billboard Hot 100. It appeared on US Billboard R&B and dance charts during 1977.The single was certified Platinum by the Recording Industry Association of America (RIAA). "Boogie Nights" also reached no. 1 in New Zealand.

The song made an appearance in the films Eyes of Laura Mars, Summer of Sam and The Stud, though it was not featured in the 1997 film titled after it: Boogie Nights. Apparently the group's co-lead singer, Johnnie Wilder Jr., a devout born-again Christian, refused to allow the use of the recording in the film because the song was about dancing, not pornography, while the film was about the latter.

Aaron Judge, right-fielder for the New York Yankees, uses the song as his walk-up.

== Production ==
The producer, Barry Blue, brought in arranger John Cameron to work on the track. Carla Skanger (a pseudonym of Sheila Bromberg of the London Symphony Orchestra) played harp and American actor and singer Clarke Peters performed backing vocals on the recording.

=== Personnel ===
- Johnnie Wilder Jr. – backing vocals, percussion
- Keith Wilder – lead vocals
- Eric Johns – guitars
- Rod Temperton – keyboards, synthesizer
- Mario Mantese – bass guitar
- Ernest "Bilbo" Berger – drums, percussion

== Charts and certifications ==
=== Weekly charts ===
Chart (1977–1978)	Peak position
Australia (Kent Music Report)	54
Belgium (Ultratop 50 Flanders)	27
Canada Top Singles (RPM)	2
Netherlands (Single Top 100)	17
New Zealand (RIANZ)	1
Norway (VG-lista)	6
Sweden (Sverigetopplistan)	11
UK Singles (OCC)	2
US Billboard Hot 100	2
US Disco Action (Billboard)	36
US Hot Soul Singles (Billboard)	5
US Cash Box Top 100	2
West Germany (GfK)	31

=== Year-end charts ===
Chart (1977)	Rank
Canada (RPM)	36
New Zealand (RIANZ)	1
UK	24
US Billboard Hot 100	93
US Cash Box Top 100	48

=== Sales and certifications ===
Region	Certification	Certified units/sales
Canada (Music Canada)	Gold	75,000^{^}
United Kingdom (BPI)	Silver	200,000^{^}
United States (RIAA)	Platinum	2,000,000^{^}
^{^} Shipments figures based on certification alone.

== Cover versions ==
"Boogie Nights" has been covered many times by artists such as Will to Power (1990), Sonia (1992), The Weather Girls (1995) and 911 (1999). British boy-band Blue also performed the tune in their live shows.

=== Sonia version ===
"Boogie Nights"

Single by Sonia

from the album Better the Devil You Know
- B-side: "My Light"
- Released: 31 August 1992
- Genre: Dance-pop
- Length: 3:40
- Label: Arista
- Songwriter: Rod Temperton
- Producers: Mark Taylor; Tracy Ackerman

Sonia singles chronology
"We’ve Got the Power" (1992)	"Boogie Nights" (1992)	"Better the Devil You Know" (1993)

In 1992, British singer Sonia recorded her take on the song, produced by Mark Taylor and Tracy Ackerman for her third studio album, Better the Devil You Know, in 1993. It was released in August 1992 by Arista Records and peaked at no. 30 on the UK Singles Chart in September. The single's B-side is "My Light", which also appears on the album.

Track listings

- Cassette and 7-inch single
1. "Boogie Nights" – 3:40
2. "My Light" – 3:55
- CD single
1. "Boogie Nights" – 3:40
2. "Boogie Nights" (extended mix) – 5:42
3. "My Light" – 3:55
- 12-inch single
1. "Boogie Nights" (extended mix) – 5:42
2. "Boogie Nights" (dub mix)
3. "My Light" – 3:55

Charts

Year (1992)	Peak position
UK Singles (OCC)	30
UK Dance (Music Week)	35
