= Rod Temperton =

English songwriter, producer and musician (1949–2016)

- Temperton in a 2006 BBC Television programme

Background information
- Also known as: The Invisible Man
- Born: Rodney Lynn Temperton; 9 October 1949; Cleethorpes, Lincolnshire, England
- Died: 25 September 2016 (aged 66) London, England
- Genres: Pop; disco; funk; soul
- Occupations: Songwriter; record producer; keyboardist
- Instruments: Keyboards; vocals
- Years active: 1974–2016
- Formerly of: Heatwave

Rodney Lynn Temperton (9 October 1949 – 25 September 2016) was an English musician, songwriter, and record producer.

Temperton was the keyboardist and principal songwriter for the 1970s funk band Heatwave, writing songs including "Star of a Story", "Always and Forever", "Boogie Nights", and "The Groove Line". After he was recruited by record producer Quincy Jones, Temperton wrote several hit songs for Jones' protégé Michael Jackson, including "Thriller", "Off the Wall", and "Rock with You". He also wrote songs for George Benson, including "Give Me the Night" and "Love X Love", along with Patti Austin and James Ingram's US number-one single "Baby, Come to Me", among others.

Temperton wrote the soundtrack for the 1986 film Running Scared. In 1991 he won a Grammy Award for Best Arrangement, Instrumental or A Cappella for Birdland.

== Biography ==
=== Early years ===
Rodney Lynn Temperton was born in Cleethorpes, Lincolnshire, on 9 October 1949. Interviewed for the BBC Radio 2 documentary The Invisible Man: the Rod Temperton Story, he said that he was a musician from an early age: "My father wasn't the kind of person who would read you a story before you went off to sleep. He used to put a transistor radio in the crib, right on the pillow, and I'd go to sleep listening to Radio Luxembourg, and I think that had an influence."

Temperton attended De Aston Grammar School, Market Rasen, Lincolnshire, and he formed a group for the school's music competitions. He was a drummer at this time. "I'd get in the living room with my snare drum and my cymbal and play along to the BBC test card, which was all kinds of music they'd be playing continuously." On leaving school, he started working as a fish filleter for Ross Frozen Foods in Grimsby, Lincolnshire.

=== Heatwave ===
Temperton soon became a full-time musician as a keyboard player, and played in several dance bands. This took him to Worms in Germany. In 1974, he answered an advert in Melody Maker for a keyboardist, placed by Johnnie Wilder Jr., and as a result, became a member of the pop, disco, and funk band: Heatwave, which Wilder was putting together at the time. "He was the first British guy that I had ever met personally. He spoke kind of funny but he had a good sense of humour and he was a very friendly guy. After meeting him and then seeing him play I kind of determined he was a good enough player and entertainer and I just knew he would fit in the group", said Wilder.

Temperton played Wilder tunes he had been composing: "I was very interested because we were doing a lot of cover tunes—we weren't doing a lot of original material." The songs provided material for 1976's Too Hot to Handle, including "Boogie Nights", which broke the band in the United Kingdom and the United States, and the ballad "Always and Forever"; both tracks were million-sellers in the US.

Despite the slick American sound, Temperton's working surroundings were still far from glamorous. Alan Kirk, a Yorkshire musician with Jimmy James and the Vagabonds who toured with Heatwave in the mid-1970s, remembered: "Always and Forever was written on a Wurlitzer piano at the side of a pile of pungent washing. Sorry to disappoint all the romantics." Producer Barry Blue recalled: "He had a very small flat, so everything had to be done within one room and he had piles of washing, and had the TV on top of the organ. It was a nightmare [...] he had trams running outside [...] but he made it: he just absorbed himself in the music and Rod seemed to come up with these amazing songs."

In 1977, Heatwave followed up the success of its first album with its second, Central Heating, with Barry Blue again producing and Temperton behind most of the songs. It included "The Groove Line", another international hit single. In 1978, Temperton decided to concentrate on writing, and left Heatwave, though he continued to write for the band.

=== Songs written for Michael Jackson ===
Temperton's work attracted the attention of Quincy Jones, and he asked his engineer Bruce Swedien to check out the Heatwave album. "Holy cow! I simply loved Rod's musical feeling. Everything about it—Rod's arrangements, his tunes, his songs—was exceedingly hip", Swedien said, calling Temperton "the most disciplined pop music composer I've ever met. When he comes to the studio, every musical detail is written down or accounted for in Rod's mind. He never stops until he feels confident that the music we're working on is able to stand on its own." In 1979, Jones recruited Temperton to write for Off the Wall, Michael Jackson's first solo album in four years and his first full-fledged solo release for Epic Records. Temperton wrote three songs for the album, including "Rock with You", which was the album's second US No. 1 single.

In the early 1980s, Temperton left Germany and moved to Beverly Hills, California. In 1982, he wrote three songs, including the title track, for Jackson's next LP Thriller, which became the biggest-selling album of all time in the US, selling 32 million copies. Temperton also wrote the song's spoken-word section for Vincent Price. Of the title "Thriller", Temperton said:

I went back to the hotel, wrote two or three hundred titles and came up with Midnight Man. The next morning, I woke up and I just said this word. Something in my head just said, 'This is the title'. You could visualise it at the top of the Billboard charts. You could see the merchandising for this one word, how it jumped off the page as 'Thriller'.

=== Other songwriting successes ===
Temperton wrote for other musicians, his hits including disco classic "Stomp!" for the Brothers Johnson; George Benson's "Give Me the Night"; "Baby, Come to Me" for Patti Austin and James Ingram; "Love Is in Control (Finger on the Trigger)" for Donna Summer; and "Yah Mo B There" for James Ingram and Michael McDonald. Temperton also wrote for Herbie Hancock, the Manhattan Transfer, Mica Paris, Rufus and Chaka Khan, Karen Carpenter, and many others.

=== Film work ===
In 1979, Temperton and Barry Blue co-wrote the song "Keep Tomorrow for Me". Heatwave performed it on the soundtrack for the film Escape to Athena.

In 1982, Temperton wrote the music to "Someone in the Dark", recorded by Michael Jackson, and produced by Quincy Jones, for the film E.T. the Extra-Terrestrial, with lyrics by Alan and Marilyn Bergman.

In 1986, Temperton was nominated for the Academy Award for Best Original Song for "Miss Celie's Blues (Sister)", which he wrote with Quincy Jones and Lionel Richie for the film The Color Purple. (Richie won the award for "Say You, Say Me", from White Nights.) He was also nominated for Best Original Score, along with the 11 other composers, including Jones, who worked on The Color Purple's soundtrack.

Later in 1986, the buddy cop film Running Scared was released, featuring five new songs by Temperton, including "Sweet Freedom", performed by Michael McDonald, and "Man Size Love", performed by Klymaxx. Temperton also wrote the film's score.

== Personal life and death ==
After leaving Heatwave to concentrate on his songwriting, Temperton shunned the celebrity lifestyle and remained a very private man. Due to his low profile, Temperton was nicknamed "The Invisible Man". He died in London on 25 September 2016, at the age of 66, after "a brief aggressive battle with cancer" as described by Jon Platt of Warner/Chappell music publishing. His death would be announced a week later on 5 October 2016, with his private funeral having already taken place. Gilles Peterson, a BBC radio presenter, paid tribute to Temperton on Twitter: "Apart from Lennon and McCartney no one from the UK has written more gold plated songs than Sir Rod Temperton... a huge loss. RIP."

Temperton is survived by his wife Kathy. They had homes in Los Angeles, the south of France, Fiji, Switzerland and Kent in southeast England.

== Songwriting credits ==
Year	Song	First charted by	Credited co-writer(s) with Temperton	US Pop	US R&B	UK Singles Chart	Other charting versions, and notes
1977	"Boogie Nights"	Heatwave		2	5	2	1992: Sonia, no.30 UK
1977	"Too Hot to Handle" / "Slip Your Disc to This"	Heatwave		–	–	15	
1978	"Always and Forever"	Heatwave		18	2	9	1985: Nicole, no.66 US R&B; 1990: Whistle, no.9 US R&B; 1994: Luther Vandross, no.58 US pop, no.16 US R&B, no.20 UK
1978	"The Groove Line"	Heatwave		7	3	12	1999: The Blockster, no.18 UK
1979	"Eyeballin'"	Heatwave		–	30	–	
1979	"Razzle Dazzle"	Heatwave		–	–	43	
1979	"Keep Tomorrow For Me"	Heatwave	Barry Blue	-	-	-	
1979	"Rock with You"	Michael Jackson		1	1	7	1996: Quincy Jones, no.74 US R&B; 1998: D'Influence, no.30 UK; 2006: Michael Jackson, no.15 UK (re-entry); 2009: Michael Jackson, no.54 UK (2nd re-entry)
1979	"Off the Wall"	Michael Jackson		10	5	7	2000: Wisdome, no.33 UK; 2009: Michael Jackson, no.73 UK (re-entry)
1979	"Burn This Disco Out"	Michael Jackson		–	–	–	
1979	"Live In Me"	Rufus and Chaka Khan		–	–	–	
1980	"Stomp!"	The Brothers Johnson	Louis Johnson, George Johnson, Valerie Johnson	7	1	6	1996: Quincy Jones, no.28 UK
1980	"Light Up the Night"	The Brothers Johnson	Louis Johnson, George Johnson	–	16	47	
1980	"Give Me the Night"	George Benson		4	1	7	1984: Mirage, no.49 UK; 1996: Randy Crawford, no.47 US R&B, no.60 UK
1980	"Treasure"	The Brothers Johnson		73	36	–	
1980	"Love X Love"	George Benson		61	9	10	
1980	"Off Broadway"	George Benson		–	–	–	Grammy Best R&B Instrumental Performance
1980	"Gangsters of the Groove"	Heatwave		110	21	19	
1980	"Turn Out the Lamplight"	George Benson		109	33	–	First recorded by Heatwave
1980	"Lovelines"	Karen Carpenter		–	–	–	From Carpenter's solo album, recorded in 1979 and released in 1996.
1981	"Jitterbuggin'"	Heatwave		–	–	34	
1981	"Razzamattazz"	Quincy Jones		–	17	11	
1981	"Turn On the Action"	Quincy Jones		–	–	–	
1981	"Do You Love Me?"	Patti Austin		–	24	76	
1981	"Hypnotique"	Bob James					
1981	"The Steamin' Feeling"	Bob James					
1981	"Sign Of The Times"	Bob James					
1982	"Gettin' to the Good Part"	Herbie Hancock	Herbie Hancock	–	47	–	
1982	"Lettin' It Loose"	Heatwave		–	54	–	
1982	"Lite Me Up"	Herbie Hancock		–	52	–	
1982	"Baby, Come to Me"	Patti Austin and James Ingram		1	9	11	1984: Stephanie Winslow, no.42 US country 1997: Alexander O'Neal & Cherrelle, no.56 UK
1982	"Love Is in Control (Finger on the Trigger)"	Donna Summer	Quincy Jones, Merria Ross	10	4	18	
1983	"Thriller"	Michael Jackson		4	3	10	2007: Michael Jackson, no.57 UK (re-entry); 2008: Michael Jackson, no.35 UK (re-entry); 2009: Michael Jackson, no.12 UK (re-entry); 2010: Michael Jackson, no.68 UK (re-entry); 2011: The Glee Cast, no.38 US, no.23 UK; 2011: Michael Jackson, no.79 UK (re-entry); 2012: Michael Jackson, no.49 UK (re-entry); 2013: Michael Jackson, no.42 US, no.49 UK (re-entry); 2014: Michael Jackson, no.35 US (re-entry)
1983	"Baby Be Mine"	Michael Jackson		–	–	–	
1983	"The Lady in My Life"	Michael Jackson		–	–	–	
1983	"Spice of Life"	The Manhattan Transfer	Derek Bramble	40	32	19	
1983	"Yah Mo B There"	James Ingram and Michael McDonald	James Ingram, Michael McDonald, Quincy Jones	19	5	12	
1984	"Mystery"	The Manhattan Transfer		102	80	–	1986: Rapture
1986	"Sweet Freedom"	Michael McDonald		7	17	12	2002: Safri Duo, no.54 UK
1986	"Man Size Love"	Klymaxx		15	43	86	
1990	"The Secret Garden (Sweet Seduction Suite)"	Quincy Jones feat. Al B. Sure!, James Ingram, El DeBarge, Barry White	Quincy Jones, Siedah Garrett, El DeBarge	31	1	67	
1991	"Givin' In to Love"	Patti Austin		–	55	–	
1993	"Never Do You Wrong"	Stephanie Mills	Vassal Benford, Ron Spearman, Carol Duboc	–	33	57	
1993	"Two in a Million"	Mica Paris		–	–	51	
1994	"Vibe" (includes a sample of "Love x Love", from Give Me the Night, 1980)	Zhané	Kier Gist, Renée Neufville	119	33	67	
1995	"Hey Lover" (includes a sample of "The Lady in My Life", from Thriller, 1982)	LL Cool J	James Todd Smith	3	3	17	
1995	"You Put a Move on My Heart"	Tamia		98	16	–	First recorded by Mica Paris
2020	"Turn Down the Sound"	Nikki Yanofsky	Nikki Yanofsky	–	–	–	
2020	"Bubbles"	Nikki Yanofsky	Nikki Yanofsky	–	–	–	
"–" denotes releases that did not chart.

== Production credits ==
- The Running Scared soundtrack album, 1986 (with Dick Rudolph and Bruce Swedien)
- "We Belong to Love" by Jeffrey Osborne from Emotional, 1986
- Kiss of Life by Siedah Garrett, 1988 (with Dick Rudolph)
- Back on the Block by Quincy Jones, 1989 (associate producer)
- "Givin' In to Love" by Patti Austin, from Carry On, 1991
- "You Put a Move on My Heart", "We Were Made for Love", "Two in a Million", and "Love Keeps Coming Back" by Mica Paris, from Whisper a Prayer, 1993
- "We Are the Future", from We Are the Future: You Are the Answer, 2004 (with Sunny Levine)

== Arranging ==
- Back on the Block, with Andrae Crouch, Quincy Jones, Quincy Jones III, and Bill Summers; Wee B. Dooinit, with Siedah Garrett, Jones, Mark Kibble, and Ian Prince; Birdland (winner of the 1991 Grammy Award for Best Instrumental Arrangement), with Jerry Hey, Jones, and Prince; Tomorrow (A Better You, Better Me), with Hey and Jones; The Secret Garden, with Garrett, Hey, and Jones, from Back on the Block, 1989
- You Put a Move on My Heart, with John Clayton; Rock with You, with Jones, Jones III, and Greg Phillinganes; Stomp, with Hey and Jones; Heaven's Girl, with Hey, Jones, and R. Kelly; and Slow Jams, with Clayton, Hey, and Phillinganes, from Q's Jook Joint, 1995
- Lovelines, If We Try and My Body Keeps Changing My Mind, from solo album by Karen Carpenter recorded in 1979–1980, released in 1996.
