= Johnnie Wilder Jr. =

American singer (1949–2006)

- Johnnie Wilder Jr. circa 1970s

Background information
- Born: July 3, 1949; Dayton, Ohio, United States
- Died: May 13, 2006 (aged 56) Dayton, Ohio, United States
- Genres: R&B, funk, disco
- Formerly of: Heatwave

Johnnie James Wilder Jr. (July 3, 1949 – May 13, 2006) was an American musician, co-founder and vocalist of the R&B/funk group Heatwave. The group were popular during the late 1970s with hits such as "Boogie Nights", "Mind Blowing Decisions", "Always and Forever", and "The Groove Line".

== Life ==
Johnnie Wilder Jr. was born in Dayton, Ohio. He served in the U.S. Army during the Vietnam War era, serving briefly in Vietnam as an infantryman before being reassigned to West Germany, where he first began performing solo in taverns and night clubs, following his discharge, he opted to stay in Germany before relocating to the United Kingdom where he met future Heatwave songwriter/keyboardist Rod Temperton through an ad placed in a local paper.

On February 24, 1979, a van broadsided Wilder's car, paralyzing him from the neck down and hospitalizing him for a year.

During the 1980s and 1990s, Wilder went on to record other albums with the group, as well as an album with his brother titled Sound of Soul in 1989. Later he began a solo gospel career, singing a cappella on the albums My Goal and One More Day. The latter album featured a re-recording of the song "All I Am" written by Lynsey de Paul and Susan Sheridan, that was originally recorded for the Heatwave album, Candles. Referring to My Goal and One More Day, he stated "The music that I'm doing is my way of giving thanks to God for being alive".

He had a wife, Rosalyn. The couple had a daughter together named Carla.

He died in his sleep on May 13, 2006, at his home in Dayton, Ohio, aged 56, from complications of his paralysis and was laid to rest in Dayton National Cemetery.
