= Heatwave (band) =

UK based funk band

- Heatwave, 1982

Background information
- Origin: London, England
- Genres: Funk, R&B, soul
- Years active: 1975–present
- Labels: GTO, Epic
- Members: Napoleon Eugene Phillips; Elliot Levine; ELWarren Weatherspoon; Anthony Contee; Darryl Grady; Dijon Anderson; Grant Nicholas; Stephen Mitchell
- Past members: Johnnie Wilder Jr. Keith Wilder; Rod Temperton; Michael F Murphy; Frank Burke; Tommie Harris; Mario Mantese; Ernest Berger; Audrey Hayes; Eric Johns; Billy Jones; Roy Carter; Derek Bramble; Calvin Duke; J.D. Nicholas; Peter Jordan; Bryan Lammers; Marvin Jones; Keith Harrison; Donovan Blackwood; Byron Byrd; Tim Houpe; Ignatius Mason; Leslie Campbell; Charles Ransom II

Heatwave is a funk band formed in London, England in 1975. Its most popular line-up featured Americans Johnnie Wilder Jr. and Keith Wilder (vocals) of Dayton, Ohio; Englishmen Rod Temperton (keyboards) and Roy Carter (guitar); Swiss Mario Mantese (bass); Czechoslovak Ernest "Bilbo" Berger (drums); and Jamaican Eric Johns (guitar).

They are known for their singles "Boogie Nights", "The Groove Line", and "Always and Forever".

== History ==
=== Heatwave's mainstream years 1976–1982 ===
Founding member Johnnie Wilder was an American serviceman based in West Germany when he first began performing; upon his discharge from the US Army, he stayed in Germany. He sang in nightclubs and taverns with an assortment of bands while still enlisted. By mid-year, he decided to relocate to the United Kingdom and through an ad placed in a local paper he linked up with songwriter/keyboardist Rod Temperton.

Touring the London nightclub circuit billed as Chicago's Heatwave during the mid-1970s allowed them to refine their sound, adding a funk groove to disco beats. In search of a fuller sound vocally, Johnnie Wilder called upon his brother Keith Wilder (who was performing in a local band in Dayton, Ohio) to join the band on vocals. The group signed to GTO Records in 1976 (Epic Records would handle GTO's releases in the US). They were paired in the studio with GTO house producer/session guitarist Barry Blue and rhythm guitarist Jesse Whitten. Rhythm guitarist Roy Carter replaced Whitten after Whitten was stabbed to death. They began creating their first album Too Hot to Handle in the autumn of 1976.

Their third single, "Boogie Nights" from their debut album, in 1977 reached No. 2 on the British popular music charts in January and in America in November. The single was certified platinum by the RIAA. The group's debut album, Too Hot to Handle, was released in the spring of 1977, giving Heatwave a No. 11 on the Hot 200 and No. 5 on the R&B charts, while the next single, the soul ballad "Always and Forever", reached No. 18 on the Hot 100 in April 1978 and No. 2 on the R&B charts. The single was certified platinum by the RIAA.

Continuing to use Barry Blue's production skills, Heatwave released their second album Central Heating in March 1978. Lead single "The Groove Line", reached No. 7 on the Hot 100 in July 1978. The single was certified platinum by the RIAA.

During the late 1970s, the band changed. At first Eric Johns quit the band and Billy Jones was his replacement as guitarist. Then Rod Temperton quit the band. Although Temperton would continue writing new songs for Heatwave until 1982, he soon became better-known for his songwriting for other artists, penning award-winning songs for some of funk's biggest names, including Rufus, The Brothers Johnson and George Benson. He also wrote for Herbie Hancock and Quincy Jones, but his most famous partnership remains the one forged with Michael Jackson, writing three songs for each of Jackson's first two Epic albums Off the Wall (1979) and Thriller (1982), including their title tracks.

Despite these changes, Heatwave were about to return to the studio when Mantese attended a party at Elton John's house in London in 1978. He was with his girlfriend, who decided to go home early from the party, reason unknown. When Mantese arrived home, she was furious with him, perhaps from an incident that happened at the party, and stabbed him. The knife hit him in the heart and for several minutes, he was clinically dead. When, after several months, he awoke from a coma, he was blind, mute and paralysed in his entire body. To date, he has no memory of this tragic event. He decided not to press charges against his girlfriend, and moved in with her after leaving the hospital. Mantese was replaced by bassist Derek Bramble. Adding keyboardist Calvin Duke to the group, and now working with new producer Phil Ramone, Heatwave cut Hot Property, released in May 1979.

Around this time Heatwave performed "Keep Tomorrow for Me" used over the end credits of the action comedy Escape to Athena. Composed by Barry Blue and written by Rod Temperton with some orchestrations by Christodoulous, the song is considered by some to be one of the group's best but never got a wide release due to the rights being locked up with Lew Grade's ITC Entertainment. The film performed poorly at the box office and the proposed soundtrack (with a score composed by Lalo Schifrin) was cancelled except in Japan where the song was released on the soundtrack to the film under its Japanese title "Offsides 7" and only on vinyl in that country.

During the winter of 1979, Johnnie Wilder, Jr., suffered injuries in an auto accident while visiting family and friends in Dayton, Ohio. Although he survived, the accident left him paralysed from the neck down and unable to continue performing live with the group, though he did continue to perform vocals in the studio. After the accident, Johnnie remained a co-producer of the group, along with Blue.

During 1980, Heatwave recorded the Candles album, with Temperton again providing the songs, except stand out track "All I Am", written by Blue's former writing partner Lynsey de Paul who was asked by Wilder to contribute the song. The group recruited James Dean "J.D." Nicholas, who later became a member of the Commodores, to sing additional lead vocals in studio and perform live with them.

Heatwave's November single "Gangsters of the Groove" was a popular music success, scoring number 21 on the US R&B chart (failing to make the Hot 100), and number 19 in the United Kingdom early in the New Year. But the album peaked at number 71 in the United States in December 1980.

Heatwave's 1982 LP, Current, marked yet another new era for the band, as they returned to producer Blue. The album managed number 156 on the US Billboard 200, although it scored the band a number 21 success on the R&B charts, where Heatwave continued to be a strong presence. A Rod Temperton penned single, "Lettin' It Loose", proved a minor success during August.

Derek Bramble quit the band at the end of 1982, like Roy Carter, for a career in production (he would go on to work with David Bowie on 1984s Tonight LP, and later masterminded Jaki Graham's breakthrough). J.D. Nicholas left after the Candles release in 1980 to replace Lionel Richie as the lead singer of the Commodores in 1984.

=== Break-up period ===
In approximately 1986, Keith Wilder and Roy Carter sought the services of Central Line guitarists/songwriters Henri Defoe and Michael Finbarr Murphy (the latter having also recently produced Unknown Quantity, consisting of the 3 backing vocalists and dancers in the "Chain Reaction" hit music video by Diana Ross, which also featured Michael on guitar). Keith and Roy wanted to enlist them for a tour of the British US Air Force Bases. Michael's distant cousin, Alan Murphy, the now-deceased one-time guitarist for Kate Bush, Go West, and Level 42 also expressed interest in working with Heatwave as a band, though it would never materialise.

=== Post-1988 Heatwave ===
Silent as a band since early 1983, Heatwave reconvened in a new line-up to record and release the album The Fire in 1988. However, Keith Wilder was the only original member of the band present in this incarnation (although Billy Jones, who had joined the band in the late 1970s returned as well). Meanwhile, that same year, Johnnie Wilder released a solo spiritual album My Goal. The Wilder brothers once again teamed up the following year for the gospel album, Sound of Soul. None of these late 1980s albums sold well, but Heatwave's recognition was revitalised in 1991, when a remix version of their "Mind Blowing Decisions" charted in the UK. By the mid to late 1980s, Keith Wilder was joined by bassist Dave Williamson and vocalist Donovan Blackwood and in the 1990s had again reformed the band. Joined by keyboardists Kevin Sutherland and Byron Byrd, guitarist Bill Jones, and original drummer Ernest Berger, the reborn Heatwave launched an American tour with a live album recorded at the Greek Theater in Hollywood, arriving in 1997.

=== Deaths ===
Johnnie Wilder died in his sleep at his home in Dayton, Ohio on 13 May 2006.

On 5 October 2016, Temperton's death was announced after what was described by his music publisher as "a brief aggressive battle with cancer". Temperton had died at the age of 66 in London the previous week and his funeral had already taken place. The exact date of his death was not announced.

Keith Wilder (born Keith Edward Wilder on 20 December 1951 in Dayton, Ohio) died on 29 October 2017, at the age of 65.

Drummer Ernest "Bilbo" Berger died of a heart attack on 1 March 2024, at the age of 73, leaving bassist Mario Mantese as the sole living original member of Heatwave.

== Discography ==
=== Studio albums ===
| Year | Album | Peak chart Positions | | | | | Certifications | Record label |
| Year | Album | UK | CAN | NZ | US | US R&B | Certifications | Record label |
|---|---|---|---|---|---|---|---|---|
| 1976 | Too Hot to Handle | 46 | 14 | 36 | 11 | 5 | BPI: Silver; RIAA: Platinum | GTO / Epic |
| 1978 | Central Heating | 26 | 38 | — | 10 | 2 | BPI: Silver; RIAA: Platinum | GTO / Epic |
| 1979 | Hot Property | — | — | — | 38 | 16 | RIAA: Gold | GTO / Epic |
| 1980 | Candles | 29 | — | — | 71 | 24 | | GTO / Epic |
| 1982 | Current | — | — | — | 156 | 21 | | Epic |
| 1988 | The Fire | — | — | — | — | — | | Soul City |
"—" denotes a recording that did not chart or was not released in that territory.

=== Compilation albums ===
| Year | Album | Peaks | Record label |
| Year | Album | UK | Record label |
|---|---|---|---|
| 1981 | Greatest Hits | — | GTO |
| 1982 | Power Cuts: All Their Hottest Hits | — | Epic |
| 1983 | Heatwave - Maximum Heat | — | Hallmark |
| 1984 | Heatwave's Greatest Hits | — | Epic |
| 1991 | Gangsters of the Groove – '90s Mix | 56 | Telstar |
| 1995 | Always and Forever | — | Sony Music |
| 1996 | The Best of Heatwave: Always & Forever | — | Legacy |
| 2007 | Best of Heatwave | — | Mastercuts |
| 2020 | "Heatwave GOLD" | — | Crimson |
"—" denotes a recording that did not chart or was not released in that territory.

=== Singles ===
| Year | Single | Peak chart Positions | | | | | | | | | | Certifications | Album |
| Year | Single | UK | AUS | CAN | IRE | NL | NZ | US | US R&B | US Dan | US A/C | Certifications | Album |
|---|---|---|---|---|---|---|---|---|---|---|---|---|---|
| 1976 | "Ain't No Half Steppin'" | — | — | — | — | — | — | — | — | — | — | | Too Hot to Handle |
| 1976 | "Super Soul Sister" | — | — | — | — | — | — | — | — | — | — | | Too Hot to Handle |
| 1977 | "Boogie Nights" | 2 | 54 | 2 | — | 17 | 1 | 2 | 5 | 36 | — | BPI: Silver; MC: Gold; RIAA: Platinum | Too Hot to Handle |
| 1977 | "Too Hot to Handle" | 15 | — | — | — | — | 28 | — | — | — | — | | Too Hot to Handle |
| 1977 | "Slip Your Disc to This" | 15 | — | — | — | — | 28 | — | — | — | — | | —N/a |
| 1977 | "Always and Forever" | 9 | — | 10 | 17 | — | — | 18 | 2 | — | 33 | BPI: Silver; RIAA: Platinum | Too Hot to Handle |
| 1977 | "Mind Blowing Decisions" (remix) | 9 | — | — | — | — | — | — | — | — | — | | Central Heating |
| 1978 | "The Groove Line" | 12 | — | 31 | 5 | 45 | — | 7 | 3 | — | — | RIAA: Platinum | Central Heating |
| 1978 | "Mind Blowing Decisions" | 12 | — | — | 15 | — | 35 | — | 49 | — | — | | Central Heating |
| 1979 | "Eyeballin'" | — | — | — | — | — | — | — | 30 | — | — | | Hot Property |
| 1979 | "Razzle Dazzle" | 43 | — | — | — | — | — | — | — | — | — | | Hot Property |
| 1979 | "One Night Tan" | — | — | — | — | — | — | — | — | — | — | | Hot Property |
| 1979 | "Therm Warfare" | — | — | — | — | — | — | — | — | — | — | | Hot Property |
| 1980 | "Gangsters of the Groove" | 19 | — | — | 27 | — | — | 110 (Note: Billboard Bubbling Under Hot 100) | 21 | 74 | — | | Candles |
| 1981 | "Where Did I Go Wrong" | — | — | — | — | — | — | — | 74 | — | — | | Candles |
| 1981 | "Jitterbuggin'" | 34 | — | — | — | — | — | — | — | — | — | | Candles |
| 1981 | "Posin' Til Closin'" | — | — | — | — | — | — | — | — | — | — | | Candles |
| 1981 | "Turn Around" | — | — | — | — | — | — | — | — | — | — | | Candles |
| 1982 | "Lettin' It Loose" | — | — | — | — | — | — | — | 54 | — | — | | Current |
| 1982 | "Look After Love" | — | — | — | — | — | — | — | — | — | — | | Current |
| 1987 | "Straight from the Heart" | — | — | — | — | — | — | — | — | — | — | | The Fire |
| 1988 | "Who Dat?" | — | — | — | — | — | — | — | — | — | — | | The Fire |
| 1990 | "Mind Blowing Decisions" (Decision Mix) | 65 | — | — | — | — | — | — | — | — | — | | Gangsters of the Groove |
| 1990 | "Feel Like Making Love" (featuring Jocelyn Brown) | 90 | — | — | — | 45 | — | — | — | — | — | | Gangsters of the Groove |
| 2001 | "Grooveline" (Pete Lorimer vs Heatwave) | — | — | — | — | — | — | — | — | 24 | — | | —N/a |
"—" denotes a recording that did not chart or was not released in that territory.
