= The Kingpins (English vocal group) =

- Origin: Dewsbury, England
- Genre: pop
- Years active: 1955–1962
- Label: Parlophone
- Past members: Brian Adams; John Putnam; Frank Slavin (deceased); Melvyn Thomas (aka Brad Newman (deceased)

The Kingpins was an English pop vocal group, founded in the 1950s in Dewsbury.

== Career ==
The group made three appearances supported by Tito Burns' 6-5ers on the BBC television series Six-Five Special between 13 December 1958 and 27 December 1958, and nine appearances supported by Bob Miller and the Millermen on the BBC television series Drumbeat between 4 April 1959 and 20 June 1959, and they contributed two tracks to the LP record entitled Drumbeat that accompanied the television series, the tracks were; a cover of Bobby Freeman's "Shame On You Miss Johnson" (written by Bobby Freeman), and Bobby Tempest's Don't Leave Me (Like This) (written by Brian Bushby aka Bobby Tempest). The Kingpins were managed by Tito Burns, and in 1959 toured on The Dickie Valentine Show, with The Fraser Hayes Four, and Billie Anthony.

Brian Adams and John Putnam later left The Kingpins, and replaced Vince Hill and Johnny Worth as members of The Raindrops alongside Len Beadle and Jackie Lee.

== Discography ==
=== Albums ===
- Drumbeat Parlophone PMC1101 [mono only], 1959
  - Reissued twenty years later as part of Colin Miles' NUT series on EMI NUTM20
  - Reissued on Audio CD Label: Silva Screen ASIN: B003M4DKQM (28 Jun 2010)
  - Reissued with additional tracks as "Drumbeat/Saturday Club And British Hits of the Late '50s" on Audio CD Label: Jasmine Records ASIN: B003TL8MLG (23 Aug 2010)
