= Zac Shaw =

British visually impaired sprinter (born 1995)

Personal information
- Nickname: Zac
- Nationality: British
- Born: Zachary Shaw; 24 September 1995 (age 30) Grimsby, Lincolnshire, England
- Education: Oasis Academy Wintringham; Loughborough University
- Years active: 2015-present
- Height: 175 cm (5 ft 9 in)
- Weight: 70 kg (150 lb)
- Website: www.zacshaw.co.uk

Sport
- Country: GBR
- Sport: Athletics
- Disability: Visual impairment
- Disability class: T12
- Events: 100m, 4x100m Universal Relay
Medal record
Men's para athletics
Representing Great Britain
Paralympic Games
Silver medal – second place	2024 Paris	mixed 4×100 m relay
Bronze medal – third place	2024 Paris	100 m T12
World Championships
Silver medal – second place	2023 Paris	4x100m Universal Relay
Silver medal – second place	2024 Kobe	4x100m Universal Relay
Bronze medal – third place	2023 Paris	100 m T12
Bronze medal – third place	2024 Kobe	100 m T12
European Championships
Gold medal – first place	2018 Berlin	4x100M Universal Relay
Silver medal – second place	2021 Bydgoszcz	4x100m Universal Relay
Bronze medal – third place	2021 Bydgoszcz	100m T12
National Championships
Gold medal – first place	2022 Birmingham	60m Ambulant
Silver medal – second place	2023 Birmingham	60m Ambulant
Silver medal – second place	2024 Birmingham	60m Ambulant
Gold medal – first place	2020 Manchester	100m Ambulant
Gold medal – first place	2022 Manchester	100m Ambulant
Gold medal – first place	2024 Manchester	100m Ambulant
Representing England
Commonwealth Games
Gold medal – first place	2026 Glasgow	100m T12
Silver medal – second place	2022 Birmingham	100m T12

Zac Shaw (born 24 September 1995) is a British Paralympic visually impaired sprinter who competes in the T12 classification. At the age of nine he became afflicted with stargardt disease. He made his first Great Britain squad for the IPC Athletics World Championships in 2015. Shaw made the Great Britain squad for the 2024 Summer Paralympics in Paris after just missing out on both the 2016 Summer Paralympics and 2020 Summer Paralympics.

Shaw has been to many major Championships throughout his career finishing 7th in the World in the T12 100m and 200m at the World Para Athletics Championships in London. He competed at the 2018 Commonwealth Games in Australia's Gold Coast.

Shaw’s first individual international medals came at the 2021 World Para Athletics European Championships where he won Bronze in the T12 100M and Silver in the 4X100m Universal Relay. This year ultimately ended in heartbreak again when he wasn't selected for the 2020 Summer Paralympics in Tokyo, Japan.

In 2022 Shaw went on to win Silver in the T12 100M at the 2022 Commonwealth Games in Birmingham, England.

He won his first World medals in 2023 at the 2023 World Para Athletics Championships. He won Bronze in the T12 100m and Silver in the 4x100m Universal Relay. He followed this up by repeating this success at the 2024 World Para Athletics Championships in Kobe, Japan. Shaw was also selected to co-captain the Great Britain team in Kobe with teammate Ali Smith (athlete).

Shaw is part of the ParalympicsGB squad in Paris for the 2024 Summer Paralympics.

== Personal history ==
Shaw was born in the Lincolnshire town of Grimsby on 24 September 1995. He is the youngest of six boys and his family is involved in the business industry. At the age of nine Shaw started to become afflicted with stargardt disease, an inherited condition that affects his central vision, that went undiagnosed until he was 13. Shaw had his secondary education at Oasis Academy Wintringham and The Grimsby Institute. He went to Sheffield Hallam University and later Loughborough University after receiving a sports scholarship in 2016. Outside of para-athletics, Shaw works as the Accessibility Lead for digital transformations company Cyber-Duck, a CACI business.

== Career ==
After being inspired following the London 2012 Paralympics he began training to fulfil his dream at the 2016 Summer Paralympics held in Rio de Janeiro in November 2013 when he joined Cleethorpes Athletic Club. Shaw was placed in the T12 disability classifications for those with visual impairments. The following year, he began these efforts by winning the silver medal in both the 100 and 200 metres events at the 2014 UK School Games. In 2015 Shaw was internationally classified in 2015 in Berlin at the IPC Grand Prix.

Later that year he made the Great Britain squad for the IPC Athletics World Championships in Doha after qualifying with a time of 11.32 seconds at the CAU Inter-County Championships at Bedford International Athletic Stadium, placing sixth overall in the 100 metres (T13) with an 11.33 seconds effort which at the time was his personal best in the discipline, and finishing sixth in the final of the 200 metres (T13) with a time of 22.88 seconds, another personal best. Shaw trained for the World Championships by undertaking sessions in sand dunes at Cleethorpes Beach and focusing on his strengths.

In 2016, Shaw kicked off his season at the Dubai IPC Grand Prix after missing the majority of winter training through a shin injury, the 100 metres in the BUCS Outdoor Athletics Championships, and in the same discipline at the Barcelona Kern Pharma – Sauleda. He along with 48 other para-athletes were chosen to represent Great Britain at the IPC Athletics European Championships in Grosseto in June. Shaw placed seventh in the 100 metres and came fifth in the 200 metres (both in the T13 classification). In spite of these efforts, Shaw was told later in the year that he had not made the team for the Summer Paralympics. While Shaw spoke of his disappointment he said that it was "the start of a long journey."

In March 2017, he was reclassified as T12 at the Dubai IPC Grand Prix, and retained his title in the 100 metres discipline in the BUCS Outdoor Athletics Championships held the following month. Shaw competed in the London World Para Athletics Championships in July. Although Shaw was targeting a medal he came fourth in his semi-final for the 100 metres (T12) and his effort resulted in him failing to progress into the final. Nevertheless, he narrowly won his heat in the 200 metres (T12) which advanced him into the semi-finals with a new personal best of 22.73 seconds but failed to qualify for the final after placing second, behind Algeria's.Nasser Djamil.

In December 2017, Shaw was announced as one of eighteen para-athletes that had been selected to represent England at the 2018 Commonwealth Games due to be held in Australia's Gold Coast. He visited a Tenerife training camp in January 2018 to prepare to the Games. He competed in the T12 100m at the Gold Coast, running second in his heat behind Hilton Langenhoven, but did not progress to the final.

In June 2022, he was named in the 72-member squad selected to represent England in athletics at the 2022 Commonwealth Games in Birmingham. He went on to win a silver medal in the T12 100m in front of a packed home crowd. He was a batonbearer in the Queen's Baton Relay when it visited Hull, Yorkshire, on 13 July 2022.

Shaw won World medals at the 2023 World Para Athletics Championships in Paris. He won Bronze in the T12 100m and Silver in the 4x100m Universal Relay. He repeated this again at the 2024 World Para Athletics Championships in Kobe, Japan. He won Bronze in the t12 100m and Silver in the 4x100m Universal Relay.

Zac is coached in Loughborough by former Commonwealth Games 200m champion Leon Baptiste.

Alongside his work for Cyber-Duck a CACI business, Zac does charitable work. He is a Patron for Macular Society and an ambassador for Epilepsy Action. He also sits on the athlete panels for England Athletics and UK Athletics athlete commission.

In late 2023, Shaw signed his first professional contract with Puma (brand). He is currently an active Puma (brand) ambassador and athlete. Shaw is Puma (brand)’s only Para-athletics athlete within Great Britain.

Zac was selected in the 33 strong Para-athletics team for Great Britain at the 2024 Summer Paralympics in Paris, France.

At the Paralympic Games Shaw won a bronze medal in the T12 100 metres, following the disqualification of Serkan Yıldırım. He then went on to compete in the Universal relay, alongside Jonnie Peacock, Ali Smith (athlete) and Sammi Kinghorn, winning the silver medal.
