= Brad Newman =

British singer-songwriter

Brad Newman (born Charles Melvyn Thomas in Wakefield, West Yorkshire, England, 6 December 1938, died in Spain on 18 January 1999) was an English singer-songwriter and pianist who, in 1962, reached number 47 in the UK Singles Chart with the song "Somebody to Love".

== Career ==
Charles Thomas's musical career started with a vocal trio called The Kingpins whom he joined as a pianist following six years at the Leeds College of Music. After a while he began to sing with them as well. In 1955 The Kingpins topped the bill at the Newcastle Palace, and went on to make successful appearances at the Pavilion Theatre in Glasgow. Then he was called up and he served two years in the RAF. Afterwards he returned to join the group on the TV show Six Five Special. More success followed after they became the resident group on the BBC pop show Drumbreat, which also starred Adam Faith, the John Barry Seven, Vince Eager and Billy Fury. After another seasonal theatre show at Weymouth, Dorset with Morecambe and Wise and a tour with Cliff Richard, the trio broke up after which Thomas decided to go solo.

Before he launched his own solo career, under the pseudonym Brad Newman, he went to the Isle of Wight in 1961 to play piano in the residents' bar at the Sandringham Hotel, Sandown. During this period he and Tommie Connor wrote a song called "Somebody to Love". When Newman performed it the audience received it enthusiastically and one of them, a songwriter himself, advised him to go to London and contact the publisher Dick James. James was impressed with the half-dozen songs that Newman sang and took him to see Fontana's A & R Manager Jack Baverstock to demonstrate the numbers. James was only trying to sell the songs but Jack Baverstock liked Newman's singing voice and decided that he would make the discs too. The result was Newmans's first disc for Fontana Records, "Somebody to Love", coupled with "This Time It's Love", both his own compositions. "Somebody to Love" reached number 47 in the UK singles charts in February 1962. On the back of this small hit record Newman appeared on top rated TV shows including Discs A Gogo for TWW (Television Wales and the West), Thank Your Lucky Stars (TV series) for ABC Weekend TV, a BBC Light Programme series of shows called Teenagers Turn and a radio series called Here we go with the NDO (BBC Northern Dance Orchestra). He also joined the Adam Faith Show tour for a series of one-nighters.

The follow-up single, "Get a Move On", was entered in the heats of the Eurovision Song Contest 1962 to pick the British entry, which took place on 11 February of that year. (See United Kingdom in the Eurovision Song Contest 1962). There were twelve entries. The winner was a number entitled "Ring-a-ding Girl" by Ronnie Carroll. Newman came nowhere at all and the record went the same way. After his third self-penned single, "Stay By Me", failed to chart Newman turned to a Goffin and King number, "Point of No Return", for his fourth release. This one did no better and he returned to his own material for his last Fontana offering, "I'll Find You Another Baby". He did his best to produce a contemporary sound but Fontana was past funding the lavish orchestral backing that the song warranted and he had to make do with a small combo and his own piano playing. After that he and Fontana parted company. There was however one last disc on the Piccadilly label. Released on 6 March 1964, "Please Don't Cry" failed to generate significant sales and became his last recording. The B-side, "Every Hour of Living", was a better song, reminiscent of "Somebody to Love".

In 1967, Newman returned to the Isle of Wight and opened at The Vancouver Bar on Sandown sea front, with himself on piano and Bert Reed on drums. His repertoire covered the music of Chuck Berry, Little Richard, Dusty Springfield, the Turtles and Tom Jones. He was well received and performed there for three seasons. Leaving the Vancouver, Brad played at Daishes Hotel and The Holliers at Shanklin and Sandown Social Club during the 1970s and 1980s. He then went to Spain before returning to Oldham in the early 1990s. There he entertained in various public houses for a year or two before returning to Spain in the mid-1990s to run his own bar on the Costa del Sol. On 18 January 1999, he died there at the age of sixty. He was performing until just before his death.

== Singles ==
- "Somebody to Love" / This Time It's Love" – 1962 – Fontana H357
- "Get A Move On" / "Here And Now and Evermore" – 1962 – Fontana H369
- "Stay By Me" / "Candy Lips" – 1962 – Fontana 267 220TF
- "Point of No Return" / "Now I've Lost You" – 1962 – Fontana 267 243TF
- "I'll Find You Another Baby" / "No Man Should Ever Be Alone" – 1963 – Fontana 267 273TF
- "Please Don't Cry" / "Every Hour of Living" – 1964 – Piccadilly 7N 35174
