= Len Beadle =

English music publisher, songwriter, music producer and performer (1932–2000)

- Beadle, top, with The Raindrops

Background information
- Born: Leonard Stanley Beadle; 13 February 1932; Welling, Kent
- Died: 1 June 2000 (aged 68)
- Occupations: A&R executive, music producer, music publisher, songwriter, musician, arranger
- Instruments: Piano, trombone
- Labels: ATV Music; Bruton Music; April Music; Laurence Wright Music Co. Ltd. MAM Records; CBS Songs

Len Beadle (13 February 1932 – 1 June 2000) was an English music publisher, songwriter, music producer and performer, most famous for writing the theme to the hit children's TV show The Adventures of Rupert Bear. He formed the vocal harmony group The Raindrops together with Jackie Lee.

== Early life ==
Len Beadle was born in Welling, Kent. After leaving school at the age of 14 he learned to play the trombone, and was already performing in Big bands of the day in venues around London and the South East with musicians such as Humphrey Lyttelton and Chris Barber at the age of 15. His music career was briefly interrupted by two years national service from 1950 until 1952. During these years he played the trombone in the RAF Orchestra while stationed at RAF Hornchurch, RAF Padgate and RAF Henlow. After rejoining civviestreet, Beadle played in several travelling jazz and Big bands of the day including Joe Daniels and his Hot Shots and the Teddy Foster Orchestra.

== Performing ==
From 1959 to 1964, Beadle was arranger, song-writer and singer of the vocal harmony group The Raindrops (later renamed Jackie and the Raindrops – and not to be confused with the US group by the same name). Other group members included Jackie Lee, Vince Hill, and Johnny Worth/Les Vandyke. The Raindrops recorded many songs, made numerous TV performances on Drumbeat, The Benny Hill Show, the Tommy Steele Show and others, and produced one of the first music videos when they covered "Locomotion" in the 1966 film, Disk-O-Tek Holiday (UK title: Just for You).

== Raindrops discography ==
- Raindrops
  - "Italian Style" / "Along Came Jones", Parlophone R4559, 1959
  - "If I Had my Life to Live Over" / "Let's Make a Foursome", Oriole CB1544, 1960
  - "Banjo Boy" / "Crazy Rhythm", Oriole CB1555, 1960
  - "Will You Love Me Tomorrow" / "Raindrops", Oriole CB1595, 1961
  - "Paintin' The Town with Teardrops" / "A Letter from Anne", Oriole CB1707, 1962
- Jackie Lee & The Raindrops
  - "There's No-one in the Whole Wide World" / "I Was the Last One to Know", Oriole CB1702, 1962
  - "There Goes the Lucky One" / "I Built my World Around a Dream", Oriole CB1727, 1962
  - "The Loco-motion", 1963. Recorded for Oriole but issued by Decca on the Just for You soundtrack album
  - "Maybe It's the Madison", 1963
  - "Down Our Street" / "My Heart is Your Heart", Philips BF1283, 1963
  - "Come On Dream, Come On" / "Here I Go Again", Philips BF1328, 1964

== Songwriting ==
In addition to the numerous songs penned for the Raindrops, Beadle wrote songs for other artists including "Walkin' Tall" for Adam Faith which charted at 23 in the UK charts in 1963 and "Who Needs It" and "She's my Girl" which he wrote for Gene Pitney and Bobby Shafto in 1964 respectively and which both achieved moderate Billboard Chart success in the US. However his most successful song-writing credit came when he wrote the theme to the children's TV Show The Adventures of Rupert Bear in 1971 together with lyricist Ron Roker. Rupert (which included the erroneous lyric "Rupert the Bear" to help the lyrics to fit the beat of the song – although Rupert never had the definite article in his name) reached 14 in the British charts in 1971 and was sung by Jackie Lee (Beadle's ex-wife) who also recorded the hit White Horses. Due to potential professional and contractual conflicts, Beadle wrote the song under the pseudonym Frank Weston. Rupert has since been included in several children's music compilation albums.

Aside from popular music, Beadle also wrote numerous pieces of classical and electronic music which have been used for many years as library music. Possibly his most-used piece was "Western Panorama" which has been played in TV and radio productions (including Keeping Up Appearances and SpongeBob SquarePants) because of its instantly recognisable "wild west" sound. Indeed, Beadle was sued for breach of intellectual property by the owners of the theme to The Magnificent Seven. Beadle won the case and was eventually acquitted of all plagiarism charges.

== Music publishing ==
After the Raindrops split up, Beadle took a job as a Professional Manager at the Lawrence Wright Music company in 1965 before he was hired in 1968 by Lew Grade to help set up the ATV Music publishing house as a division of Associated Television. Under his stewardship, ATV music (and its subsidiaries Bruton Music and The Regency Line) built up a catalogue of songs which included the Beatles' song catalogue Northern Songs, as well as songs by The Searchers, The Kinks, Donovan, The Moody Blues, and Petula Clark. In his time as Creative Director, Beadle was directly involved in establishing and developing the careers of artists and songwriters such as Barry Blue, Stephanie de Sykes, Simon May and Richard Hill (after whom Beadle's first son was named).

After nine years with ATV, then managing director of CBS Records Maurice Oberstein headhunted Beadle to head up the publishing wing of the CBS empire: April Music (later CBS Songs). His notable successes while MD of CBS Songs include being responsible for helping to launch the UK career of Billy Joel after convincing CBS USA to release the rights to his hit song "Just the Way You Are", being heavily involved with Jeff Wayne's smash hit concept album The War of The Worlds and Art Garfunkel's "Bright Eyes" for the film Watership Down which reached number 1 in the United Kingdom, Ireland and in the Netherlands and which sold over 1 million copies worldwide in 1979. In his memoirs, Beadle noted of his time as MD of CBS Songs "I had never really settled at CBS. To me music was written in crotchets...CBS wrote it in dollar signs!"

After leaving CBS, Beadle briefly became managing director of music publishing at MAM Corporation controlling the interests of artists including Tom Jones, Engelbert Humperdinck and Gilbert O'Sullivan.

== Personal life ==
Beadle was married to singer Jackie Lee in the 1960s. After their divorce they remained close friends and colleagues. He married his second wife Beverly (sister of 1970s actress and singer Stephanie de Sykes) in 1974. He was married to Beverly for 26 years until his death in 2000. Beadle's eldest son Richard Beadle is a musical theatre conductor whose conducting work has included The Bodyguard. Beadle was a supporter of Chelsea F.C.
