= Vince Hill =

English singer (1934–2023)

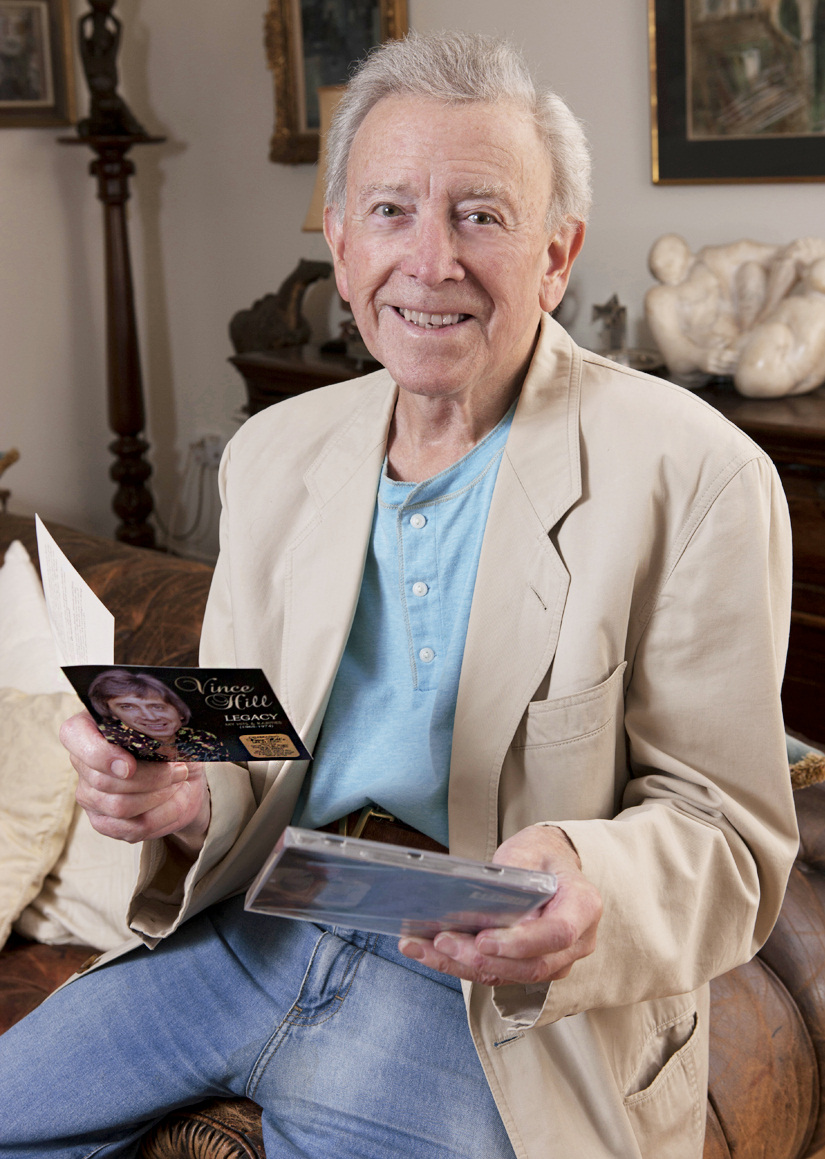
- Hill at his Oxfordshire home, June 2017

Background information
- Born: Vincent Brian Hill; 16 April 1934; Holbrooks, Coventry, England
- Died: 22 July 2023 (aged 89) Henley-on-Thames, Oxfordshire, England
- Genres: Easy listening; traditional pop
- Occupations: Singer; songwriter; record producer; playwright
- Instrument: Vocals
- Years active: 1959–2023
- Labels: Piccadilly; EMI Columbia; CBS; EMI; Music for Pleasure
- Website: vincehill.co.uk

Vincent Brian Hill (16 April 1934 – 22 July 2023) was an English traditional pop singer, best known for his cover version of the Rodgers and Hammerstein show tune "Edelweiss" (1967), which reached No. 2 on the UK singles chart. He recorded 25 studio albums and several soundtracks, wrote songs and plays and hosted TV shows during the 1970s and 1980s, including They Sold a Million (BBC), Musical Time Machine (BBC) and the chat show Gas Street (ITV). Outside his work in show business, he was a patron of the Macular Society, a UK charity for people affected by central vision loss.

== Early life ==
Vincent Hill was born in Holbrooks, Coventry, on 16 April 1934. He first sang professionally in a public house named The Prospect in Margate, Kent, when he was 17 years old. He decided to become a full-time musician after working as a baker, truck driver and coal miner.

His first opportunity as a singer came when he read an advert in Melody Maker magazine, which said that the Band of the Royal Corps of Signals needed a vocalist. He travelled to Catterick camp in Yorkshire where the band was based, performed the audition, and gained the job. This offered Hill a way to undertake his National Service as well as experience performing across the world. After completing his military service, he toured with the musical Florodora, and later became a singer with Teddy Foster's Band, a big band based in London. At the beginning of the 1960s Hill joined a British vocal group, the Raindrops, which gave him his first opportunity to perform in television and radio shows, especially on the BBC radio show Parade of the Pops. The Raindrops also had in its ranks Jackie Lee, Len Beadle and Johnny Worth.

By late 1961, Hill left The Raindrops for a fledgling solo career. His debut entry in the UK Singles Chart was the Les Vandyke penned "The River's Run Dry", which went to No. 41 in June 1962. In 1963, he participated in A Song for Europe, the UK heat of the Eurovision Song Contest, with another Vandyke-penned song, "A Day at the Seaside". The next few years proved fallow, as a succession of single releases failed to reach the chart.

== Solo career ==
In January 1965, Hill was offered an international recording contract with the EMI group, which signed him to their Columbia label. His first Top 20 chart success with his new label came a year later with "Take Me to Your Heart Again", Hill's cover of the Édith Piaf hit "La Vie En Rose", which climbed to No. 13 on the UK Singles Chart in 1966 and No. 18 on the RPM chart in Canada. "Roses of Picardy", composed during the First World War, was another Top 20 success, reaching No. 13 in mid 1967.

Further notable songs that he recorded included "Heartaches" (No. 28, 1966), "Merci Cherie" (written by the Austrian singer Udo Jürgens), which was the winning song in the Eurovision Song Contest 1966, (No. 36, 1966), "Love Letters in the Sand" (No. 23, 1967), "The Importance of Your Love" (music by Gilbert Bécaud, English lyrics by Norman Newell) and "Look Around (And You'll Find Me There)". The latter track, taken from the soundtrack to the film Love Story, was his final Top 20 hit, peaking at No. 12 in the latter half of 1971.

His most successful hit was his cover recording of the Rodgers and Hammerstein song "Edelweiss", from their 1959 musical The Sound of Music. The recording was a No. 2 hit on the UK Singles Chart in March 1967. It was to become his signature tune for the rest of his career, which saw him top the bill at the London Palladium and Talk of the Town. His album Edelweiss was also a hit for EMI Columbia.

Although known mainly for his voice, Hill was also a songwriter and composed many songs with his musical director Ernie Dunstall. These were used on his studio albums and flip sides to his singles of the day. The Dunstall-Hill composition "Why Or Where Or When" was also recorded by Mr. Lee Grant and topped the New Zealand chart in 1968, while "I Never Did As I Was Told" was covered by Broadway star Robert Goulet in 1971. Hill's song "I'm Gonna Make It", sung by Joe Cuddy, was the overall winner of the 1973 Castlebar Song Contest.

Hill's long-term recording contract with EMI Columbia came to an end in 1974, by which time he had released 14 studio albums and countless singles. In the following year he signed to a new recording deal with CBS Records, for whom he released a further three studio albums of contemporary song material. Hill also continued to perform regularly in clubs, cabaret and various stage productions.

In 1976, Hill's life and career were celebrated when he was made the subject of an episode of This Is Your Life (presented by Eamonn Andrews). During the 1970s, Hill also made his début as a television host; his first series was for BBC television, They Sold A Million (1973). Next was the successful The Musical Time Machine, which began in 1975. Both series co-starred the Young Generation. Hill also hosted his own prime-time television show in Canada called Vince Hill At The Club, which also aired in the US.

== 1980s and 1990s ==
From the 1980s onwards, Hill concentrated mainly on his live performances and continued to play all the top venues around the world, including the London Palladium, Royal Albert Hall, Sydney Opera House and Talk of the Town, as well as appearing on cruise ships. He would also continue to make guest appearances on popular television shows of the day, such as The Golden Shot, Seaside Special, Rainbow, The Good Old Days, 3-2-1, Blankety Blank and Cash in the Attic.

In 1982, Hill added acting to his CV, in the BBC radio drama, Tolpuddle (which he also wrote). In 1983, he wrote and performed the song, "It's Maggie for Me", as part of the 1983 general election campaign, in support of the Conservative prime minister Margaret Thatcher, who was re-elected. In 1988, ITV gave Hill his own midday entertainment show, Gas Street, in which he made his début as a TV presenter and interviewer; the show also co-starred Suzi Quatro.

In 1990, Hill took to the stage to play Ivor Novello in the stage play My Dearest Ivor. Hill also wrote the stage musical, Zodiac. His stage acting continued, including a starring role as The Cowardly Lion in an adaptation of the Royal Shakespeare Company's production of The Wizard Of Oz.

== Later years ==
In 2004, Hill was diagnosed with prostate cancer and underwent successful keyhole surgery. A year later, following a routine blood test, it was discovered he also had chronic myeloid leukaemia. Following extensive treatment, the illness was brought under control. His autobiography, Another Hill to Climb (Bank House Books), written in collaboration with Nick Charles, was released in 2010.

Hill came out of semi-retirement in April 2012 to make a successful return to the stage for one night only in which he performed in a big band night at Ronnie Scott's Jazz Club. Hill said, "It was an absolute success — we sold out and I got a standing ovation. At that point, I just thought, "I've finished, that'll do me."

Athol, Hill's only son, was found dead, aged 42, in January 2014. Hill and his wife Annie, who died in September 2016, lived at their Oxfordshire home, close to the River Thames.

Hill came out of retirement again in March 2018, when he returned to the stage in The Good Old Days of Variety at the Cast in Doncaster. Later that year, in September, Hill appeared in his 'Final Farewell Show' at the Kenton Theatre in Henley-on-Thames. In December 2018, Hill was billed to host an event celebrating the BFI's Missing Believed Wiped at 25 at BFI Southbank.

In December 2019, it was reported that Hill was to play Baron Hard-Up in Cinderella 2 – The Mrs Charming Years at the Kenton Theatre in Henley-on-Thames. Hill became a Patron of the Macular Society in October 2010. Hill suffered from AMD from 2011; this was a major reason for his reluctantly retiring from live performances. In support of the society, Hill donated all proceeds from sales of his Legacy greatest hits CD to the society to help beat macular disease. He also released a limited edition 2021 charity calendar, with proceeds going to the Macular Society. In August 2021, it was revealed via Twitter that he had recently suffered a stroke.

Hill died at home in Henley-on-Thames on 22 July 2023, at the age of 89.

== Discography ==
=== Original albums ===
at EMI Columbia

- Have You Met Vince Hill (1966)
- Heartaches (1966)
- Edelweiss UK Albums Chart No. 23
- Always You and Me (1967)
- The Sweetest Sounds of Rodgers & Hammerstein (1968)
- You Forgot to Remember (1968)
- The Singer and the Songs (1971)
- Look Around (1971)
- In My Thoughts of You (1972)
- And I Love You So (1972)

at EMI

- They Sold a Million (1973)
- The Other Side of Me (1973)
- Thanks a Million (1974)
- Sing a Song of Sedaka (1974)

at CBS

- Mandy (1975)
- Wish You Were Here (1975)
- Midnight Blue (1976)

at K-tel

- That Loving Feeling (1978)

at Celebrity Records

- While The Feeling's Good (1980)
- Evergreen (1982)

at Grasmere Records

- I Will Always Love You (1983)

at Music For Pleasure

- Sings The Ivor Novello Songbook (1988)

at T.N.T.

- Forbidden Pleasures (1992)

at Pickwick Records

- Real Songs (Vince Hill Sings Diane Warren) (2003)

=== Live albums ===
- At The Club [Live Album] (1966)

=== Film soundtracks ===
- Cast A Giant Shadow (1966 Vinyl LP, United Artists)
- The Long Duel (1967 Vinyl LP, ATCO)
- Some May Live (1967, Although Hill recorded the title theme no Film Soundtrack was released)
- The Railway Children (1971 Vinyl LP, EMI)
- Under the Doctor (1976, Although Hill recorded the title theme no Film Soundtrack was released)

=== Compilation albums ===
- Vince Hill: Collection of Hill's early solo recordings with Piccadilly Records (1967 Vinyl LP, Marble Arch Records)
- Little Bluebird: featuring several new songs (1970 Vinyl LP EMI Regal)
- The Very Best of Vince Hill (1974 Vinyl LP, EMI)
- Vince Hill - His Greatest Hits (1988 Cassette & CD, EMI)
- The Very Best of Vince Hill (1988 Cassette & CD, EMI)
- The Best of The EMI Years (1992 CD, EMI)
- Laurie Johnson's London Big Band - Volume Two: Two songs featuring Vince Hill as a guest vocalist feature on this compilation (1996 CD, Horatio Nelson Records)
- Back 2 Back Hits - Vince Hill & Des O'Connor (1998 CD, EMI)
- Evergreen - Timeless Classics featuring re-recordings of hit singles (2004 2CD, President Records)
- Vince Hill - The Ultimate Collection (2006 CD, EMI)
- Edelweiss - The Very Best Of Vince Hill: A career-spanning boxset of original hit singles and other highlights (2006 3CD, Reader's Digest)
- Vince Hill - Edelweiss/Look Around (And You'll Find Me There): First of a CD series of original studio album re-issues (2017 CD, Cherry Red Records)
- Edelweiss: Songs from the Musicals (The 1990s Sessions) (2017 Download, Demon Music Group)
- Vince Hill - His Greatest Love Songs (The CBS Years): A romantic collection of Hill's CBS recordings made between 1975 and 1977 (2017 CD & Download, Sony Music)
- Legacy: My Hits & Rarities (1965-1974): A 55th anniversary collection featuring Hill's eleven top 50 UK singles of the time (2017 CD)
- The Lost Sessions: 1969-1991

=== Singles ===
Year	Title (Songwriters)	UK Singles Chart
1962	"The River's Run Dry" (Les Vandyke)	#41
1966	"Take Me to Your Heart Again" (Édith Piaf/Louis Guglielmi/Mack David)	#13
1966	"Heartaches" (Al Hoffman/John Clenner)	#28
1966	"Merci Cherie" (Udo Jürgens/Thomas Hörbiger)	#36
1967	"Edelweiss" (Richard Rodgers/Oscar Hammerstein II)	#2
1967	"Roses of Picardy" (Frederic E. Weatherly/Haydn Wood)	#13
1967	"Love Letters in the Sand" (J. Fred Coots/Nick Kenny/Charles Kenny)	#23
1968	"The Importance of Your Love" (Amade/Gilbert Bécaud/Norman Newell)	#32
1969	"Doesn't Anybody Know My Name?" (Rod McKuen)	#50
1969	"Little Blue Bird" (Vince Hill)	#42
1971	"Look Around (And You'll Find Me There)" (Francis Lai)	#12

== See also ==
- List of performers on Top of the Pops
