= Cyberduck (disambiguation) =

Cyberduck may refer to:

- Cyberduck, an open source FTP software
- Cyber-Duck, a digital media agency in North London
