= Nathalie (song) =

Single by Gilbert Bécaud
- A-side: "Nathalie"
- Released: 1964
- Genre: Chanson, pop
- Length: 4:07
- Songwriter(s): Gilbert Bécaud (music); Pierre Delanoë (lyrics)

Music video
- "Nathalie" (official live, 1964) "Nathalie" (official live, 1966) "Nathalie" (at the Olympia Hall, 1997) on YouTube

"Nathalie" is a 1964 song by French singer Gilbert Bécaud.

Its lyrics were written by Pierre Delanoë and its music composed by Gilbert Bécaud. The song was released in May 1964 and was a big success.

The song talks about the brief romance between a French visitor and a beautiful Soviet tourist guide. It is claimed that the song "Nathalie" reflected the beginning of reapprochement between France and the USSR.

In 1983, Bécaud sang a continuation of the story in "La Fille de Nathalie", with lyrics again written by Delanoë and music composed by Bécaud. The song is in the form of a letter by the teenage daughter born to the French tourist and his Soviet guide and also makes references to the hardships in the USSR at the time.

== Track listings ==
7" single (Electrola E 23 050, 45-EG 9536, West Germany, 1965)

1. Nathalie
2. L'orange

7" single (Columbia 12 266 X, 1964)

1. Nathalie (4:07)
2. Et maintenant (2:38)

7" single (Electrola E 23 046, West Germany, 1965)
7" single (Electrola / Ex Libris E 923 046, West Germany, 1965)

1. Nathalie (4:01) — German-language version
2. Nimm dir doch Zeit (3:09)

7" single (Netherlands, France)

1. Mon arbre
2. Nathalie

== Charts ==
Chart (1964–1965)	Peak position
Belgium (Ultratop 50 Flanders)	8
Germany	17
