= The Adventures of Rupert Bear =

British TV series (1970–1977)

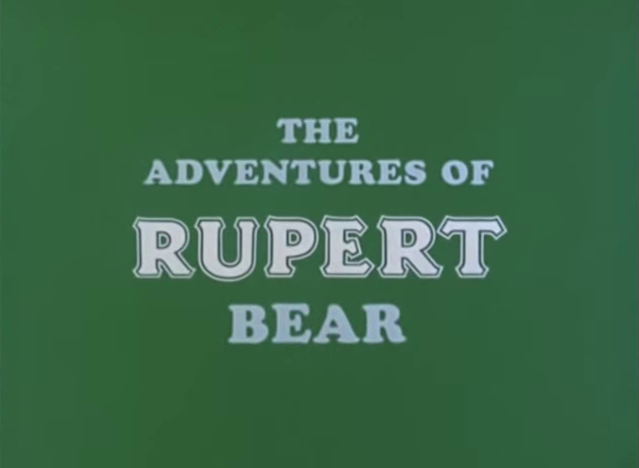
- Narrated by: Judy Bennett
- Theme music composer: Len Beadle and Ron Roker
- Opening theme: "Rupert the Bear" sung by Jackie Lee
- Country of origin: United Kingdom
- No. of series: 4
- No. of episodes: 156

Production
- Running time: 11 min.

Original release
- Network: ITV
- Release: 28 October 1970 – 24 August 1977

The Adventures of Rupert Bear (My Little Rupert in the United States) is a British live-action puppet television series, based on the Mary Tourtel character Rupert Bear, produced by ATV. It aired from 28 October 1970 to 24 August 1977 on the ITV network, with 156 eleven-minute episodes produced over four series, which received regular repeat screenings until 1981.

== Production ==
The characters were all puppets, although the opening sequence featured a toy version of Rupert Bear sitting in a live-action child's bedroom. Rupert's friends and flying chariot appeared just as they had in the pages of the Daily Express, although he was joined by some new friends, including a sprite called Willy Wisp. One of the most-remembered elements of the series was the theme song, which was written by Len Beadle and Ron Roker, sung by Jackie Lee, and reached No. 14 in the United Kingdom charts in 1971. The song includes the erroneous lyric "Rupert the Bear" (Rupert has never had the definite article in his name). The narrator of the stories was Judy Bennett.

== Archival status ==
Of the 156 episodes made, for many years only 75 were known to exist in their original colour film format, with a further 16 duplicated on black-and-white 16mm film. The remaining episodes were thought to be lost. On 21 April 2017, it was announced by the Network imprint that original film elements for all 156 episodes had been located, and were to be released on DVD in three volumes, with the first release comprising the earliest 52 episodes.

== Characters ==
- Rupert Bear — a little bear who lives near Nutwood village and likes adventures and helping people. He owns a flying go-kart – which he calls his magic chariot – and has a catchphrase "Wizardy whizz!"
- Mr. Bear — Rupert's father, who loves gardening and carpentry.
- Mrs. Bear — Rupert's mother, who loves to cook and often throws parties for Rupert and his friends.
- Willy Wisp — an occasionally mischievous but usually friendly and helpful sprite who gave Rupert’s go-kart the ability to fly. First appeared in 'Rupert and the Flying Chariot'.
- Bill Badger — a little badger and Rupert's best friend, who has accompanied him on more adventures than anyone else.
- Bobby Badger — Bill's baby brother. First appeared in 'Rupert and the Baby Badger'.
- Podgy Pig — a little pig who is always hungry and often greedy, but means well.
- Edward Trunk — a little elephant who is very strong and has a catchphrase "Trumpety trumps!".
- Pong-Ping — a Pekinese with Chinese origins.
- George — a little dragon and Pong-Ping's pet.
- P.C. Growler — the local constable who ensures law and order and always has time for a cup of tea.
- Margot — one of Rupert's closest friends, rather timid and likes animals. First appeared in 'Rupert and the Sky Boat'.
- Tiger Lily — a young girl with Chinese origins.
- The Chinese Conjuror — Tiger Lily's father, who possesses magic powers.
- Sailor Sam — a sailor who lives in a shack and is often away on sea trips.
- Gypsy Granny — a wise old gypsy who often gives Rupert advice in riddles. First appeared in 'Rupert and Raggety'.
- Rosalie Pig — Podgy's spoilt cousin. First appeared in 'Rupert and the Truant'.
- Ting Ling — Tiger Lily's cousin. First appeared in 'Rupert and the Crackerjack'.
- Raggety — a grumpy but good-hearted twig troll who feeds on wood. First appeared in 'Rupert and Raggety'.
- Santa Claus — a kind old man who delivers presents to the children of the world at Christmas.
- Jack Frost — Prince of the North Pole and in charge of ice and snow. First appeared in 'Rupert and the Snow Machine".
- The Snow Queen — Queen of the North Pole. First appeared in 'Rupert and the Winter Woolies'.
- Simple Simon — Formerly from Nursery Rhyme Land and not very clever. First appeared in 'Rupert and Unlucky Simon'.
- Mr. Grimnasty — the bad tempered Old Man of the Wood and Raggety's housemate. First appeared in 'Rupert and Raggety'.
- The Inventor — mad but well meaning scientist. First appeared in 'Rupert and the Blue Fireworks'.
- The Professor — sensible and clever scientist.
- The Wise Old Wizard — expert on spells and potions and humanised version of the Wise Old Goat in the original stories. First appeared in 'Rupert and the Baby Badger'.
- Farmer Termutt — local farmer. First appeared in 'Rupert and the Old Hat'.
- The Scarecrow — Farmer Termutt's walking talking scarecrow. Named Odmedod in the original stories but unnamed here.
- The Crow — a mischievous but sometimes helpful crow.
- Goosegog — a mischievous imp and friend of Raggety's, who loves practical jokes and has a head like a huge gooseberry. First appeared in 'Rupert and the Gooseberry Fool'.
- The Wizard of the Wind — head of the world’s weather. First appeared in 'Rupert and the Flying Chariot'.
- Drizzle — grumpy assistant to the Wizard of the Wind who likes to do odd jobs. He owns a magic sou'wester which can grow to three times its size and fly. First appeared in 'Rupert and the Flying Chariot'.
- Mother Dragon — George's mother. Lives with the Emperor of Games. First appeared in "Rupert and the Hiccuping Dragon".
- Great-Grandfather Dragon — George's great-grandfather. Lives with the Emperor of Games. First appeared in 'Rupert and the Dragon Sweets'.
- Mary-Mary Quite Contrary — character from nursery rhyme of the same name. First appeared in 'Rupert and Unlucky Simon'.
- Jack and Jill — characters from nursery rhyme of the same name. First appeared in 'Rupert and Unlucky Simon'.
- The Witch — a friendly witch whose spells often go awry. First appeared in 'Rupert and the Witch's Chariot'.
- Mr. & Mrs. Weather — weather people who live in a huge weather house in the sky and control the weather. First appeared in 'Rupert and the Newspapers'.
- Bianco and Bianca — two children who live in Cloud Land and look after the clouds. First appeared in 'Rupert in Cloud Land'.
- The Rabbit — a white rabbit who lives under Nutwood Common. First appeared in 'Rupert and the Moledigger'.
- The Spring Chicken — personal alarm clock for the Bird King. First appeared in 'Rupert and the Spring Chicken'.

== Episodes ==
=== Season 1 (1970) ===
1. Rupert and the Flying Chariot
2. Rupert and Raggety
3. Rupert and the Unknown
4. Rupert and the Blue Fireworks
5. Rupert and the Fishing Rod
6. Rupert and the Snow Machine
7. Rupert at Rocky Bay
8. Rupert and the Christmas Toffee
9. Rupert and the Spring Chicken
10. Rupert and Sky Boat
11. Rupert and the Paper Fall
12. Rupert and the Compass
13. Rupert and the Butterflies
14. Rupert and the Magic Ball
15. Rupert and the Basket Rocket
16. Rupert and the Green Buzzer
17. Rupert and the Blue Moon
18. Rupert in Mysteryland
19. Rupert and Margot
20. Rupert and the Snowman
21. Rupert and the Train Journey
22. Rupert and the Distant Music
23. Rupert and the Cold Cure
24. Rupert and the Ice Flowers
25. Rupert and the Old Hat
26. Rupert and the Inventor

=== Season 2 (1971) ===
1. Rupert and the Truant
2. Rupert and the Autumn Primrose
3. Rupert and the Baby Badger
4. Rupert and the Rope Ladder
5. Rupert and the Gooseberry Fool
6. Rupert and the Yellow Dog-Roses
7. Rupert and the Flying Saucer
8. Rupert and the Top Hat
9. Rupert and the Forest Fire
10. Rupert and the Crackerjack
11. Rupert and the Birthday Kettle
12. Rupert and the Snuff Box
13. Rupert and the Dragon Sweets
14. Rupert and the Elephants
15. Rupert and the Winter Woolies
16. Rupert and the Sketch-Book
17. Rupert and the Woffle Fly
18. Rupert and the Lost Chariot
19. Rupert and the Golden Acorn
20. Rupert and the Balloon
21. Rupert and the Spring Adventure
22. Rupert and the Missing Pieces
23. Rupert and the Outlaw
24. Rupert and Unlucky Simon
25. Rupert and Rusty
26. Rupert and the Old Chimney

=== Season 3 (1973) ===
1. Rupert and the Salt Queen
2. Rupert and the Falling Star
3. Rupert and the Piggy Bank
4. Rupert Gets a Message
5. Rupert and the Willow Patterned Plate
6. Rupert and the Moledigger
7. Rupert and the Witch’s Chariot
8. Rupert and the Dragon Feast
9. Rupert and the Scaredly Scarecrow
10. Rupert, Raggety and the Bricks
11. Rupert to the Rescue
12. Rupert and the New Star
13. Rupert and the One-Eyed Monster
14. Rupert and the Christmas Stocking
15. Rupert’s Christmas Party
16. Rupert at the Pantomime
17. Rupert and the Floating Water
18. Rupert in Rhyme Land
19. Rupert and the Magic Icicle
20. Rupert and Great Aunt Emily
21. Rupert and the Snow Guard
22. Rupert and the Chinese Kite
23. Rupert and the Wonderful Lamp
24. Rupert and the Forgetful Flowers
25. Rupert and the Thief
26. Rupert in Cloud Land
27. Rupert and the Goosegog Trap
28. Rupert and the Treasure Hunt
29. Rupert and the Jack-in-the-Box
30. Rupert in Space
31. Rupert and the Changing Weather
32. Rupert and the Troublesome Tent
33. Rupert and the Leaking Roof
34. Rupert and the Jigsaw Puzzle
35. Rupert and the Tightrope Walker
36. Rupert and the Roses
37. Rupert and the Poppies
38. Rupert and the Time Zone
39. Rupert and the Flying Sou'wester
40. Rupert and the Newspapers
41. Rupert on the Farm
42. Rupert and the Electronic Key
43. Rupert and the Holiday Adventure
44. Rupert and the Castaway
45. Rupert and the Princess
46. Rupert and Rosalie
47. Rupert and the Air Smugglers
48. Rupert and the Rainbow
49. Rupert and the Pothole
50. Rupert and the Seashell
51. Rupert and the Experiment
52. Rupert and the Pie Contest

=== Season 4 (1974) ===
1. Rupert and the Cyclone
2. Rupert and the Daffodil Telephone
3. Rupert and the Singing Birdseed
4. Rupert Turns Detective
5. Rupert and the Computer
6. Rupert Rescues Rosalie
7. Rupert and the Hiccuping Dragon
8. Rupert and the Upside-Down Tree
9. Rupert and the Giant Pancake
10. Rupert and the Sleepless Hedgehog
11. Rupert and the Man in the Moon
12. Rupert and the Red Mac
13. Rupert and the Lonely Pillar Box
14. Rupert and Nutwood Station
15. Rupert and the Fancy Dress Party
16. Rupert and the Sand Castle
17. Rupert and the Eskimo
18. Rupert and the Wool Gathering
19. Rupert and the Golden Egg
20. Rupert and the House That Never Was
21. Rupert and the Snow Cloud
22. Rupert and the Light Situation
23. Rupert and the New Neighbours
24. Rupert and the Buried Silver
25. Rupert and the Shoemaker's Son
26. Rupert and the Unusual Portrait
27. Rupert and Raggety's Birthday
28. Rupert and the Rope Trick
29. Rupert and Red Riding Hood
30. Rupert and the Crock of Gold
31. Rupert and the Knight
32. Rupert and the Easter Parade
33. Rupert and the New-Fangled Heater
34. Rupert and the White Christmas
35. Rupert and Little Jumping Joan
36. Rupert Goes Shopping Twice
37. Rupert and Mr. Grimnasty's New Home
38. Rupert and Tiger Lily
39. Rupert and the White Rabbit
40. Rupert and the Happy Families
41. Rupert and the Old Coat
42. Rupert and the Bedoozle Man
43. Rupert and the Helpful Time
44. Rupert and the Profusion Plant-Grower
45. Rupert and the Striped Digger
46. Rupert and the Nutwood Fair
47. Rupert and the Naughty Tinker
48. Rupert and the Old Mill
49. Rupert and the Good Deed
50. Rupert and the Late Winter
51. Rupert and the Professor's Problem
52. Rupert and Punch and Judy

== DVD release ==
In April 2017, Network announced it would be releasing the first 52 episodes from the first two series on DVD (Region 2, PAL format). http://networkonair.com/exclusives/2626-adventures-of-rupert-bear-the-volume-1

The set was made available only directly through Network's website.

A second volume containing the 52 episodes from series 3 was released soon afterward, again exclusive to the Network DVD website and in the same format. http://networkonair.com/exclusives/2686-adventures-of-rupert-bear-the-volume-2

Later, a third volume containing all 52 episodes from series 4 was released, once again exclusive to the Network DVD website and in the same format as the other volumes. http://networkonair.com/all-products/2715-adventures-of-rupert-bear-the-volume-3

All four series were later released as a complete set in October 2017, available from all major retailers.
