= Bob Miller and the Millermen =

Bob Miller and The Millermen was a British instrumental band of the 1950s, which appeared regularly on UK television and radio programmes in the 1950s and early 1960s, backing various singers and vocal groups. The band appeared as one of the resident bands on Drumbeat, along with The John Barry Seven, and supported The Kingpins for their nine appearances on the show. They also featured in another BBC Radio programme, Parade of the Pops. The players also temporarily served in other bands, for example for Norman Smith. Bob Miller cut various instrumental singles such as "Oliver's Twist" under the band's own name.

Bob Miller and the Millermen were also accompanied and backed by the 'Wimbledon Girls Choir', in various shows and on television, in the 1950s and 1960s under the musical conductor Malcolm Parker.

Elton John's father, Stanley Dwight, was a former member of the band.
