= Macular Society =

UK charity

The Macular Society is a UK charity that offers support to anyone affected by central vision loss.

Many of the charity's members have age-related macular degeneration (AMD), but its services are open to people with various retinal conditions, including myopic macular degeneration, diabetic retinopathy, and inherited retinal dystrophies like Stargardt disease, Best disease, and Sorsby fundus dystrophy.

The society coordinates activities across the UK from its headquarters in Andover, Hampshire. Its primary goal is to combat macular disease by funding research, providing a range of support services, and raising awareness of eye health.

== Services ==
To combat isolation, loneliness and mental ill-health among people with sight loss, the society provides several free services. These include:

- More than 400 local support groups
- Advice and Information Service
- Telephone counselling
- Skills training to help people remain independent
- Patient information in large-print, audio or electronic format.

== History ==
- The Macular Society was set up in 1987 by founder Elizabeth Thomas, who was affected by macular degeneration.
- At the start of 2013 the Society dropped the word disease from its name and updated its visual identity.
- Evidence from Macular Society members was instrumental in the tribunal which resulted in eye surgeon Bobby Qureshi being struck off the medical register. The General Medical Council heard that he had deliberately misled patients about the risks and benefits of surgery to implant artificial lenses into their eyes.
- Each year the Society recognises excellence in patient care and thanks its most dedicated volunteers with a series of awards.
- In 2020, the Macular Society was named the Association of Optometrists' Charity of the Year.

== Patrons ==
- Gemma Craven
- Henry Blofeld OBE
- Gwyn Dickinson MBE
- Patricia Greene
- Vince Hill
- Maggie Norden
- Zac Shaw

Former patrons include Peter Sallis, Denis Norden and Eric Sykes.
