= Gilbert Bécaud =

French singer, composer, pianist and actor (1927–2001)

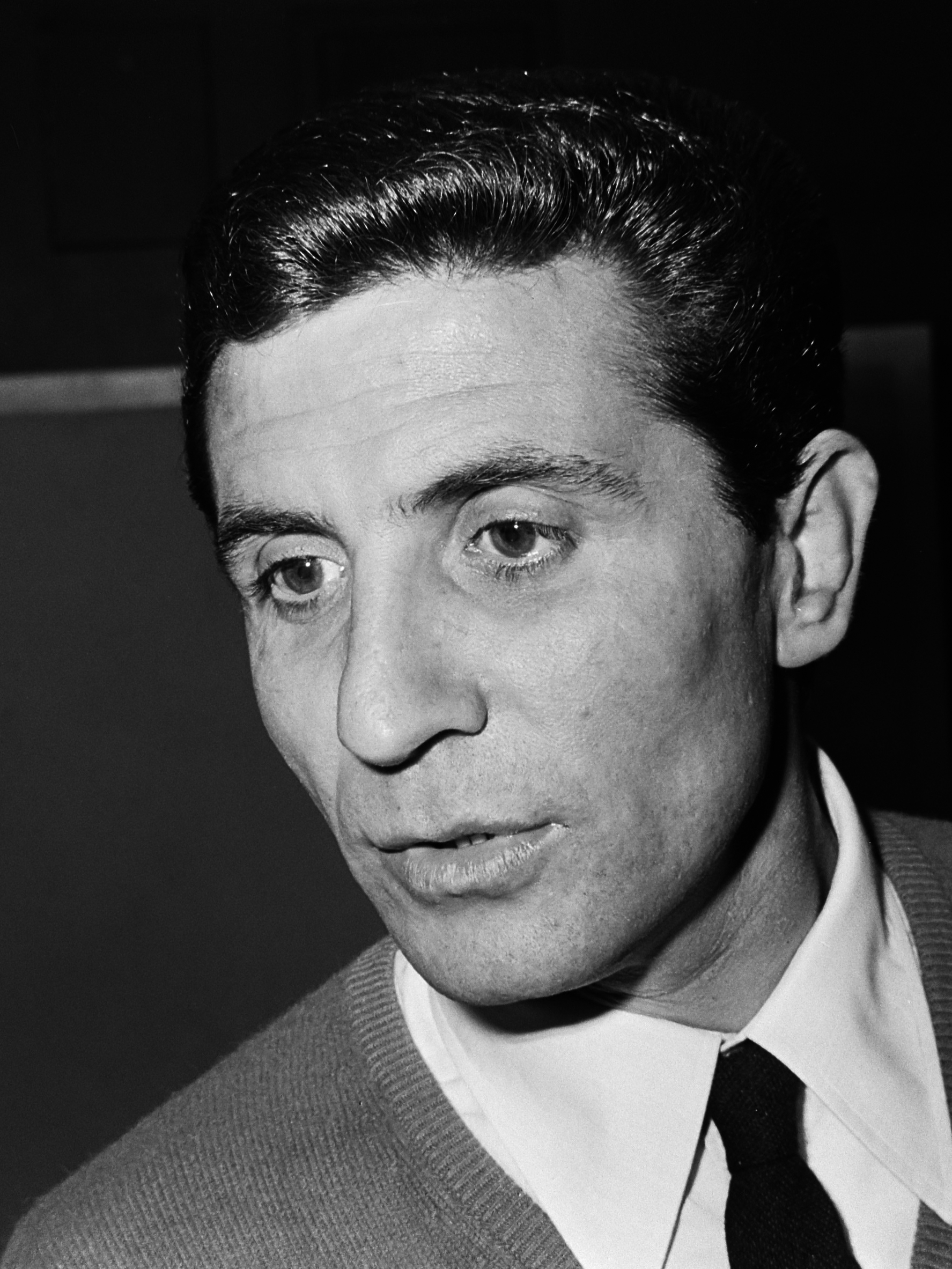
- Bécaud in 1965
- Born: François Gilbert Léopold Silly; 24 October 1927; Toulon, France
- Died: 18 December 2001 (aged 74); Boulogne-Billancourt, France
- Spouses: Monique Nicholas (m. 1952, divorced) Kitty Saint-John (m. 1973)
- Children: 5
- Musical career
- Also known as: Monsieur 100,000 Volts
- Genres: Contemporary music, jazz
- Occupations: Musician; Composer; Actor
- Instruments: Vocals, guitar, piano
- Years active: 1948–2001

François Gilbert Léopold Silly (24 October 1927 – 18 December 2001), known professionally as Gilbert Bécaud (French pronunciation: [ʒilbɛʁ beko]), was a French singer, composer, pianist and actor, known as "Monsieur 100,000 Volts" for his energetic performances. His best-known hits are "Nathalie" and "Et maintenant", a 1961 release that became an English language hit as "What Now My Love". He remained a popular artist for nearly fifty years, identifiable in his dark blue suits, with a white shirt and "lucky tie"; blue with white polka dots. When asked to explain his gift he said, "A flower doesn't understand botany." His favourite venue was the Paris Olympia under the management of Bruno Coquatrix. He debuted there in 1954 and headlined in 1955, attracting 6,000 on his first night, three times the capacity. On 13 November 1997, Bécaud was present for the re-opening of the venue after its reconstruction.

== Biography ==
Born in Toulon, France, Bécaud learned to play the piano at a young age, and then went to the Conservatoire de Nice. In 1942, he left school to join the French Resistance during World War II. He began songwriting in 1948, after meeting Maurice Vidalin, who inspired him to write his early compositions. He began writing for Marie Bizet; Bizet, Bécaud and Vidalin became a successful trio, and their partnership lasted until 1950.

In 1952, he married Monique Nicholas. They had three children.

While touring with Jacques Pills as a pianist, Bécaud met Édith Piaf, Pills' wife at the time. He began singing at her suggestion in 1953, with "Mes Mains" and "Les Croix". His first performance came the year after. His hits in the later part of the decade included "La Corrida" (1956), "Le Jour où la Pluie Viendra" (1957), and "C'est Merveilleux L'amour" (1958).

His first hit in the English-speaking world was Jane Morgan's cover version of "Le jour où la pluie viendra" (as "The Day the Rains Came", with English lyrics by Carl Sigman) in 1958. He began acting in the same period, starting with "Le Pays D'où Je Viens" (1956). In 1960, he won a Grand Prix du Disque and composed "L'enfant à L'étoile," a Christmas cantata. That same year, "Let It Be Me", an English version of his "Je t'appartiens", became a hit for the Everly Brothers, followed, over the years, by Bob Dylan, Nina Simone, Elvis Presley, The 5th Dimension, Willie Nelson, Jerry Butler, Sam & Dave and James Brown.

In 1973 he married Kitty Saint-John, with whom he had two children. He died of cancer at the age of 74.

== Career from 1960 ==
In 1961, Bécaud wrote and recorded "Et Maintenant", one of the biggest selling singles in French history. Translated as "What Now My Love", the song became a hit by Shirley Bassey, Sonny & Cher, Elvis Presley, Judy Garland, Andy Williams, Herb Alpert and Frank Sinatra.

In 1962, he completed his largest composition, the 2-act opera L'Opéra d'Aran, which was premiered at the Théâtre des Champs-Élysées on 25 October 1962 (Georges Prêtre conductor). The plot of the opera takes place on the Aran Islands, off the west coast of Ireland, although Bécaud had never been to Ireland before.

After the opera's performances, he toured Europe and continued recording a string of pop music hits, including "Crois-moi ça durera" and "Tu le regretteras". He also co-wrote "Love on the Rocks" with Neil Diamond, which was featured on the soundtrack of The Jazz Singer and was an international hit. In addition, he co-wrote "September Morn" with Diamond. Other songs he co-wrote with Diamond on the album "The Jazz Singer" were "Summerlove", "On the Robert E. Lee","Hey Louise" and "Songs of Life".

Marlene Dietrich recorded his "Marie, Marie" and performed it in her stage shows.

He wrote the song "Nathalie" to the text by Pierre Delanoë about a female Moscow guide in 1964. Bécaud visited Moscow in 1965 allegedly invited by students. The Czech writer Bohumil Doležal commented that the song described the guide as a KGB officer. A Russian blogger claimed that guides reported to KGB officers. The song was used to soften the image of the Soviet Union, despite Pierre Delanoë's anti-Soviet views.

His song "Seul sur son étoile" became "It Must Be Him" (with English lyrics by Mack David), a hit in 1967 for the American singer Vikki Carr, and the following year another Bécaud song, "L'important c'est la rose" was given an English lyric (by Norman Newell) and became a hit for the British singer Vince Hill under the title "Importance of Your Love".

On 19 June 1968, the American Broadcasting Company aired a half-hour colour special starring Bécaud that had been taped in Saarbrücken. Bécaud performed "Nathalie", "Mademoiselle Lise" and "The Day the Rains Came" and sang a duet with Inge Brück, "Sand and Sea". The programme also featured performances by João Gilberto, Lill Lindfors and Hans Koller.

Bécaud turned his focus more toward touring than recording in the 1970s. An example was his live performance at the festival The Golden Orpheus in June 1971 in Communist Bulgaria. He followed this with some acting work and at last finally took time off in 1973, citing exhaustion. In 1974, he was named Chevalier in the Légion d'honneur. The following year, he scored his one and only entry on the UK Singles Chart with "A Little Love and Understanding", which reached number 10 in the spring. The song also became his first and only chart hit in Australia, reaching number 19 in the winter. Later in the century, he began writing with Pierre Grosz and then Neil Diamond, also penning the Broadway musical Roza with Julian More.

In 1982, he recorded the duet "L'Amour est mort" with Québécoise singer Martine St. Clair at the start of her career.

The 1980s and 1990s, saw a slowdown of Bécaud's activity. He released various compilations and toured occasionally.

On 18 December 2001, he died from lung cancer, aged 74, on his houseboat on the Seine, and was interred in Père Lachaise Cemetery in Paris. Bécaud's song catalogue, running to around 450 songs, is published by BMG Music Publishing.

Bécaud's song "L'Orange" was the featured track in one of the trailers of the movie Léon (aka The Professional) by Luc Besson.

== Discography ==
=== Albums ===
==== Studio albums ====
- 1953 : Gilbert Bécaud et ses chansons
- 1954 : Young Man of Paris in Moods of Love (recorded in New York)
- 1955 : Récital N° 1 – Mes grands succès
- 1956 : Alors raconte
- 1958 : Salut les copains
- 1959 : Pilou... Pilou... hé
- 1961 : Tête de bois
- 1962 : Le Bateau blanc
- 1964 : Le Pianiste de Varsovie
- 1969 : L'Un d'entre eux inventa la mort
- 1972 : Gilbert raconte et Bécaud chante
- 1974 : Hier et aujourd'hui
- 1975 : Je t'aime mon frère
- 1976 : L'Amour c'est l'affaire des gens
- 1978 : C'est en septembre
- 1980 : Moi, je veux chanter
- 1981 : Bonjour la vie
- 1984 : On attend, on attend
- 1987 : Le Retour
- 1989 : Fais-moi signe
- 1993 : Une vie comme un roman
- 1996 : Ensemble
- 1999 : Faut faire avec

==== Live albums ====
- 1955–2002: 15 different albums all live at Olympia

Plus rarities:

- 1957 : À l'Olympia – no 2
- 1971 : Récital du festival de l'Orphée d'or 71 (Bulgarian release, with 4 more tracks by Jennifer)
- 1978 : Au Québec – Récital en direct du Grand Théâtre de Québec
- 2013 : Concerts inédits 1956–1958

==== Operas, musical comedies, compositions ====
- 1960 : L'Enfant à l’Étoile (cantate de Noël) (with Orchestre Philharmonique, and choir of ORTF)
- 1962 : L'Opéra d'Aran – (2-act opera, music by Bécaud. But he didn't sing on the tracks)
- 1965 : Concerto pour piano
- 1972 : La Répétition
- 1976 : Heureux comme un poisson dans l'eau (publicité)
- 1986 : Roza (musical)
- 1992 : Aran Opéra (double CD on RCA/BMG, recorded live in 1966, sung by Bécaud)

==== Soundtracks ====
- 1971 : La Maison sous les arbres (instrumental)
- 2007 : Roman de gare

==== Compilations ====
- 1959 : Croquemitoufle (compilation 1953–1958)
- 1988 : Bécaulogie (9 CD collection)
- 1997 : Bécolympia (2 CDs, 38 tracks live, 1955–1983)
  - 2003: Bécolympia (re-released with different order of track list and 1 more bonus)
- 2002 : 50 Ans en Chansons (Long box 3 CDs, many unreleased materials)
- 2004 : 100 Chansons d'or (4 CDs, with 6 unreleased tracks)
- 2009 : Best of (3 CDs, 49 tracks)
- 2011 : Best of Eternel (2 CDs, 46 tracks remastered)
- 2011 : Anthologie Gilbert Becaud 1953–1959 (edited by Frémeaux & Associés – 2 CDs, 36 tracks chosen by André Bernard)
- 2011 : Essentiel (12 CD box, 9 studio albums remastered, plus best singles + 2 CDs live (Best of Olympia 1955–1983) + 1 CD of bonus tracks + 64-page booklet of text and rare photos)
- 2012 : Best of 3 CD (live at l'Olympia + the album Une vie comme un roman + parts from album Ensemble and Fais-moi signe + 3 bonus tracks in German, Sony Music release)
- 2012 : 100 Chansons (4 CDs, with 8 unreleased tracks from a concert at L’Olympia in 1960)

=== Singles ===
Emblematic songs and compositions:

==== 1950s ====
- "Mes mains"
- "Les Croix"
- "Mé qué mé qué"
- "Les enfants oubliés"
- "Je t'appartiens"
- "Les Marchés de Provence"
- "Le jour où la pluie viendra"
- "La Ballade des baladins"
- "Salut les copains"

==== 1960s ====
- "Et maintenant"
- "(Âge tendre et) Tête de bois"
- "Dimanche à Orly"
- "Quand Jules est au violon"
- "Nathalie"
- "L'Orange"
- "Quand il est mort le poète"
- "L'important c'est la rose"
- "Je reviens te chercher"

==== 1970s ====
- "C'est en septembre"
- "La Solitude ça n'existe pas"
- "L'Indifférence"
- "Un peu d'amour et d'amitié"

==== 1980s ====
- "Désirée"
- "L'Amour est mort"
- "Faut faire avec"

=== International / local versions ===
- 1955: "Je t'appartiens" / "Let It Be Me" (Pierre Delanoë – Gilbert Bécaud)
- 1957: "Le Jour où la pluie viendra" / "The Day the Rains Came" (Pierre Delanoë – Gilbert Bécaud)
- 1961: "Et maintenant" / "What Now My Love" (Pierre Delanoë – Gilbert Bécaud – Elvis Presley)
- 1966: "Seul sur son étoile" / "It Must Be Him" (Maurice Vidalin – Gilbert Bécaud)
- 1966: "Plein soleil" / "Sand and Sea" (Maurice Vidalin – Gibert Bécaud)
- 1967: "L'important c'est la rose" / "The Importance of Your Love" (Louis Amade - Gilbert Bécaud)
- 1972: "Un peu d'amour et d'amitié" / "A Little Love and Understanding" (Louis Amade – Gilbert Bécaud)
- 1979: "C'est en septembre" / "September Morn" (Neil Diamond – Gilbert Bécaud)

== Filmography ==
- 1953: Boum sur Paris as Himself
- 1956: The Country I Come From as Eric Perceval / Julien Barrère
- 1957: Casino de Paris as Jacques Merval
- 1959: Croquemitoufle as Bernard Villiers
- 1960: In 80 Takten um die Welt (TV film)
- 1962: Girl on the Road as an Air France pilot
- 1973: Un homme libre as Henri Lefèvre
- 1974: Toute une vie as Himself
- 1995: Navarro as Sarkis (French TV series)

== Bibliography ==
- Paul-Xavier Giannoli: Bécaud. Seul sur son étoile (Paris: Librairie Saint-Germain-des-Prés, 1970)
- Bernard Reval: Becaud: L'Homme à la cravate à pois (Lattès: Les Éditions du Voyage, 1995), ISBN 2-9509272-0-3
- Kitty Bécaud, Laurent Balandras: Bécaud. La Première idole (Paris: Éditions Didier Carpentier, 2011), ISBN 978-2-84167-749-8
