= Drumbeat (TV series) =

- Album cover
- Theme music composer: John Barry
- Country of origin: United Kingdom
- Original language: English
- No. of episodes: 22 (all missing)

Production
- Producer: Stewart Morris
- Production location: London
- Running time: 30 minutes

Original release
- Network: BBC
- Release: 4 April – 29 August 1959

Drumbeat is a BBC television series that aired every Saturday from 4 April to 29 August 1959. It was the BBC's answer and rival to ITV's TV series Oh Boy!, though as the latter finished on 30 May 1959, for most of its run Drumbeat had no comparable competition.

The series was a successor to BBC's Six-Five Special and Dig This!

== Featured musicians ==
It launched the careers of singer Adam Faith and composer John Barry, songwriters Les Reed, Johnny Worth (alias Les Vandyke) and Trevor Peacock. Among its guest stars were Petula Clark, the Lana Sisters (including Dusty Springfield), Billy Fury, Dickie Valentine, Paul Anka, Cliff Richard and Anthony Newley.

The show had a number of resident bands and singers: Emile Ford, Bob Miller and the Millermen, the John Barry Seven, Vince Eager, Sylvia Sands and Adam Faith. Danny Williams, the Raindrops (featuring Jackie Lee), the Kingpins, and Roy Young also appeared regularly and Trevor Peacock was the compere for 16 of the 22 episodes.

The producer-director was Stewart Morris, who went on to enjoy a long career in television. For a while, he was married to resident singer Sylvia Sands.

== Recordings ==
The series was broadcast live with the exception of the episode of 18 July, which was telerecorded. None of the episodes are known to have survived.

In June 2010, Silva Screen Records released a CD comprising the original LP and EP recorded in 1959, together with a few related tracks.
