= Kenton Theatre =

Theatre in Henley-on-Thames, England

- The Kenton
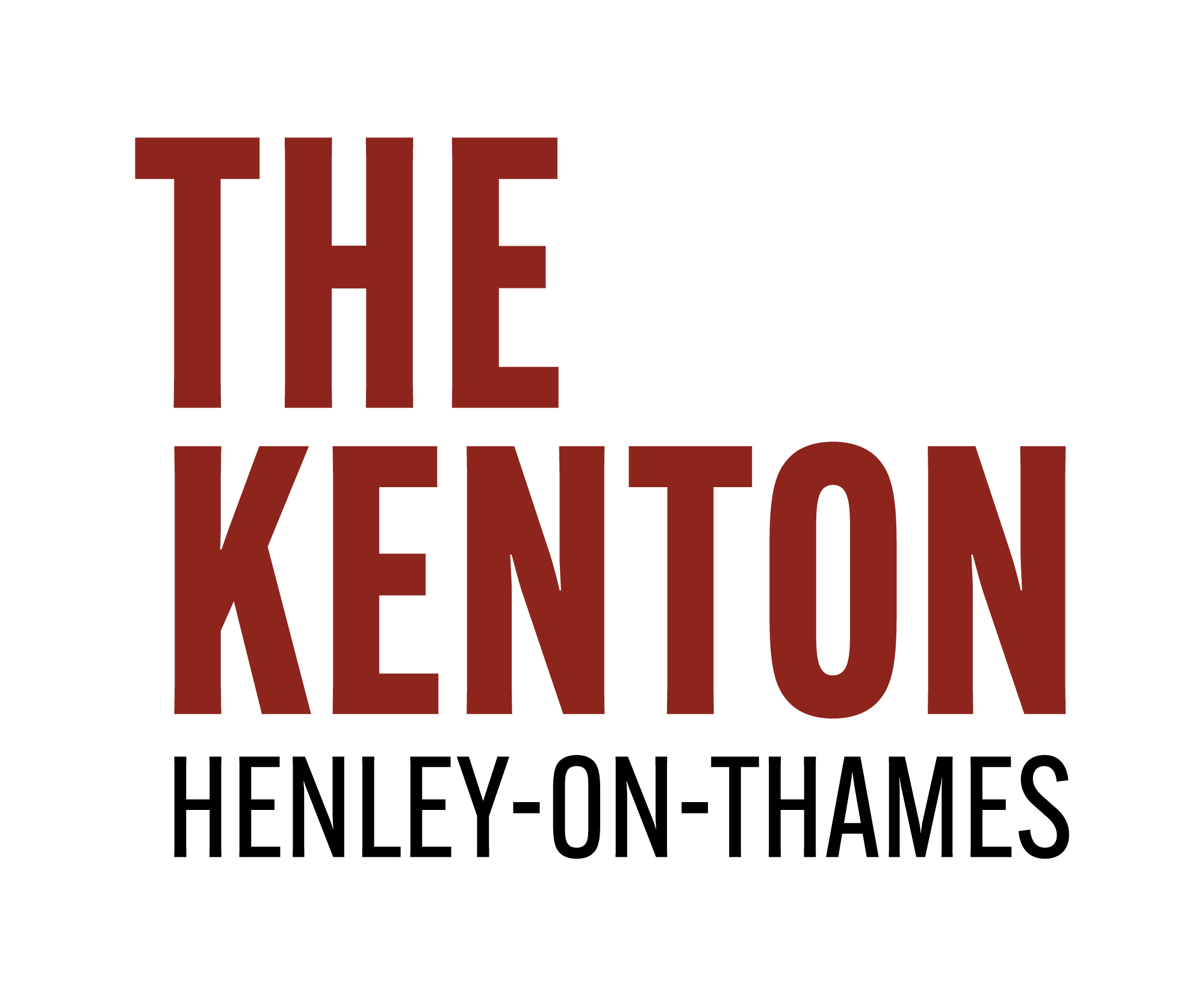

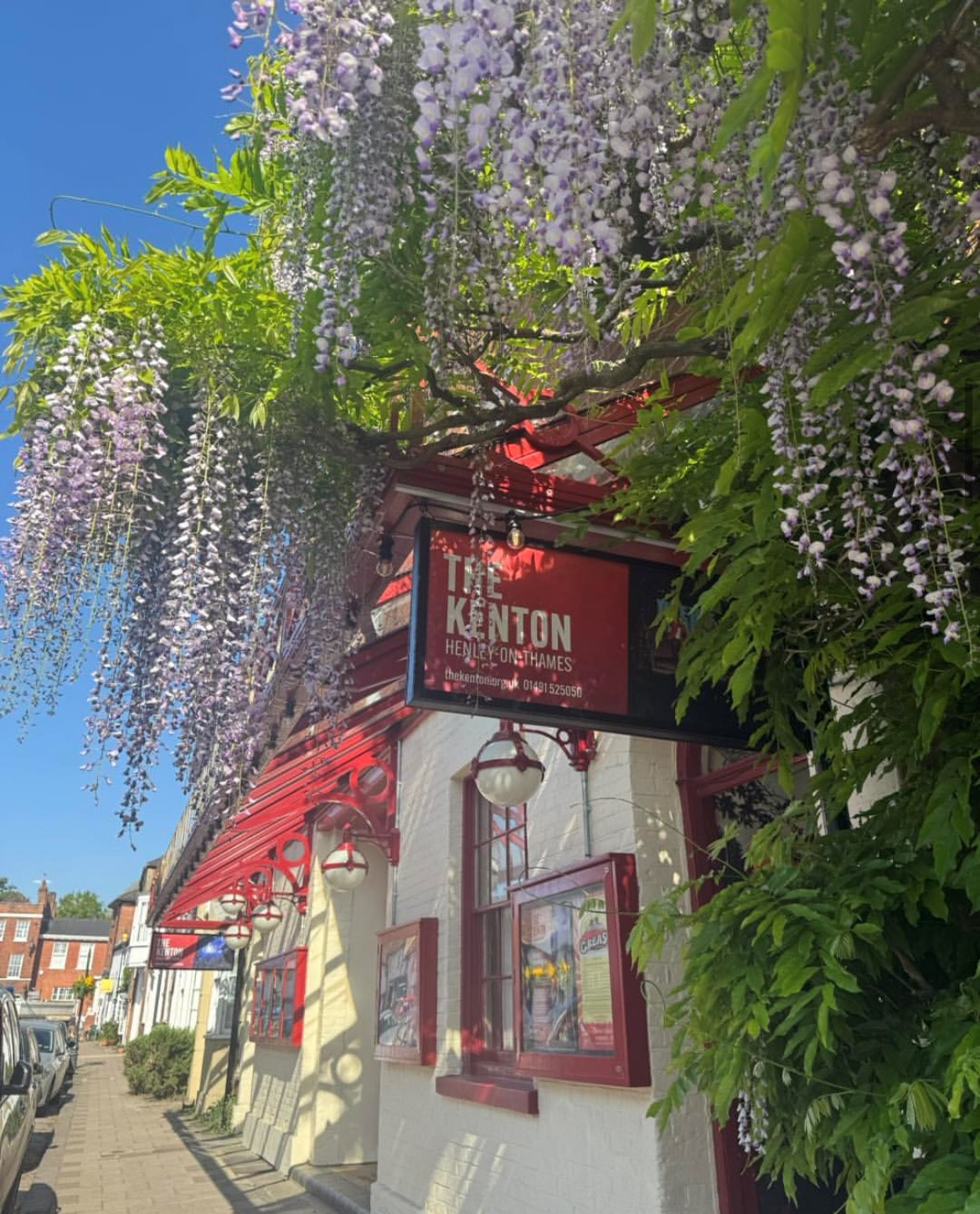
- The theatre in Spring 2025
- Interactive map of Kenton Theatre
- Full name: The Kenton Theatre
- Address: 19 New Street; Henley-on-Thames RG9; United Kingdom
- Location: Henley-on-Thames
- Coordinates: 51.5392°N 0.9027°W
- Operator: The Kenton Theatre Management Society
- Capacity: 240
- Designation: Grade II listed
- Parking: None - street parking out front, Waitrose nearby and Henley RFC nearby

Construction
- Opened: 7 November 1805
- Rebuilt: 1967

Website
- kentontheatre.co.uk -->

Listed Building – Grade II
- Official name: Kenton Theatre
- Designated: 28 October 1974
- Reference no.: 1047777

The Kenton Theatre is a theatre and Grade II listed building in the town of Henley-on-Thames, Oxfordshire, England.

== History ==
The Kenton Theatre was opened on 7 November 1805 by John Jonas and Sampson Penley, with a performance of Thomas Morton's The School of Reform, or How to Rule a Husband, which had been premiered that year in London. Jonas and Penley first toured their theatre group into Henley in 1798, performing at the Broad Gates Inn.

In 1805 The following notice was posted to publicise the opening of the theatre:

"Messrs Jonas and Penley beg leave most respectfully to inform the Nobility, Gentry and others of Henley, and its vicinity, that they have erected, for their accommodation and amusement, a Theatre, equal (if not superior) in convenience and decorations to any of its size in England. The whole of the theatre is designed, planned and executed, under the direction of Mr Parker, builder of Henley. The painting by Mr Mortram of the Theatre Royal, Drury Lane."

The site of the Kenton Theatre was bequeathed to a local businessman, Robert Kenton in 1503 by his friend John Andrew. Robert Kenton subsequently left the plot of land on New Street, Henley-on-Thames to the Town Council whereupon it sat empty until a site for the theatre was to be chosen. The theatre opened as The New Theatre, then closed in 1813 following audience decline and financial difficulty.

In 1817 the site was converted into a National and Industrial School, and operated as such until 1849 when a purpose built school opened in Henley. The building was used as a dissenting chapel before the site was consecrated as a church when the nearby St Mary's Church closed for refurbishment. By 1852, it was used as a wash house. The building then saw a range of different uses before re-opening as a theatre called St Mary's Hall in 1892. St Mary's Hall closed down in 1903 and the lease reverted to Henley Town Council.

In 1904 Henley Town Council decided to change the name of St Mary's Hall to The Kenton Hall, in honour of Robert Kenton and re-opened it as a theatre, which closed down again in 1910. In 1930 the lease was taken over by Henley Royal Operatic and Dramatic Society and reopened The Kenton Hall.

For the next few years the theatre was renamed by each local amateur society who performed there. HRAODS performed at The New Theatre, The Rangers performed at Kenton Hall and The Thames Players performed at The Henley Theatre. In 1931 Cecil Austin opened a revue season at what he called The Kenton Theatre, featuring 'The Great Ralleano the Boy Wonder' and 'The Swastika Syncopators.' Business was good and Austin made several improvements to the building before closing again.

In 1938 Sidney Foster and The Henley Players reopened the site as The New Playhouse, presenting Henley's first pantomime: Dick Whittington and His Cat. Business suffered during World War Two and The New Playhouse closed in 1945.

In 1951 the lease was purchased by John Piper and Dr Alan Hartley, and the Kenton Theatre opened. Piper was a renowned artist and carried out a range of design and refurbishment work including rebuilding and repainting the proscenium arch. In 1952 he collaborated with the choreographer John Cranko to provide a season of ballet with six dancers. However, the theatre fell into disrepair in the following years and was closed down by fire officers in 1963.

It reopened in 1967, managed by The Kenton Theatre (Henley-on-Thames) Management Society Ltd. Beginning that year, Cameron Mackintosh and Robin Alexander produced five plays at the theatre and in 1968 Pat Matthews of Cassell Arenz & Co cleared the Society's significant overdraft on the condition that Kenton theatre was in future to be managed on a voluntary basis by members of Henley Amateur Operatic Society. This arrangement continued until 2000 when the lease was purchased by The Kenton Theatre Management Society and the Kenton Theatre was run as a professional theatre. In 2010 KTMS raised £350,000 with the support of the local community to purchase the freehold of the building.

In 1974 the building was Grade II listed by Historic England.

In 1978, the theatre was the venue for an edition of the BBC Radio 4 programme With Great Pleasure in which John Mortimer first presented a selection of stories and poems which he later used as the basis for An evening with John Mortimer.

== Modern theatre ==
In 2015, the foyer of the theatre was refurbished and the reopening was marked by performances of Tell Me on a Sunday by Marti Webb.

The Kenton Theatre auditorium currently seats 240 people in total, with 185 in the stalls and 55 in the circle and presents a diverse programme of professional productions and local community performances. It is claimed that numerous ghosts are resident at the theatre, including Mary Blandy.
