= L'important c'est la rose =

Song by Gilbert Bécaud
- Language: French
- Released: 1967
- Genre: Chanson
- Songwriters: Louis Amade, Gilbert Bécaud

"L'important c'est la rose" is a song written by Louis Amade and Gilbert Bécaud. Gilbert Bécaud recorded a version, which was released in 1967.

== Other recordings ==
- 1967 : Tino Rossi (Columbia ESVF 1082)
- 1967 : Grethe & Jørgen Ingmann in Danish as gi' mig en rose
- 1967 : Östen Warnerbring in Swedish as Glöm ej bort det finns rosor
- 1967 : Amália Rodrigues (Columbia ESRF 1872)
- 1967 : Riccardo del Turco in Italian as L'importante è la rosa
- 1967 : Helena Vondráčková in Czech as Ruže kvetou dál
- 1968 : Gilbert Bécaud & Françoise Hardy duet as L'important c'est la rose for the Movie Monte Carlo: C'est La Rose
- 1969 : Gilbert Bécaud in Spanish as Lo importante es la rosa
- 1975 : Gilbert Bécaud in English as The Importance of Your Love
- 1977 : BZN in French
- 1976 : Jane Olivor in English and French as L’important c’est la rose
- 1978 : Hildegard Knef in German as Überall blühen Rosen
- 1980 : Kuh Ledesma in Filipino as Bulaklak
- 1989 : Philippine Madrigal Singers in English
- 2010 : Vicky Leandros in German as Doch ich seh all die Rosen
- 2016 : Raquel Bitton English version

The Östen Warnerbring recording charted at Svensktoppen for eight weeks between 18 February-21 April 1968, peaking at 2nd position.
