= CACI =

American defense contractor

CACI International Inc.
- Formerly: California Analysis Center, Inc. (1962-1967); Consolidated Analysis Center, Inc. (1967-1973)
- Type: Public
- Traded as: NYSE: CACI; S&P 400 component
- Industry: Information technology Consulting; Outsourcing; Defense
- Founded: July 1962; 64 years ago (Santa Monica, California)
- Founders: Herb Karr; Harry Markowitz
- Headquarters: Reston, Virginia, U.S.
- Key people: Lisa S. Disbrow (Chair); John Mengucci (President and CEO)
- Revenue: ▲US$9.6 billion (2026)
- Operating income: ▲US$919.8 million (2026)
- Net income: ▲US$535.8 million (2026)
- Number of employees: 27,000 (2026)
- Website: caci.com

CACI International Inc. (originally California Analysis Center, Inc., then Consolidated Analysis Center, Inc., and often known simply as CACI) is an American multinational aerospace and defense company headquartered in Northern Virginia. CACI provides services to many branches of the US federal government including defense, homeland security, and intelligence.

CACI has approximately 27,000 employees worldwide.

CACI is a member of the Fortune 500 list, the Russell 1000 Index, and the S&P MidCap 400 Index.

== History ==
=== 20th century ===
CACI was founded by Herb Karr and Harry Markowitz, who left RAND Corporation in 1962 to commercialize the SIMSCRIPT simulation programming language. The company went public in 1968. "CACI", which was originally an acronym for "California Analysis Center, Incorporated", was changed to stand for "Consolidated Analysis Center, Incorporated" in 1967. In 1973, the acronym alone was adopted as the firm's official name; reflecting the name customers had grown familiar with.

Their CACI Limited (UK) subsidiary was founded in 1975.

From 1984 the company was led by CEO Jack London, a former US naval engineer, who later became chairman and died in 2021.

=== 21st century ===
In February 2020, CACI announced the hiring of former White House staffer Daniel Walsh as corporate strategic adviser and senior vice president.

In April 2022, CACI announced that it had been awarded the Gold Edison Award, for its critical data dark web analysis intelligence platform DarkBlue.

=== Acquisitions ===
CACI's growth has been predominantly via acquisitions of other IT companies.

- 2003: Premier Technology Group, Inc.
- 2004: MTL Systems, Inc.
- 2004: CMS Information Services, Inc.
- 2004: American Management Systems, Inc. (Defense and Intelligence Group)
- 2005: National Security Research, Inc.
- 2006: Information Systems Support, Inc.
- 2006: AlphaInsight Corp.
- 2007: Institute for Quality Management, Inc.
- 2007: The Wexford Group International
- 2007: Athena Innovative Solutions, Inc.
- 2007: Areté Software Ltd (CACI Ltd.)
- 2007: Dragon Development Corporation
- 2008: SoftSmart Ltd (CACI Ltd.)
- 2009: EzGov Europe (CACI Ltd.)
- 2009: Monitor Media (CACI Ltd.)
- 2010: SystemWare, Inc.
- 2010: TechniGraphics, Inc.
- 2010: Applied Systems Research, Inc.
- 2011: Pangia Technologies, LLC
- 2011: Paradigm Holdings, Inc.
- 2011: Advanced Programs Group, LLC
- 2012: Delta Solutions and Technologies, Inc.
- 2012: Tomorrow Communications.
- 2012: Emergint Technologies, Inc.
- 2013: IDL Solutions, Inc.
- 2013: Six3 Systems, Inc.
- 2015: Rockshore Group Ltd (CACI Ltd.)
- 2016: L-3 National Security Solutions, Inc. (L-3 NSS)
- 2016: Purple Secure Systems (CACI Ltd.)
- 2016: Stream:20 (CACI Ltd.)
- 2017: Spargonet (CACI Ltd.)
- 2017: Mapmechanics (CACI Ltd.)
- 2018: CSRA LLC (Systems Engineering and Acquisition Services Business Unit from GDIT)
- 2019: LGS Innovations
- 2019: MooD International Software Limited (CACI Ltd.)
- 2019: Deep3 (CACI Ltd.)
- 2019: Next Century Corporation
- 2021: Bluestone Analytics
- 2023: Bitweave Ltd (CACI Ltd.)
- 2023: Cyber-Duck Ltd (CACI Ltd.)
- 2024: Rowe IT (CACI Ltd.)
- 2024: Applied Insight
- 2024: Azure Summit Technology
- 2026: ARKA Group

=== Internal growth ===
CACI's SIMSCRIPT software product line added object-oriented capability, and added a new government contracting area: Space.

== Controversies ==
=== Abu Ghraib ===
On June 9, 2004, a group of 256 Iraqis sued CACI International and Titan Corporation (now L-3 Services, part of L-3 Communications) in U.S. federal court regarding CACI's alleged involvement in the Abu Ghraib torture and prisoner abuse. Details are still, in 2019, under review by authorities, and also as of 2023, where a judge refused CACI's 18th dismissal request.

A 2017 story in The Washington Post reported that "a group of former Iraqi detainees got to make the case before a judge ... that they were tortured and that the contractor CACI International is partly to blame."

As of April 2024, an Alexandria, Virginia federal civil jury was deliberating whether to hold CACI liable for its employees' torture of three Iraqi citizens at Abu Ghraib. In November 2024, a jury awarded a total of US$42 million to the plaintiffs.

== Competitors ==
Depending on the focus (USA, International), competitors to CACI include Accenture, Booz Allen Hamilton, Capgemini, Infosys, Leidos, and Science Applications International Corporation.

== See also ==
- Top 100 US Federal Contractors
- Espionage
- Counterespionage
