= Cyber-Duck =

Digital media agency in North London

- Company type: Private
- Industry: Digital media
- Founded: 2005
- Founder: Danny Bluestone
- Headquarters: Elstree, Hertfordshire, UK
- Area served: Worldwide
- Key people: Danny Bluestone, Matt Gibson, Sylvain Reiter
- Owner: Danny Bluestone
- Number of employees: 90+
- Parent: CACI
- Website: www.cyber-duck.co.uk

Cyber-Duck is a digital transformation agency founded in 2005 and based in Elstree, United Kingdom. The company specialises in user experience (UX), software development and digital optimisation.

The company employs over 90 staff in the UK and Europe. It works with clients from the financial, pharmaceutical, sport, motoring and security sectors, among others. These include the Bank of England, Cancer Research UK, GOV.UK Verify partner CitizenSafe, The Commonwealth of Nations and Sport England.

== History ==
Cyber-Duck was founded in 2005 by Danny Bluestone in his flat in Mill Hill, United Kingdom. After a few months, the firm moved into its first office in Borehamwood.

Projects with Ogilvy, London Creative and Wisteria followed before Cyber-Duck moved to offices in Devonshire House, Borehamwood. In 2010, the firm was commissioned to develop a website for the European Commission in the UK.

In 2011, the company moved to a self-contained premises in Elstree, Hertfordshire. Shortly afterward, Cyber-Duck was listed on the Deloitte Technology Fast 500 EMEA in recognition of its substantial revenue growth over the previous five years.

As the company grew, its expertise also broadened. This resulted in guest spots on several television shows. Cyber-Duck was featured in an episode of the Gadget Show in 2011, and Chief Production Officer Matt Gibson appeared on BBC Watchdog in 2013 to assist in researching websites and their checkout processes.

The firm continued to attract business from companies in London, so the decision was made to open a new office in central London. The Farringdon office opened in 2015, and was followed by a rebrand.

In 2016, Cyber-Duck went on to work with the Bank of England. Ahead of the launch of the new polymer £5 note, featuring Winston Churchill, the company was tasked with creating a user-friendly website to showcase the new banknote and promote public awareness. The success of the campaign led to further commissions, including 2017's website the New Ten and a redesign of the Bank of England's main website.

The firm underwent significant growth in 2020, beginning working partnerships with Sport England and the College of Policing. During this time they also launched DevOps as a new service.

In 2022, the Farringdon office closed and was relocated to a new office space in Holborn. The Laravel, Drupal and DevOps teams expanded, and Cyber-Duck became the lead Digital Agency for Worcester, Bosch Group. Several members of the team appeared on The Digital Society on Sky UK.

== Awards and accreditations ==
Cyber-Duck is known for its focus on process accreditation as a driver of creativity. In 2011, the company obtained its first ISO 9241 accreditation in Human Centred Design for interactive systems.

Two years later, Cyber-Duck obtained a further certification, the ISO 9001 for Quality Management Systems. It acquired another certification in 2016 with the ISO 27001 – the focus of this accreditation was Information Security Management. In 2022, Cyber-Duck gained the ISO 14001 certification in Environmental Management.

Cyber-Duck's digital products have won numerous Wirehive 100, BIMA and Webby awards. Notably, the company's UX Companion, a free iOS and Android app that is a glossary of UX theories, featured in Usability Geek and Smashing Magazine. In 2021 they were awarded as one of the UK's 100 Best Small Companies to work for, and BIMA10 shortlisted for their work with Sport England and This Girl Can.
