= Jackie Lee (Irish singer) =

Irish popular music singer (born 1936)

- Also known as: Jacky; Emma Rede
- Born: Jacqueline Norah Flood; 29 May 1936 (age 90); Clontarf, Dublin, Ireland
- Genre: Pop
- Instrument: Vocals
- Years active: 1955–1973
- Labels: Decca, Oriole, Parlophone, Philips, Columbia (EMI), Pye
- Website: jackielee.org

Jackie Lee (born Jacqueline Norah Flood; 29 May 1936) is an Irish popular music singer, who has recorded under various stage names.

== Career ==
Lee was a musical child prodigy. She won a scholarship and trained as a soprano for four years. Upon finishing her studies she became a vocalist with the top showbands playing prestigious Irish venues.

Lee experienced similar success when she moved to London and joined the popular dance band The Squadronaires. In 1955 her first solo record was released, followed by a further two the next year. From 1959 to 1964, Lee was a member of The Raindrops, a successful quartet who made countless appearances on British TV and variety shows, had a BBC Radio show and released a string of records, the majority of which had Lee as lead vocalist. The Raindrops also included Les Vandyke and Vince Hill in its line-up. In 1962, she entered the UK heats of the Eurovision Song Contest as a solo act with "There's No-one in the Whole Wide World" and performed it at the British national finals for BBC TV. This number was later covered and performed by The Beatles in concerts during this period.

Lee decided to become a solo artist in 1965 and recorded 'beat' records until 1967. One of these releases, "Just Like a Man", reached the NME chart. The B-side; "I Gotta Be With You", became popular on the Northern soul circuit. Lee recorded this single under the name of 'Emma Rede' for EMI.

Lee also had a parallel career as a respected session singer, through her groups The Jackie Lee Singers and Tears of Joy. She provided the backing vocals for such global number ones as "Green Green Grass of Home" by Tom Jones and "Release Me" by Engelbert Humperdinck. Lee demonstrated her unique vocal range, ability and versatility on such diverse recordings as "Hey Joe" by Jimi Hendrix; and much of the James Last catalogue at the time. At one point, Elton John was employed by Lee, as a member of her session singers. In addition she also sang various songs for film soundtracks, among them "Born To Lose", from the film Robbery (1967), "Love Is Now", from the Norman J. Warren film Loving Feeling (1969), and the title song to the horror film Goodbye Gemini (1970).

In 1968, as 'Jacky', she had a UK Top Ten hit single with "The White Horses", the theme from a children's TV programme. Her definitive version was named the best TV theme tune of all time in The Penguin TV Companion (2001–2011). Her jazz-styled album of the same name was also released in 1968, which included contributions from Dudley Moore as pianist. By 1970, 'Jacky' reverted to 'Jackie Lee' and had another hit record, "Rupert" from the TV show based on the famous cartoon character, Rupert Bear. This recording also had a place in the "Best TV themes of all time" list from The Penguin TV Companion at Number 7, further consolidating Lee's latter-day reputation. A tie-in album, Jackie's Junior Choice, was released on Pye Records (PKL 5503) in 1971, followed by the similar Rupert and Other Junior Favourites on Pye's budget Golden Guinea label (GSGL 10492) in 1973, which also included her recording of another children's series theme, Inigo Pipkin.

It was shortly after this that she retired from singing, due to vocal complications and throat problems. Nonetheless, her singing continues to be held in high regard. It has been said that her work has "firmly embedded itself in the subconscious of a generation".

A CD entitled End of a Rainbow – A Pye Anthology was released in 2007. It comprising all of Lee's later recordings, made for Pye Records between 1969 and 1973. A second CD, The Town I Live In (2009), collects all of her 1966/1967 recordings for EMI. Lee is now retired and resides in Canada. Her husband, Liam Hopkins, died in 2018.

== Solo discography ==
=== Studio albums ===
- White Horses Philips BL7851 [mono] / SBL7851 [stereo] 1968
- Jackie's Junior Choice Pye Special PKL5503, September 1971 (revised reissue as Jackie Lee Sings Rupert Pye Golden Guinea GSGL10492, 1972.)

=== Compilation album ===
- End of a Rainbow: A Pye Anthology Poker Records/Cherry Red Records DECKCD107, 2007

=== Singles ===
- "I Was Wrong" (1955)
- "On the Outskirts of Paree" (1956)
- "Little Ship" (1956)
- "Party Lights" (1962)
- "The End of the World" (1963)
- "I Cry Alone" (1965)
- "Lonely Clown" (1965)
- "I Know Know Know I'll Never Love Love Love Someone Else" (1966)
- "The Town I Live In" (1966)
- "Just Like A Man" / "I Wanna Be With You" (as Emma Rede) (1967)
- "Born To Lose" (1967)
- "White Horses" (as Jacky) – UK No. 10 – 1968 – (Philips BF 1647)
- "We're Off And Running" (1968)
- "Love Is Now" (1969)
- "Love Is A Gamble" (1969)
- "Everybody Needs A Little Loving" (1970)
- "Rupert" – UK No. 14 – 1971 – (Pye 7N 450003)
- "One More Mountain" (1971)
- "Johnny Said Come Over" (1971)
- "Peter Pan" (1971)
- "Sleep" (1972)
- "Friends With You" (1972)
- "Inigo Pipkin" (1972)
- "You Make My Head Spin" (1973)
