= List of Armchair Theatre episodes =

Armchair Theatre is an anthology series of one-off plays that aired on the ITV network between 1956 and 1974. A total of 426 episodes were produced over 19 series. The series was initially produced by ABC Weekend TV until 1968, and subsequently by Thames Television from 1969 onwards. The programme also had several spin-off series including Armchair Mystery Theatre, Out of This World, Armchair Cinema and Armchair Thriller.

== Archival status ==
Due to the archival policies of television at the time, a total of 258 episodes are missing from the archives. Although the first series has no surviving episodes to date, the survival rate of episodes increases from Series 2 onwards. A total of 104 monochrome episodes survive as 16mm telerecordings, 18 episodes exist as 405-line 2-inch videotape conversions and a further episode "Exit Joe - Running" exists in incomplete form. From Series 15 onwards when the show started colour production, all episodes exist in the archives.

== Series overview ==
Series
Series	Episodes	Originally released	
Series	Episodes	First released	Last released
1	39	8 July 1956	8 September 1957
2	44	15 September 1957	3 August 1958
3	52	14 September 1958	6 September 1959
4	37	13 September 1959	29 May 1960
5	48	11 September 1960	31 December 1961
6	11	6 May 1962	30 September 1962
7	24	14 October 1962	15 September 1963
8	22	29 September 1963	28 June 1964
9	19	13 September 1964	25 April 1965
10	14	4 December 1965	30 April 1966
11	25	23 July 1966	15 April 1967
12	12	1 July 1967	16 September 1967
13	16	2 March 1968	27 July 1968
14	10	6 January 1969	10 March 1969
15	16	8 June 1970	17 November 1970
16	11	3 August 1971	19 October 1971
17	12	22 August 1972	11 December 1972
18	10	11 September 1973	13 November 1973
19	4	15 May 1974	9 July 1974

== ABC era (1956-1968) ==
=== Series 1 (1956-7) ===
The first series was produced by Dennis Vance, who had a preference for using classical material from plays and novels written by the likes of Dorothy Brandon, Guy de Maupassant, Edgar Allan Poe and Henry James respectively. The series was transmitted live from ABC's Manchester studios in Didsbury. Currently none of the episodes from this series are known to survive in the archives. The series was aired on Sundays, which would continue to be the standard until the end of Series 10 in 1966.

No. overall	No. in series	Title	Archival status	Archival medium	Original release date
1	1	"The Outsider"	Missing	N/A	8 July 1956
Adrienne Corri (Lalage), David Kossoff (Ragatzy), Raymond Huntley (Sturdee), Anthony Baird (Captain Wicherly), Olive Kirby (The Maid), Ian Fleming (Tollemache), Lloyd Lamble (Ladd), Carl Bernard (Helmore), Roy Hepworth (Sir Mathan Israel), Alicia Massy-Beresford (Receptionist), Annette Carell (Madame Klost), Richard Bebb (Basil).
2	2	"The Handshake/ Bid For Fame"	Missing	N/A	12 August 1956
"The Handshake": Rosalie Crutchley (Yvonne), Peter Coke (Robert), Conrad Phillips (David), Anton Diffring (Muller). "Bid For Fame": Robert Brown (Joe Mawson), Billie Whitelaw (Agnes Mawson), Hilda Barry (Mrs Turner).
3	3	"Tears in the Wind"	Missing	N/A	16 September 1956
Joan Greenwood (Claire), André Morell (Etienne), Barbara Mullen (Amélie), Ian Bannen (John), Sarah Lawson (Charlotte), Philip Ray (Doctor Paul Martin).
4	4	"Flash Point"	Missing	N/A	23 September 1956
Sam Wanamaker (Copeland), Andrew Cruickshank (Professor King), Jack Allen (Major Driscoll), Jessica Spencer (Denise King).
5	5	"Black Limelight"	Missing	N/A	30 September 1956
Rosalie Crutchley (Mary Charrington), John Robinson (Peter Charrington), John Welsh (Lawrence Manfred), Victor Brooks (Tanner), Betty Henderson (Jemima), David Williams (Coles), Charles Houston (Roberts), Hilary Paterson (Lily James).
6	6	"The Hollow Crown"	Missing	N/A	7 October 1956
Ronald Lewis (King Mark), Margaretta Scott (Queen Marya, the Queen Mother), Peter Illing (Count Janek), Anatole Smirnoff (Valenski), Leonard White (Captain Konanyi), Linda Gray (Countess Illona), Valerie Hanson (Queen Helga).
7	7	"It's an Ill Wind"	Missing	N/A	14 October 1956
James Hayter (Bert Taylor), Vi Stevens (Nellie Taylor), Billie Whitelaw (Gloria), Barbara Clegg (Rose Taylor), Edward Cast (Jim Taylor), Jeremy Burnham (Ronald Dukes), Stratford Johns (Simpson), Charles Stanley (Alan Rolfe), John Richmond (Doctor Jones), Donald Morley (Tom Hanrahan), Peter Vaughan (Third Journalist).
8	8	"The Mother"	Missing	N/A	28 October 1956
Katherine Kath (Mila Kosky), George Pravda (Paul Kosky), Bill Nagy (McLane), Gordon Tanner (Doctor Page), John Barrard (Gatekeeper), Malcolm Kerby (Peter), Marcia Manolescue (Anna), Christie Humphrey (Hilda), Brian Wilde (Ransom), Boris Ranevsky (Mr Danishev), Enid Lorimer (Mrs Danishev).
9	9	"The Common Man"	Missing	N/A	11 November 1956
Peter Butterworth (Albert Price), Hy Hazell (Miss Hardy), Monica Moore (Clare Price), Maureen Beck (Cecily), Frank Royde (Joshua Osbaldeston).
10	10	"The Right Thing"	Missing	N/A	25 November 1956
Patrick Barr (Bob Slater), Pauline Jameson (Ellen Slater), David Lander (Joe Walker), Charles Rolfe (Publican), David de Keyser (Police Officer), Natalie Moya (Woman Onlooker), Frances Guthrie (Cathy Slater), Nigel Anthony (Christopher Slater), Peter Dyneley (Philip Adams), Ann Firbank (Lois Collins), Gerald Anderson (James Harding), Oscar Quitak (Wilson), Jack Stewart (Walter Jaswyk), Eileen Way (Mary Jaswyk), Alaric Cotter (Steve Jaswyk), John Breslin (Mark Renna).
11	11	"The Face of a Stranger"	Missing	N/A	2 December 1956
Paul Carpenter (Beck), Kenneth Pauli (Danny), Gordon Sterne (Harry), Denis Shaw (Ziggy), Stan Thomason (Frank), Phil Vickers (Davis), Michael Corcoran (Joe).
12	12	"The Same Sky"	Missing	N/A	9 December 1956
Yvonne Mitchell (Esther Brodsky), Donald Houston (Jess Smith), David Kossoff (Poppa Brodsky), Thora Hird (Momma Brodsky), Alaric Cotter (Manny Brodsky), Joy Rodgers (Reeny Brodsky), Donald Morley (Sammy).
13	13	"Three O'Clock Deadline"	Missing	N/A	16 December 1956
Dorothy Alison (Stella Gilmore), William Devlin (George Gilmore), Michael Caridia (Billy Gilmore), Judy Horne (Jean Gilmore), Sam Kydd (Charles West), Jerome Willis (Security Clerk), Glynn Edwards (Harry), Grant Reddick (Fred), Charles Saynor (Pete), Gerald Cross (Shaun).
14	14	"Miss Julie"	Missing	N/A	23 December 1956
Mai Zetterling (Miss Julie), Tyrone Power (Jean), Maureen Pryor (Kristin).
15	15	"Ring Out the Old"	Missing	N/A	30 December 1956
Michael Gough (The Doctor), Jill Bennett (Isa), Maurice Kaufmann (Frank Hoffmann), Jane Arden (Bianca), John Gale (Lieutenant Stain), Vilma Anne Leslie (Ella).
16	16	"Michael and Mary"	Missing	N/A	13 January 1957
Robert Urquhart (Michael Rowe), Dorothy Alison (Mary Weston), Anne Loxley (Violette Cunliffe), Phyllis Morris (Mrs Tullivant), Llewellyn Rees (Reverend Simon Rowe), Kenneth Hyde (Harry Price), Arnold Bell (The Inspector), Robert Raglan (Doctor), Douglas Blackwell (Police Constable Cuff), David Aylmer (David Rowe), Cecily Hullett (Housekeeper), Barbara Clegg (Rosemary).
17	17	"The Necklace"	Missing	N/A	20 January 1957
Moira Lister (Mathilde Loisel), Lyndon Brook (Louis Loisel), Frances Rowe (Jeanne Forestier), Virginia Thomas (Marie), Marion Hughes (Jeanne's Maid), Roy Hepworth (Clerk), Carl Bernard (First Jeweller), Billy Milton (Second Jeweller), Sidney Vivian (Fishmonger).
18	18	"The Last Flight"	Missing	N/A	27 January 1957
Edana Romney (Marion Ashton), Geoffrey Keen (Edward Ashton), William Franklyn (Paul Lorrimer), John Warwick (Geoffrey Aldridge), Mercy Haystead (Janet Farley), Peter Rosser (Corcoran), Douglas Blackwell (Lloyd), Richard Butler (First Journalist), David Williams (Second Journalist), Peter Assinder (Control Tower Official), Stratford Johns (Air Traffic Controller), Bernard Horsfall (Interviewer).
19	19	"If This Be Treason?"	Missing	N/A	10 February 1957
Noel Willman (Major Jarvis), Thomas Duggan (Colonel Halpert), James Valentine (Captain Louis Stanhope), David Saire (Private Ridge), Robert Robinson (Sergeant Biggers), Ashley Harvey (Corporal Calvin Goodwin), John Devaut (First East German), Charles Ross (Shopkeeper), Jerry Stovin (Captain Jim Bradford), Renée Goddard (Ilse Hilfsmann), Harold Moore (Messenger), Gillian Vaughan (W.R.A.C.).
20	20	"The King of Iceland"	Missing	N/A	17 February 1957
Michael Shepley (The Colonel (Freddie)), Lloyd Pearson (The Brigadier (Alfie)), Richard Hurndall (His Highness), Jack Allen (The Major (Bertie)), Fred Goddard (Mulligan), Erik Chitty (Masters), Basil Dignam (Detective Inspector), Edward Cast (Sergeant), Edward Caddick (Man in a Raincoat), Stephen Laton (Police Constable Ericson).
21	21	"The Witness"	Missing	N/A	24 February 1957
Flora Robson (Miss Pringle), Michael Hordern (Detective Superintendent Coates), Nora Nicholson (Mrs Temple), Tom Criddle (The Intruder), Rose Hill (Mrs Finch), Wilfrid Brambell (Mr Finch), Nicholas Meredith (Detective Sergeant Jones), Duncan Lewis (Mr Carter), Arnold Bell (Detective Inspector Thompson).
22	22	"This Was a Woman"	Missing	N/A	10 March 1957
Sonia Dresdel (Olivia Russell), Lyndon Brook (Terry Russell), Alan White (Valentine Christy), Dorothy Bromiley (Fenella Russell), Henry Oscar (Arthur Russell), Beatrice Varley (Mrs Holmes), Lesley Nunnerley (Effie), Charles Cullum (Austen Penrose).
23	23	"The Cask of Amontillado"	Missing	N/A	17 March 1957
Adrienne Corri (Angela), Raymond Huntley (Carlo), Lorenza Colville (Violetta), Paul Stassino (Fortunato), Janet Barrow (Old Woman).
24	24	"Catch a Falling Star"	Missing	N/A	24 March 1957
Fay Compton (Julia Harrington), Harry Green (Samuel Webber), William Sylvester (George Hanley), Jessica Cairns (Miss Palumbo), Naomi Chance (Josephine Hanley), Rita Stevens (Maid).
25	25	"Hilda Morgan"	Missing	N/A	7 April 1957
Barbara Kelly (Hilda Morgan), Lionel Murton (Wally Turnbull), Larry Cross (David Temple), Patricia English (Ruth), Aletha Orr (Mrs Morgan), Ted Archer (Policeman), Estelle Brody (Mrs Temple), Robert Gallico, Grant Reddick.
26	26	"The Constant Stranger"	Missing	N/A	14 April 1957
Isabel Dean (Madeleine), George Baker (Pierre), Charles Lamb (Jean), Phyllis Montefiore (Honorine).
27	27	"Autumn"	Missing	N/A	21 April 1957
Flora Robson (Catherine Brooke), Ralph Michael (Mark Seeley), Wyndham Goldie (Sir Brian Brooke), Charmian Eyre (Monica Brooke), Nora Nicholson (Nannie), Sylvia Coleridge (Cousin May), Yvonne Coulette (Jane Gunning), Roy Malcolm (George), Nicholas Meredith (Arnold).
28	28	"The Heiress"	Missing	N/A	5 May 1957
Sarah Churchill (Catherine Sloper), André Morell (Doctor Sloper), Paul Daneman (Morris Townsend), Gillian Lind (Mrs Penniman), Dudy Nimmo (Maria), Priscilla Morgan (Marian).
29	29	"Rappaport Always Pays"	Missing	N/A	12 May 1957
Harry Green (Harry Rappaport), Renée Houston (Ethel Watts), Alfie Bass (Sam Schmaltz), Billie Whitelaw (Marlene Watts), Stanley van Beers (Jo Ruskin), Roland Greene (Jack Mason), Silvia Herklots (Rosie), Ivor Dean (A Man), Leslie Moorhouse (Fred).
30	30	"Possession"	Missing	N/A	19 May 1957
Sonia Dresdel (Eleanor Foxley), Derrick De Marney (Kenneth Wilding), Peter Rosser (Charles Foxley), Gene Anderson (Jean Elton), Beatrice Varley (Grace), David Williams (Policeman), Robert Cartland (William Benson), Christopher Hodge (Mayor), John Miller (Minister), Arnold Bell (Superintendent), Kenneth McClellan (Plain Clothes Man).
31	31	"Dear Murderer"	Missing	N/A	2 June 1957
Hugh Burden (Lee Warren), Adrienne Corri (Vivien Warren), Cyril Raymond (Inspector Penbury), John Bailey (Richard Fenton), Ronald Allen (Jimmy Martin), Betty Romaine (Rita).
32	32	"Escape to Happiness"	Missing	N/A	9 June 1957
Ronald Howard (Holger Brandt), Pauline Jameson (Marjit Brandt), Adelaide Vandermort (Anita Hoffman), Martin Miller (Thomas Stenbourg), Judy Horne (Ann Marie Brandt), Andrew Irvine (Eric Brandt), Alma Taylor (Greta Stenbourg), Katherine Page (Emma), Pearl Winkworth (Marianne).
33	33	"Start From Scratch"	Missing	N/A	16 June 1957
Peter Butterworth (Henry Cantrell), Avice Landone (Sybil Cantrell), William Mervyn (Doctor Scott), Margaret Halstan (Mrs Trout), Melvyn Hayes (Stephen Cantrell), Toke Townley (Percy Jarvis), Frances Guthrie (Nancy Cantrell), Allan Jeayes (Doctor Cosgriff), John Salew (Charles Denchy).
34	34	"It Pays to Advertise"	Missing	N/A	30 June 1957
Clive Morton (Sir Henry Martin), Catherine Boyle (Countess de Beaurien), Donald Hewlett (Rodney Martin), Jane Downs (Mary Grayson), Colin Croft (Ambrose Peake), Walter Horsbrugh (Johnson), Etain O'Dell (Miss Burke), Edwin Apps (Ellery Clark), John Boxer (George Bronson).
35	35	"The White Headed Boy"	Missing	N/A	14 July 1957
Liam Gaffney (George), Veronica Turleigh (Aunt Ellen), May Craig (Mrs Geoghan), Paul Farrell (John Duffy), Concepta Fennell (Delia), Pat Nolan (Dennis), Lynne Furlong (Jane), John Kelly (Henry), Harry Towb (Donough Brosnan).
36	36	"While Parents Sleep"	Missing	N/A	28 July 1957
Joan Haythorne (Mrs Hammond), Charles Heslop (Colonel Hammond), Noëlle Middleton (Lady Cattering), Wendy Craig (Bubbles Thompson), Edward Cast (Neville Hammond), Cicely Hullett (Nanny), June Brunell (Vintcent), Dinsdale Landen (Jerry Hammond).
37	37	"Bed, Board and Romance"	Missing	N/A	11 August 1957
Avril Angers (Hilda Greenhalgh), Terence Alexander (Ronnie Devenish), Mark Daly (Mr Bertenshaw), Alison Bayley (Mrs Greenhalgh), Douglas Ives (Mr Entwistle), Monica Moore (Mrs Entwistle), Anthony Kenway (Stanley Chadwick), Ursula Hanray (Lottie Clegg), Ivor Salter (Mr Foster), Gillian Maude (Mrs Foster), Julia Hand (Mrs Williams).
38	38	"The Woman Have Their Way"	Missing	N/A	25 August 1957
Henry Oscar (Don Julián), Patience Collier (Concha Puerto), Veronica Turleigh (Doña Belén), Paul Farrell (Don Cecilio), Ronald Allen (Adolfo), Anita Sharp Bolster (Santita), Lorenza Colville (Dieguilla), Lynne Cole (Angela), Dominica Cosby (Pilar), Michael Mellinger (Pepe Lora), Mary Peach (Juanita la Rosa).
39	39	"Off the Deep End"	Missing	N/A	8 September 1957
Peter Butterworth (Fred Dewsnap), John Westbrook (Maurice Aubert), Edward Cast (Edgar Jenkins), Alison Bayley (Lily Dewsnap), Margaret Anderson (Maureen Dewsnap), Michael Hitcham (Albert Hogarth), Gladys Boot (Mrs Ackworth).

=== Series 2 (1957-8) ===
Currently the earliest series with surviving episodes that are extant in the archives. This series was the first to be produced by Sydney Newman, who took over as Head of Drama at ABC midway during the series from Vance, who was promoted to a senior position in the company. Due to the live format of the series at the time, several episodes were pulled from transmission owing to technical failure or problems with the cast and crew. The broadcast of "The Shining Hour" was delayed by a week due to a faulty camera crane which could not be repaired in time, and the planned transmission of "Trial By Candlelight" was cancelled owing to the untimely illness of actress Freda Jackson, the production was subsequently remounted and tele-recorded for later transmission. The final episode that would have concluded the series "The House of Bernarda Alba" had to be pulled from transmission, after director Ted Kotcheff fell ill immediately prior to the live broadcast.

No. overall	No. in series	Title	Archival status	Archival medium	Original release date
40	1	"Now Let Him Go"	Exists	TR16	15 September 1957
Hugh Griffith (Simon Kendal), June Thorburn (Felicity), Ursula Howells (Nurse Judith), Fanny Rowe (Hermione), William Mervyn (Sir Edmund), Peter Halliday (Porter), John Schlesinger (Ticket Inspector), Beatrice Varley (Mrs Beeston), Philip Ray (Doctor Edge), Redmond Phillips (Mr Beeston), Gerald Lawson (Tommy Dupp), Noël Hood (Nurse Patton), John Breslin (Stan Beeston), John Curle (Birpool Reporter), Margaret Ashcroft (Penelope Bain), Robert Chetwyn (Kenneth), Allan Jeayes (Sir Jeffrey Brock), Frederick Schiller (Leo Margenstern), John Miller (Henry March), Raymond Rollett (Sir Marcus Connon), Dennis Franks (Second Porter), John Donegal (Railwayman), Bob Danvers-Walker (Radio Announcer).
41	2	"Ghosts"	Missing	N/A	22 September 1957
Ronald Lewis (Oswald Alving), Marie Ney (Mrs Alving), Basil Sydney (Pastor Manders), Mary Peach (Regina), Julian Somers (Engstrand).
42	3	"Policy for Love"	Missing	N/A	29 September 1957
Joan Greenwood (Antonia), Brian Reece (Miles Flood), Robert Urquhart (Anthony Coldstream), Colin Croft (Mark Hazelwood), Betty Baskcomb (Miss Merryweather), Kynaston Reeves (Septimus Hazelwood), Humphrey Morton (Hotel Manager), Vi Stevens (Landlady), George Street (Policeman).
43	4	"The Pier"	Missing	N/A	6 October 1957
George Rose (Fred Sanderson), Kenneth Griffith (Derry Spooner), Shaun O'Riordan (Tommy Ledou), Maureen Quinney (Trina Landau), Betty Henderson (Meg Sanderson), Derry Nesbitt (Otto), Alaric Cotter (Decco), Derek Briggs (Weazy), Michael Hastings (Dizzy), Tony Lyons (Reg), Peter O'Toole (Paddy), Penny Morrell (Sophie), Charles Saynor (Bill), Gillian Owen (Ba), Kika Markham (Scots Girl), Gerald Anderson (Inspector).
44	5	"An Inch from the Heart"	Missing	N/A	13 October 1957
Katherine Kath (Sister Denise Latour), Paul Stassino (Paul Recamier), Peter Illing (Superintendent of St Therese Hospital), John Arnatt (Superintendent of Westessex Hospital), Christine Finn (Sister Mary Stewart), Michael Danvers-Walker (Doctor Ferguson), Denis Holmes (Mr Cassells), Veronica Turleigh (Matron of Westessex Hospital), Barbara Shotter (Betty), Frank Shelley (Doctor Brown), Tony Spear (Herr Bruckner), Sybil Wise (Sister Bourget), Colette Bartropp (Sister Josette), Michael Ritterman (Doctor Wendel).
45	6	"Ann Veronica"	Missing	N/A	27 October 1957
Joan Greenwood (Ann Veronica), Robert Urquhart (Capes), Ambrosine Phillpotts (Lady Palsworthy), John Salew (Mr Ramage), Lloyd Pearson (Mr Stanley), Desmond Walter-Ellis (Hubert Manning), Joyce Wren (Maggie), Christine Silver (Miss Molly Stanley), Richard Burrell (Teddy Widgett), Margaret Dale (Honoria Widgett), Annabel Maule (Miss Klegg), Lionel Burns (Mr Widgett), Doris Speed (Mrs Widgett), Vi Stevens (Landlady), Jean Marlow (Miss Garvice), Joan Lovelace (Miss Clinger), Anne Wrigg (Kitty Brett).
46	7	"The Last Mile"	Missing	N/A	3 November 1957
Harry H. Corbett (John Mears (Cell 5)), Neil McCallum (Richard Walters (Cell 7)), Michael Mellinger (Eddie Warner (Cell 11)), Gilbert Winfield ('Red' Kirby (Cell 9)), Robert Robinson (Tom D'Amoro (Cell 1)), Don Gilliand (Fred Mayor (Cell 3)), Jimmy Riches (Vincent Jackson (Cell 13)), Tony Quinn (O'Flaherty), Edward Judd (Drake), Robert Ghisays (Peddie), Robert O'Neil (Harris), Dominic Roche (Frank Callaghan), Roddy McMillan (Father James O'Connors), James Douglas (Frost), Stratford Johns (Brooks).
47	8	"The Great Guy"	Missing	N/A	10 November 1957
Reginald Beckwith (Purvis), Maureen Pryor (Mrs Purvis), Diana Fairfax (Mrs Holm), Brian Parke (Young Lover), Heather Lloyd-Jones (Young Girl Lover), Charles Lamb (Walters), Tony Lyons (First Youth), Peter Assinder (Accordion Player), John Gabriel (Dave Critchley), George Merritt (Bob Gowling), Peter Bartlett (Volunteer), James Raglan (Post Warden), Christopher Sandford (Douglas Purvis), Frank Pendlebury (Man in Pyjamas), John Barry (Card Player), Daphne Oxenford (First Old Woman), Olive Kilner (Second Old Woman), Malcolm Knight (Second Youth), Diana Beaumont (Maureen), Desmond Jordan (Michael Holm), Alma Taylor (Mrs Castor), John Miller (Rigby).
48	9	"Man in a Moon"	Missing	N/A	17 November 1957
Donald Pleasence (Scientist), Hilton Edwards (Minister), Derek Oldham, Basil Dignam, Charles Houston, Jessica Spencer, Barbara Everest, Hilda Fenemore, Bob Danvers-Walker, James Raglan, Damaris Hayman, Job Stewart, Neil Wilson, Keith Anderson.
49	10	"The Human Touch"	Exists	TR16	24 November 1957
Robert Urquhart (Doctor James Y Simpson), Finlay Currie (Professor Syme), Pauline Jameson (Mrs Simpson), Mary Peach (Lady Janet Graham), John Cairney (Gilchrist), Russell Waters (Doctor Shearer), Jack Stewart (Sandy), Christine Pollon (The Woman Traerach), Ian Fleming (Doctor MacIntyre), Nigel Anthony (Davie), Leslie French (Doctor Mandel).
50	11	"Sister"	Missing	N/A	1 December 1957
Fay Compton (Angelica), Hugh Burden (Roger Alvanley), Harry Hutchinson (Gordon), Carmel McSharry (Pauline).
51	12	"The Mortimer Touch"	Missing	N/A	8 December 1957
Thorley Walters (Professor Mortimer), Billie Whitelaw (Connie May O'Leary), Katharine Page (Mrs Bonamy), Roddy McMillan (Shurie), Margo Cunningham (Miss Sobieski-Smith), Gretchen Franklin (Miss Julia), Angus Lennie (Alfred Shinney), Richard Butler (Tom Thistleton), Kynaston Reeves (The Duke of Applecross), Molly Urquhart (Mrs Shinney), Gerald Anderson (Major Kenmay), James Belchamber (Batman), John Crocker (Constable).
52	13	"The Dividing Line"	Missing	N/A	15 December 1957
John Robinson (Dennis Graham/ Varno), Maxine Audley (Martha Graham), Brian Wilde (Colonel Janek), William Fox (Aubrey Wilson), Gene Anderson (Diana Rylands), Arnold Bell (Colonel Crane), Gordon Sterne (George Moffat), Michael Ritterman (Rico), Charles Saynor (A Guard), Nigel Anthony (Bobby Graham).
53	14	"Panther 140"	Missing	N/A	22 December 1957
Harry H. Corbett (George Stedman), Joan Haythorne (Mary Stedman), Wallas Eaton (Willy Pilditch), Ernest Butcher (Grandad), David Graham (Derek Stedman), Jill Carson (Sally Pilditch), Yvonne Hills (Mabel Pilditch), Milo O'Shea (Seamus O'Connor), Norah Gordon (Mrs Phipps), Laurie Main (Harry), Jack Train (Major's Voice), Gerald Blake (Milkman).
54	15	"The Shining Hour"	Missing	N/A	5 January 1958
Elizabeth Sellars (Lise), Peter Wyngarde (David), Marian Spencer (Hannah), William Devlin (Henry), Diana Fairfax (Judy), Clifford Elkin (Micky).
55	16	"Man in the Corner"	Missing	N/A	12 January 1958
Bill Nagy (Joey Miller), Jacqueline Hill (Florence Miller), Maxwell Shaw (Luis Rodriquez), Gaylord Cavallaro (Nick), June Rodney (Ruby Antonelli), Robert Long (Bob), MacDonald Parke (Mr Cliff), Jimmy Rich (Peterson), Neil McCallum (Lefty), Natalie Lynn (Mother), Oliver Johnston (Pop), Patricia Cree (Sister).
56	17	"The Master Builder"	Missing	N/A	19 January 1958
André Morell (Halvard Solness), Marie Ney (Alvine Solness), Mary Peach (Hilda Wangel), Patrick Troughton (Ragnar Brovik), Christine Finn (Kaia Fosli), Oliver Burt (Doctor Herdal), Keith Pyott (Kurt Brovik).
57	18	"Tragedy in a Temporary Town"	Missing	N/A	26 January 1958
Eddie Byrne (Frank Doran), Peter Dyneley (Alec Beggs), George Margo (Pike), Barbara Lott (Grace Beggs), Stratford Johns (Sankey), Robert Robinson (Anderson), Roland Brand (Repulski), Marianne Benêt (Dotty Fisher), Mary Barclay (Mrs Fisher), Paul Curran (Matt Fisher), Alan Wilson (Harris), Richard Gatehouse (McCarthy), Sheldon Allan (Muller), Andreas Malandrinos (Julio Infante), Rose Alba (Dolores Infante), Tom Busby (Raphael Infante), Gillian Muir (Inez Infante), Neil McCallum (Buddy Beggs), Anne Padwick (Mrs Phillips), Job Stewart (John Phillips), Eric Hillyard (Harry N. Phillips), Donald Morley (Micky Doran).
58	19	"Night of the Ding-Dong"	Missing	N/A	2 February 1958
Hilton Edwards (Colonel Beauchamp), Athene Seyler (Mrs Beauchamp, Senior), Andrée Melly (Louise Beauchamp), David Courtney (Marcus Higson), Peter Myers (Thaddeus Beauchamp), Joyce Worsley (Victoria Beachamp), Margaret Clifford (Annette), John Kidd (Mr Morgan Nash), Ewen Solon (Mr Harry Kelp), Charles Morgan (Mr Godwin Shedly), John Vincent Laycock (Trumpeter).
59	20	"The Five Dollar Bill"	Missing	N/A	9 February 1958
Tim Seely (Ralph), Pamela Alan (Mrs Moore), Peter Dyneley ('Major' Moore), Jay Evans (Don), Sheila Gallagher (Virginia).
60	21	"The Lady of the Camellias"	Exists	TR16	16 February 1958
Ann Todd (Marguerite Gautier), David Knight (Armand Duval), Henry Oscar (Georges Duval), Douglas Wilmer (Arthur de Varville), Pamela Buckle (Nichette), Patience Collier (Prudence Duvernoy), Barbara Everest (Nanine), Violetta Farjeon (Olympe), Richard Gale (Gaston Rieux), George Howe (Saint-Gaudens), Ronald Allen (Gustave), John Bailey (Count de Giray), Harold Young (A Doctor).
61	22	"A Gust of Wind"	Missing	N/A	23 February 1958
Harry H. Corbett (Emanuel Rigattieri), Victor Rietti (President of the Tribunal), Ellen Pollock (Francesca Galassi), George A. Cooper (Vincenzo Galassi), Marianne Benêt (Angelina), Steve Plytas (Gianni Sorbi), Yvonne Warren (Teresina Bonfanti), Ewen Solon (Public Prosecutor), Stanley Segal (De Fabris), Bruno Barnabe (President of the Court of Appeal), Billy Milton (Clerk of the Court), Arnold Ridley (Sodini), Eric Hillyard (The Usher), Golda Casimir (The Maid), Gillian Gale (Gina Galassi), Martin Pierce (A Boy), Arthur Gomez (First Policeman), Leon Stock (Second Policeman), Olivia Irving (The Maid-Servant).
62	23	"Murder Story"	Missing	N/A	2 March 1958
James Hayter (Arthur Tanner), Olga Lindo (Elsie Tanner), Mervyn Johns (Prisoner Offer Graves), Neil McCallum (Jim Tanner), Richard Leech (Prison Chaplain), Gwenda Ewen (Daisy Richards), Tony Lyons (Ted Clift), Patricia Heneghan (Mrs Tomkins), Lloyd Lamble (Police Inspector), Antony Baird (Chief Officer Briggs), Jerold Wells (Prison Officer Bartholomew), James Raglan (Prison Governor).
63	24	"Vendetta"	Missing	N/A	9 March 1958
Leonard Sachs (President), Anthony Newlands (Enzo Fiorelli (Counsel for the Defence)), Andreas Malandrinos (Father Bonifacio), Harry Moore (Clerk of the Court), Jean Dickson (Anna Albertini), Denis Holmes (The Public Prosecutor), Bruno Barnabe (Captain Rienzi), Nancy Nevinson (Maria Belloni), Alex Scott (Giorgio Belloni), Alan Wilson (Luigi Albertini), Rose Alba (Gina Neri), Paul Curran (Ignazio Carrese).
64	25	"The One Who Came Back"	Missing	N/A	16 March 1958
Anton Diffring (Karl Brandt), Margaret Tyzack (Elizabeth Farrow), Ewen Solon (Bob Farrow), George Benson (Mr Prosser), Reginald Hearne (Sergeant Lawson), Michael Caridia (Roger Farrow), Edward Rees (Mr Stanford), George A. Cooper (Mr Collard), Glyn Houston (Mr Hollings), Patrick Carter (Corporal Wait), Richard Hayter (Major Blake), Bryan Kendrick (Private Skinner).
65	26	"A Man's Woman"	Missing	N/A	23 March 1958
Janette Scott (Maeve McHugh), Eddie Byrne (Peter Sheeran), John Cairney (Francis Sheeran), Larry Burns (Dan Dorian), May Craig (Mrs Sheeran), Peter MacKriel (Tim Sheeran), Jack Cunningham (Phelim Fitzfagan), Joan Phillips (Rosemaryanne Fitzfagan), Harry Hutchinson (Canon McCann).
66	27	"Emperor Jones"	Exists	TR16	30 March 1958
Kenneth Spencer (Brutus Jones), Harry H. Corbett (Smithers), Rashidi Onikoyi (Lem), Connie Smith (Old Woman), Astley Harvey (Cool Charlie), Stan Simmons (Prison Guard), Frank Blaine (Prison Guard), Van Boolen (Auctioneer), Latif Oki, Ayton Medas, Danny Daniels, Ron Blackman, Harry Quashie, Chief Odongo (The Boscoe Holder Dancers), Jimmy Moore (The Boscoe Holder Dancers), Cleo Dupont (The Boscoe Holder Dancers), Ken McGregor (The Boscoe Holder Dancers), Rudy Smellie (The Boscoe Holder Dancers).
67	28	"Miss Olive"	Missing	N/A	6 April 1958
Patricia Heneghan (Miss Olive), Gareth Jones (Oscar A. Pulley), Geoffrey Toone (Benjamin Stratton), Naomi Chance (Alice Meade), Ronan O'Casey (William R. Rush), Yvonne Warren (Peggy), Patricia Webster (Ethel), Sheila Gallagher (Dolores Cooper), Natalie Lynn (Mrs Todd), Vilma Anne Leslie (Bea), Mark Baker (Mr Herbert), Jay Evans (Bob Chase), Robert Ghisays (Stewart Young), Bill Edwards (Jerry).
68	29	"Wolf Pack"	Exists	TR16	13 April 1958
Ian Bannen (Commander John Tarlton), Richard Gale (Lieutenant Philip Seaton), David Davies (Commander Kirklees), William Fox (Rear-Admiral Saintsbury), Maurice Colbourne (Rear-Admiral Shapcott), Geoffrey Chater (Captain Mercombe, RN), Denys Graham (Egan), Ewan MacDuff (Donnithorne), Clive Baxter (McKerrow), Ken Warren (Chief Petty Officer Drage), Richard Carpenter (Fuller), David Ryder (Parham), Anthony Wager (Sub-Lieutenant Chatterton), Job Stewart (Lieutenant Anstey), Alexander Harris (Boydell), Bryan Kendrick (Smithson), Michael Danvers-Walker (Lieutenant Hoskins, RNVR), Philip Bond (Hubbard), Frederick Peisley (Boffin), Peter Lamsley (RAF Radar Operator), Leslie Smith (RAF Bomber Pilot), David Lyn (Stoke PO Jones), John Baskcomb (Chief ERA), Michael Ritterman (German Commander), Patrick Connor (German Lieutenant).
69	30	"The Rat Wife"	Missing	N/A	20 April 1958
Neil McCallum (Alfred Allmers), Mary Peach (Asta), Patricia Heneghan (Rita Allmers), Jimmy Ray (Eyolf), Joan Heath (An Old Woman), John Carson (Borghem).
70	31	"Fifty Fifty"	Missing	N/A	27 April 1958
Harry Green (John Bauer Senior), Frank Pettingell (Albert Biggleswade), Cameron Hall (Daniel Dawson), William Mervyn (John Craig), Ann Wakefield (Mary Biggleswade), Robert Robinson (John Bauer Jr).
71	32	"Breach of Marriage"	Exists	TR16	4 May 1958
Neil McCallum (Peter Stuart), Sarah Lawson (Ann Stuart), Roddy McMillan (Doctor Baring), Nan Munro (Mrs Mannering), Basil Dignam (Reverend Danial Hargreaves), Kevin Stoney (George Mannering, QC), Freda Bamford (Nurse Farrar), Shay Gorman (Doctor Gerald Farley).
72	33	"The Hanging Judge"	Missing	N/A	11 May 1958
Raymond Massey (Sir George Sidney, MP), John Robinson (Sir Francis Brittain), David Markham (Sir Keith Nottingham MC KC), Julian Somers (Ronald Pond), John Cairney (John Teal), Margaret Anderson (Mary Reddish), Gordon Gardner (Harry Gosling), Harry Hutchinson (Roberts), Beckett Bould (Hendry), Leslie French (Sie Alfred Parkinson), Reginald Smith (Mason), James Raglan (Colonel George Archer), Tom Macaulay (Miles Lambrey, KC), Deering Wells (Condon).
73	34	"Paid in Full"	Missing	N/A	18 May 1958
Paul Rogers (Doctor Alexander Logan), Eddie Byrne (Kenny Gibbs), Peter Illing (Sol Granofsky), Paul Carpenter (Frank Dooley), Paul Whitsun-Jones (Jerry), Pamela Alan (Kay Logan), Gene Anderson (Madge Gibbs), Kenneth Collins (Tommy Gibbs), Denis Gilmore (Steve Gibbs), Stanley Beard (Stan), June Powell (Dot), Robert Robinson (Tony), Robert Long (George), Frank Blaine (Cop), Peter Prouse (Willy), Gursten Rosenfeld (Photographer), Sylvia Childs (Ann Logan), James Dyrenforth (Jenkins), Janet S. Brandes (Middle-Aged Woman), Brenda Dunrich (Esther Bradbury), Spencer Teakle (Holt), Collette Wilde (Lorna Evans), Lorne Cossette (Herby), Peter Madden (Doctor Sam Layton), Jack Cunningham (Police Chief Horton), Robert Marsden (Prayer Leader), Sheldon Allan (Hawker), Mark Baker (Birch), Marian Diamond (Teenage Girl), Robert Ghisays (First Reporter), Colin Croft (Second Reporter), Audrey Rawlings (Hospital Nurse), Eugenie Snell (Doctor Logan's Nurse), Peggy Fane (Mrs Willis), Tom Watson (TV Man).
74	35	"Death of Satan"	Exists	TR16	25 May 1958
Alan Badel (Don Juan), John Laurie (Satan), Adrienne Corri (Marcia), Terence Alexander (Anthony Lissenden), Paul Whitsun-Jones (Oscar Wilde), Peter Rosser (A Bishop), Yolande Turner (Evelyn), Gordon Sterne (Lionel), Yvonne Warren (Bapista).
75	36	"The Widower"	Exists	TR16	1 June 1958
Kenneth Hyde (Paul Marly), Maggie Smith (Juliet Denise), John Cairney (Gilbert Dauriac), Douglas Blackwell (David), Janet Smith (Jacqueline), John Miller (Concierge).
76	37	"No Flags For Geebag"	Missing	N/A	8 June 1958
Donald Pleasence (Knocker), Jack MacGowran (Vince), Kenneth Warren (Fred), Lyle O'Hara (Julie), John Maxim (Sergeant), Lois McLean (Molly), Melvyn Hayes (Errol), Jerold Wells (Bill).
77	38	"Homecoming"	Missing	N/A	15 June 1958
Ann Todd (Marcia Preston), Hugh Williams (Charles Preston), Mona Washbourne (Lucy), Ann Beach (Jane Preston), Alan Penn (Fred Preston), Betty Romaine (Miss Rodney), William Kendall (Herbert Chalfont), Ann Castle (Enid Chalfont), James Raglan (Doctor Endicott).
78	39	"Trial By Candlelight"	Missing	N/A	22 June 1958
Michael Gwynn (Louis), Freda Jackson (Mrs Daphne Ridley), Ferdy Mayne (Guido Ponterosso), Janet Munro (Anne), Elma Soiron (Helene le Brasseur), Gareth Jones (Doctor George Merman), Susan Travers (Gigi), Nanette Newman (Maria), Olga Lowe (Sylvia Ponterosso), Peter Halliday (Mike Regan), Ben Williams (Seafaring Man), Oscar Quitak (Gailbrace), Marvin Kane (Pete), Chuck Keyser (Butch), Kenneth Pauli (Mac), Dermot Palmer (Joe), Vilma Anne Leslie (Floozie), Shayn Bahadur (Abdul), Elton Hayes (Guiratist).
79	40	"Wings of the Wind"	Missing	N/A	29 June 1958
Neil McCallum (Amedee Terrasson), Denis Shaw (The Prime Minister), Paul Whitsun-Jones (Rubuffel), Diana Daneman (Rose Rebuffel), Golda Casimir (Mme Honorine), Mollie Maureen (Mme Agnel), Joby Blanshard (Minister of the Interior), J. Leslie Frith (Marshal Tartelet), Michael Poole (Lieutenant), Patrick Carter (First Soldier), John Jackson (Second Soldier), Gerald C. Lawson (Prisoner Warder), Michael Logan (Minister of Justice), Reginald Jarman (The Prison Governor), Leonard Frank (Chef).
80	41	"Noon on Doomsday"	Missing	N/A	6 July 1958
Al Mulock (Lanier), Gareth Jones (Frank Grinstead), John Sullivan (Rodney Grinstead), George Margo (Charlie), Edward Judd (John Katell), Marpessa Dawn (Felicia Chinik), Peter Carver (Judge), Gordon Phillott (Old Man), Virginia Bedard, Robert Ghisays, Emma Young, Cal McCord.
81	42	"The Sins of Simone"	Missing	N/A	13 July 1958
James Hayter (Aristide Dindon), Richard Hurndall (Seipion), Joan Sterndale-Bennett (Mme Matthieu), George Woodbridge (Dominique), Constance Lorne (Elise (Comtesse de Tamarisque)), Edwin Apps (Horace (Comte de Tamarisque)), Ann Hughes (Julie), Neil Hallett (Richter), Joan Geary (Madame Domique), Rose Alba (Arabelle), Toke Townley (Melin), Frank Royde (General Guillaud), Raf De La Torre (Figasse), Clifford Elkin (Jean-Pierre Dindon), Graham Armitage (Garotte), Peter Stephens (The Bishop).
82	43	"The Woman in Question"	Missing	N/A	20 July 1958
Natasha Parry (Nieves), Anthony Newlands (Luis), Patricia Heneghan (Rosa), Henry Oscar (Father), Anita Sharp-Bolster (Maria), Peter Elliott (Inspector Ruiz), Richard Burrell (Jose), Joss Ambler (Watchman), Dudley Foster (Taxi Driver), Elizabeth Wallace (Juana), Nicholas Amer (Alberto).
83	44	"The Travelling Lady"	Exists	TR16	3 August 1958
Kim Stanley (Georgette Thomas), Denholm Elliott (Henry Thomas), Betty McDowall (Mrs Clara Breedlove), Ronan O'Casey (Slim Murray), Malcolm Keen (Judge Reilly), Pauline Knight (Margaret Rose), Sheldon Allan (Man Behind Counter), Kerrigan Prescott (Passer-By), Margaret Vines (Mrs Mavis), Laurie Garner (Sister Mavis), Bee Duffell (Mrs Tillman).
NB	NB	"The House of Bernarda Alba"	Cancelled	N/A	N/A
Beatrix Lehmann (Bernarda), Natasha Parry (Adela), Barbara Chilcott (Martirio), Valerie Taylor (La Poncia), Ellen Pollock (Isobella), Ann Stephenson (Maria Josefa), Margaret Gordon (Angustius), Mairhi Russell (Algna), Judith Harte (Amelia).

=== Series 3 (1958-9) ===
The first full series to be produced by Newman, who pushed for more original material, that led to commissioning teleplays from the likes of Malcolm Hulke, Tad Mosel, Mordecai Richler and John Glennon respectively. This in turn helped boost the series popularity, and by June 1959 when the current series ended, it was consistently in the top ten of audience ratings, with figures regularly exceeding 12 million viewers for 32 out of the 37 weeks the series was broadcast. As the programme was still broadcast live, production issues continued to occur; notably during the live broadcast of "Underground" on 30 November 1958, when actor Gareth Jones collapsed and died from a heart attack in between scenes. Newman instructed director Ted Kotcheff to continue the play and instruct the actors to improvise, as a way of avoiding the missing character from being noticed by the audience. This series also happens to have the highest number of episodes, with 52 editions broadcast between September 1958 - September 1959.

No. overall	No. in series	Title	Archival status	Archival medium	Original release date
84	1	"The Pillars of Midnight"	Missing	N/A	14 September 1958
Introduced by Charles Laughton; George Baker (Doctor Stephen Monks), Noel Willman (Doctor Clifford Preston), Simon Stephen (Julie Monks), George Howe (Father Maguire), Naomi Chance (Ruth Preston), Alexander Field (Prebble), Marjory Hawtrey (Matron), Michael Blakemore (Bradley), Leslie Sands (Buckeridge), Michael Logan (Deveen), Reggie Smith (Crombie), John Barrie (Gracey), Tom Macaulay (The Mayor), John Scott (Chief of Police), John Crocker (Orderly), Howard Goorney (Health Officer), Edward Dentith (Health Officer), Anthony Sheppard (Health Officer), Vi Stevens (Mrs Grey), Armine Sandford (Nurse), Ivor Dean (Hotel Proprietor), Carmen Hill (Womand), Charles Saynor (Man), Michael Craze (Boy), Brenda Saunders (Young Woman).
85	2	"The Web of Lace"	Missing	N/A	21 September 1958
Isabel Dean (Hélène Madinier), Jill Bennett (Agnes Madinier), Kenneth Griffith (Gervais Laroche), George Pravda (German Lieutenant), Colin Douglas (Bernard), David Lord (Michel), J. Leslie Frith (Elderly Man), Madeleine Christie (Elderly Woman), Fanny Carby (Julia).
86	3	"The Franchise Affair"	Missing	N/A	28 September 1958
Alec Clunes (Robert Blair), Martita Hunt (Mrs Julia Sharpe), Gwen Watford (Marion Sharpe), Paul Whitsun-Jones (Kevin MacDermott), Ann Tirard (Miss Tuff), Robert Cartland (Detective Inspector Grant), George Hagan (Inspector Hallam), Frances Guthrie (Betty Kane), Barbara Everest (Aunt Lin), Lennard Pearce (Bill Brough), Ruth Lodge (Mrs Wynn), Derrick Sherwin (Leslie), Kerry Jordan (Stan Peters), Denis Holmes (Miles Allison), Llewellyn Rees (Judge), Susan Westerby (Rose Glynn), Colin Croft (Bernard Chadwick), Joy Wood (Mrs Chadwick), Denis McCarthy (Foreman of the Jury).
87	4	"Murder in Slow Motion"	Missing	N/A	5 October 1958
Elizabeth Sellars (Jennifer Sibley), Eddie Byrne (Raymond Sibley), Richard Coleman (Patrick Sibley), Harry Landis (Press Photographer), Daniel Moynihan (Bill Beamish), Patrick Blackwell (O'Daly), Patrick Carter (First Mechanic), Phillip Stewart (Second Mechanic), André Charisse (Doctor).
88	5	"I Can Destroy the Sun"	Exists	TR16	12 October 1958
Maurice Denham (Doctor Lunn), John Robinson (Lloyd Crichton), Robert Ayres (Boardman), Leslie Sands (Superintendent Travers), John Barron (Henry Walpole), Jennifer Wright (Mary Harkness), Carmel McSharry (Bella), Robert James (James Cartwright), Paddy Webster (Helen Dawson), Jan Conrad (Igor Petrov).
89	6	"The Time of Your Life"	Missing	N/A	19 October 1958
Franchot Tone (Joe), Susan Strasberg (Kitty Duval), Myron McCormick (Nick), Ann Sheridan (Mary L.), Scott McKay (Dudley), Larry Blyden (Krupp), Rita Gam (Elsie), Arnold Moss (A Society Gentleman), Florence Mitchell (Ana), Howard Smith (Blick), George Matthews (McCarthy), Lonny Chapman (Tom), Dan Dailey (Harry), Art Ostrin (Newsboy), Will Kuluva (Arab), Billy M. Greene (Drunkard), Fred Karenan (Willie), Samuel Benskin (Wesley), Claire Armitage (Lorene), Len Doyle (Kit Carson), Rosanna San Marco (Nick's Ma), Charles K. Robinson III (Sailor), Betty Bartley (First Streetwalker), Hildy Parks (Second Streetwalker), Paula Lawrence (Society Lady), James Clifton (First Cop), Ely Baca (Second Cop).
90	7	"The Terrorist"	Exists	TR16	26 October 1958
Margaretta Scott (Miriam Morere), Sebastian Shaw (Georges Morere), Paul Stassino (Said Ali), Ann Beach (Janine), Wolfe Morris (Elhobki), Yolande Bavan (Aicha), Joseph Attard (Mahmoud), Barry Shawzin (Mezenna).
91	8	"The Witching Hour"	Missing	N/A	2 November 1958
Dennis Price (A. B. Murdock), Thora Hird (Miss Ogilvie), Frances Day (Helen Manning), Brian Oulton (Turner), Aithna Gover (Mrs O'Toole).
92	9	"The Greatest Man in the World"	Exists	TR16	9 November 1958
Patrick McGoohan (Jack 'Pal' Smurch), Donald Pleasence (President of the USA), Wensley Pithey (Frank Evans), John Sullivan (Peter Hunt), William Hutt (General Galway), Ludovic Kennedy (British Newscaster), Gerry Wilmot (Robert P. Darrow), Macdonald Parke (Kolbmeyer), Alex Ross (Charles Morgan), Janet S. Brandes (Emma Smurch), Peter Madden (School Principal), Mark Baker (Minister), Cal McCord (Police Official), Michael Balfour (Army Sergeant), Elaine Dundy (Drunken Girl), Arnold Bell (First Cabinet Minister), Launce Maraschal (Second Cabinet Minister), James Dyrenforth (Secretary of State), Guy Kingsley Poynter (First Reporter), Michael Preston (Second Reporter), Susan Crawford (Woman Reporter), Patricia Moffat (Nurse), Roland Brand (Bartender), Margaret Boyd (Old Lady), Alene Daniels (Schoolteacher), Spencer Teakle (Cameron Spottiswood).
93	10	"Please Murder Me"	Missing	N/A	16 November 1958
Eric Pohlmann (Mr Potz), Beryl Measor (Miss Higgins), Michael Ward (Mr Cobb), Ernst Ullman (Mr Yamouljian), Michael Moore (The Doctor).
94	11	"Boy with the Meat Axe"	Missing	N/A	23 November 1958
Richard Pasco (Johnnie Fellows), Sean Connery (Mike Smith), Virginia Maskell (Eve Smith), Sheila Allen (Sarah Fellowes), Vilma Anne Leslie (Mary Dean), Norman Pitt (Barman).
95	12	"Underground"	Missing	N/A	30 November 1958
Donald Houston (Art), Patricia Jessel (Cassie), Andrew Cruickshank (Mr Thornton), Gareth Jones (Carl Norman), Warren Mitchell (Stan), Ian Curry (Bob), Edward Dentith (Elliot), Peter Bowles (Simpson), Launce Maraschal (Old Man).
96	13	"The Report on Jessie Dean"	Missing	N/A	7 December 1958
Mervyn Johns (George Thompson), Robert Urquhart (Jim Dean), Patricia Heneghan (Jessie Dean), Ruth Dunning (Superintendent of Adoption Society), Annabel Maule (Sister Taylor), Ann Lynn (Joan Fielding), Valli Newby (Nurse), Hugh Cross (Doctor Savage), Edna Morris (Mrs Thompson), Diana Daneman (Elsie Thompson), Ronald Hines (Charles Hatley), Michael Hawkins (Police Inspector), Neil Wilson (Police Sergeant), Reginald Smith (Judge).
97	14	"Dangerous Word"	Missing	N/A	14 December 1958
Alec Clunes (Glyn Caradoc), Adrienne Corri (Peggy Banham), Robert Brown (Alan Singer), Rupert Davies (Eric Banham), Leo Britt (Major Jenkins), Ali Ganda (Oliver Cromwell), Ian Fleming (Doctor McGillivray), Alexander Doré (Club Member), Shaym Bahadur (Ali), Neville Crabbe (Constable Cromwell), Barie Johnson (Police Sergeant), George Davis (Club Servant), Rashidi Onikoyi (Agitator), Sally Home (Ursula Freeman), Pearl Prescod (Native Woman), Corrine Skinner (Dancing Girl).
98	15	"The Deaf Heart"	Missing	N/A	21 December 1958
Paul Rogers (Doctor Smith Huston), Janet Munro (Ruth Cornelius), Al Mulock (Doctor Franks), Madge Ryan (Mrs Cornelius), Graydon Gould (Joe Cornelius), Stratford Johns (Mr Cornelius), Janet Brandes (Mrs Dresher), Bruce Boa (Psychologist), Yvonne Shima (Fujiko Maki), James Dyrenforth (Doctor Blake), Rita Davies (Nurse), Lorne Cossette (Mental Patient), Jon Hansen (Student Psychiatrist).
99	16	"The Criminals"	Exists	TR16	28 December 1958
Stanley Baker (Luce Dorell), Raymond Huntley (Hector Crawford), Allan Cuthbertson (Vic Foley), Frederick Bartman (Geoffrey Saunders), Dermot Kelly (Fred Ellis), Peter Swanwick (John Stone), Fred Kitchen (Police Constable Harry Parker), Angus Lennie (Scotsman), Ronald Fraser (Scotsman).
100	17	"The Sentry"	Missing	N/A	4 January 1959
Lee Patterson (Meade), Harry H. Corbett (Owen), Percy Herbert (Sergeant), James Dyrenforth (Old Man), Michael Balfour (Ward), Tom Naylor (The Sentry), David Graham (Lieutenant), Peter Boretski (Private), Lorne Cossette (Ennis), Ryck Rydon (Blake).
101	18	"The Break"	Missing	N/A	11 January 1959
Phyllis Calvert (Esther Ross), Basil Sydney (Aylmer Ross), Ann Lynn (Stella Young), Sean Barrett (Clifford Ross), Annabel Maule (Probation Officer), Carmel McSharry (Mabel), Edward Jewesbury (Stuart Marshall).
102	19	"Soundings"	Missing	N/A	18 January 1959
Michael Gwynn (Doctor Mark Fowler), Archie Duncan (Shags), David Davies (Captain Scudder), Gerik Schjelderup (First Mate Larsen), Alexis Chesnakov (Carlson), Artro Morris (Dobbs), Steve Plytas (Halverson), Donald Morley (Meecham), Ruby Archer (First Woman), Susan Irvin (Second Woman), John Flexman (Stratton), Rex Robinson (Miller), Gregory Kane (Harrington).
103	20	"Love and Money"	Exists	TR16	25 January 1959
Richard Johnson (Walter Egmont), Sarah Lawson (Lavinia Crabtree), Marie Ney (Mrs Egmont), Ruth Taylor (Lady Everett), Albert Chevalier (Giles), Felicity Young (Janet Crabtree), John Miller (Doctor Selby), Eric Chitty (Mr Wilfrid).
104	21	"Hot Summer Night"	Exists	TR16	1 February 1959
John Slater (Jack Palmer (Jacko)), Ruth Dunning (Nell Palmer), Andrée Melly (Kathy Palmer), Harold Scott (The Old Man), Lloyd Reckord (Sonny Lincoln), Joyce Howard (Judy Gomez), Richard Walter (Frank Stephens).
105	22	"Ernie Barger is 50"	Missing	N/A	8 February 1959
Bernard Lee (Ernie Barger), Neil McCallum (Roy Barger), Alan Gifford (Abbot), Margaret Vines (Manelia Barger), James Dyrenforth (Mr Barger), Graydon Gould (Tom Bates), Mark Baker (Bartender), Gay Cameron (Louise).
106	23	"The Thug"	Missing	N/A	15 February 1959
Ian Hunter (John Owen), Alan Bates (Lewis Black), Sheila Allen (Charlotte Owen), Ian Hughes (Jackie Underdown), Stratford Johns (Nick), Roger Jones (Boy), Tom Gerard (Edward Starkie), Gillian Vaughan (Polly), Keith Faulkner (Mike Thompson), Annabel Maule (Florrie), Edward Dentith (Police Sergeant).
107	24	"To Ride a Tiger"	Missing	N/A	22 February 1959
Jessica Dunning (Marcia Ruiz), Gordon Chater (Gabriel Ruiz), Paul Stassino (Colonel Jose Montero), Alec Mango (Senor Lopez), Martin Sterndale (General Madero), Arnold Diamond (Senor Santoyo), Michael Peake (Senor Antos), Diana Fulker (Teresa), Sean Barrett (Juan Torres), Peter Elliott (Firomela Garcia), Donald Bisset (First Senator), John Miller (Second Senator), Peter Bowles (First Guard), John Murray-Scott (Second Guard).
108	25	"The Fabulous Money Maker"	Missing	N/A	1 March 1959
Ronald Lewis (Ivor Kreuger), Yolande Turner (Ingrid), Rupert Davies (J. P. Morgan Jr), Paul Whitsun-Jones (Donald Durant), Edward Woodward (Adolf Aberg), Helene Morris (Dancer), Launce Maraschal (First Director), Reginald Smith (Second Director), Michael Hawkins (First Journalist), Larry Cross (Second Journalist), Guy Kingsley Poynter (Accountant), Alexis Bobrinskey (Oscar Rydbeck).
109	26	"The Bird, the Bear and the Actress"	Exists	TR16	8 March 1959
Barry Jones (T.G.B.), Harry H. Corbett (P. Panghurst Shipers (The Bird)), Kate Reid (Gertrude Glass (The Actress)), Lee Montague (Harris Glass (The Bear)), John Sullivan (Edward Hastings), Paul Whitsun-Jones (Clarence Armstead), David Spenser (Abed), Jon Sullivan (Edward Hastings), John Serret (Monsieur Martin), Annabel Maule (Edwina Shippers), Rose Howlett (Old Woman).
110	27	"No Gun, No Guilt"	Missing	N/A	15 March 1959
Leo McKern (Sam Arlen), David Knight (Scott Arlen), Ann Lynn (Peggy Maylin), Alfred Burke (Ross B. Melnichor), Margaret Vines (Mrs Matson), James Dyrenforth (Vincent Borkman), Robert Perceval (Forest Gavin), Roger Winton (Mr Bean), John McLaren (Police Sergeant Brotby), Sally Travers (Miss Junkett), Launce Maraschal (Judge Stovell), Mark Baker (Hugh Patchen), Jack Lester (Dean Fuller).
111	28	"Strange Meeting"	Missing	N/A	22 March 1959
Wolfe Morris (The Stranger), Marla Landi (Grazia), Ferdy Mayne (Bruno), Tom Naylor (Robert), Stratford Johns (Police Inspector), Pauline Herbert (Lucia), Leon Stork (Raniero), Frank Sieman (Police Sergeant), Steve Plytas (Waiter), Larry Taylor (Antoine).
112	29	"Star in the Summer Night"	Missing	N/A	29 March 1959
Margaret Vines (Aledine Girard), H. G. Stoker (Martin McDonald), Sheila Allen (Nancy), Shane Rimmer (Paul), Jonathon Morris (The M.C.), Mark Baker (Peter, The Waiter), Harry Ross (Mr Angelo), Aubrey Morris (Mr Schwartz), Madge Ryan (Mrs Schwartz), Sheldon Allen (Mr Appleton), Janet Brandes (Mollie), Ryck Rydon (The Policeman).
113	30	"The Angry Flower"	Missing	N/A	5 April 1959
Gwen Watford (Mikoyo Tonoto), Maurice Denham (Professor Charles Elsworthy), Noëlle Middleton (Doctor Claire Foster), Ronan O'Casey (Max Watkins), Peter Elliott (Isamu Tonoto), Hugh Cross (Allison), Shaym Bahadur (Indian Student), Soraya Rafat (Receptionist), Eric Wong-Wah (Waiter).
114	31	"The Trouble with Benny"	Missing	N/A	12 April 1959
Richard Pasco (Benny Garber), Kate Reid (Bella Myerson), Sean Sullivan (Abe Garber), Ted Allan (Manny Krashinsky), Warren Mitchell (Myserson), Meier Tzelniker (Mr Debrofsky), Mark Baker (Sam Garber), Vic Wise (Moe Schneider), Mona Lilian (Mrs Schneider), Helen Misener (Mrs Garber), Florence Mann (Ruth), Garry Thorne.
115	32	"Parole"	Missing	N/A	19 April 1959
Rosalie Crutchley (Maggie Dunn), Ronald Hines (Timothy Dunn), Alfred Burke (Saunders), Philip Latham (Paul Roberts), Felicity Young (Cherry Watson), John Salew (Mr Prince), George Goldsmith (George Calder), Leslie Weston (Barman), Michael Balfour (Larry), Brian Weske (Val), Malcolm Knight (Gary), Tom Gerard (Rock), Tony Quinn (Police Inspector), Edward Dentith (Police Sergeant).
116	33	"The Shadow of the Ruthless"	Missing	N/A	26 April 1959
Anthony Quayle (Harry Albert), Harry H. Corbett (George Albert), David McCallum (Jim Albert), Delphi Lawrence (Glynis Albert), Allan Cuthbertson (Sholtoe), Kynaston Reeves (Lord Kildunn), Alan Keith (Sidney Clynie), Charles Gray (Lieutenant), John Barron (Porrit), John Warwick (Blinker), Martin Sterndale (Rubens), David de Keyser (Anderson), Victor Platt (Mayor).
117	34	"Hand in Glove"	Missing	N/A	3 May 1959
Jill Bennett (Lily), Peter Reynolds (Ramskill), Mona Washbourne (Auntie B), Rupert Davies (Detective Inspector), Leslie French (Mr Forsythe), Terence Knapp (Hughie), Olive Sloane (Mrs Willis), Jane Cunningham (Jenny), Anita Sharp-Bolster (Mrs Barton), Brian Weske (Paddy), Malcolm Knight (Bernie), Stratford Johns (Curly), Raymond Hodge (Detective Sergeant), Alan Rolfe (Constable), Leslie Sarony (Barman), Reginald Smith (Man in Bar).
118	35	"Till Death Do Us Part"	Missing	N/A	10 May 1959
Gwen Watford (Celia Benson), Ann Lynn (Maureen Donelly), Andrew Keir (Tom Benson), Delena Kidd (Sheila Kennedy), Gillian Webb (Mrs Anderson), Geoffrey Goldsmith (Jim Kennedy), Geoffrey Chater (Mr Anderson), John Barron (Doctor Edwards), Susan Westerby (Office Girl).
119	36	"The Big Client"	Missing	N/A	17 May 1959
Ian Bannen (Fred Curtis), Peter Dyneley (J. G. Henderson), Jack Hedley (Dave Mason), Jennifer Wright (Eleanor Comely), Maxwell Shaw (Sam Bloomberg), Charles Gray (Philip Comely), Angela Browne (Jennifer King), Leonard White (Geoff Manning), Barrie Cookson (Peter Jones), Olga Lowe (Greta Heffner).
120	37	"Girl on the Beach"	Missing	N/A	24 May 1959
William Russell (Smoky), Maggie Smith (The Girl), Esmond Knight (Uncle Karl), Madge Ryan (Ruth), Naomi Chance (Veronica), Ellen Pollock (Madame Renaud), André Charisse (Frenchman), Raymond Bennett (George), John Serret (Hotel Proprietor).
121	38	"Wedding Day"	Missing	N/A	31 May 1959
George Cole (Joe Western), Anton Diffring (Paul), Sally Bazely (Doris Shaw), Patricia Heneghan (Josie), Richard Gale (Bob Freeman), Victor Platt (Taxi Driver), Alec Bregonzi (First Bandsman), Charles Hill (Second Bandsman), Agatha Carroll (Mrs Shaw), Colin Croft (Peter Shaw), Michael Segal (Waiter), Derek Sydney (Head Waiter), Bernadette Milnes (Lily), Vi Stevens (Landlady), Leslie Sarony (Lodger), Emrys Leyshon (Mike), Peter Bathurst (Publican).
122	39	"My Guess Would Be Murder"	Missing	N/A	7 June 1959
Margaretta Scott (Laura Frost), Newton Blick (Doctor Stone), Jane Eccles (Alice Hunter), Patience Collier (Miss Woodmar), June Jago (Sister), Hugh Cross (Doctor Ogilvy), Noel Howlett (Mr Finnemore), Ronald Allen (Mr Burch), Johanna Martin (Nurse).
123	40	"The Devil's Instrument"	Missing	N/A	14 June 1959
Duncan Macrae (Peter (The Goose Boss)), Jonathan White (Jacob Schunk), Nigel Green (Darius), Claire Isbister (Marta), Hana Pravda (Marta's Mother), Andy Ho (Wong), Shane Rimmer (Joe), Brigid Panet (Anna), Endré Muller (Otta (The Oats and Barley Boss)), Jack Stewart (Preacher), David Saire (Vogel Unger), Michael Balfour (Jake).
124	41	"The Model Marriage"	Missing	N/A	21 June 1959
Mai Zetterling (Louise Josse), Paul Rogers (Charles Josse), Alec McCowen (Maurice Bouillet), Roland Curram (Pierre Gobert), Susan Westerby (Jeanette Cartier).
125	42	"Guest Appearance"	Missing	N/A	28 June 1959
Joyce Heron (Grace Shearing), Charles Gray (Stuart Marlowe), Paul Whitsun-Jones (Agent), Susannah York (Linda).
126	43	"My Lost Saints"	Missing	N/A	5 July 1959
Louise Allbritton (Mrs Hallett), Veronica Turleigh (Mama), June Jago (Kate), Alan Gifford (Mr Hallett), Sandra Stokes (Kitty Hallett).
127	44	"If You Loved Me"	Missing	N/A	12 July 1959
Helen Cherry (Stephanie), Michael Goodliffe (Eric Sargent), John Cairney (Francois Laurent), Dilys Laye (Jane Sargent), Barbara Everest (Mrs Pricne), Georgina Cookson (Monica Lake), Jane Grahame (Aunt Hester).
128	45	"The Grandma Bandit"	Missing	N/A	19 July 1959
Ronald Lewis (Henry Owen), Olga Lindo (Mrs Wheeler), Mary Peach (Mary Owen), Noel Howlett (Walter Orlcutt), Marion Hughes (Pamela Parry), Diana Daneman (Elsie Pratt), James Raglan (Jim Colson), Bernadette Milnes (Doris), Reginald Smith (Burton), James Land (Boy), Lionel Burns (Customer).
129	46	"A House of His Own"	Missing	N/A	26 July 1959
Donald Pleasence (Vincent Geil), Doris Nolan (Mrs Cavanaugh), John Arnatt (Doctor Lederer), Sean Sullivan (Crane), Alan Gifford (Brenner), Budd Knapp (Warden Spelli), Roland Brand (First Guard), John Flexman (Second Guiard), George Patterson (Governor Heritt), Lorne Cossette (Hall), Michael Balfour (Frank Yates), Robert Ghisays (Perrigo), David de Keyser (Chaplain), Robert Henderson (Thomas Wellman), Janet Brandes (Mrs Reynolds), Macdonald Parke (Edgar Wellman), Larry Cross (Major Ed Seton).
130	47	"The Garden Party"	Missing	N/A	2 August 1959
Gerry Jedd (India), Eddie Byrne (Frank), Patience Collier (Miss Mudd), Sandra Stokes (Beatrice), Graydon Gould (Casey).
131	48	"Lysette"	Missing	N/A	9 August 1959
Ronald Lewis, Ann Lynn, Wilfrid Brambell.
132	49	"You'll Never See Me Again"	Exists	35MM	16 August 1959
Ben Gazzara (Jim Mason), Leo Genn (Inspector Stillman), Brenda de Banzie (Mrs Alden), James Hayes (Joe Alden), Derek Aylward (Bob Roberts), Jacqueline Ellis (Myra), Ivor Salter (Sergeant Mitchell), Betty McDowall (Anne Roberts).
133	50	"Black Laughter/ Double Exit"	Missing	N/A	23 August 1959
Introduced by Henry Oscar; "Black Laughter": John Robinson (Charles Benson). "Double Exit": Michael Gough (George), Henry Oscar (James), Douglas Ives (Bond).
134	51	"Invitation to Murder"	Exists	35MM	30 August 1959
Robert Beatty (Michael Steel), Ernest Thesiger (Andrade), Lisa Daniely (Joan), Douglas Wilmer (Inspector Marquand), Catherine Feller (Leona), John Howlett (Sergeant Colbert), Bud Knapp (Boland), Denis Shaw (Karim), Guy Kingsley Poynter (Curtis), Keith Pyott (Doctor), Tony Thawnton (Waiter), Olga Dickie (Nurse Slagg).
135	52	"Young David"	Missing	N/A	6 September 1959
Introduced by Fredric March; Robert Morley (Mr Micawber), Alan Wheatley (Mr Murdstone), Patricia Jessel (Miss Murdstone), Martin Stephens (David), Irene Handl (Mrs Micawber), Barbara Ogilvie (Peggotty), Ann Gudrun (Mrs Copperfield), Fred Kitchen (Mr Quinion), Peter Bull (Mr Creakle), Marjorie Fleeson (Mrs Creakle), Michael Scoble (Mealy), Keith Smith (Captain Hopkins), Robert Raglan (First Creditor), Frank Pemberton (Second Creditor).

=== Series 4 (1959-60) ===
Production of the series moved Teddington Studios during the summer of 1959, which allowed production to be pre-recorded on videotape. With the emergence of the Angry Young Men movement at the time, Newman sought to capitalise on this and commission original plays from writers within the group, including Clive Exton, Harold Pinter and Alun Owen. The series shifted its focus to showing more realist material that focussed on the lives of the working classes, in contrast to the adaptions of high-brow classical material of earlier series. Two further episodes were pulled from transmission. "Three on a Gas Ring", a drama about a single mother who shows no remorse for her situation was banned by the ITA due to its subject matter, whilst "Two on a Tightrope" which was originally recorded in 1958, was scheduled for transmission on three different occasions, including the 22/6/1958, 3/1/1960 and 22/5/1960 before being dropped from the transmission schedule permanently.

No. overall	No. in series	Title	Archival status	Archival medium	Original release date
136	1	"The Scent of Fear"	Exists	TR16	13 September 1959
Dorothy Tutin (Joan Bridey), Anthony Quayle (Colonel Kralik), Neil McCallum (Karl Schling), John Carson (Tom Brook), Carl Duering (Sten), Wolfe Morris (Mueller), Frederick Schiller (Neumann), Alexis Chesnakov (Pechka), David Ritch (Brandt), Walter Gotell (First Policeman), Jan Conrad (Second Policeman), Barrie Cookson (Harry Mylner), Jack Stewart (Dusty Fraser), Jacqueline Ellis (Peggy Court), Andy Alston (Third Policeman), Lorenza Colville (Eva Kralik).
137	2	"After the Show"	Exists	TR16	20 September 1959
Hermione Baddeley (Mrs Liebig), Jeremy Spenser (Maurice Liebig), Ann Lynn (Sylvia), Paul Whitsun-Jones (Mr Morello), Carmel McSharry (Freda Cherrill), Hilda Barry (Mrs Morello), John Warwick (Doctor Worksop), Billy Milton (Davy), Joan Tyrrell (Joy), Diana Beaumont (Jennie Masters), Harry Walker (Jock), Robert James (Victor Leibig).
138	3	"Worm in the Bud"	Exists	TR16	27 September 1959
Barry Foster (Edgar Malone), Joseph Tomelty (Jimsey Barner), Elizabeth Begley (Mrs Bratney), Joseph O'Conor (District Inspector), Sally Home (Susan Robinson), Edward Malin (Mr Snow), James McLoughlin (Barman), Ann King (Ellie), Mary Duddy (Cleopatra McQuigg), Brian O'Higgins (Police Constable Henderson).
139	4	"Light from a Star"	Missing	N/A	4 October 1959
Isa Miranda (Karinskaya), Martin Miller (Alan Gorz), Barbara Couper (Lady Jane), William Fox (Jay Minton), Lionel Blair (Tommy Nelson), Roland Brand (Bob Kerouac), Peter Zander (Bernard), Natalie Lynn (Betsy), Henri Reynaud (Masseur), Ivor Salter (The Lover).
140	5	"The Thought of Tomorrow"	Exists	TR16	11 October 1959
Rupert Davies (Geoffrey Hanbury), Gillian Lind (Elspeth Hanbury), Frank Pettingell (Mr Burrage), Stanley van Beers (Maurice Hurry), Jennifer Daniel (Jane Bullett), Keith Banks (Mr Barlow), Valerie Gearon (Tricia), Dennis Chinnery (Keith Bradley), Brian Dent (The Doctor), Irene Richmond (A Barmaid).
141	6	"No Trams to Lime Street"	Missing	N/A	18 October 1959
Billie Whitelaw (Betty), Jack Hedley (Billy Mack), Alfred Lynch (Taff Owen), J. G. Devlin (Old Cassidy), Harry Hutchinson (Chief Engineer Owen), Tom Bell (Cassidy), Philip Morant (Police Sergeant), John Roden (Police Constable), Joyce Latham (Barmaid).
142	7	"A Trick of the Sun"	Missing	N/A	25 October 1959
Henry Oscar (Lionel), Lloyd Reckord (Edmund), Nan Munro (Lady Sedgmoor), Charles Lloyd-Pack (Pearson), John Forrest (Jeremy), Susannah York (Caroline), André Dakar (Uncle Ojo), Vilma Ann Leslie (Jeanette), Bari Johnson (Akoto).
143	8	"A Shilling for the Evil Day"	Missing	N/A	1 November 1959
Elizabeth Begley (Katherine Quinn), J. G. Devlin (John Quinn), Joseph O'Conor (Mr Thurston), Dermot Kelly (Tom Byers), Concepta Fennell (Molly Trainor), Maurice O'Callaghan (Michael Quinn), James Ellis (Stephen Quinn).
144	9	"Small Fish are Sweet"	Exists	TR16	8 November 1959
Donald Pleasence (Arthur Gladwell), Katherine Blake (Doris Binstead), Harold Scott (Smithy), Murray Melvin (Frank), John Ruddock (Mr Rogers), Felicity Ross (Marlene), Tom Macaulay (Smurthwaite), Margaret McGrath (Waitress), Carlos Douglas (Waiter).
145	10	"The Last of the Brave"	Exists	TR16	15 November 1959
Donald Wolfit (Colonel Louis Defoe), Paul Massie (Robert Defoe), Sheila Allen (Andrea), Keith Smith (First Policeman), Raymond Hodge (Second Policeman), Rosemary Scott (Mrs Defoe), Peter Elliott (Inspector Valency), Stanley Segal (Gerrard), Ivor Dean (Doctor Blanchard).
146	11	"Suspicious Mind"	Missing	N/A	22 November 1959
Gwen Watford (Louise Ridgeway), Colin Gordon (Mr Cooper), Mona Washbourne (Ellen Ridgeway), Ernest Thesiger (Professor Galton), Stratford Johns (Police Sergeant), Michael Corcoran (Postman), Charles Saynor (First Furniture Man), Gerald McAllister (Second Furniture Man), David Waller (Doctor Parker).
147	12	"The Rebel and the Soldier"	Missing	N/A	29 November 1959
Susannah York (Kathleen), J. G. Devlin (Professor Fogarty), Joseph O'Conor (Doctor Houlihan), John Carson (Aungus Macogue), Tim Seely (Seamus MacGonigal), Aithna Gover (Lily), Paul Farrell (Father Keogh), Eamonn Keane (Christy Hanafey), Harry Hutchinson (Jaimey MacGonigal).
148	13	"Dr Kabil"	Exists	TR16	6 December 1959
Peter Illing (Doctor Kabil), Pamela Alan (House Surgeon), Yolanda (Jacqueline Kabil), Leslie Sands (Romague), Rachidi Onikoyi (Rachidi), Judy Stanton (Toni), Carmen Munroe (Carmen), Martin Sterndale (Corrazzi), David Grey (Dolchuk), Gillian Hume (Sister), Bruno Barnabe (Doctor Gerard), Jo Crawford (First Nurse), Marion Hughes (Second Nurse), Brown Derby (Major Fouchet), John Scott (Granville), Nicholas Selby (Hillier), Ivor Salter (First Policeman), Andre Ducaine (Second Policeman), John Morris (Pathologist), Alan Browning (Anaesthetist).
149	14	"Roast Goose and Walnut Stuffing"	Missing	N/A	13 December 1959
Sandra Dorne (Elizabeth Lane), Alfred Lynch (Ben Jones), Phil Brown (John Sloan), Willoughby Goddard (Wardley), Aubrey Morris (Felix), Larry Cross (Dudley Beecham), Shane Rimmer (Campbell), Cal McCord (Sinkewicz), Libby Morris (Norah), Reginald Smith (Judge Crothers), Cynthia Kelly (Mrs Wright), Bill Edwards (First State Trooper), Lorne Cossette (Second State Trooper), Michael Ivan (Reporter).
150	15	"The Golden Horn"	Missing	N/A	20 December 1959
Margaretta Scott (The Marquesa de Santa Roca), Harry Lockart (Paquito), Lee Montague (Garcia Martinez), Wolfe Morris (Munoz), Valerie Gearon (Maria), Paul Curran (Manola Valdez), Shirley Jordan (Ruth Ohlsson), Michael Hitchman (Clerk), Colin Campbell (Bellboy), Victor Baring (Pepe), Steven Scott (First Sponsor), Kevin Brennan (Second Sponsor), George Pensotti (Adolfito), Brian Spink (Man), David Ritch (Miquel Esteban), Conchita Macaulay (Woman), Carlos Douglas (Carlos).
151	16	"The Last Tycoon"	Missing	N/A	27 December 1959
John Ireland (Monrow Stahr), Constance Cummings (Kathleen), Peter Dyneley (Lew Myrick), Sean Sullivan (Wylie White), Karel Stepanek (Pete Zavras), Paul Whitsun-Jones (Charles Kellog), Budd Knapp (Pat Brady), Betta St. John (Cecilia Brady), Olga Lowe (Birdy), William Peacock (Mark Gilligan), Bernard Archard (George Boxley), Vic Wise (Mike Van Dyke).
152	17	"Lord Arthur Saville's Crime"	Exists	VT405	3 January 1960
Terry-Thomas (Lord Arthur Savile), Robert Coote (Baines), Eric Pohlmann (Herr Winkelkopf), Ernest Thesiger (Dean of Paddington), June Thorburn (Sybil), Ambrosine Phillpotts (Lady Julia), Arthur Lowe (Mr Podgers), Nora Nicholson (Aunt Clementina), Kynaston Reeves (Uncle Jasper), Michael Hitchman (Mr Pestle).
153	18	"Where I Live"	Exists	TR16	10 January 1960
Ruth Dunning (Jessy Turner), Robert Brown (Bert Turner), Lloyd Lamble (George Dove), Madge Ryan (Vi Dove), Paul Curran (Dad).
154	19	"Misfire"	Missing	N/A	17 January 1960
Adrienne Corri (Helen Renfrew), Robert Shaw (Mark Renfrew), John Bentley (Stephen Craig), Colin Douglas (Police Sergeant), Anthony Woodruff (Clergyman), Mary Wimbush (Miss Pembroke).
155	20	"Fifth Floor People"	Missing	N/A	24 January 1960
Ronald Lewis (Jeremy Johnson), Billie Whitelaw (Ann Johnson), Paul Daneman (Doctor Patterson), Elizabeth Begley (Mrs Frazer), J. G. Devlin (Mr Frazer), Judi Bloom (Alice), Peter Kelly (Boy Friend), Allan Trevor (Peter Allenbury), Alexander Field (Mr Hartley Senior), Alexander Archdale (Mr Hartley Junior), Mary Williams (Mrs Hartley).
156	21	"Cold Fury"	Missing	N/A	31 January 1960
Sam Wanamaker (Matty), Bernard Lee (Aaronson), Lyndon Brook (Donkin).
157	22	"Night Panic"	Missing	N/A	7 February 1960
Zena Walker (Joan Lindsay), Ann Beach (Elaine Morris), Frederick Jaeger (Bick), Russell Waters (Detective Inspector), Warren Mitchell (Landlord), Donald Morley (Tucker), Ray Barrett (Ben), John Sharplin (Mr Underhill), Bruce Wightman (Police Constable), Edward Dentith (Detective Sergeant).
158	23	"Come in Razor Red"	Missing	N/A	14 February 1960
Richard Harris (Major Gaylord), Sean Sullivan (Franks), Cec Linder (Sloane), John Barrie (Chick), John McLaren (Chaplain Walker), Graydon Gould (Jones), Bernard Hayes (First Radio Operator), Guy Kingsley Poynter (Peters), Shane Rimmer (First Generator Operator), Barry Lowe (Second Radio Operator), Christopher Taylor (Richard Golden), Brad Dancy (Soldier), John Ebdon (Chaxfield), Jerry Greben (Second Generator Operator), Malcolm MacDonald (Wounded Soldier), Laurence Harrington (Corporal).
159	24	"Guardian Angel"	Missing	N/A	21 February 1960
Keith Michell (Paul de Lussac), Maggie Smith (Anna Carnot), Rupert Davies (Ramon Cintos), Fenella Fielding (Susi Flamberg), Vivienne Drummond (Sylvia Cintos), Maxwell Shaw (Martin Vernet), Richard Molinas (Gustav Flamberg), Denis Holmes (Henri).
160	25	"Pink String and Sealing Wax"	Missing	N/A	28 February 1960
Elizabeth Sellars (Pearl Bond), Edward Chapman (Edward Strachan), Tim Seely (Albert Strachan), Judi Dench (Emily Strachan), Veronica Turleigh (Myra Strachan), Carol Wolveridge (Jessie Strachan), Philip Lennard (Doctor O'Shea), Robert Checksfield (Ernest O'Shea), Alison Frazer (Eva Strachan), Richard Klee (Delivery Man), Penny Newington (Lucy), Maidie Andrews (Customer).
161	26	"China Doll"	Missing	N/A	6 March 1960
Ursula Howells (Violet Green), Hugh Burden (Lionel Green), Tom Gerard (Bob Atherton), Reg Lever (Ainsworth), Will Leighton (Jack).
162	27	"Some Talk of Alexander"	Exists	TR16	13 March 1960
Harry Andrews (Blanco White), Ingeborg Wells (Anna Klein), James Culliford (Albert Klein), Barbara Hicks (Mrs Bone), Douglas Blackwell (Sergeant Briggs), Henry Davies (Barman), Brian Weske (Tony), Robin Gammell (Wal), Pete Walker (Jerry).
163	28	"The Girl in the Market Square"	Missing	N/A	20 March 1960
Leo McKern (Charles Warren), Andrew Ray (Lyndon Warren), Rupert Davies (Inspector Shawcross), Wensley Pithey (Doctor Fenwick), Anthony Newlands (G.D.H. 'Jedda' Buckley), Michael Collins (Police Constable Robinson), Edward Evans (Gerry Dove), Frank Atkinson (Harvey Longthwaite), Vanda Godsell (Grace Warren), Susan Denny (Ruth Warren), Hilary Mason (Daisy Bragg).
164	29	"Roman Gesture"	Missing	N/A	27 March 1960
Arthur Hill (Mike Willow), Clifford Evans (Italo Cappa), Alexander Gauge (Paul Vechler), Katherine Blake (Carla Melini), Margaret Griffin (Stewardess), Errol MacKinnon (Willy Muldoon), Maurice Durant (Allenby), Cynthia Kelly (Maid), Mark Baker (Al Pickwick), Arthur Gomez (Italian Official), Andrikos Adonis (Luigi), Andreas Malandrinos (Waiter).
165	30	"After the Funeral"	Exists	VT405	3 April 1960
William Lucas (Dave Roberts), Hugh David (Morgan Roberts), Charles Carson (Captain John Roberts), Sylvia Kay (Vera Bryant), Margaret John (Ailwen Roberts), Rachel Thomas (Aunty Blodwen), Dorothea Phillips (Esther).
166	31	"The Leather Jungle"	Missing	N/A	10 April 1960
Neil McCallum (Dave Burke), Sean Lynch (Stan Evans), Dudley Sutton (Willie Watson), Edward Judd (Steve Owen), Fiona Duncan (Mary Burke), Fred Piper (Mr Burke), Sidney Vivian (Mr Beckles), Christopher Cook (First Boy), Peter Delmar (Second Boy), Peter Chenault (Third Boy), Rita Webb (First Woman), Hilda Barry (Second Woman), Fred Griffiths (Bill Spencer), David Webb (Wal), Tom Gerard (Joe Cully), Mark Heath (Ned), Horri Taylor (Sparring Partner), Allan Trevor (Jim Western), Thomas Gallagher (Alf), Eric Boon (Boxer), Danny Sewell (Boxer), Anthony Flood (Boxer), Arthur Lovegrove (Charlie), Hugh Futcher (Tony Fury), Freddie Mills (Referee).
167	32	"Hold My Hand, Soldier"	Missing	N/A	17 April 1960
Gordon Jackson (The Officer), Victor Maddern (The Private), Ronald Fraser (The Corporal).
168	33	"A Night Out"	Exists	TR16	24 April 1960
Madge Ryan (Mrs Stokes), Tom Bell (Albert Stokes), Vivien Merchant (The Girl), Arthur Lowe (Mr King), Harold Pinter (Seeley), Philip Locke (Ledge), Edmond Bennett (Barman at Coffee Stall), Gordon Phillott (Old Man), José Read (Joyce), Maria Lennard (Eileen), Edward Malin (Mr Ryan), Stanley Meadows (Gidney), Mary Duddy (Betty), Stanley Segal (Horne), Walter Hall (Barrow).
169	34	"A Phone Call for Matthew Quade"	Missing	N/A	1 May 1960
Ed Begley (Matthew Quade), Richard Pasco (Archie Summers), Betty McDowall (Polly Benedict), Avice Landon (Mary Quade), James Dyrenforth (Ed Prince), John McLaren (Grieves), Paul Maxwell (Walt Benedict), Dennis Waterman (Ralph Benedict).
170	35	"The Innocent"	Missing	N/A	8 May 1960
Diana Dors (Jane Francis), Ian Hunter (Sir Malcolm Saville), Kynaston Reeves (Judge), Basil Dignam (Mr Bradshaw), Yvonne Romain (Tina Fiori), Patrick Macnee (David Manning), Nicholas Selby (Charles Seale), Paul Williamson (Ben), Deborah Buchan (Susan), Cicely Hullett (Miss Emery), Robert Raglan (Detective Superintendent), Denis Holmes (Detective Sergeant), Geoffrey Denys (Clerk of the Court).
171	36	"Nest of Four"	Missing	N/A	15 May 1960
Bernard Lee (Tom), Alfred Lynch (Freddy), Harold Goldblatt (Barney), Bernard Goldman (Mo Morris), Leslie Sands (Police Inspector), David Brierley (Police Constable).
172	37	"On the Spot"	Missing	N/A	29 May 1960
Ted Allan (Tony Perelli), David McCallum (Jimmy McGrath), Duncan Lamont (Con O'Hara), Alfred Burke (John Kelly), Al Mulock (Angelo Verona), Kenneth J. Warren (Mike Feeney), Yvonne Romain (Maria Pouliska), Julie Allen (Minn Lee).
NB	NB	"Three on a Gas Ring"	Missing	N/A	N/A
Joanna Dunham, Alan Bates, Sheila Allen.
NB	NB	"Two on a Tightrope"	Exists	TR16	N/A
Jack Hedley, Margaret Whiting.

=== Series 5 (1960-1) ===
This series had the longest run of any season, running for 15 months in total, although some episodes later on in the run were broadcast in fortnightly intervals, as opposed to its traditional weekly format. One of the notable plays of the series was "Lena, O My Lena" by Alun Owen, which concluded the trilogy of plays about working class life in Northern England that he began in the previous series, "No Trains to Lime Street" and "After the Funeral". The three plays were critically acclaimed, and subsequently Owen won the Directors Merit Award.

No. overall	No. in series	Title	Archival status	Archival medium	Original release date
173	1	"Big Brain Man"	Missing	N/A	11 September 1960
Johnny Sekka (Sammy Oliver), Stanley Meadows (Mr Johnson), Donald Morley (Mr King), Leo Carreras (Martin Fisher), Nadia Cattouse (Barbara Fisher), Rodney Douglas (West Indian Applicant), Dolores Mantez (Gloria Oliver), Pearl Prescod (Esther Poole), Tessa Hume (Nurse), Dorothy Edwards (Sister).
174	2	"A Heart and a Diamond"	Missing	N/A	18 September 1960
John Justin (Harry Coniston), Joseph Furst (Ex-King Gustavus III), Giorgia Moll (Nikki), Steve Plytas (Paul), Gillian Eddison (Manicurist), Victor Baring (First Policeman), Bruno Barnabe (Judge), Carlos Douglas (Second Policeman), Lee Crawford (Page Boy), John Dearth (Enrico), Raymond Rollett (Boni), Bert Simms (Gaetano), Roger Delgado (Antonio).
175	3	"Lena, O My Lena"	Exists	VT405	25 September 1960
Billie Whitelaw (Lena), Peter McEnery (Tom), Scott Forbes (Glyn), Colin Blakely (Ted), Paddy O'Connell (Derek), Keith Smith (Charlie), Jeanne Hepple (Peggy), Kathleen Heath (Middle-Aged Woman), Edna Doré (Older Woman), Betty Romaine (Forewoman), Margery Withers (Derek's Mother), Carlos Douglas (Jean-Louis).
176	4	"Pig's Ear with Flowers"	Missing	N/A	2 October 1960
Isa Miranda (Maria), Harry H. Corbett (Fred Harris), Madge Ryan (Mrs Maurice), Basil Lord (Valentine), Margaret Courtenay, Michael Hawkins (Immigration Officer), Richard Klee (Assistant Purser), Ronald Lacey (Valentine), Michael Tennant (Anthony Maurice), Hilda Barry (Mrs Biggs), Eleanor Darling (Old Woman), Colin Fry (Man), Leslie Sarony (Landlord), Eddy Samuels (Pianist).
177	5	"Thunder on the Snowy"	Missing	N/A	9 October 1960
Harry H. Corbett (Jan Radeck), Jill Bennett (Stella), Betty McDowall (Kathy), Paul Stassino (Nick Zafiris), Gordon Boyd (Dave Murray), Alister Williamson (Bluey), Blaise Wyndham (Paddy), Jerold Wells (Frank Dane), Ray Barrett (Donnie), Harry Walker (Jock Clifford).
178	6	"Siege at Killyfaddy"	Missing	N/A	16 October 1960
Gary Cockrell (Curtis Carter), Perlita Neilson (Eileen Drage), Marie Ney (Aunt Deirdre), Michael Crawford (Dermot Drage), P. G. Stephens (The Smiler), Robert Mooney (Sean McIlhanna), Tony Quinn (Gabriel O'Sullivan-Byrne), Dermot MacDowell (Sergeant Rooney), Harry Hutchinson (Sam Hanna), Colin Blakely (Sergeant Dickie), John O'Byrne (Declan), Denys Hawthorne (Alan Drage), Michael Shepley (Colonel Drage).
179	7	"I'll Have You To Remember"	Exists	TR16	23 October 1960
Stephen Murray (George James), Ruth Dunning (Milly James).
180	8	"My Representative"	Exists	TR16	30 October 1960
Paul Massie (Ronnie Page), Helen Cherry (Lady Gillian Hunt), Sylvia Kay (Sheila Clark), Glyn Owen (Jack Jones), Laurence Hardy (Herbert Pratt), Michael Ward (Dominic Boyd), Arthur Hewlett (Henry Ambrose), Ken Parry (Mr Spink), Michael Hitchman (Man in Pub), Henry McGee (Cricket Enthusiast), Elizabeth London (Fashion Commere).
181	9	"The Cake Baker"	Missing	N/A	6 November 1960
Kim Stanley (Millie Norman), William Sylvester (Ed Norman), Madge Ryan (Eleanor), Pauline Foreman (Jenny Norman), Stella Bonheur (Mrs Myerson), Madeleine Burgess (Dolly Pennington), Bay White (Mrs Taylor), Diana Hope (Programme Chairman), Alec Ross (Warehouseman), Court Benson (Mr Grogan), Janet Brandes (Mrs Holman), Anne Carr (Mrs Lawrence).
182	10	"Hail the Conquering Hero"	Missing	N/A	13 November 1960
Ronald Fraser (Jock Sinclair), Patsy Rowlands (Peggy Landis), Dudley Foster (Sergeant-Major Williams), Graham Crowden (Major Winters), Richard Caldicot (Brigadier Landis), Brian Hulme (Tommy Burke), Dudley Sutton (Charlie Glass), Barry Wilsher (Harry Brown), Kim Tracy (Susan Winters), Ray Mort (Corporal Tomkins).
183	11	"The Stranger"	Missing	N/A	20 November 1960
Peter Sallis (Mr Milroy), Violet Farebrother (Ruby), Madge Ryan (Muriel Blacker), Lloyd Lamble (Charlie Blacker), Beatrice Varley (Ada), Toke Townley (Photographer), Renny Lister (Jill), Ronald Lacey (Len), Ruth Kettlewell (Annie), Eleanor Darling (Mrs Clayton), Arthur Lowe (Mr Possiter), Beatrice Kane (Mrs Possiter), Mark Eden (Albert Merkins), Etain O'Dell (Violet Merkins), Dorothea Phillips (Female Cousin), Ivor Salter (Jim), Anthony Cundell (Leslie), Alison Fraser (Beryl), John Bosch (Cliff), Philip Ray (Doctor Kent).
184	12	"Mister Nobody"	Missing	N/A	27 November 1960
George Benson (Arthur Hopkins), Clifford Evans (Captain Brevitt), Joyce Heron (Mavis Hopkins), John Salew (Edgar Burrows), Richard Caldicot (George), Frazer Hines (Perce), Henry Manning (Librarian), Sheila Reid (Assistant Librarian), Joy Wood (Renee), Bernadette Milnes (Girl), William Marlowe (Marine), Hilda Fenemore (Lilian Burro
185	13	"Clip Joint People"	Missing	N/A	4 December 1960
Peter Sallis (Sam Carter), Lois Daine (Tess), Joan Newell (Lily), Maurice Good (Colin), Gerald James (Man), Joyce Hemson (Lanky), Barbara Young (Sheila), Claire Marshall (Maureen), Ingrid Hafner (Iris), Nilo Christian (Eve), Reg Lever (Granny), Shandra Walden (Joy), Nicholas Evans (Boy), Max Miradin (Timid Man), Frederick Schiller (Bald Man), Michael Robbins (Soldier), Richard Cuthbert (First Man), Kenneth Mosley (Second Man).
186	14	"The Cupboard"	Exists	TR16	11 December 1960
Donald Pleasence (Fred Watson), Elizabeth Begley (Mrs Sparrow), David Davies (Detective Sergeant Roberts), Philip Locke (Bert), Michael Ivan (Alf), Alfred Maron (Change Man), Joan Tyrrell (Mrs Williams), Michael Golden (Mr Jones), Dudley Sutton (Police Constable), John Ebdon (Mr Williams), Victor Platt (Mr Billings).
187	15	"Rain"	Missing	N/A	18 December 1960
Diane Cilento (Sadie Thompson), John Drainie (The Reverend Davidson), William Sylvester (Sergeant O'Hara), Joan Haythorne (Mrs Davidson), Paul Curran (Doctor MacPhail), Jenny Laird (Mrs MacPhail), Golda Casimir (Mrs Horn), Christopher Carlos (Joe Horn), Arnold Yarrow (Bates), Johnny Arlan (Native Boy), Peter Needham (Griggs), David Airey (Hodgson).
188	16	"The Great Gold Bullion Robbery"	Missing	N/A	25 December 1960
Donald Wolfit (James Saward), James Booth (Edward Agar), Douglas Wilmer (Sir Ernest Calvin), Colin Blakely (William Pierce), John Miller (Stationmaster), Leslie Weston (James Burgess), Henry Longhurst (Archibald Henry), Judith Whitaker (Fanny Agar), Henry McGee (George Tester), Margaret Gibson (Governess), Fiona Fairrie (Priscilla), Anthony Bate (Albert Adams), Walter Hall (Porter), John Boxer (Hubbard), Jeremy Young (Massingham), Frank Peters (Prison Warder), Joyce Hemson (Prisoner's Wife), Graham Stuart (Justice Martin), Malcolm Watson (Court Usher), Peter Torquil (Junior), Reginald Smith (Charles Emery).
189	17	"A Handful of Crocodiles"	Missing	N/A	1 January 1961
Donald Churchill (William), Carol White (Veronica), John Salew (Mr Bright), Simon Oates (Alex), Margery Withers (Rebecca), Maureen O'Reilly (Anne), Roger Snowdon (Sidney), Sheila Steafel (Vera), John Abineri (Hobson).
190	18	"Till the Day I Die"	Missing	N/A	8 January 1961
Joan Miller (Doctor Aaronson), Edward Judd (Captain Lewis), Ralph Michael (Colonel Macaulay), Joseph Furst (Ekhart), André Charisse (Doctor Laffont), Patrick Maynard (Kurt), Peter Zander (Hans), Hugo de Vernier (Jean), Gordon Honey (First Guard), Geoffrey Stoneman (Second Guard), Jo Crawford (ATS Girl), Robert Perceval (Captain Costan), David Jarrett (Peters), Joan Colin (Bailey), Anthony Sagar (Evans), Paul Williamson (Manning), Norman Bowler (Potter).
191	19	"The Mystery of Martin Wheeler"	Missing	N/A	15 January 1961
Sam Wanamaker (Doctor Lester Wenfield), Don Borisenko (Martin Wheeler), John Alderson (Doctor Carl Hanover), Alan Gifford (Doctor Hardie), Karel Stepanek (Doctor Ira Warren), Pamela Alan (Mrs Florence Wenfield), Nellie Hanham (Mrs Wheeler), Ivan Beavis (Mr Wheeler), Patricia English (Young Woman), Lionel Burns (Mr Mason), Lorne Cossette (Party Guest), Stevie Wise (Vera Gresham), Nicholas Bennett (First Drugstore Assistant), Sheldon Allen (Second Drugstore Assistant).
192	20	"The Picture of Dorian Gray"	Missing	N/A	22 January 1961
Dennis Price (Lord Henry Wotton), Jeremy Brett (Dorian Gray), John Bailey (Basil Hallward), Basil Dignam (Alan Campbell), Jill Ireland (Sybil Vane), Roger Williams (Parker), J. Leslie Frith (Francis), Paul Cole (Call Boy), Bernard Dudley (Romeo), Raymond Barry (Waiter), Peter Zander (Victor).
193	21	"Honeymoon Postponed"	Exists	TR16	29 January 1961
Paul Rogers (Ezra Fitton), Patience Collier (Elizabeth Fitton), Lois Daine (Violet Fitton), Alison Bayley (Lucy Fitton), Harry Hutchinson (Leslie Piper), Derren Nesbitt (Geoffrey Fitton), Trevor Bannister (Arthur Fitton), William Kendall (Joe Thompson), David Brierley (Natt Taylor), Bernard Fox (Barman), Billy Milton (Pianist), Jack Howarth (Uncle Fred).
194	22	"A Degree of Murder"	Missing	N/A	5 February 1961
Kevin Stoney (Edgar Marr), Annabel Maule (Anne Marr), Margery Withers (Estelle), Dudy Nimmo (Lisa), Michael Bangerter (Arthur Marr), Mary Wylie (Miss Oaks).
195	23	"Strangers in the Room"	Missing	N/A	12 February 1961
Donald Houston (Paul), Siân Phillips (Ruth), Wilfrid Lawson (Frank), Mary Ellis (Miriam), Richard Pasco (Bryan).
196	24	"The Money Makers"	Missing	N/A	19 February 1961
Ted Allan (Paul Finch), Gene Anderson (Marge Lovell), Harry H. Corbett (Ralph Sherman), Anna Cameron (Julie Beckford), Sean Sullivan (Nicholas Lovell), John Meillon (Michael Beckford), Olga Lowe (Maggie Webster), Nancy Bacal (Secretary), Vic Wise (George), Jose Berlinka (Designer).
197	25	"Tune on a Apron String"	Exists	TR16	26 February 1961
Marian Spencer (Delia Stanton), Mark Eden (Peter Stanton), Beryl Cooke (Jan), Diana Beaumont (Clarissa), Jessie Robins (Esther), Priscilla Morgan (Jane Stanton), Melanie Rowland (Jacqueline Stanton), Lucy Griffiths (Polly), Patsy Smart (Mrs Leader), Violet Gould (Customer), Anna Cropper (Annette), Geoffrey Wincott (Mr Bresslow), Chris Castor (Pearl), Nilo Christian (Maid), Kathleen Williams (Margaret), William Ridoutt (Porter), Beatrice Varley (Nanny).
198	26	"The Big Deal"	Exists	TR16	5 March 1961
William Franklyn (John Hamilton), Edward Chapman (Sir Pierson Cole), Diana Fairfax (Helen), Paul Curran (Walter Britman), Olga Lowe (Miss Barclay), Tenniel Evans (Andrews), Anthony Sheppard (Carter), Joby Blanshard (Shaftsbury), Geoffrey Chater (Buldoon), Janetta Lake (Girl), Henry Drew (First Man), Humphrey Heathcote (Second Man).
199	27	"The Man Out There"	Exists	TR16	12 March 1961
Patrick McGoohan (Nicholai Soloviov ("The Man")), Katharine Blake (Marie), Jack Watson (Colonel), Clifford Evans (The General), Marne Maitland (Deputy Commander), Hermione Gregory (Olga), Brenda Kaye (Natasha), Martin Sterndale (Professor), Reed de Rouen (MacFarlane), Heather Lyons (Cora), Michael Adrian (Sergeant), Ivan Craig (Dorov), Michael Peake (Boriansky).
200	28	"The Conscientious Gauger"	Missing	N/A	26 March 1961
Duncan Macrae (Alexander Flint), Jean Anderson (Mrs Bell), Peter Sinclair (Andrew), Jack Stewart (Johnson), Brian Murphy (Glowrie), Arthur Lawrence (Ian MacQuarie), Roy Kinnear (Douglas MacIntyre), Nicholas Tannar (Morley), Donald Oliver (Jamie), Ian Sadler (Evans), Kenneth McClellan (First Inspector), Edwin Finn (Second Inspector).
201	29	"The Ways of Love"	Exists	TR16	9 April 1961
Kenneth Haigh (David Enoch), Donald Houston (Charlie Brogan), Zena Walker (Stella Brogan), Elvi Hale (Marjorie Sefton), Elwyn Brook Jones (Manfred), Paul Whitsun-Jones (De Witt), Peter Halliday (Peter Sefton), Graham Crowden (Mark Price), John Abineri (Reporter), Patrick Newell (Reporter), Hester Paton Brown (Reporter), Damaris Hayman (Reporter), Howard Taylor (Interviewer), Maria Caday, Trevor Barnett.
202	30	"The Hero"	Missing	N/A	23 April 1960
Edward Judd (Dave Granick), Meier Tzelniker (Mr Julius), Sheila Allen (Margaret Granick), Stanley Meadows (Harry Granick), Allan Cuthbertson (Mr Pritchard), Riggs O'Hara (First Worker), Alfred Maron (Charlie), Max Baum (Head Presser), Arnold Yarrow (Manager), Valerie Bell (Rose).
203	31	"Danger, Men Working"	Exists	TR16	7 May 1961
Leo McKern (McMahon), Richard Pearson (Trumbull), Patrick McAlinney (Doherty), Barry Keegan (Scanling), Mark Eden (Craig), Dermot MacDowell (First Labourer), Michael Robbins (Second Labourer), Harry Littlewood (Peoples), Gerald McAllister (Toler), Elisabeth Murray (Mary).
204	32	"No Licence for Singing"	Missing	N/A	21 May 1961
Tom Bell (Johnny), Ann Lynn (Annie), Edward Evans (Mr Harris), Michael Coles (Fred), Wilfrid Downing (Bearded Youth), Gordon Phillott (Old Man), Edward Dentith (Publican).
205	33	"Man on the Mountaintop"	Missing	N/A	4 June 1961
Don Borisenko (Horace Mann Borden), Susan Hampshire (Gerta Blake), Alan Gifford (Mr Borden), Gary Cockrell (Charles Blake), David Graham (Willie Bliss), Paddy Webster (Betty Blake), Richard Cuthbert (Doctor Wilson).
206	34	"Duel for Love"	Missing	N/A	18 June 1961
Susannah York (Anna), Alan Bates (Marco).
207	35	"The Ship That Couldn't Stop"	Exists	TR16	2 July 1961
Scott Forbes (Roman), Frank Pettingell (Commodore Grant), Donald Churchill (Michael Holland), Jemma Hyde (Ann Shields), Madeleine Burgess (Mrs Bollanger), Michael Balfour (Mr Bollanger), Richard Klee (Steward), John Collin (Sullivan), Norman Bowler (Wainwright), Philip Stone (Sir Ronald), Harry Webster (Anderson), Michael Caine (Helmsman), Peter Sinclair (Chief Engineer), Graham Corry (Engineer), Ian Anderson (Engineer), Tony Veale (Engineer).
208	36	"The Truth About Helen"	Missing	N/A	16 July 1961
Tony Britton (Michael Fuller), Elvi Hale (Helen), Nicholas Selby (Harry Bloch), Neil Hallett (Captain Charon).
209	37	"The Apprenticeship of Duddy Kravitz"	Missing	N/A	30 July 1961
Jack DeLon (Cuckoo Kaplan), Campbell Singer (Mr Farber), Paul Whitsun-Jones (Paddy Schwartz), Hugh Futcher (Duddy Kravitz), Mark Baker (Rubin), Pat Clavin (Linda Rubin), Peter Boretski (Bernie Greenberg), Michael Graham (Donald Greenblatt), Tom Busby (Sid Rosen), Tom Naylor (Morrie Isaacs), Brian Murray (Irwin Jacobson), Jessie Robins (Mrs Farber), Nicholas Brady (Peter Butler), Vic Wise (Mr Cohen), Charles Irwin (First Guest).
210	38	"The Typists"	Missing	N/A	13 August 1961
Biff McGuire (Paul Cunningham), Jane Arden (Sylvia Payton).
211	39	"The Night of the Apes"	Missing	N/A	27 August 1961
Neil McCallum (Clive Mostyn), Petra Davies (Joy Matthews), Brian Phelan (Steve Matthews), Eynon Evans (Mr Mostyn), Rachel Thomas (Mrs Mostyn), Jessie Evans (Phyllas), Meurig Wyn-Jones (Telegraph Boy), Yvette Rees (Elsie), Kenneth Warren (Maxie), Jeremy Young (Pete).
212	40	"The Omega Mystery"	Exists	TR16	10 September 1961
John Gregson (Butler), Stanley Meadows (Doctor Norman Jones), David Spenser (Shankar Chattalal), Frank Gatliff (Doctor Kendrick), Donald Churchill (Robinson), Miranda Connell (Isobel Gillie), Patrick McAlinney (Michael Diamond), Mavis Walker (Doctor Jepson), Roger Frith (Guard).
213	41	"Looking for Frankie"	Missing	N/A	24 September 1961
Colin Blakely (Ben), Patricia Healey (Anne), Brian McDermott (Frankie), Barbara Young (Flo), Roy Godfrey (Harry), Thomas Gallagher (Old Jim), Edward Cast (Smudge), Joan Ingram (Big Kitty), Harry Littlewood (Gus), Godfrey James (Higgs), Ronald Pember (Young Len), Henry Soskin (Crasher), Ray Mort (Tubby).
214	42	"The Rose Affair"	Exists	VT405	8 October 1961
Anthony Quayle (Betumain), Naunton Wayne (Shane), Natasha Parry (Bella), Dudley Foster (Hugo), Joseph O'Conor (O'Riordan), Harold Lang (Johnson), Noel Howlett (Mr Face, Senior), Patsy Rowlands (Sissie), Gary Hope (Mr Face, Junior), Valerie Varnam (Miss Wigg).
215	43	"His Polyvinyl Girl"	Missing	N/A	22 October 1961
Thelma Ruby (Helen Potter), Peter Butterworth (Albert Potter), Nyree Dawn Porter (Mildred), John Fortune (George Potter), Aubrey Morris (Pharmacy Model), Margery Withers (Mrs Craddock), Ray Alderson (Jimmy), Barbara Windsor (Miss Gibbons), Brandon Brady (Mr Fulton), Frank Thornton (Mr Leslie), Sidney Vivian (Mr Wallis), Agnes Bernelle (Miss Cartwright), Patricia Routledge (New Mother), Harold Holmes (New Father), Eddie Brooks (New Son), Philip Becker, Alec Bregonzi, John Hauxvell, Claire Maine, Mike O'Connor, Riggs O'Hara, Shirley Chapman, Bryan Drake, Bernard Martin, Norma Morgan, Anna Peters, Norman Platt, Philip Todd, Ilse Wolf.
216	44	"Roll on Bloomin' Death"	Missing	N/A	5 November 1961
Harry H. Corbett (Private Mogridge), Simon Oates (Sergeant Maggs), Michael Robbins (Lance Corporal Taylor), Martin Friend (Private Schwartz), John Kelland (Lieutenant Babington), Bryan Mosley (Sentry), Godfrey James (Driver), Peter Layton (Signaller), Patrick Kavanagh (Major Harris), Ronnie Reeves (Runner), Jonathan Scott (Private Green), Timothy Harley (Private Reid), Philip Locke (Private Smith), Dickie Owen (Colour Sergeant), Norma Griffin (Girl's Voice), Declan Harvey (German Soldier).
217	45	"The Trouble With Our Ivy"	Exists	VT405	19 November 1961
John Barrie (Mr Chard), Laurence Hardy (Mr Tremblow), Gretchen Franklin (Mrs Chard), Dandy Nichols (Mrs Tremblow), Roddy McMillan (Joe Muggins).
218	46	"Murder Club"	Missing	N/A	3 December 1961
Barbara Murray (Virginia Douglas), Patrick Magee (Mr Morger), Richard Briers (Stanley Frelaine), Charles Lloyd-Pack (Doctor Swan), Patience Collier (Stanley's Mother), Harold Berens (O'Donnevan), Doris Rogers (Landlady), Steve Plytas (Venusian Compere), John Maitland (Frelaine's Hunter), Edwin Finn (Spotter Three), John Ringrose (Spotter One), Danny Daniels (Policeman), Robert Mooney (Man).
219	47	"Tune on the Old Tax Fiddle"	Missing	N/A	17 December 1961
Raymond Huntley (Mr Gaunt), Norman Rossington (Toby Dickson), John Le Mesurier (Mr Elvin), Vivienne Martin (Robbie), Henry McGee (Mr East), June Ellis (Emmy), Peter Thomas (Hokey), Hazel Gardner (Dancer).
220	48	"The Rank and File"	Missing	N/A	31 December 1961
Kenneth J. Warren (William Kilcoyne), Bruce Boa (Gabe Brewster), David Cargill (Tony Russo), Paul Maxwell (Andy Kovaric), Graydon Gould (Riley), David Bauer (Irving Werner), Arnold Bell (Henders), Robert Clothier (Jamie Dickson), Mary Webster (Martha Brewster), Roland Brand (First Guard), John Boyd Brent (Checker), Ken Wayne (Vice-President), James Dyrenforth (Parker), Gene Sandys (Eaton), Eric Lane (Hacker), John Maitland (Older Man), Edmund Glover (Farrell).

=== Series 6 (1962) ===
Following a hiatus of four months, the series returned to transmission in May 1962, with the episodes initially broadcast weekly, while the last three episode were broadcast fortnightly, there was also a brief mid-season break during August. At 11 episodes long, this was the shortest run during Newman's tenure, although a further episode "The Trial of Dr. Fancy" was taped but pulled from transmission by the ITA as they feared the play would cause offence, it was subsequently transmitted at the start of Series 9 in 1964. Robert Muller contributed two plays that series, including "Night Conspirators" and "Afternoon of a Nymph". The later being a stinging exposé of the underbelly of the entertainment industry. Muller would go onto write five more plays for the programme during the course of the decade. The kitchen sink element was gradually dropped from the series, after Newman announced "no more plays about 'kitchen sinks', unless they are brilliant", although realist plays continued to be commissioned, they became more infrequent.

No. overall	No. in series	Title	Archival status	Archival medium	Original release date
221	1	"Night Conspirators"	Exists	TR16	6 May 1962
Peter Wyngarde (Werner Loder), John Robinson (Franz von Markheim), John Arnatt (General von Schlitz), Cyril Luckham (Doctor Wolfgang Himmelmann), Ronald Radd (Karl-Heinz Fessel), Peter Arne (The Old Visitor), George Sperdakos (The Ambassador), Shusha Assar (The Ambassador's Wife), David de Keyser (The Man in the Shadows), Mark Petersen (The Young Visitor).
222	2	"Girl in a Birdcage"	Missing	N/A	13 May 1962
Janet Munro (Juliet), Brenda Bruce (Miss Johns), Diana King (Kathy Stanton), Diana Beevers (April), Judy Parfitt (Toni Jeffries), Katie Fitzroy (Peggie), Pamela Conway (Taffy), Cynthia Michaelis (Young Officer), Norma Griffin (Ruby), Mavis Walker (Sullivan), Audrey Muir (Scots Officer), Gwynne Whitby (Miss Dollis), Lynne Barton (Sheila), Nadia Cattouse (Betsy), Katherine Page (Sister).
223	3	"Night Stop"	Missing	N/A	27 May 1962
Alfred Lynch (Eddy), John Bonney (Gary), Derrick Sherwin (Ray), Fanny Carby (The Bride), Barry Keegan (The Corporal), Rosemary Dorken (Barmaid), Pauline Munro (Julie), Stella Tanner (Mavis), Billy Cornelius (First Man), Alex Farrell (Second Man), Melody O'Brian (Young Girl), Ian Parsons (Ronnie), Sean Barrett (Ralph), Donald Webster (Steve), Robert Mansell (Alex).
224	4	"The Irish Boys"	Missing	N/A	10 June 1962
Patrick Bedford (Mick), Norman Rodway (Joe), Marie Kean (Mrs Carmody), Maureen Davis (Peggy Winston), Morris Perry (Hill), Valerie Bell (Brenda), Julie Samuel (Shirley), Barry Letts (Clive Epworth), Rodney Bewes (Barman), Michael Bird (Man on Train), Sheena Marshe (Claire), Harry Webster (Drunk), Murray Hayne (Derek), Reginald Smith (Magistrate).
225	5	"Dumb Martian"	Missing	N/A	24 June 1962
William Lucas (Duncan Weaver), Ray Barrett (Alan Whint), Hilda Schroder (Lellie), Garfield Morgan (Reception Clerk), Charles Morgan (Chief), Michael Bird (Harry), Mike Pratt (Mac), Morris Perry (Alastair), Raymond Adamson (Withers).
226	6	"The Hard Knock"	Exists	VT405	8 July 1962
Colin Blakely (Pat Greevey), J. G. Devlin (Da Greevey), Sylvia Kay (Mary Greevey), Ronald Lacey (Trevor Williams), Frank Finlay (Franco Angers), Lynne Furlong (Lil), Lois Daine (April), Kenneth Keeling (First Fat Man), Anthony Cundell (Second Fat Man), Alison Bayley (Ma Greevey), Coral Atkins (Rita), Alan Barry (Derek), Angela Douglas (Angela), Jill Tilsley (Barmaid).
227	7	"North City Traffic Straight Ahead"	Missing	N/A	22 July 1962
Joan Miller (Emmie Hopkins), John Meillon (Harry Hopkins), Wesley Murphy (Donal), Aubrey Morris (Mossie), Pauline Boty (Anna).
228	8	"The Fishing Match"	Exists	TR16	19 August 1962
Kenneth Griffith (Reuben), Peter Butterworth (Boney), Edward Evans (Alfred), Colin Campbell (Peter), Yootha Joyce (Cissy), Jo Rowbottom (Kath), Derek Jacobi (Eric), Brian Coburn (Cherry Brandy Man), Gordon Waine (Leather Jacket).
229	9	"Nothing to Pay"	Exists	TR16	2 September 1962
Clifford Evans (Louis Shell), Kenneth Griffith (Lydiat Shell), Daphne Slater (Eleanor Shell), Philip Madoc (Vladek), Margaret John (Jane Shell), Henry Manning (Smith), Bill Meilen (Dai), Talfryn Thomas (Walt), John Barrard (Emrys).
230	10	"The Scene Shifter"	Missing	N/A	16 September 1962
Patrick Wymark (Manny Barnes), James Maxwell (Father Brady), Harry Towb (Enoch O'Connor), John Tate (Bly), Lisa Peake (Rose Kawayka), Gordon Sterne (Schroder), Bettina Dickson (Lily), Ken Wayne (Parker), Ruth Porcher (Mother Benedict), Denise Barker (Sister Scholastica).
231	11	"Afternoon of a Nymph"	Exists	VT405	30 September 1962
Janet Munro (Elaine), Ian Hendry (David Simpson), Peter Butterworth (Ronnie Grimble), Jackie Lane (Ginger), Patrick Holt (Rogers), Aubrey Morris (Joe, the Make-Up Man), Betty Baskcomb (Elaine's Mother), Jeremy Lloyd (Lord Tony Bright), Tony Calvin (Assistant Director), Michael da Costa (Cameraman), John Dalton (Clapper Boy), William Gaunt (Romeo), Stephen Hancock (Journalist), Ian Hughes (Photographer), April Wilding (Blonde Starlet), David Bauer (Mr Greene), Tom Taylor (Greene's Assistant).

=== Series 7 (1962-3) ===
This series was the last for Newman as producer, who would depart from ABC when his contract expired in December 1962 to take on the position of Head of Drama at the BBC. He was succeeded by Leonard White who took over as producer mid-way during the series run starting with "Into the Dark", White had acted in a couple of plays in earlier series, and had produced the spin-off shows including Out of This World and Armchair Mystery Theatre, along with the first two series of The Avengers. He would go onto to have the longest run as producer, staying on until Series 14 in 1969.

No. overall	No. in series	Title	Archival status	Archival medium	Original release date
232	1	"Dead Letter"	Missing	N/A	14 October 1962
Ruth Dunning (Ethel Batty), Brewster Mason (Chris Batty), Laurence Hardy (Stan Batty), Patricia Burke (Lorna Batty), Gwen Cherrell (Mrs Kay).
233	2	"Always Something Hot"	Exists	TR16	28 October 1962
Ronald Lacey (Tom), Frank Finlay (Bosun), Philip Locke (Sid), Michael Coles (Ginge), Patrick Duggan (Paddy), Will Stampe (Bert), Jay Huguely (First Motor Cyclist), Michael Lehrer (Second Motor Cyclist), Frank Thornton (Frank), Bryan Mosley (Sam), Gretchen Franklin (Else), Reg Lye (Dad), Roger Avon (Weedon), Derek Marlowe (Albert), Charles Bird (Uncle Jack).
234	3	"Thank You and Goodnight"	Missing	N/A	11 November 1962
Ian McShane (Roddy Cain), Sarah Badel (Veronica), John Stratton (Barry), Peter Bowles (Pete), Reg Lever (Stage Manager), Julie Samuel (Brenda), Bruce Taylor (Ticket Inspector), Hazel Wright (Eleanor).
235	4	"The Big Ride"	Exists	TR16	25 November 1962
André Morell (Elver Trask), Derek Francis (Percy Grey), Brian Wilde (Simon Trask), Barry Keegan (Gaffney Stewart), Frank Sieman (Spotty), Douglas Blackwell (Bill), Terence Woodfield (Johnny), Toke Townley (Smithy), Victor Platt (Harry Gregg), Yvette Wyatt (Sylvia), Frederick Farley (Lord Hippendale), Terence Knapp (Bert Smallwood), Gwynne Whitby (Mrs Trask), Johnson Bayly (Telephone Engineer), Desmond Davies (Draughtsman), Vincent Charles (Frank).
236	5	"Joker"	Missing	N/A	9 December 1962
Kenneth Haigh (Harry), Diane Clare (Jenny), Michael Meacham (Robin), Michael Williams (Paul), Yvonne Buckingham (Brenda), Marina Martin (Sue), Charlotte Selwyn (Guest), Alan Haywood (Guest).
237	6	"Hear the Tiger, See the Bay"	Exists	TR16	23 December 1962
Ethel Gabriel (Ma Lacey), Dandy Nichols (Mrs Watteau Jones), Clifford Evans (Dada), Rachel Thomas (Mrs Thomas), Michael Robbins (Maurice Lacey), Anne Robson (Hilda Lacey), John Glyn-Jones (Edwards), Norman Wynne (Sergeant), Frederick Steger (Medical Superintendent), Terence Knapp (Alec Wintle), Patricia Samuels (Nurse), Henry Manning (Donald).
238	7	"Blue and White"	Exists	TR16	6 January 1963
James Villiers (Paul), Frances White (Liz), David Saire (David).
239	8	"The Hot Potato Boys"	Exists	TR16	20 January 1963
Gerald James (Captain Culver), Paul Curran (Oliver Handy), John Bluthal (Pils), Mary Miller (Joan Culver), Betty Baskcomb (Mrs Marlin), Anthony Sharp (Commodore Marlin), Margery Mason (Mrs Culver), Danvers Walker (Sub-Lieutenant Godfrey Marlin), Lisa Peake (Hong Kong Anna), André Charisse (Passenger), Richard Klee (Police Inspector), Joe Enrico (Lascar), Stanley Ayres (Donkeyman), Douglas Cummings (Greaser), John Waite (Photographer).
240	9	"Into the Dark"	Exists	TR16	3 February 1963
Peter Sallis (Alfred Purdie), Norman Rossington (Sydney Martin), Wendy Craig (Valerie Dodds).
241	10	"Paradise Suite"	Exists	TR16	17 February 1963
Carroll Baker (Lena Roland), Sam Wanamaker (Frank Engel), Ian Holm (Jamie Norton), Derek Smith (Donald V. Stavely), Jess Conrad (Bell Hop).
242	11	"The Cruel Kind"	Missing	N/A	17 March 1963
Percy Herbert (Arnold), Fanny Carby (Cissy), Ronald Radd (Kirkham), Michel Ray (The Boy), Paul Dawkins (Mercer), Michael Robbins (Waring), Gerald C. Lawson (Old Man), Charles Denville (Second Man), Rex Robinson (Russell), Tracey Lloyd (Jenny).
243	12	"The Invasion"	Exists	TR16	31 March 1963
Fanny Rowe (Clarissa Hedge-Hacking), Athene Seyler (Lady Corm), Patrick Wymark (Royston Land-Price), Eleanor Summerfield (Heather Land-Price), Clive Morton (Charles Hedge-Hacking), Harry Tardios (Pablo), Gregory Phillips (John Land-Price), Grahame Aza (Peter Hedge-Hacking), Bill Shine (Wing Commander Flighty), Gordon Phillott (Simpson), James Cossins (TV Commentator), Winifred Dennis (Monica Motto).
244	13	"Power and Glory"	Missing	N/A	14 April 1963
Alfred Marks (The Marshal), Paul Daneman (Doctor Galen), Alfred Burke (Baron Sterne), Gerald Cross (Professor Kraemer), Mavis Walker (Secretary), Gerald Sim (Journalist), Alan Edwards (Official), Job Stewart (Paul, The Marshal's Son), Philip Stone (General Branka), Anthony Cundell (Reporter), John Matthews (Reporter), Edwin Finn (Patient), Vincent Harding (Adjutant), Paul Bacon (Military Attaché), Lynn Redgrave (Anetta, The Marshal's Daughter), Daniel Thorndike (Foreign Minister), Edward Kelsey (Mob Leader), Rex Robinson (Man in Crowd).
245	14	"Wagger"	Exists	TR16	28 April 1963
Stephen Lewis (Wagger), Jennifer Wilson (Anne), Bert Palmer (Bill), George Moon (Tom), Juliet Mills (Rose), Tim Pearce (Tony), Jo Rowbottom (Jill), Ann Tirard (Miss Beachams), Clare Kelly (Mary), Peter Hempson (George).
246	15	"Jungle Juice"	Missing	N/A	12 May 1963
Derek Godfrey (Banbury), Kenneth J. Warren (Curly), Jane Barrett (June), Redmond Phillips (Gutser), Bill Kerr (McKinney), Lloyd Lamble (Johnson), Ed Devereaux (Regan), Michael Collins (First Policeman), John Matthews (Second Policeman), Ray Edwards (Boatman), Bruce Wightman (Merv), Gwenda Wilson (Celia), Walter Sparrow (Bluey), Herbert Nelson (Steve), Morris Perry (Ray).
247	16	"The Wednesday Caller"	Missing	N/A	26 May 1963
Ethel Gabriel (Alice), Jeremy Lloyd (Nigel), Derek Nimmo (Andrew), Fiona Hartford (Lavinia), Gwynne Whitby (Mrs Wigginton), Rita Webb (Mrs Beatty), Patricia Samuels (Sarah), Suzanne Vasey (Denise), Jeremy Wilkin (Jay).
248	17	"The Monkey and the Mohawk"	Exists	TR16	9 June 1963
Ron Moody (Hamish MacHamish), Brenda Bruce (Gwen), Harry Locke (Joe Kelly), Roy Holder (Willie), Stan Jay (Furnaceman), Freda Dowie (Elsie), Walter Swash (Customer), Johnson Bayly (Customer), John Barrett (Constable).
249	18	"The Pushover"	Exists	TR16	23 June 1963
Frank Pettingell (Ewart Hamilton), Gillian Lind (Florence Hamilton), Jane Eccles (Petal Hamilton), James Beckett (Rikki), David Warner (Steve), Beatrice Shaw (First Matron), Nan Braunton (Second Matron), Dorothy Robson (Third Matron), Margaret Ward (Mrs Elton), Jane Sothern (Barbara), Pauline Delaney (Lottie), Harry Webster (Charlie).
250	19	"Late Summer"	Exists	TR16	7 July 1963
Constance Cummings (Helga), John Stride (David), Yvonne Coulette (Madame), Makki Marseilles (Charlot), Joan Heath (Mrs Dinsdale), Gerard Heinz (Frederick), Denis Carey (Mr Dinsdale), Valerie Bell (Peggy Dinsdale), Roland Brand (First American), David Futcher (Second American).
251	20	"A Little Night Music"	Exists	TR16	21 July 1963
Paul Curran (Adam Shields), Barbara Couper (Jean Shields), Lally Bowers (Dora Tread), Fulton Mackay (Milton Welstead), Geoffrey Whitehead (Anthony Shields).
252	21	"The Snag"	Exists	TR16	4 August 1963
Derek Francis (John Goggin), Gwen Nelson (Madame Emma Mannering), Barrie Ingham (Ed Crayshaw), Patsy Rowlands (Agatha Mannering), Judith Furse (Lady Wittering), June Barry (Jill Goggin), Louida Vaughan (Waitress), Arthur Lowe (Tailor), Brenda Dunrich (Customer).
253	22	"Living Image"	Exists	TR16	18 August 1963
Alec Clunes (Robert Manders), James Villiers (Blackie), Elizabeth MacLennan (Anne), Alexis Kanner (John Manders), Kynaston Reeves (Lord Foden), Bill Wallis (Solar), Harry Baird (Tarkido), Clive Colin Bowler (Piero).
254	23	"A Kind of Kingdom"	Missing	N/A	1 September 1963
Norman Rodway (Joe Kenny), Patrick Bedford (Mick Daly), Maureen Davis (Peggy), Pauline Delaney (Elspeth), Patrick McAlinney (Devoy), Sheena Marshe (Claire), Desmond Perry (Fanning), Kevin McHugh (Kevin), Jim Fitzgerald (Higgins), Brian Waldron (O'Reilly).
255	24	"The Front Room"	Exists	TR16	15 September 1963
Richard Pearson (Wilf), Betty Baskcomb (Mavis), Betty Marsden (Ada), Bert Palmer (Charlie), Bryan Mosley (George), Mary Chester (Muriel), Richard Turner (Undertaker).

=== Series 8 (1963-4) ===
The first full series with Leonard White as producer, although his work as producer is often overlooked by his predecessor Newman's legacy, he continued to commission and produce notable plays for the series Although 22 episodes were transmitted, two further episodes "The Bandstand" and "The Blood Knot" were also produced but dropped from transmission due to scheduling issues, although the latter play's subject matter about apartheid may have been a factor towards its cancellation. White continued to his predecessor's work, by commissioning plays from upcoming writers, including John Hopkins, Andrew Sinclair and Len Deighton respectively

No. overall	No. in series	Title	Archival status	Archival medium	Original release date
256	1	"Mr. Big"	Missing	N/A	29 September 1963
Peter Vaughan (Ralph), Rosemary Leach (Amy), Aubrey Morris (Arthur), George Claydon (Mr Big), Frank Seton (Mr Kelly), Clive Colin Bowler (Boy), Hilary Martyn (Girl), Danny Daniels (Burly Man).
257	2	"Little Doris"	Exists	TR16	13 October 1963
Vivienne Martin (Daphne Perkins), Gladys Henson (Auntie Flo), Gretchen Franklin (Edie Tidy), Bryan Mosley (Stanley Perkins), Charles Lamb (Fred Tidy), Royston Tickner (Ticket Collector), Ian Wilson (Guard), John Crocker (First Railwayman), Malcolm Knight (Second Railwayman), John Holmes' Sam (Charlie Boy).
258	3	"The Chocolate Tree"	Exists	TR16	27 October 1963
Paul Rogers (Israel Strang), Zena Walker (Rachel Strang), Peter McEnery (Stephen Strang), Arthur Pentelow (Peter Strang), Earl Cameron (William Jones), Yemi Ajibade (Jacob Jones), Willie Payne (Waiter).
259	4	"Long Past Glory"	Exists	TR16	17 November 1963
Maurice Denham (Charles), John Le Mesurier (Harry), David Andrews (Roy).
260	5	"The Higher They Fly"	Exists	TR16	1 December 1963
Michael Goodliffe (Fleming), Frederick Jaeger (Truman), John Paul (Gregg), Jill Dixon (Julie), June Thorburn (Doctor Rogers), Mark Eden (Hubb), Andrew Faulds (Captain Crooke), John Trenaman (Forbes), Richard Coleman (Scrivens), Trevor Reid (Carpen), Kenneth Laird (Geoff), Michael Gaunt (Perkins), Jeffrey Ashby (Eddie), Barry Letts (Dawlish).
261	6	"The Swindler"	Exists	TR16	15 December 1963
Ronald Lewis (Alex Waterman), William Lucas (Ed Laurie), Denis Quilley (Dick Sothers), Petra Davies (Grace), Betty McDowall (Bee), Victor Platt (Harry Bentall), Howard Goorney (Morgan), Jan Holden (Joan Laurie), Douglas Blackwell (Frank Hobson), Eric Flynn (Ken Gray), Marcus Hammond (Tea Boy), George Little (Jim Frinton), Katy Greenwood (Marlene), Michael Jenkinson (New Pay Clerk).
262	7	"A Way of Living"	Exists	TR16	29 December 1963
David Buck (Alan), David Davies (Mr Morton), Rosemary Nicols (Jean), Bert Palmer (Mr Corbie), Ruth Kettlewell (Mrs Morton), Beatrice Varley (Mrs Corbie), Annette Robertson (Brenda), Geoffrey Whitehead (Paul).
263	8	"Sharp at Four"	Exists	TR16	12 January 1964
Derek Godfrey (Boatwright), Rosemary Leach (Jean Hobley), John Standing (Sutcliffe), Percy Steven (Jack), Marcus Hammond (Frank), Mona Bruce (Miss Fletcher), Jean Robinson (Miss Durbin), Lynne Ashcroft (Miss Keith-Williams), Valerie Bell (Miss Whitehurst), Murray Hayne (Robert Hobley), Pearl Prescod (Cleaner), Richard Curnock (Mr Andrews).
264	9	"Last Word on Julie"	Exists	TR16	26 January 1964
Joan Miller (Mary), John Bonney (Jimmy), Bill Owen (Raymond), David Sumner (Adam), Patricia Garwood (Helen), Jessica Dunning (Jenny), Sue Lloyd (Julie), Andrew Downie (Jock), Richard Mathews (Michael), Molly Raynor (Mrs Jordan), James Lloyd (Newsreader).
265	10	"The Pretty English Girls"	Missing	N/A	16 February 1964
Jack Hedley (Terry Carter), Caroline Mortimer (Jean), Jennie Linden (Betty), Peter Bowles (Morgan), Michael Rose (Hotel Manager), Jonathan Elsom (Reception Clerk), Edmund Tontini (Leow), Paul Whitsun-Jones (Gerald Laker), Pamela Reed (Miss Jenkins).
266	11	"A Realm of Error"	Missing	N/A	1 March 1964
Andrew Faulds (Derek Plummer), Derek Smith (Jerome Linder), Gwen Cherrell (Gwen Linder), Helen Lindsay (Stella Plummer), Donald Webster (Rigby).
267	12	"Always Ask for the Best"	Missing	N/A	15 March 1964
Stephen Lewis (Jack Cohen), Warren Mitchell (Harry Jacobs), Eira Heath (Ruth Wiseman), Irene Hamilton (Elli Cohen), Lila Kaye (Dinah Wiseman), Jessie Robins (Edna Jacobs), Alfred Hoffman (Phil Morris aka Bonky), Harry Ross (Nat Golden), Peter Birrel (Eddie Isaacs).
268	13	"Mug's Game"	Missing	N/A	29 March 1964
Michael Craig (Cliff Morton), Rosemary Leach (Fay Morton), Walter Fitzgerald (J.H. Dilcroft), David Langton (John Stannaway), Donald Hewlett (Tony Walker), Bert Palmer (Bert Jackson), George Day (First Man), Frank Peters (Second Man), Anne Woodward (Customer), John Denison (Wine Waiter), John Tucker (Waiter), Gregory Scott (Barman).
269	14	"Prisoner and Escort"	Exists	VT405	5 April 1964
Alfred Lynch (Jupp), Norman Rossington (Blake), June Barry (The Girl), Tim Preece (Hoskinson).
270	15	"Cradle Song"	Missing	N/A	12 April 1964
Fay Compton (Victoria), Rosalie Crutchley (Miriam), John Phillips (George), Suzan Farmer (Susan), Nadine Hanwell (Schoolgirl), Susan Tracy (Schoolgirl), Graham James (Dru), Fiona Hartford (Emma).
271	16	"A Nice Little Business"	Exists	TR16	26 April 1964
Diana Dors (Grace Maxwell), William Franklyn (Arthur Maxwell), Anthony Bate (Harry Kemp), Arthur Lowe (Detective Sergeant Wimpole), Mona Bruce (Lady Royce), Haydn Jones (Rudolf Broom), Beatrix Carter (Madame De Krepeny), Mavis Walker (Miss Paul), Rowena Ingram (Mrs Wisden).
272	17	"Pleasure Where She Finds It"	Exists	TR16	3 May 1964
Nigel Stock (Martin), Richard Pasco (Brian), Rosemary Leach (Sheila), Anthony Bate (Stanley).
273	18	"A Jug of Bread"	Missing	N/A	17 May 1964
John Hurt (Joe), Annette Robertson (Anna), Jerry Verno (Tom), Fulton Mackay (Mr Roberts), Bob Grant (Ben), Walter Macken (Paddy), Doreen Andrew (Mrs Mason), Jill Thompson (Maisie), Ruth Kettlewell (Maud).
274	19	"St. Ernie Leatherbound"	Missing	N/A	24 May 1964
Harry Andrews (Ernie Leatherbound), Peter Woodthorpe (Moe), David Andrews (Son), Gladys Henson (Old Dear), Margery Mason (Mum), Julie Samuel (Val), Patsy Smart (First Woman), Avril Fane (Second Woman).
275	20	"That's Where the Town's Going!"	Exists	TR16	7 June 1964
Margaret Johnson (Wilma Sills), Patricia Marmont (Ruby Sills), David Bauer (Hobart Cramm), Larry Cross (George Prebble), Monica Merlin (Aunt Sophie).
276	21	"Exit Joe – Running"	Partial	TR16 SEQ	14 June 1964
Tim Preece (Joe), Keith Barron (Bill Deal), Wendy Varnals (Jenny), Arthur Pentelow (Professor Jude), Neville Smith (Kit), Marcus Hammond (Mike), Terence Woodfield (Don), Catherine Griller (Dixie), Ewan Roberts (Professor Garner), Yvonne Coulette (Mrs Praed), Edward Burnham (Vice-Chancellor).
277	22	"A Certain Type of Silence"	Missing	N/A	28 June 1964
Judy Campbell (Lady Crail), Laurence Hardy (Sir Geoffrey Crail), Robin Palmer (Howard Crail), Patricia Garwood (Joopy), Peter Bowles (Dermot Llewelyn), Henry Oscar (Dobson), Susan Peters (Selena), Peter Hoar (Merton).
NB	NB	"The Blood Knot"	Exists	TR16	N/A
Ian Bannen (Morris), Zakes Mokae (Zachariah).
NB	NB	"The Bandstand"	Exists	VT405	N/A
Donald Pleasence (Timpany), Norah Blaney (Lily Smith), Margaret Vines (Gloria), Alethea Charlton (Daphne), Stanley Meadows (George), Carmel McSharry (Mrs Carlin), Howard Charlton (Man On The Bench).

=== Series 9 (1964-5) ===
This series continued its shift away from the social realist themes of earlier seasons, with plots focussing more on fantasy and horror, such as "The Trial of Dr. Fancy" by Clive Exton which is a surrealist satirical courtroom drama about a Doctor (John Lee) who is accused of performing bizarre medical procedures which was notably held back from transmission for two years over its content, and "The Hothouse" by Donald Churchill, about a supermarket tycoon Harry Fender (Harry H. Corbett) who has become increasingly obsessed with growing exotic plants within his house and turns his property into a hothouse. Notably, this story, along with "The Man Who Came to Die" by Reginald Marsh, marked a rare instance where the writer of the episode, also played a principal role within the cast. This series was met with stiff competition from the BBC's The Wednesday Play which began transmission in October 1964, which was produced by White's predecessor Sydney Newman, and would go onto have a greater impact than Newman's former show. Two further episodes were produced but pulled from transmission, "Unexpected Summer" and "Old Man's Fancy" were cancelled due to scheduling issues.

No. overall	No. in series	Title	Archival status	Archival medium	Original release date
278	1	"The Trial of Dr. Fancy"	Exists	TR16	13 September 1964
Kynaston Reeves (The Judge), Barry Jones (Sir Percy Black), Nigel Stock (Mr Blessington), Ronald Hines (Doctor Harmon), Walter Hudd (Doctor Pilbeam), Dandy Nichols (Mrs Sprat), Norman Bird (Charles Lincoln), John Paul (Mr Carwell), Peter Sallis (Mr Pender), John Lee (Doctor Fancy), Susan Richards (Miss Pettifor), John Boyd-Brent (Clerk of the Court), Langley Howard (Jury Foreman), Malcolm Watson (Usher).
279	2	"The Cherry on the Top"	Exists	TR16	27 September 1964
Robert Lang (Bill Hemmings), Pauline Yates (Flight Officer Audrey Inskip), Mona Bruce (Squadron Officer Perkins), Peggy Sinclair (W.R.A.F. Sergeant Padmore), Anthony Dawes (Squadron Leader Wink Wagstaff), Vivien Lloyd (W.R.A.F. Sergeant Dawson), Kay Gallie (W.R.A.F. Sergeant Killick), Judy Franklin (Flight Officer Sheldrake), Ernest Hare (Landlord), Jerry Verno (Herbert).
280	3	"Something to Declare"	Missing	N/A	4 October 1964
Sylvia Syms (Kay McCone), Jeremy Brett (Plinio Ceccho), Gino Melvazzi (Carabiniero), Franco De Rosa (First Customs Man), Giorgio Piazzi (Second Customs Man), Robert Arnold (Barman).
281	4	"Old Soldiers"	Missing	N/A	18 October 1964
Kenneth More (Wilfred Racey), Rachel Kempson (Mary Racey), Derek Fowlds (Richard Racey), Francesca Annis (Amy Racey), Michael Newport (John Racey), Basil Dignam (Interviewing Officer), Janet Kelly (Betty), Vicky Harrington (Manda), William Wilde (Young Man), Michael O'Halloran (Man in the Street).
282	5	"They Throw It at You"	Missing	N/A	25 October 1964
Julia Foster (Georgie), Megs Jenkins (Ma Waite), Terry Palmer (Judd), Lennard Pearce (Albert Waite), Pauline Munro (Thelma), Jack Smethurst (Dasher), Bert Palmer (Mr Ashton).
283	6	"The Importance of Being Earnest"	Exists	TR16	15 November 1964
Ian Carmichael (John Worthing, J.P.), Susannah York (Cecily Cardew), Patrick Macnee (Algernon Moncrieff), Fenella Fielding (Honourable Gwendolyn Fairfax), Pamela Brown (Lady Bracknell), Wilfrid Brambell (Reverend Canon Chasuble), Irene Handl (Miss Prism), William Redmond (Lane), Charles Lloyd-Pack (Merriman).
284	7	"The Girl in the Picture"	Missing	N/A	29 November 1964
Ruth Dunning (Dora Artingstall), Richard Butler (George Artingstall), Nicola Pagett (Barbara Artingstall), Peter Purves (Danny), Seymour Green (John Courtenay), Naomi Chance (Hetty Courtenay), Vic Wise (Bernie), Johnson Bayly (Barman), Walter Sparrow (Stage Manager), Kathleen Heath (Woman Customer), Margie Young (Woman), Margaret Read (Girl in Dressing Room).
285	8	"Sally"	Missing	N/A	7 December 1964
Vanessa Redgrave (Sally), Nigel Stock (Charles Drummond), Joyce Carey (Mrs Drummond).
286	9	"The Hothouse"	Exists	TR16	13 December 1964
Harry H. Corbett (Harry Fender), Miranda Connell (Charlotte Parsley), Diana Rigg (Anita Fender), Donald Churchill (Gordon Parsley), Michael Darlow (Master of Ceremonies).
287	10	"I've Got a System"	Exists	TR16	3 January 1965
Keith Baxter (Harry), Derek Francis (Walter), Avis Bunnage (Martha), Kika Markham (Val), John Garrie (Tripper), Reg Lever (Binns), Michael Newport (Boy).
288	11	"The Gaming Book"	Missing	N/A	10 January 1965
Geoffrey Keen (Lieutenant-Colonel Weekes), Derek Fowlds (Tom Rogers), Liam Redmond (Burgo Lyon), Derrick Sherwin (Keith Jamison), Jerome Willis (Alister Parkes), Geoffrey Whitehead (Andrew Lafone), Penelope Horner (Mrs Parkes), Fanny Rowe (Mrs Weekes), Seymour Green (Geoffrey Smith), Lauriston Shaw (Vice-President), David Futcher (Corporal), Anthony Baird (Colour Sergeant Geralds).
289	12	"The Lady with the Albatross"	Exists	TR16	14 February 1965
Katherine Blake (Anne Windle), Tim Preece (John Quigley), Carole Mowlam (Vi Waterhouse), Anthony Roye (The Doctor).
290	13	"Putty Medal"	Missing	N/A	21 February 1965
Jack Hawkins (Len Driver), Angela Baddeley (Doris Driver), Eira Heath (Ella Driver), Barry MacGregor (Frank Harper).
291	14	"The Keys of the Cafe"	Missing	N/A	7 March 1965
Ronnie Barker (Grimwood), Margaret Whiting (Betty), Peter Barkworth (Driving Instructor), Lois Daine (Crystal), Constance Chapman (Mrs Shepherd), David Garth (Mr Creed).
292	15	"I Took My Little World Away"	Exists	TR16	14 March 1965
Susannah York (Mandy Hope), John Robinson (Detective Sergeant Leith), John Ronane (Geoffrey Mather), Neil Robertson (Detective Constable Hartley), Janet Rowsell (Dancer At The Party), Clemence Bettany (Sally Gordon), Gary Watson (David Gordon), Norman Mann (Party Guest), Johnny Clayton (Party Guest), Larry Drew (Party Guest), Redmond Bailey (Party Guest), Sherien Panache (Party Guest), Aviva Marks (Party Guest).
293	16	"A Voice in the Sky"	Missing	N/A	21 March 1965
Jack Hedley (Jerry Noble), Ann Bell (Tessa Bright), David Bauer (Robin Erickson), Paul Maxwell (Wallace Vestrey), Denis Goacher (Mike Brixton), Paul Danquah (Flecker), Roberta Huby (Helen), Jolyon Booth (Ken Stokes), Morris Perry (Doctor McFeelan), Lloyd Lamble (Doctor James Pritchard), James Darwin (Le Maitre), Jack Niles (Richek), Richard Coleman (Colonel Orsett), Michael Newell (Peter Winthrop), Michael Finlayson (Assistant).
294	17	"I Loved You Last Summer"	Missing	N/A	4 April 1965
Patrick Bedford (Mick Daly), Marie Kean (Mrs Dunphy), Margaret Anderson (Josie Willoughby), John Cowley (Johnny McEvoy), Dermot Tuohy (Con Mulholland), John McCarthy (Sammy Delahunty), David Kelly ('Dead Man' Sweeney), Elizabeth Davis (Cissie), James Kerry (Noel Dunphy), Angela Lovell (Waitress), Billy Cornelius (Landlord).
295	18	"The Man Who Came to Die"	Exists	TR16	18 April 1965
Reginald Marsh (Detective Inspector Wadcot), Ronald Leigh-Hunt (Michael Richardson), Toby Robins (Jo Richardson), Peter Copley (Doctor Clarkeson), Michael Stainton (Detective Sergeant Bratby), Gretchen Franklin (Mrs Marriott), Viola Keats (Mrs Trevingon), John Gabriel (William Ashcroft).
296	19	"The Incident"	Missing	N/A	25 April 1965
Alan Dobie (Captain Marshall), Norman Rossington (Dave Gregory), Bryan Pringle (Albert Gregory), Victor Winding (Sergeant Fisher), Pauline Munro (Miss Creswell), Alan Rowe (Lance-Corporal Evans).
NB	NB	"Unexpected Summer"	Exists	VT405	N/A
Maxine Audley, James Grout, Walter Fitzgerald, Judy Geeson, Leonard Cracknell, Fiona Hartford, Kathleen Michael, Terence de Marney, Barbara Lott.
NB	NB	"Old Man's Fancy"	Exists	VT405	N/A
Clifford Evans (Sir Harold Richards), Robert Hardy (Jason), Peter Jeffrey (Kenneth), William Mervyn (The Bishop), Meg Wynn Owen (Charlotte), Lillias Walker (Myra), John Denison (Butler).

=== Series 10 (1965-6) ===
This series broadcast into two blocks with a mid-series break between January - March 1966. The series continued to explore a variety of themes, including "The Gong Game" by Michael Herald, which casts Leslie Phillips as Clive Breeze, an ex-RAF veteran who faces a prison sentence after stealing money to help fund his daughter's school tuition fees. White continued to commission plays from upcoming writers including Jack Rosenthal who contributed the story "The Night Before the Morning After" which deals with the self doubts of a prospective Bride and Groom on the night before their wedding. This series also has the highest archival rate for the show during the ABC Era, with only 4 episodes out of a total of 14, that are missing from the archives. This was also the last series to be transmitted on Sundays.

No. overall	No. in series	Title	Archival status	Archival medium	Original release date
297	1	"The Paraffin Season"	Exists	TR16	4 December 1965
Norman Rossington (Eddie), Pauline Yates (Helen Penford), George Baker (Mike), Joss Ackland (Frank Penfold), Mona Bruce (Mrs Wetherly), Tessa Wyatt (Joan Wetherly), Richard Coleman (Mr Wetherly), Maureen Davis (Prudence).
298	2	"The Gong Game"	Exists	TR16	11 December 1965
Leslie Phillips (Clive Breeze), Ewan Hooper (Clive Breeze), Caroline Mortimer (Linda Breeze), Nora Swinburne (Mrs Breeze), Denis Quilley (Bob), James Kerry (Trevor), Margaret Robertson (Ethel), Frank Gatliff (Henry Kay), P. G. Stephens (Pat), Annette Kerr (Lady Minton), Tessa Wyatt (Brenda), April Wilding (Waitress), David Ellison (Sportsmaster).
299	3	"A Cold Peace"	Exists	TR16	18 December 1965
Ian Hendry (Richard Bligh), Britt Ekland (Karen), Roy Dotrice (Donald Timwood), Isabel Dean (Gwen Timwood), David Phethean (Kirby), Kathleen Breck (Marina).
300	4	"The Sweet War Man"	Missing	N/A	1 January 1966
Kenneth More (Major J. Stourman), Neil Stacy (Second Lieutenant J. Mallet), Clive Swift (Medical Officer), Nicholas Hawtrey (Adjutant), Conrad Monk (Escort), Keith Bell (Mess Orderly), Roger Mutton (Orderly Officer).
301	5	"Ready for the Glory"	Missing	N/A	8 January 1966
Ann Todd (Lady Pruella Baynton), Colin Blakely (Able Seaman Walter Adge), Stephen Murray (Lord Graham Baynton), Terence Alexander (Starkey), Frances White (Pud).
302	6	"Neighbours"	Exists	TR16	15 January 1966
Ruby Dee (Vicky Kingsbury), Donald Harron (Chuck Robinson), Toby Robins (Mary Robinson), Dick Gregory (Bill Kingsbury).
303	7	"The Pity of It All"	Exists	TR16	22 January 1966
Billie Whitelaw (Nancy Harper), Nigel Stock (Walter Daymer), Ann Firbank (Elizabeth Daymer), Jack Watson (Mr Frost), Maureen Pryor (Mrs Frost), John McKelvey (H. J. Finch), Patricia Shakesby (Marjorie), Hal Galili (Waiter).
304	8	"Man Without a Mortgage"	Exists	TR16	19 March 1966
Donald Churchill (Walter Tilley), Terence Alexander (Frank Garland), Sally Bazely (Irene Mayhew), Fabia Drake (Mrs Tilley Senior), Anne Godfrey (Ann), Margaret Anderson (Joan Tilley), Richard Curnock (Parrish), Carmen Dene (Sharon), Ernest Hare (Commissionaire), Rowena Ingram (Lynne), Leslie Sarony (Busker).
305	9	"The Battersea Miracle"	Missing	N/A	26 March 1966
Charlie Drake (Joey), Edward Burnham (Prime Minister), John Barron (First Official), Robert James (Carruthers), Patrick Troughton (Pete, the Flea [Voice Only]), George Woodbridge (Lord Bancroft), Gerald Turner (Clown), Rex Garner (TV Commentator), Monica Merlin (Vicar's Widow), Keith Pyott (Thawpit), Brian Osborne (Rankin), Robert Russell (First Policeman), David Neal (Second Policeman).
306	10	"The Night Before the Morning After"	Exists	TR16	2 April 1966
Bernard Lee (Daniel Whittaker), Julia Foster (Susan Whittaker), Rodney Bewes (Neville Starkey), Betty Marsden (Eva Whittaker), Trevor Bannister (Hughie), Coral Atkins (Girl).
307	11	"Don't Utter a Note"	Exists	TR16	9 April 1966
Sybil Thorndike (Florence Pringle), Sidney James (Basher Bates), Athene Seyler (Nellie Pringle), Peter Bowles (Police Sergeant), Kathleen Breck (Sally), Peter Copley (Vicar), Tim Preece (Nick), Jack Watson (Arnold).
308	12	"Daughter of the House"	Missing	N/A	16 April 1966
Robert Stephens (Bernie), Alfie Bass (Bert), Paul Whitsun-Jones (Police Constable Witherwell), Gordon Rollings (Monty), Wanda Ventham (Julie), Gerald James (Henry), Anthony Dawes (Police Constable Morgan), Richard Davies (Freddie), Ann Kennedy (Dorinda), Frank Thornton (Station Sergeant).
309	13	"The Walls Came Tumbling Down"	Exists	TR16	23 April 1966
Ronald Fraser (Captain Brickman), Robert Lang (Harold Crombie), Norman Bird (Spooner), William Mervyn (John Quill-Hoyle), Elizabeth Valentine (Samantha), Martin Friend (Keith Stribling), Joan Newell (Esme Crombie), Anna Middleton (Juliette Crombie), Peter Moray (Shopkeeper), Rita Webb (Mrs Croton).
310	14	"The Match"	Exists	TR16	30 April 1966
Lee Montague (Joe Black), John Franklyn-Robbins (Simon Harris), Barbara Lott (Sylvia Craddock), Michael Cadman (Martin Black), Jill Cary (Jane), Michael Robbins (Dave), Ida Goldapple (Helen Black), Wanda Ventham (Milly Craddock), Nicola Pagett (Kitty Black), Arthur Pentelow (Hugh Craddock).

=== Series 11 (1966-7) ===
Like the previous series, this series was also split into two blocks with a mid series break occurring between October 1966 - January 1967. The series was also notable for featuring the pilots for two successful series Never Mind the Quality, Feel the Width and Callan, the latter was initially titled as "A Magnum for Schneider". The plot for the episode was later reworked into the feature film version, along with writer James Mitchell's novelisation of the story. The transmission day for this series was switched to Saturdays, and would continue until Series 13 when ABC lost their weekend franchise following the ITV franchise review.

No. overall	No. in series	Title	Archival status	Archival medium	Original release date
311	1	"Pretty Polly"	Exists	TR16	23 July 1966
Lynn Redgrave (Polly Barlow), Donald Houston (Robert Hook), Zia Mohyeddin (Amaz), Dandy Nichols (Mrs Innes Hook), Gwenda Wilson (American Lady), David David (Clerk), Peter Hoar (Doctor), Poulet Tu (Lorelei Chang), Stuart Cooper (Rick Barlow), Leon Sinden (Archie Critch), Derek Smee (Ambrose), Lillias Walker (Miss Gudgeon), Brian Anderson (Sailor), Vincent Harding (Gunther).
312	2	"The Wager"	Missing	N/A	30 July 1966
Peter Vaughan (Sir Robert Byass), Caroline Mortimer (Penelope Byass), Rachel Kempson (Lady Byass), Paul Stassino (George Mavrides), Daphne Anderson (Gina Mavrides), Anthony Valentine (Mark Mavrides), Nicole Shelby (American Girl), John Miller (Butler), Endré Muller (Jaro), David David (Indra Kapoor), Anthony Gardner (Heckler), Norman Scace (Brown), Edward Brayshaw (Thornton Garfield), Mary Kay (Mrs Bruce), Frank Littlewood (Mayor), Rex Garner (TV Announcer).
313	3	"The One-Eyed Monster"	Exists	TR16	6 August 1966
Rupert Davies (Miffin), Rex Garner (Rick Wilton), Kathleen Breck (Moana), Ann Kennedy (Lois Wilton), John Cater ('Goddy' Dalrymple), Alan Wheatley (Hamish Hendry), Pauline Williams (Woman In Black), Ronald Bridges (Young Man), Edward Caddick (Mulberry), Kenneth Keeling (Fat Man), David Saire (Dominick), Anthony Doonan (Messenger), Totti Truman Taylor (Tall Thin Woman), Ken Parry (Little Fat Man), Helen Finn (Girl), Harry Littlewood (Photographer), Fiona Leyland (Secretary), Miriam Raymond (Blonde).
314	4	"Great Big Blonde"	Missing	N/A	13 August 1966
Maureen Toal (Fran Corish), Joe Lynch (Des Humphries), Patrick McAlinney (Old Humphries), Gerry Sullivan (Charlie Lambert), Marie Kean (Mrs Corish), John McKelvey (Coffey), Howard Charlton (Travelling Priest), Harry Hutchinson (Old Heegan), Maire Hastings (Christine Lambert), Adam Verney (Colm Corish), David Kelly (Totterdel), John Keenan (Pianist).
315	5	"A Fair Swap"	Missing	N/A	20 August 1966
Daniel Massey (John Pitt), Derrick Sherwin (Peter Baynes), David Hutcheson (Sir Wallace Plummer), Hilda Braid (Joan Fielding), Rosemary Martin (Deborah Plummer), Thelma Holt (Tonia), Robert Hornery (Barman), Howard Taylor (Manservant), John Burch (Guntridge), Antony Brown (Morgan).
316	6	"The Signal Box of Grandpa Hudson"	Missing	N/A	27 August 1966
Ian McShane (Geoffrey), Suzan Farmer (Wendy Barrow), Billy Russell (Grandpa Hudson), Margery Withers (Mildred Barrow), John Woodvine (Fred Barrow), Bill Shine (Arthur), Barry Jackson (Sid), Michael Parker (El Sombrero).
317	7	"The Noise Stopped"	Exists	TR16	3 September 1966
Gwen Watford (Diana), Leslie Sands (Sir Henry Merritt), Clare Kelly (Maggie), John Nettleton (Charles), Simon Gough (David), John Harvey (Doctor), Sara Aimson (Ruth), John Barcroft (George).
318	8	"Dead Silence"	Exists	TR16	10 September 1966
Patrick Allen (Detective Chief Inspector Newton), Glynn Edwards (Detective Sergeant Bedford), John Bryans (Sydney Oliver), Joanne Dainton (Carol Shaw), Michael Gaunt (Detective Constable Harris), Jeremy Longhurst (Sergeant Eddie Morgan), Donald Layne-Smith (Pathologist), Anne Blake (Mrs Masters), Ronald Lacey (Len Ferris), Hamilton Dyce (Chief Superintendent Clyde).
319	9	"Barrett Keller - His Mark"	Exists	TR16	17 September 1966
Bernard Bresslaw (Jackie), Christopher Sandford (Rowley), Petra Markham (Dinky), Shelagh Fraser (Mrs Vanderkar), Leslie Lawton (Benny), Sheena Marshe (Coral), Clive Colin Bowler (Leo), Gillian Wray (Susie), Denis Goacher (TV Commentator), John Kidd (Club Manager), Simon Gough (TV Guest), Robert Booth (Floor Manager), Edward Malin (Drunk In Club).
320	10	"Light of the Blue Touch Paper"	Exists	TR16	24 September 1966
Ronald Hines (Jack Elliott), Anna Massey (June Elliott), Neil Stacy (Dennis Sage), Duncan Lamont (Somers), Julie Felix (Singer), Winifred Dennis (Mrs B).
321	11	"The Tilted Screen"	Missing	N/A	1 October 1966
Yoko Tani (Michiko), Fredric Abbott (Morrie), Brian Anderson (Billo), Charles Stanley (Flower Seller), Diane Elliott (Waitress), Terence Donovan (Carrier), Georgie Sterling (Mrs Parker), Reg Lye (Mr Williamson), Nita Pannell (Mrs Williamson).
322	12	"The Three-Barrelled Shotgun"	Missing	N/A	8 October 1966
Michael Crawford (Edward), Katherine Kath (Carole Millard), June Barry (Beth), Walter Gotell (Brian), Totti Truman Taylor (Mrs Lester), John Denison (Mr Lester), Kenneth Colley (Jimmy).
323	13	"The Long Nightmare"	Missing	N/A	15 October 1966
Patrick Macnee (Arthur Jameson), Ursula Howells (Margaret Jameson), Gerard Heinz (Herr Weber), Marion Manisty (Air Hostess), Philip Bond (Ronnie), Geoffrey Sumner (Commander Cartland), Patrick Godfrey (Reporter), Margot Thomas (Reporter), John Quayle (Reporter), Christopher Denham (Reporter), David Hanson (Barman), Frances Pidgeon (Air Hostess), Elma Soiron (Frau Weber), Greville Steele (Guest), Ray Marioni (Guest), Katie Newman (Demonstration Girl), Elaine Wells (Katie), Jacques Cey (Monsieur Gaillard).
324	14	"The Floating Population"	Exists	TR16	28 January 1967
Ian Bannen (Bernard Thompson), Wendy Craig (Marjorie Padfield), Leslie Dwyer (Charlie Woodburn), George Day (Workman), Anthony Collin (Mr Culshaw), Sheridan Grant (Bunty), Noel Davis (Harry), Derek Hunt (Porter), Louise Dunn (Letty Wetherby), Robert Langley (Nicky), June Liversidge (Lucy), Alan Helm (Steward).
325	15	"A Magnum for Schneider"	Exists	TR16	4 February 1967
Edward Woodward (David Callan), Russell Hunter (Lonely), Ronald Radd (Colonel Hunter), Peter Bowles (Toby Meres), Joseph Furst (Rudolph Schneider), Ivor Dean (Waterman), Martin Wyldeck (Detective Inspector Pollock), John Scarborough (Detective Sergeant Jones), Helen Ford (Miss Brewis), Francesca Tu (Jenny), Judy Champ (Secretary).
326	16	"What's Wrong With Humpty Dumpty?"	Exists	TR16	11 February 1967
Donald Houston (David), Katharine Blake (Hilary), Lynn Redgrave (Caroline), John Clark (Sean).
327	17	"Never Mind the Quality, Feel the Width"	Missing	N/A	18 February 1967
Frank Finlay (Patrick Kelly), John Bluthal (Emmanuel Cohen), Dudley Foster (George Gladwin), Venetia Maxwell (Rita), Charles Lamb (Wally), Michael McKevitt (Clerk), Christopher Benjamin (Rabbi Levy), Denis Carey (Father Ryan).
328	18	"Easier in the Dark"	Exists	VT405	25 February 1967
Shelley Winters (Frances), Michael Bryant (The Man), John Garrie (Waiter), Neville Becker (Head Waiter), Mollie Peters (Waitress).
329	19	"Reason for Sale"	Exists	TR16	4 March 1967
Nadja Regin (Ylena Davos), William Lucas (Ben Lewis), Mia Nardi (Anna Davos), John Glyn-Jones (Mr Winslow), Mark Dignam (A Man).
330	20	"The Happy Sacking"	Missing	N/A	11 March 1967
Peter Vaughan (Elmo Frankfurter), Jim Norton (Dug Whitby), Carole Mowlam (Barbara Whitby), Mona Bruce (Edna Peatie), Frederick Piper (Sam Polegate), Barry Letts (James Peatie), Christine Rodgers (Janet), Antony Barton (Newcombe), Richard Young (Fuller), Roger Avon (Joe Nash).
331	21	"The Exploding Azalea"	Missing	N/A	18 March 1967
Kenneth Haigh (Emile), James Maxwell (Sebastian), George Murcell (Beno), Tessa Wyatt (The Girl).
332	22	"Any Number Can Play"	Missing	N/A	25 March 1967
Donald Houston (Psychoanalyst), Adrienne Corri (Mary Lewis), Alex Davion (George Rolls), John Paul (General Smith), Philip Madoc (Carpathian Recruiting Officer), Shivendra Sinha (Indian Orderly), Peter Mason (Adjutant), Anthony Chinn (Second Orderly), John Trenaman (Ops Officer), Bernard Horsfall (Inspector), Alan Brown (Tribunal Officer), David David (Moravian Recruiting Officer), Kenneth Watson (Doctor Stephenson), Iain Sinclair (Chairman), Robert Lee (Mr Li), Horace James (Mr Mabuka), Robert Crewdson (Western Councillor), Jane Jordan Rogers (Woman Councillor), Martin Sterndale (General Wislocki), Sally Alexander (Nurse), Annette Robertson (Joanna), Tracy Connell (Customs Man), Calvin Butler (Coloured Soldier).
333	23	"A World of Time"	Missing	N/A	1 April 1967
Billie Whitelaw (Joyce), Betty Baskcomb (Mrs Gibson), Donald Hewlett (Mark), Sheila Fearn (Roma), Charles Thomas (Donald), Walter Sparrow (Comedian), Bernard Gallagher (Henry).
334	24	"Call Me Daddy"	Exists	VT405	8 April 1967
Donald Pleasence (Hoffman), Judy Cornwell (Janet), Derek Carpenter (Delivery Boy), Derek Scott (Pianist).
335	25	"I Am Osango"	Exists	VT405	15 April 1967
Roy Dotrice (Aaron Toft), Lynn Redgrave (Ivy Toft), Kathleen Michael (Hilda Toft), Ken Jones (Mr Budge), Leon Sinden (Doctor), Mollie Sugden (District Nurse), Frank Gatliff (Randall Davis), Stafford Byrne (Lord Wanstead), Judy Champ (Assistant), Dan Jackson (Osango).

=== Series 12 (1967) ===
This series continued attract writers of calibre to produce noteworthy plays including Terrence Frisby, Emanuel Litvinoff, Fay Weldon and Richard Harris respectively. "Poor Cherry" by Weldon, was unusual for the series as it was written by a female writer, the story focusses on Cherry (Dilys Laye) whose troubled marriage to Brian (John Wood) is further strained when she has an affair with Philip Rick (Peter Arne) a candidate at a by-election campaign, in which she's involved in. Shortly before the first episode of this series aired, it was announced following the ITV franchise review in June 1967, ABC would lose their weekend franchise and be forced to merge and form a joint company with Rediffusion, which would be called Thames Television, that would begin transmissions the following year.

No. overall	No. in series	Title	Archival status	Archival medium	Original release date
336	1	"Compensation Alice"	Exists	TR16	1 July 1967
Sheila Hancock (Alice), Robert Lang (Wilfred), Susan George (Girl in Boutique), Adrienne Posta (Petula), Joan Benham (Beryl Rudge), John Savident (Cecil), Margaret Nolan (Lisa), William Ellis (Toni), Pamela Miles (Miss Cherry), Billy Milton (Man in Car Park), Janet Bruce (Manageress in Cafe), Catherine Kessler (Sharon), Donna Reading (Secretary).
337	2	"Slight Formality"	Missing	N/A	8 July 1967
Michael Craig (Alex Marshall), Virginia Stride (Caroline Marshall), Errol John (Carew).
338	3	"Quite an Ordinary Knife"	Missing	N/A	15 July 1967
Judy Parfitt (Giulia Donelli), William Squire (Paolo Bracchiani), Jeremy Brett (Sergio Rovino), T. P. McKenna (Meno Donelli), Renata Roman (The Signorina), Marie Makino (Old Lady).
339	4	"Another Branch of the Family"	Missing	N/A	22 July 1967
Bernard Cribbins (Charlie Barker), Margery Mason (Hilda Kern), Ewan Hooper (Harry Clopstone), Freddie Jones (Seymour), Douglas Mitchell (First Taxi Driver), Ray Browne (Second Taxi Driver).
340	5	"Love Life"	Exists	VT405	29 July 1967
George Baker (Theodore Quill), Diana Coupland (Dodie Mercer), Pauline Delaney (Josie Hanrahan), Pauline Collins (Mary Murtagh), Martin Dempsey (Milligan), Carmen Munroe (Nurse), Bill Golding (Mossy Lawlor), Evelyn Lund (Miss Tatlow), Jack Niles (Surgeon), Gabrielle Walsh (Angela), Liz Davis (Aileen), Maurice Good (Tommy), John Kay (Michael).
341	6	"The Education of Corporal Halliday"	Exists	VT405	5 August 1967
Gary Bond (Corporal Halliday), George Sewell (Staff Sergeangt Graham), John Keightley (Captain Danbury-Lewis), Peter Williams (Lieutenant-Colonel Dobie), John Nettleton (Major General McAllister), Bernard Archard (Sir Adrian Campbell), Peter Mason (R.S.M.), Anita Prynne (Secretary), Ron Daniels (Corporal), Arthur Griffiths (Orderly Sergeant), John Tate (Mr Halliday), Brian Harrison (M.P. Corporal), Richard Steele (Brigadier Joy), Helen Ford (Waitress).
342	7	"Nursery Tale"	Missing	N/A	12 August 1967
Katharine Blake (Rachel), Jean Anderson (Nanny), Powys Thomas (James), Fiona Walker (Nurse), Charlotte Selwyn (Assistant), Nellie Hanham (Manageress), Olwen Brookes (Bookshop Assistant).
343	8	"Marriage and Henry Sunday"	Exists	TR16	19 August 1967
Warren Mitchell (Henry Sunday), Gwen Watford (Bertha Morris), Donald Morley (Albert Segal), Lynda Marchal (Lena), Michelle Ser (Julie Morris), Talya Vashti (Bernadette Stitch), Shirley Patterson (Waitress), Damaris Hayman (Mary Wheatley-Jones), Eve Gross (Sophie).
344	9	"The Girl"	Missing	N/A	26 August 1967
Joss Ackland (Mr Green), Brenda Bruce (Miss Cathcart), Shelagh Fraser (Mrs Green), Janina Faye (Felicity Mellors), Dennis Waterman (Tony), Stephen Whittaker (Marco), Rodney Archer (O'Brien), Kaplan Kaye (Tom-Tom), Anthony Villaroel (Frank), Carol James (Angela), Siobhan Taylor (Katie), Christine Cauldrey (Joan).
345	10	"Split Level"	Exists	TR16	2 September 1967
Robin Bailey (Mike Pinfold), Sally Bazely (Jessica Hardy), Richard Leech (Grant), William Fox (Tanner), Maurice Jones (Landlord), Roderick Jones (Dai), Martha Gibson (Chambermaid).
346	11	"Poor Cherry"	Exists	VT405	9 September 1967
Dilys Laye (Cherry), Judy Cornwell (Abbie), Gwen Nelson (Rita), Jane Birkin (Judy), John Wood (Brian), Peter Arne (Philip Rick), John Glyn-Jones (Andrew).
347	12	"Don't Forget the Basics"	Missing	N/A	16 September 1967
Leo McKern (Archbishop), Robert Eddison (Dean), Henry Woolf (Henry), Tom Criddle (Prime Minister), Dan Meaden (Constable), Arthur Pentelow (Commissioner), Robert Gillespie (Newsreader), Frederick Danner (Reporter), Rex Robinson (Albert Tuppin), Tommy Godfrey (Sir Benjamin), Henry Knowles (Broughton).

=== Series 13 (1968) ===
The final series to air before ABC merged with Rediffusion to form Thames Television on the 30th July 1968, it was also the last series to be shown on Saturdays since the weekend franchise would soon by taken over by London Weekend Television. This series was notable for a number of plays, including "Mrs. Capper's Birthday" which was adapted from a play by Noël Coward, and "The Ballad of Artificial Mash" which aired during ABC Television's final weekend before its handover to Thames. A large number of episodes from this series are missing, with only 4 episodes known to exist in the archives.

No. overall	No. in series	Title	Archival status	Archival medium	Original release date
348	1	"Mrs. Capper's Birthday"	Exists	TR16	3 February 1968
Beryl Reid (Mrs Capper), Sylvia Coleridge (Mrs Loft), Jill Dixon (Audrey Nash), Arthur Lowe (Mr Godsall), Pauline Yates (Maureen), George Baker (Kenny Blake), John Humphry (Bobby McMichael), Denis Goacher (Toby Nash), Richard Coleman (Jack), Richard Curnock (Maurice), Christopher Sandford (David), Christian Fletcher (Michael), Maudie Edwards (Arlene), John Keenan (Jimmy), Jessie Robins (Dolly), Jacqueline Ingles (Doreen), Roderick Jones (Landlord), Tony McLaren (Ernie), Eunice Black (Vera), Penny Brahms (Gloria May).
349	2	"The Wind in a Tall Paper Chimney"	Exists	VT405	10 February 1968
Donald Sinden (Gerald Faulk), Bernard Cribbins (Sam Honeybone), Judy Cornwell (Audrey), John Steiner (Gooch), David Stoll (Killick), Alan Lawrance (Landlord), Jenny White (Geraldine), John Channell Mills (Manager), Billy Cornelius (Sergeant), Anthony Marlowe (Colonel Bean).
350	3	"The Scallop Shell"	Exists	TR16	17 February 1968
Gwen Watford (Dorothy), Stephen Murray (George), Dorothy Alison (Beth), Robert Cartland (Harold), Frances White (Ruth), Eric Woofe (Tom).
351	4	"A Second Look"	Missing	N/A	24 February 1968
Harry H. Corbett (Frank Dolan), Nyree Dawn Porter (Barbara), Richard Vernon (Sir Joseph Bailey), Anthony Collin (Chivers), Toke Townley (Bill), Julia Jones (Doreen), Joan Hickson (Mrs Monkstown), Anthony Dawes (Manager), Jean Benedetti (Waiter).
352	5	"The Contact"	Missing	N/A	2 March 1968
Sara Aimson (Val), Malcolm Armstrong (Bob), Dinah Sheridan (Nan), Peter Macann (Martin), Jessica Dunning (Gwen), Basil Henson (Maurice).
353	6	"A Very Fine Line"	Exists	TR16	9 March 1968
Michael Craig (Frank Guess), Leslie Phillips (Charlton), Gerald Sim (Sutton), Alec Ross (Cooper), Lillias Walker (Sonia), Michael Rogoff, Joanne Dainton (Vicki), Jane Murdoch (Ann), Louis Negin (Dearman), Stephanie Cole (Betty Guess), Jacki Newman (Receptionist), Ron Daniels (Policeman), Pamela Ruddock (Policewoman), Frank Seton (Barman), Peter Flannery (Club Manager), Ian Ainsley (Businessman).
354	7	"Unscheduled Stop"	Missing	N/A	16 March 1968
James Villiers (Robin Fiske), Helen Cherry (Lady Cynthia Carless), Guy Rolfe (Captain Hoskin), Gerald Harper (Ronnie Bruin), Caroline Blakiston (Tessa Marchmore), Michael Smee (TV Reporter), Ernest Milton (Sir Philip Sopwith), Barry Warren (Peters), Ilona Rodgers (Paula), Jan Carey (Mary Carless), Hugh Latimer (Freddie Puckett), Shusha Assar (French Air Hostess).
355	8	"Recount"	Missing	N/A	20 April 1968
Honor Blackman (Ann), Jack Watling (Charles), John Turner (Frank), Jane Birkin (Barbara), Richard Hurndall (Oliver), Richard Warwick (Terry), Gillian Raine (Julia), Alan Lawrance (Man), Beatrice Kane (Woman), Sheelagh McGrath (Maid), Charlotte Selwyn (Secretary).
356	9	"No Easy Walk"	Missing	N/A	4 May 1968
Michael Pennington (Adrian Austen), Arne Gordon (Aaron Stollmeyer), Hazel Penwarden (Naomi Stollmeyer), Michael Turner (Robert Van Huyts), John Berryman (Immigration Officer), Dolores Mantez (Willy Williams), Zakes Mokae (Martin Mphele), Michael McGovern (Davie Van Zyl), Christopher Sandford (Archie Roopmaraine), Erica Rogers (Betty), Carl Badenhorst (Johannesburg Policeman), Jack Morrell (Johannesburg Policeman), Constantin De Goguel (Special Branch Policeman), Billy Cornelius (Special Branch Policeman).
357	10	"The Escape Club"	Missing	N/A	11 May 1968
Stephen Murray (James Wharton), Rosemary Leach (Jane Fordyce), Avice Landon (Mavis Wharton), Michael Bates (Major Mason), Henry Manning (Barman), Michael Robbins (Lowry), Michael Nightingale (Bank Manager), Duncan Lamont (Security Man), Gareth Thomas (Reporter).
358	11	"Home Movies"	Missing	N/A	18 May 1968
Glenda Jackson (Ruth), Ray McAnally (Jack), Grant Taylor (Uncle Frank), Viola Keats (Auntie Bo), John Hallam (Westwood), Jasmine Dee (Customer).
359	12	"You and Me"	Missing	N/A	25 May 1968
Yvonne Mitchell (Clare Castell), Billie Whitelaw (Francesca Dunne), Tessa Wyatt (Sophie Castell), Mercia Mansfield (TV Dresser), Sally Alford (TV Announcer), Janet Hannington (Elizabeth), Angela Galbraith (Maid), Aimée Delamain (Lady), Brenda Cowling (Lady), Damaris Hayman (Lady).
360	13	"The Glove Puppet"	Missing	N/A	1 June 1968
Richard Pasco (Hugo), Jacqueline Pearce (Daphne), Ronald Lacey (Arthur), Vickery Turner (Diana), Julian Herington (Jerry), Pamela Ruddock (Belinda), Mark Elwes (Rex), Olga Linden (Brenda).
361	14	"The Three Wives of Felix Hull"	Missing	N/A	8 June 1968
Charles Gray (Felix Hull), Dilys Laye (Martha), Elvi Hale (Dahlia), Fulton Mackay (Mr Ricardo), Patricia Lawrence (Monica), Stanley Meadows (Nigel), Sally James (Susan), Clare Sutcliffe (Rosie), Felicity Gibson (Veronica), Billy Cornelius (Masseur).
362	15	"One Night I Danced with Mr. Dalton"	Missing	N/A	15 June 1968
Donald Churchill (Ellis Dalton), Richard Leech (Edward Parsloe), John Alderton (Peter Muirs), Pauline Collins (Betty Stickney), Christine Rodgers (Secretary), Beatrix Mackey (Mrs Woodward), Kathleen St. John (Beatrice), Evelyn Lund (Millicent), Walter Sparrow (Lorry Driver), Susan Tracy (Mabel Hall), Guy Ross (Hodge), Malcolm Howard (Devine), Tania Trude (Deirdre), Martha Gibson (Catherine), Billy Hamon (Docks), Julian Barnes (Faber), Sally Gosselin (Shirley), Catherine Howe (Sandra), Bonita Shawe (Mary), Ania Marson (Jennifer), Olive Milbourne (Mrs Dalton), Joan Cooper (Florence Parsloe), Adam Verney (James), Ken Campbell (Phil).
363	16	"The Ballad of Artificial Mash"	Missing	N/A	27 July 1968
Alfred Lynch (Norman Dodd), Valerie French (Mrs Dodd), Mark Dignam (Doctor), Derek Francis, Aubrey Richards (Old Farmer), Dawn Beret, Felix Felton, Denis Shaw (Major Fatstock Gadget), John Malcolm, Desmond Stokes (Farmer), Billy Milton, Peter Badger, Gillian Brown (Mrs Fatstock Gadget), The Paper Dolls, Stanley Holloway (Narrator / Lawyer).

== Thames era (1969-1974) ==
=== Series 14 (1969) ===
The first series to air following the franchise merger that formed Thames Television the previous July; it was the last series to be produced by Leonard White and also the final one to be produced and transmitted in monochrome. Following the show's acquisition by Thames, it was no longer aired on Saturday and was moved to a weekday slot instead. Due to the policy of wiping at the time, many episodes from this series were junked, and only one episode "Edward the Confessor" is known to exist in the archives. A further 4 episodes were written for this series but were not taped.

No. overall	No. in series	Title	Archival status	Archival medium	Original release date
364	1	"The Frobisher Game"	Missing	N/A	6 January 1969
Dandy Nichols (Chauffeur's Wife), Bill Fraser (Gardener), Avice Landon (Gardener's Wife), Richard Pearson (Chauffeur), Vanessa Lee (Lady Frobisher), Peter Graves (Sir Lionel Frobisher), Alan Haines, Edward Sinclair, Clive Marshall.
365	2	"A Foot in the Door"	Missing	N/A	13 January 1969
Frank Finlay (David Field), Joe Melia (Alex Braham), Jacqueline Maude (Mary), John Rye (Jerry), Peter Cartwright (Jim), Bryan Robson (Dylan), Ray Browne (Fred), Margery Mason (Mother), Lesley Nunnerley (Betty Field), Frances Cohen (Housewife), Margaret Courtenay (Mrs Dawson), Pam Ruddock (Madge), Jack Wild (Schoolboy).
366	3	"What's a Mother For?"	Missing	N/A	20 January 1969
Mona Washbourne (Harriet), June Whitfield (Angela), Joe Brown (Pete), Arnold Yarrow (Enrico), Claire Davenport (Mrs Katapodis), Christopher Webber (Window Cleaner), Kenneth Waller (Milkman), John Steiner (Nigel).
367	4	"The Mandarins"	Missing	N/A	27 January 1969
Peter Jeffrey (Marsden), Peter Blythe (Lister), Ann Castle (Phyllis Marsden), Veronica Strong (Susan Lister), Ronald Lewis (Cassels), Judy Champ (Secretary), Patrick Waddington (Sir Henry), Edward Evans (Warner), George Woodbridge (The Minister), Roger Hammond (McIver), David Garfield (Pritchard).
368	5	"Go On – It'll Do You Good"	Missing	N/A	3 February 1969
Ronald Fraser (Ledbetter), Jack Woolgar (Higgs), Barbara Couper (Granny), Pauline Yates (Sarah), Yootha Joyce (Alice), Michael Robbins (Joe), Margaret Boyd (First Old Lady), Doris Rogers (Second Old Lady), Nicholas Courtney (Alex), Stephen Follett (Simon), Gaynor Hodgson (Simon's Sister), Milton Johns (Fosdyke), Seymour Green (Vicar), Anthony Dawes (Phelps), Damaris Hayman (Miss Earnshaw), Dennis Richards (Prout), Amy Dalby (Mummy), Tom Georgeson (Chauffeur).
369	6	"The Good Son"	Missing	N/A	10 February 1969
Lee Montague (Eddie), Ruth Dunning (Molly), John Glyn-Jones (Harry), Doreen Aris (Margaret), Helen Cotterill (Dottie), Zuleika Robson (Beverley), Roger Morris (Jimmy), Frank Coda (Alan), Andrew Downie (Older Ferguson Brother), Roy Murray (Younger Ferguson Brother).
370	7	"The Brophy Story"	Missing	N/A	17 February 1969
Neil Stacy (Nigel Best), Ian Ogilvy (David Daumarez-Smith), William Fox (Robinson), Luanshya Greer (Stella), May Ollis (Mrs Brophy), Walter McMonagle (Patrick Brophy), Jenny Oulton (Rowena Best), Morris Perry (Hector White, MP), Haydn Jones (Paulson), Guy Slater (Peter Newsome), Robert James (Saul Martin), Martin Dempsey (Brophy), John Kidd (Roger Haskell), Emily Richard (Waitress).
371	8	"Edward the Confessor"	Exists	TR16	24 February 1969
Beryl Reid (Mrs Blaxill), Ian Holm (Edward Gobey), Alfred Burke (Gland), William Abney (Detective Inspector Sheffield), Michael Dawson (Constable Tapp), Murray Noble (Policeman), Parnell McGarry (Housewife), Miranda Marshall (Woman), Angela Rooks (Y.W.C.A. Woman), Barbara New (Wife), Douglas Blackwell (Husband).
372	9	"The Storyteller"	Missing	N/A	3 March 1969
James Villiers (Derek), Frances White (Jan), Michael Gothard (Brian), Phyllida Law (Greta), Anna Wing (Jan's Mother), George Moon (Jan's Father), Cyd Hayman (Patsy), John Line (Hugh).
373	10	"On Vacation"	Missing	N/A	10 March 1969
Lionel Stander (Patrick Prendergast), Al Mancini (Jimmy), Mavis Villiers (Mrs Prendergast), Stephanie Beacham (Linda, Manicurist), Dawn Beret (Mabel, Chambermaid), Edward Bishop (Karl, Hotel Manager), Tom Busby (Fred, Room Waiter), Clive Endersby (Bobby, Bell-Boy), Karl Held (Eddy, Masseur), David Cargill (Funeral Director), John Bloomfield (Pierpoint B. Huckenbeiner), Penelope Parry (Mrs Huckenbeiner).

=== Series 15 (1970) ===
This was the first series to be produced and transmitted in colour, following the commencement of colour transmissions on both ITV and the BBC on the 15th November 1969. John Kershaw took over as producer along with Lloyd Shirley as executive producer, who would continue in that role for the remainder of the show's run. Notable plays from the "Say Goodnight to Your Grandma" by Colin Welland which deals with the cross-generational differences in a Northern family, the play subsequently won Welland a BAFTA award for Best TV Screenplay in 1971, and "Wednesday's Child" by John Marshall, which was a prequel to the Public Eye episode "My Life's My Own" (1969). From this series onwards, all episodes exist in the archives.

No. overall	No. in series	Title	Archival status	Archival medium	Original release date
374	1	"Up Among the Cuckoos"	Exists	VT625	8 June 1970
Patricia Routledge (Miss Furling), June Jago (Jean), Norman Bird (Walter), Lynn Dalby (Miss Perkins), Charlotte Howard (Jill), Margot Lister (Glad), Gary Waldhorn (TV Reporter).
375	2	"The Others"	Exists	VT625	15 June 1970
Nigel Stock (Robert Williams), Ann Lynn (Claire Williams), Lesley Roache (Jessica), Edward Kemp (John), Helen Hammond (Mother).
376	3	"The World in a Room"	Exists	VT625	22 June 1970
Barrie Rutter (Harry Steffans), Nina Baden-Semper (Annie Steffans), Peter Ellis (Colin), Bill Wallis (Willian Steffans), Vanessa Forsyth (Shirley Staffans), Frank Singuineau (Aaron Willis), Gladys Taylor (Grace Willis), Jumoke Debayo (Rachel Sampson), Stefan Kalipha (Duke), Bloke Modisane (Spencer), Joan Ogden (Landlady), Nadia Cattouse (Blues Singer).
377	4	"The End of the Line"	Exists	VT625	29 June 1970
Ian Holm (Bagley), Robert Harris (Frayne), Esmond Webb (Ticket Collector), Robert Hunter (Train Attendant).
378	5	"Young Man in Trouble"	Exists	VT625	6 July 1970
Donal McCann (Frank), Isobel Black (Margaret), Liam Redmond (Headmaster), David Kelly (Joe), David J. Grahame (Father), Richard Hampton (Peter), Patricia Driscoll (Miss Darcy), Marjorie Hogan (Mother), Jack Connell (First Man), Nigel Darcy (Second Man), Kitty Fitzgerald (Tinker Woman), James O'Connor (Mr Collins), Wendy McClure (Mrs Collins), Julian Watts (Child), Neil Stewart (Child), Clare Stewart (Child), Sally Stewart (Child).
379	6	"The Prime Minister's Daughter"	Exists	VT625	13 July 1970
David Langton (Melville), Joseph O'Conor (Mayland), Sarah Badel (Sylvia Melville), Paul Eddington (Ormston), Helen Lindsay (Elizabeth Melville), John Bryans (Scott-Bower), Mark Kingston (Budd), Kenneth Farrington (Talbot), Richard Mathews (Hunter), Sally Lahee (Lady Drayford), Ian Cooper (Frobisher), Raymond Adamson (Loring), Geoffrey Morris (Speaker), Lindsay Campbell (Sir Gordon Taylor), Arnold Peters (Colson), David Steuart (Forbes), Robert French (Calder), David Hanson (Cornforth), Norman Henry (Yates).
380	7	"A Room in Town"	Exists	VT625	15 September 1970
George Cole (Edwin), Pauline Yates (Betty), Dawn Addams (Margo), Terence Alexander (Frank), Anthony Dawes (Tony), Cheryl Hall (Julie), Reginald Peters (Mr Lester), Joanne Harrington (Joanna), Mary Burleigh (Clare), Gabrielle Blunt (Mrs Barker).
381	8	"Warm Feet, Warm Heart"	Exists	VT625	22 September 1970
Robert Hardy (Albert Purvis), Diana Coupland (Molly Applewick), Rhoda Lewis (Ursula Purvis), Brian Pettifer (Nigel Purvis), Griffith Jones (Marquis Brown), Bruce Myers (Billy Lambeth), Dennis Tynsley (Man), Robert Cardiff (Johnson), Michael Fabian (Messenger).
382	9	"The Second Interview"	Exists	VT625	29 September 1970
Ronald Lewis (Derek Ballantyne), Pauline Yates (Ruth Ballantyne), Ronald Radd (Duckworth), George Belbin (Chairman of Board), Jean Hampson (Receptionist), Jean McFarlane (Duckworth's Secretary).
383	10	"The Company Man"	Exists	VT625	6 October 1970
Peter Barkworth (Bob), Isobel Black (Agnes), Michael Goodliffe (Mr Lancing), Edwin Richfield (Frank Liddel), Tom Chadbon (Stephen Folds), Mitzi Rogers (Jill), Gretchen Franklin (Margery), Madeleine Christie (Aunt), Jason Twelvetrees (Mr Roberts), Jane Bond (Mr Lancing's Secretary), Larry Martyn (Transport Manager), Jonathan Brewster (Thomas).
384	11	"Poor Mother"	Exists	VT625	13 October 1970
Amanda Reiss (Bambi), Colette O'Neil (Elaine), Nicholas Pennell (Graeme), Mona Washbourne (Sister), Ken Jones (Rickie), Sara Aimson (Mrs Brent), Maggie Jones (Wendy), Roger Brierley (Mr Brent).
385	12	"Mrs. Davenport"	Exists	VT625	20 October 1970
Angela Baddeley (Mrs Davenport), Harriett Harper (Julie Spencer), Joyce Heron (Frances), Noel Johnson (Mr Davenport), Celestine Randall (Joan), Joanna Moore Smith (Girl Friend).
386	13	"Say Goodnight to Your Grandma"	Exists	VT625	27 October 1970
Madge Ryan (Nana (Mrs Weston)), Colin Welland (Tony), Susan Jameson (Jean), Mona Bruce (Grannie (Mrs Clarke)), Jane Pembroke (Cressida Jane), Jack Smethurst (Ray), Duggie Brown (Phil), Ralph Watson (Harry), Colin Edwynn (Eric), Ron Davies (Ken).
387	14	"The Dolly Scene"	Exists	VT625	3 November 1970
Sinead Cusack (Anna), Michael Pennington (Tom), Roy Marsden (Gerry Garland), Sharon Gurney (Marian), Basil Henson (Hunter), Stuart Henry (Young Man), John Abineri (Chemist Asst), John Gorrie (Man in Chemist), Venetia Maxwell (Penny), Lee Donald (Party Guest), Renate Roman (Party Guest), Steven Sutherland (Party Guest).
388	15	"Wednesday's Child"	Exists	VT625	10 November 1970
Katharine Blake (Chris North), Prunella Ransome (Shirley), Gary Watson (Charles North), Robin Ellis (Jim Beverly).
389	16	"Still Life"	Exists	VT625	17 November 1970
Margaret Rawlings (Patricia), Michael Goodliffe (David), Rachel Herbert (Theona), Michael Beint (Trevor).

=== Series 16 (1971) ===
This series was noteworthy for several plays, including "Detective Waiting" by Ian Kennedy Martin, that deals with a young CID officer Lewis (Richard Beckinsale) who tries to prove himself by cracking an unsolved case, an early example of the gritty realist police dramas that Kennedy Martin would later specialise in, such as The Sweeney, Juliet Bravo and The Chinese Detective. "Office Party" by Fay Weldon, which delves into the retirement party of a bank manager Mr. Moore (George A. Cooper) who becomes aware of rapidly changing world around him, and "Will Amelia Quint Continue Writing 'A Gnome Called Shorthouse'?" by Roy Clarke, a comedy drama about a semi retired novellist Amelia Quint (Beryl Reid) who is attemptedly coaxed from her life in Italy, to write another best-selling novel.

No. overall	No. in series	Title	Archival status	Archival medium	Original release date
390	1	"Ireland, Mother Ireland"	Exists	VT625	3 August 1971
Denys Hawthorne (Paul Kincaid), Barry Keegan (Patrick Fitzpatrick), Sam Kydd (Conor Ingram), Bill McGuirk (Charles Ryan), P. G. Stephens (Tony Murphy), Paddy Joyce (Hercules), Derry Power (Pretty Boy), Dermot Tuohy (Chaplain), Dick Sullivan (Delamere), Barry Linehan (Chief Prison Officer), Michael Guest (Second Prison Officer), Wesley Murphy (Prison Officer Hayes), Frank Dunne (Daly, the Poet), Desmond Jordan (Duffy), Declan Mulholland (Fourth Prison Officer), Chris Gannon (Trusty), Jim Fitzgerald (Redmond), Liam Gaffney (Governor), John J. Carney (Fifth Prison Officer), Shane Connaughton (Sixth Prison Officer), Shay Gorman (Russell Street), Mary Quinn (Mrs Street).
391	2	"Bargain Hunters"	Exists	VT625	10 August 1971
Robert Lang (Arthur Jones), Dawn Addams (Cynthia Fenton), Dudley Foster (Tom Fenton), Ann Beach (Mrs Drayton), Jennifer Clulow (Josie).
392	3	"Office Party"	Exists	VT625	17 August 1971
Peter Barkworth (Dickie), Ray Brooks (Paul), George A. Cooper (Manager), Angharad Rees (Julia), Venetia Maxwell (Rachel), Peter Denyer (Cracker), Giles Block (Roy), Jane Hilary (Boofie), Diana King (Audrey), Susan Field (Esther), Georgina Simpson (Ellen), Jackie Afrique (Typist).
393	4	"The Loving Lesson"	Exists	VT625	31 August 1971
Colette O'Neil (Mary), Donald Churchill (Harry), Nicholas Clay (Paul), Michael Standing (Jack), Geoffrey Lumsden (Headmaster), Diane Grayson (Rosemary), Phillada Sewell (Joanna), Denis Huett (Julian), Raymond Mason (Bill).
394	5	"Brown Skin Gal, Stay Home and Mind Bay-Bee"	Exists	VT625	7 September 1971
Billie Whitelaw (Ruth), Donal McCann (Roger), Anna Cropper (Olga), Ann Firbank (Joanne), Mark Kingston (Arthur), Brenda Cowling (Mrs Knowles), Alison Hughes (Girl), Cheryl Hall (Waitress), Bernadette Milnes (Barmaid), John Saunders (Interviewer), James McManus (Gould).
395	6	"Detective Waiting"	Exists	VT625	14 September 1971
Richard Beckinsale (Lewis), Barry Linehan (Cummins), Bryan Pringle (Arthur), Arthur White (Laidlaw), Robin Wentworth (Bassock), James Mellor (Beck), Harry Hutchinson (Roadsweeper), John Hollis (Blond), Michael Brennan (Bonning), John Ash (Boy), Michael Logan (Harding), Cynthia Bizeray (Girl).
396	7	"The Girl on the M.1"	Exists	VT625	21 September 1971
Roddy McMillan (Alec), Sharon Duce (Veronica), Terence Rigby (Jack), Frances Tomelty (Student), Trudi Van Doorn (Student), Theresa Watson (Maudie), Paul Angelis (Ted), Roy Hanlon (Mac), Michael Goldie (Bill), Barrie Houghton (Fred), Lawrence Douglas (Donald), David Mowat (Puppy Seller), Gil Sutherland (Priest).
397	8	"Will Amelia Quint Continue Writing 'A Gnome Called Shorthouse'?"	Exists	VT625	29 September 1971
Beryl Reid (Amelia), Richard Vernon (Lewis), Geoffrey Chater (Miles), Norman Rossington (Guilio), Sheila Steafel (Miss Tindall), Sally Bazely (Hilda), David Warbeck (Nico), Hugh Morton (Father Morelli), John Baddeley (Cyril), Ann Tirard (Miss Grout), Margaret Anderson (Woman Journalist).
398	9	"Competition"	Exists	VT625	5 October 1971
Michael Jayston (Jimmy), John Thaw (Tony), Anne Carroll (Joyce), William Relton (Ray), Patsy Blower (Debbie), Jacqueline Maude (Registrar), George Waring (Official), Rhoda Lewis (Mrs Hawkins), Keith Chegwin (Maxwell), George Avory (John Carter), Mark Willis (Peter), George Collis (Michael).
399	10	"Man Charged"	Exists	VT625	12 October 1971
Glyn Houston (Detective Inspector Isaacs), Nerys Hughes (Christine Tenton), Garfield Morgan (Calvin), Jack Woolgar (Mr Grey), Patrick Holt (Gerrard Beynon), Bunny May (Detective Constable Farrar), William Marlowe (Detective Constable Waters), Hazel Coppen (Mrs Straker), Royston Tickner (Detective Sergeant Clarke), Michael Elphick (Robert Delmonde), Michael Ripper (Harry), Reg Lye (Charlie Gutteridge), Ray Lonnen (Detective Constable Compton), Marcus Hammond (Detective Constable North), Simon Cord (Ronald Thomas).
400	11	"Father's Help"	Exists	VT625	19 October 1971
Michael Craig (Chris), Jill Melford (Martha), Jean Anderson (Mrs Harrogate), James Villiers (Billy), Margaret Anderson (Mrs Ellis), Julian West (Jeremy), Hilary West (Peter), Stella Tanner (Eileen).

=== Series 17 (1972) ===
Kim Mills took over as producer for this series, she also directed several plays in earlier and subsequent series. This series was troubled by political controversy when one of the plays "The Folk Singer" by Dominic Behan, ran into a dispute with the ITA with its subject matter, since it was a black comedy about The Troubles in Northern Ireland at the time that delved into both sides of the conflict. The play was eventually transmitted, albeit a later time slot than usual.

No. overall	No. in series	Title	Archival status	Archival medium	Original release date
401	1	"The Left Overs"	Exists	VT625	22 August 1972
Anton Rodgers (Mike), Ann Bell (Jane).
402	2	"Whatever Became of Me?"	Exists	VT625	29 August 1972
John Thaw (Peter), Beth Harris (Mary), Norman Shelley (Mr Burgess), Joanna Dunham (Diana).
403	3	"A Touch of the Victorians"	Exists	VT625	5 September 1972
June Brown (Ruth Preston), Peter Glaze (Arthur Preston), Michael Spice (Terry Fryer), Frances Tomelty (Caroline Young), Struan Rodger (Stuart Tebbs), Peter Honri (Bill), Frederick Hall (Mr Brewington), Frederick Bennett (Frank), Herbert Ramskill (Stephen), Hilda Barry (Elsie), Leslie Dwyer (Jack).
404	4	"High Summer"	Exists	VT625	12 September 1972
Margaret Leighton (Lady Huntercombe), Roland Culver (Lord George), Christopher Gable (Jack), Nerys Hughes (Amy Sprott), Donald Hewlett (Donovan), Carleton Hobbs (Langham), Lalla Ward (Lady Margaret), Joseph Blatchley (Freddy), John Carlin (Crown Prince), Jay Neill (Masham).
405	5	"Franklin's Farm"	Exists	VT625	19 September 1972
Maureen Pryor (Kathie), Shane Briant (Nicky), Ursula Howells (Prue), Jack Watling (Philip), Max Wall (Reinhardt).
406	6	"A Fluid Arrangement"	Exists	VT625	26 September 1972
Richard Pearson (Jack), Victor Maddern (Ernie), Fanny Carby (Ivy), Pat Heywood (Nancy).
407	7	"On Call"	Exists	VT625	3 October 1972
Edward Petherbridge (Roy), Jane Lapotaire (Jean), Michael Coles (Dick), Jo Rowbottom (Annette), Richard Vernon (Doctor Edwards), Kathleen Byron (Elizabeth), Margaret Anderson (Jennifer), Brian Vaughan (Raymond), Dorothy Gordon (Night Sister), Christopher Banks (Coroner).
408	8	"The Creditors"	Exists	VT625	10 October 1972
Susannah York (Tekla), Kenneth Haigh (Gustave), Anthony Corlan (Adolph).
409	9	"The Breaking of Colonel Keyser"	Exists	VT625	17 October 1972
Colin Blakely (Keyser), James Cossins (Partridge), Paul Eddington (Vandenburgh), Donald Sumpter (Dellow), Dennis Waterman (Goodall), Basil Henson (Oxted), Jack May (Watts), Anthony Langdon (Musgrove), Dennis Blanch (Bambridge), Peter Mayock (Parker), Richard Henry (Kirby), Mark Allington (Private), Richard Steele (Cook Staff Sergeant), Carl Rigg (Diplock), Susan Brown (Naafi Girl), Roger Rowland (Parsons), Jonathan Gardner (Avery), Jonathan Collins (Ticehurst).
410	10	"Anywhere But England"	Exists	VT625	31 October 1972
Denholm Elliott (Miles), John Le Mesurier (Freddie), Denise Buckley (Jennifer), Jean Harvey (Ilse), Mike Pratt (Stanley), John Stratton (Jimmie), Malya Woolf (Maria), Alex Scott (Paul), Marc Urquhart (Nicholas), Ray Lewis Quartet (Band), Derek Smith (Argotti), John Gabriel (Salesman).
411	11	"The Folk Singer"	Exists	VT625	7 November 1972
Tom Bell (Danny Blake), Celia Bannerman (Miss Arrowroot), Bernard Spear (Eddie Reubens), J. G. Devlin (Waiter), Bill Nagy (Professor Malone), Declan Mulholland (Protestant Man), Phyllis McMahon (Protestant Wife), David Atkinson (Catholic Priest), Maggie Fitzgerald (Catholic Wife), Steve Benbow (Guitarist), Harry Towb (First Workman), Frederick Hogarth (Second Workman), Ann Murray (Lady Psychiatrist), Allan McClelland (Hotel Manager), Tim Hardy (Jesus Freak), Michael Elwyn (Officer).
412	12	"The Stumbling Block"	Exists	VT625	11 December 1972
Ronald Radd (Alfred), Avis Bunnage (Lorna), David Cook (Timothy), Harry Towb (Mr Bertram), Judy Loe (Jenny), David Firth (Simon).

=== Series 18 (1973) ===
For this series, Joan Kemp-Welch took over as producer. At the time, Armchair Theatre was increasingly criticised as being an outdated reminder of its theatrical routes, the style of television drama production had moved on by this time. The series continued to feature innovative plays, including "Red Riding Hood" by John Peacock, a psychological reimagining of the fairy tale that deals with deals with a timid librarian Grace (Rita Tushingham) who finds herself drawn into relationship with Henry (Keith Barron) who she believes murdered her grandmother. And "A Bit of a Lift" written and starring Donald Churchill, a bedroom farce comedy which stars Churchill as Frank, a henpecked husband who contemplates suicide at a hotel when he crosses paths with a couple, Alec (Ronald Fraser) and Penelope (Ann Beach) after he accidentally enters their hotel room.

No. overall	No. in series	Title	Archival status	Archival medium	Original release date
413	1	"The Death of Glory"	Exists	VT625	11 September 1973
Warren Clarke (Billy Turnbull), Bill Maynard (Reg Turnbull), Dandy Nichols (Marjorie), Karl Howman (Spice), Leslie Schofield (Watters), Raymond Witch (Rixon), Tom Georgeson (Barman), John Rapley (Pork Butcher), Jerold Wells (Foulkes), Derek Benfield (Cyril), David Pugh (Parsons), Simone Francis (Sheila), Harold Bennett (Hemsley), John Barrett (Charles), Derek Anders (Recruiting Officer), David Whitworth (Curate).
414	2	"Beyond Our Means"	Exists	VT625	18 September 1973
Katharine Blake (Sylvia Forsyth), Anthony Bate (Oliver Forsyth), Peter Sallis (Onslow), Peter Settelen (Sandy Forsyth), Peter Copley (Doctor Charteris), Sheelah Wilcocks (Mrs Freeman), Kim Braden (Janet Charteris).
415	3	"A Bit of a Lift"	Exists	VT625	25 September 1973
Ronald Fraser (Alec), Ann Beach (Penelope), Donald Churchill (Frank), Denise Shaw (Receptionist), Stafford Gordon (Best Man), Bill Horsley (Vicar).
416	4	"Brussel Sprouts"	Exists	VT625	2 October 1973
John Ringham (Skip), John Kane (Ken), David King (Sir William), Michael Deeks (Bradley), John Sanderson (Steve), Gary Warren (Jeff), Andrew Mussell (Gandy), Anthony Barnett (Tony), Paul Burton (Freddie), David Howe (Ginge), Sean Clark (Mickey), Stephen Butler (John), Richard Mottau (Pete), Nigel Jenkins (Mike), Mario Renzullo (Arnold).
417	5	"Red Riding Hood"	Exists	VT625	9 October 1973
Rita Tushingham (Grace), Keith Barron (Henry), Ursula Hirst (Beattie Glowding), Arthur Hewlett (The Father), Hilda Barry (The Grandmother), Ronald Nunnery (Landlord), Coral Fairweather (Miss Lorrie), George Collis (Delivery Boy).
418	6	"The Square of Three"	Exists	VT625	16 October 1973
Gordon Jackson (Major Broome), Anthony Allen (Johnny Orange), Colin Farrell (Captain), Tony Selby (Sergeant), Christopher Beeny (Lance Corporal), David Troughton (Henry), John Duttine (New Soldier), Peter Sproule (Corporal), Moira Garrell (Receptionist), Brian Badcoe (Padre), Denise Buckley (Marion), Susan Field (Mrs Orange), Michael Guest (Old Soldier).
419	7	"Vérité"	Exists	VT625	23 October 1973
Annabel Leventon (Shirley), Richard Morant (Clive), Tim Curry (Mik), Beth Porter (Barbara), Arthur English (Carlyle), Sam Isaacs (M'Wamba), Matthew Scurfield (Harvey), Nadim Sawalha (Gosh).
420	8	"The Golden Road"	Exists	VT625	30 October 1973
Olive McFarland (Cass Hunter), Katy Manning (Anna), Joyce Heron (Mrs Hunter), Neville Barber (Jim), Robert O'Mahoney (Bob), Karen Corti (Christy), Elspeth MacNaughton (Headmistress), Angus Mackay (Solicitor).
421	9	"Russian Roulette"	Exists	VT625	6 November 1973
Freddie Jones (Feodor Dostoyevsky), Tessa Wyatt (Anna Snitkin), Pamela Hollyer (Servant), Steve Gardner (Pasha), Caroline Hunt (Polina), Paul Moriarty (Alexy), Julie May (Emilia), Anne Blake (Frau Flaumann), Eric Dodson (Gonoharov), Peter Madden (Meyer), George Pravda (Goldstein), Michael Ely (Waiter), William Kenton (Croupier).
422	10	"That Sinking Feeling"	Exists	VT625	13 November 1973
Nikolas Simmons (Tom), Dorothy Primrose (Sybil), Pat Heywood (Vi), Geoffrey Bayldon (Norman), Anna Barry (Marion), James Cossins (Eric), Patricia Quinn (Maggie), Michael Elphick (Chopper), Jenny Twigge (Carol), Frank Thornton (Arthur), Royce Mills (Usher), Reginald Barratt (Photographer), Jacqueline Maude (Bride's Mother), Candy Baker (Bridesmaid), Bonia Bradley (Bridesmaid), Mary Land (Pamela), Stuart Saunders (Man at Church), William Redmond (Vicar), Alan Hay (Bride's Father).

=== Series 19 (1974) ===
Kim Mills had returned as producer, this series also has the shortest length of the program's entire run with only 4 episodes long . By the time the final series went into production, Thames decided to hand production duties over to Euston Films which had gradually established itself as a production unit that specialised in producing dramas shot entirely on 16mm film, as opposed to the traditional medium of studio based videotape that had been used at the time. The show was subsequently superseded by Armchair Cinema, which began airing in conjunction with the transmission dates of the episodes during this series. The anthology strand would subsequently return as a spin off series Armchair Thriller, which ran for two series produced between 1978 and 1980.

No. overall	No. in series	Title	Archival status	Archival medium	Original release date
423	1	"If You Can See What I Can See"	Exists	VT625	15 May 1974
Leslie Sands (Trevor Arnold), Anne Carroll (Sonia), Mark Kingston (Alec), Geraldine Moffatt (Diane), Trevor Bannister (Mike), James Bolam (Charlie), Megs Jenkins (Mrs Palmer), Brian McDermott (Andrews), Joan Scott (Ellen), Don Hawkins (Reg), Penny Price (Debbie), Maggie Wells (Receptionist), Ross Livingstone (Richard).
424	2	"Amy, Wonderful Amy"	Exists	VT625	22 May 1974
Anna Cropper (Joanna), Valerie Holliman (Barbara), Tessa Shaw (Amy Johnson), Karen Roberts (Schoolgirl), Kim Butcher (Schoolgirl), Frances Bennett (Vanity Lady in Audience), Yvonne Gilan (Vanity Lady in Audience), Illona Linthwaite (Vanity Lady in Audience), Bob Danvers-Walker (Fantasy Commentator), Linda Cunningham (Hostel Girl), Jumoke Debayo (Nurse), Gloria Connell (Policewoman), Dixon Adams (Pilot), Philip Elsmore (Newscaster).
425	3	"The Virgins"	Exists	VT625	25 June 1974
Godfrey Quigley (Shem Furlong), David Kelly (Cloggy Moore), Desmond Perry (Ambrose Flood), Brian Phelan (Jeremy Leeds), Moira Redmond (Angela Ryder), Brenda Fricker (Pat Moran).
426	4	"According to the Rules"	Exists	VT625	9 July 1974
Liam Redmond (Charles Menton), J. G. Devlin (Tom Flaherty), James Berwick (Chief Inspector Flaherty), Olive Maguire (Brian Menton), Fedelma Cullen (Judith), Des Cave (Detective Sergeant O'Brien), Paul Farrell (Jack Conway), Sheila Manahan (Mary Flaherty), Aidan Murphy (Adrian Flaherty), Desmond Jordan (Doctor), James Greene (Bank Manager), Harry Webster (Bank Director), Allan McClelland (Maurice O'Connor), Ritchie Stewart (Tommy), Marcella O'Riordan (Sheila), Bill Hamilton (Michael), Bert Lena (Lift Attendant).
