= ITV Sunday Night Theatre =

British television anthology series (1969–1974)

- Also known as: ITV Saturday Night Theatre
- Theme music composer: Laurie Holloway
- Country of origin: United Kingdom
- Original language: English

Production
- Production company: Various ITV companies

Original release
- Network: ITV
- Release: 11 January 1969 – 5 May 1974

ITV Sunday Night Theatre, originally titled ITV Saturday Night Theatre and often shortened to simply Sunday Night Theatre or Saturday Night Theatre, is a British television anthology series screened on ITV, whose episodes were contributed by various companies in the ITV network.

== Overview ==
The first episode of the programme was the teleplay Park People by Alun Owen, which aired on 11 January 1969.

Around 200 episodes aired on ITV between 1969 and 1974, including productions of plays such as Long Day's Journey into Night by Eugene O'Neill, A Doll's House by Henrik Ibsen and Arms and the Man by George Bernard Shaw.

Other episodes included adaptations of the works of William Shakespeare, James Joyce, Wilkie Collins, Simon Gray, Sam Shepard, Israel Horovitz, Arthur Miller, August Strindberg, J. B. Priestley, Lanford Wilson and John Mortimer.

== Directors ==
- Michael Lindsay-Hogg
- Anthony Page
- Mike Newell
- Fielder Cook
- Ted Kotcheff
- Peter Wood
- Vivian Matalon.

== Actors ==
Helen Mirren, Laurence Olivier, Peggy Ashcroft, Sean Connery, Anthony Hopkins, Michael Caine, Paul Scofield, George C. Scott, Laurence Harvey, Ralph Richardson, Diana Rigg, Trevor Howard, Pamela Buchner, Glenda Jackson, Diane Cilento, Alec Guinness, Jane Asher, Martin Sheen, Colleen Dewhurst, Jean Marsh, Shelley Winters, Ian Holm, Richard Chamberlain, Edith Evans, John Gielgud, Shirley Knight, Gareth Forwood, Jeff Shankley, Sarah Douglas, Ian McKellen, George Sanders, Michael Gambon and Margaret Whiting.

== Episodes ==
=== "Wicked Women" ===
"Wicked Women" is a six-episode drama series, produced by London Weekend, which aired as part of the second series of Saturday Night Theatre, based on true-life cases of women whose stories featured prominently in Victorian newspapers after they murdered or attempted to murder various people. These included Alice Rhodes (played by Joanna Dunham), Christiana Edmunds (Anna Massey), Augusta Fullam (Vivien Merchant), Anne-Maria Moody (Jane Asher), Florence Maybrick (Nicola Pagett) and Madeleine July (Billie Whitelaw). The first episode went to air on 28 February 1970.

=== Series 1 ===
Year	Ep.	Title	Notes
11 January 1969	1	"Park People"	Written by Alun Owen. Directed by Peter Willes & produced by Yorkshire Television. Starring Julian Glover, Elizabeth Shepherd & Zena Walker.
18 January 1969	2	"Bangelstein's Boys"	Starring June Ellis, Christine Hargreaves and Del Henney.
25 January 1969	3	"My Bonnie Jean"	Starring John Cairney, Ewan Roberts, Colette O'Neil, David McKail & John Laurie.
1 February 1969	4	"MacNeil"	Starring Sean Connery, Anna Calder-Marshall, Roddy McMillan & Jo Rowbottom. Narrated by Laurence Olivier.
8 February 1969	5	"Cornelius"	Starring Michael Caine & Anna Calder-Marshall. Narrated by Laurence Olivier.
15 February 1969	6	"Emlyn"	Starring Paul Scofield, Anna Calder-Marshall & Geoffrey Chater. Narrated by Laurence Olivier.
22 February 1969	7	"Tiger Trap in the Street"	Starring Michael Craig, Rosemary Leach, Larry Dann, Angela Douglas & Frederick Hall.
1 March 1969	8	"An Hour of Love: The Bind"	Starring Dandy Nichols, Bill Owen & Edward Petherbridge.
1 March 1969	9	"An Hour of Love: Anatomy of a Divorce"	Starring Julian Glover & Barbara Leigh-Hunt.
8 March 1969	10	"The Piano Tuner"	Starring Frank Finlay, Daphne Slater & Shelagh Fraser.
15 March 1969	11	"Pig in a Poke"	Starring Joan Benham, Colin Blakely, Donald Sumpter, Clifford Cox & John Harvey.
22 March 1969	12	"Machine"	Written by Hugh Charteris. Starring Roy Battersby, Rachel Gurney, Ray McAnally, Michael Sheard & William Squire.
	13	"Episode #1.13"	Starring
5 April 1969	14	"The Dirt on Lucy Lane"	Starring Michael Robbins, Robert Urquhart, Justine Lord, Hannah Gordon, Jim Norton & Maurice Quick.
12 April 1969	15	"Moonlight on the Highway"	Starring Ian Holm, Anthony Bate, Deborah Grant, Robin Wentworth, John Flanagan & Bart Allison.
19 April 1969	16	"Hazel and Her New Gas Cooker"	Starring Patricia Routledge, Jack Hedley, Ken Jones & June Brown.
26 April 1969	17	"Steve"	Starring Billy Murray, David Sterne, Rudolph Walker, Isobel Black, Jon Finch, Maureen O'Brien, Richard Shaw, Richard Hampton & Derrick Slater.
3 May 1969	18	"Toys"	Starring Michele Dotrice, John Breslin, Janina Faye, Ronald Lewis, Hilary Mason & David Wood.
10 May 1969	19	"Rogue's Gallery: The Bright Eyed Body Snatcher"	For Granada. Starring Sandra Bryant, Michael Balfour, Jonathan Adams, John Cater, Diane Cilento, Jim Dale, John Woodnutt, Danny Sewell, Windsor Davies, Alan MacNaughtan, George Murcell, Ann Tirard & Terence Wilton.
17 May 1969	20	"Rogue's Gallery: The Wicked Stage"	Starring Diane Cilento, Jim Dale, John Woodnutt, Sandra Bryant, Michael Balfour, Arthur Lowe, Bruce Purchase, Rosalie Crutchley, Danny Sewell, Ian McShane, Roger Hammond, Dennis Chinnery, Robert Lankesheer, Ann Tirard & Marc Boyle.
24 May 1969	21	"Rogue's Gallery: The Timorous Rake"	Starring Sandra Bryant, Michael Balfour, Diane Cilento, Jim Dale, Danny Sewell, John Woodnutt, Raymond Huntley, Maria Charles, Edward Sinclair, Michael MacKenzie & Ann Tirard.
31 May 1969	22	"Rogue's Gallery: The Fearful Image"	Starring Michael Balfour, Sandra Bryant, Diane Cilento, Jim Dale, Danny Sewell, John Woodnutt, Morag Hood, Barry Andrews & Ann Tirard.
7 June 1969	23	"Rogue's Gallery: A Bed Full of Miracles"	Starring Michael Balfour, Sandra Bryant, Diane Cilento, Jim Dale, Danny Sewell, John Woodnutt, George Woodbridge, Daphne Heard, Francis Matthews, Steve Plytas, Ann Tirard, Griffith Davies & Clifford Cox.
14 June 1969	24	"Rogue's Gallery: The Prude Pursued"	Starring Michael Balfour, Diane Cilento, Sandra Bryant, Jim Dale, Danny Sewell, John Woodnutt. Anthony Nicholls, Milton Johns & Ann Tirard.
21 June 1969	25	"The Innocent Ceremony"	Starring Gladys Bacon, John Bailey, Stephanie Bidmead, Dennis Chinnery, Veronica Turleigh, Gareth Forwood, Madeleine Christie, Sarah Lawson & Joseph O'Conor.
28 June 1969	26	"The Haunting"	Starring John Thaw, Suzanne Neve, Louise Pajo & Michael Lees.
5 July 1969	27	"A Measure of Malice"	Starring Yootha Joyce, John Stratton & Elizabeth Weaver.
12 July 1969	28	"Better Dead"	Starring Lindsay Campbell, Edward Fox, Ann Lynn, David Hutcheson, Ron Moody, James Cairncross & Patsy Smart.
19 July 1969	29	"Every Day of the Life Man"	Starring Timothy Bateson & Oscar James.
19 July 1969	30	"Salve Regina"	Starring Glenda Jackson, Graham Crowden, Miriam Karlin & Al Mancini.
26 July 1969	31	"Takeover"	Starring Norman Bird & Louis Selwyn.
26 July 1969	32	"Two Hundred Miles by Train"	Starring Joe Gladwin.
2 August 1969	33	"The Funeral of Queen Victoria "	Starring Madge Ryan & Sheila White.
2 August 1969	34	"The Garbler Strategy"	Starring Leonard Rossiter, Michael Lees, Anne Cunningham, Patrick Godfrey, Willoughby Goddard & Peter Thornton.
9 August 1969	35	"Travelling Where?"	Starring Richard Beale, Jennifer Clulow, David Daker, Michael Lees, Colette O'Neil, Renu Setna & Richard Shaw.
16 August 1969	36	"Two Feet off the Ground"	Starring Leslie Sands, Avice Landone, Jennifer Hilary, Tony Tanner, Martin Shaw, Blake Butler, David Ashford & John Rees.
23 August 1968	37	"Fly Away Home"	Starring Tony Caunter, George Hilsdon, Bob Todd, David Weston, Peggy Ann Wood & Preston Lockwood.
30 August 1969	38	"The Talking Head"	Starring John Thaw, Michael Craig, Ann Lynn, Edwin Richfield, Robert Cawdron & Godfrey James.

=== Series 2 ===
Year	Ep.	Title	Notes
6 September 1969	1	"Diddled"	Starring Robert Powell.
13 September 1969	2	"Episode #2.2"	Starring
20 September 1969	3	"That Woman is Wrecking Our Marriage"	Starring Ray Brooks & Michael Craze.
27 September 1969	4	"A Walk Through the Forest"	Starring Anthony Hopkins & Sally Faulkner.
4 October 1969	5	"The Undoing"	Starring Robert Cartland, Aubrey Morris, John Nettleton & Kenneth Watson.
11 October 1969	6	"In Another Country"	Starring John Thaw & Hannah Gordon.
18 October 1969	7	"Murder: The Colonel and the Naturalist"	Starring Michael Balfour & Roland Culver.
25 October 1969	8	"Murder: The Blood Relation"	Starring
1 November 1969	9	"It's Called the Sugar Plum"	Starring Maureen Lipman.
8 November 1969	10	"Hester Lilly"	Starring Joan Hickson.
15 November 1969	11	"Aren't We All?"	Starring Maurice Quick.
22 November 1969	12	"The Full Cheddar"	Starring Robin Askwith, Vivien Merchant, Daniel Massey, Robert Hartley, Michael Cashman, Ishaq Bux & John Line.
29 November 1969	13	"The Comic"	Starring Isabel Dean & George Cole.
6 December 1969	14	"Faith and Henry"	Starring Allan Surtees.
13 December 1969	15	"Nora"	Starring June Brown, Robert Powell & Michael Turner.
20 December 1969	16	"It Calls for a Great Deal of Love"	Starring Thora Hird, John Sharp, Eric Thompson & David Ashford.
3 January 1970	17	"Suffer Little Children"	Starring John Lewis Mesurier, Josephine Tewson, Edwin Apps, Graeme Garden, Martin Wyldeck & Dudley Jones.
10 January 1970	18	"Anniversary"	Starring Michael Bryant & Judy Cornwell.
17 January 1970	19	"A Doll's House"	Starring Anna Massey, Julian Glover, George Murcell & Barbara Leigh-Hunt.
24 January 1970	20	"Mrs. Mouse, Are You Within?"	Starring Barbara Leigh-Hunt.
31 January 1970	21	"The Pretenders"	Starring John Bird & Cyril Luckham.
7 February 1970	22	"Wolly Wenpol, the Complete Works"	Starring James Bolam, Robert Hardy, Louise Pajo & Denis Cleary.
14 February 1970	23	"Wicked Women: Alice Rhodes"	Starring Joanna Dunham, Ralph Bates, Henry McCarthy, David Webb & David McKail.
21 February 1970	24	"Wicked Women: Christiana Edmunds"	Starring Anna Massey & Charles Lloyd Pack.
28 February 1970	25	"Wicked Women: Augusta Fullam"	Starring Vivien Merchant, Preston Lockwood, Edward de Souza, Roger Hammond, Albert Moses & Ishaq Bux.
7 March 1970	26	"Wicked Women: Anna-Maria Moody"	Starring Jane Asher, William Lucas, John Stratton & Anthony Jackson.
14 March 1970	27	"Wicked Women: Florence Maybrick"	Starring Nicola Pagett, Paul Shelley, John Carson & Arnold Peters.
21 March 1970	28	"Wicked Women: Madeleine July"	Starring Billie Whitelaw, Shirley Stelfox, Mary Morris, John Collin, Erik Chitty, Geoffrey Cheshire, Hamilton Dyce, Michael Bilton & Geoffrey Hughes.
28 March 1970	29	"The Master and the Mask"	Starring Brian Cox & June Brown.
4 April 1970	30	"The Cork Moustache"	Starring Judy Cornwell.
11 April 1970	31	"Fade Out"	Starring George Sanders, Geoffrey Bayldon & Francis Matthews.
18 April 1970	32	"The Rococo Bush"	Starring Tenniel Evans, Ronald Lacey & Frances White.
2 May 1970	33	"Dangerous Corner"	Starring Moray Watson, Ian Hendry & Nicholas Pennell.
9 May 1970	34	"The Family is a Vicious Circle"	Starring Tom Chadbon.
16 May 1970	35	"When Johnny Comes Marching Home"	Starring
23 May 1970	36	"Lay Down Your Arms"	Starring George Layton, Peter Collier, Leonard Trolley, Graham Armitage, Joby Blanshard, Michael Cashman, Tony Caunter, John Levene, David Webb, Thérèse McMurray, James Cairncross & Will Stampe.
30 May 1970	37	"You See, the Thing Is..."	Starring Ian Holm.
30 May 1970	38	"The Salesman"	Starring Ian Holm.
6 June 1970	39	"Married Alive"	Starring Diana Rigg, Robert Culp, Jean Marsh, James Villiers, Dudley Jones, Zuleika Robson & Mark Elwes
13 June 1970	40	"Playing with Fire"	Starring
20 June 1970	41	"Slattery's Mounted Foot"	Starring Terence De Marney, Jack Woolgar, Kathy Staff & Lynne Perrie.
27 June 1970	42	"Hands with the Magic Touch"	Starring Mark Eden, Ronald Lacey, Saeed Jaffrey & Nicholas Smith.
4 July 1970	43	"The Gingham Dog"	Starring Garrick Hagon & Maureen Lipman.
12 July 1970	44	"Twelfth Night"	Written by William Shakespeare. Directed by John Sichel for ATV. Starring Tommy Steele, Ralph Richardson, Alec Guinness Joan Plowright, Gary Raymond, Adrienne Corri, John Moffatt, Sheila Reid, Richard Leech, Kurt Christian, Christopher Timothy, Edward Arthur, Nicholas McArdle & Jenny McCracken
18 July 1970	45	"Skyscrapers"	Starring Michael Bryant, Vivien Merchant & Maureen Neill.
25 July 1970	46	"The Insider"	Starring Tom Chadbon.
1 August 1970	47	"Dear Janet Rosenberg... Dear Mr. Kooning"	Starring William Squire
8 August 1970	48	"Act of Separation"	Starring Jack Watling, Lisa Daniely & Erik Chitty
15 August 1970	49	"Honour and Offer"	Starring Brian Wilde
22 August 1970	50	"Hodinott Veiling"	Starring Keith Barron & Sylvia Coleridge.

=== Series 3 ===
Year	Ep.	Title	Notes
10 October 1970	1	"The Exiles: Jennie"	Starring Hannah Gordon, James Laurenson & Rudolph Walker.
17 October 1970	2	"The Exiles: Emma"	Starring Hannah Gordon, Rudolph Walker & Alan MacNaughtan.
24 October 1970	3	"The Exiles: Zo"	Starring Hannah Gordon, James Laurenson, William Lucas, Glyn Houston, Edward Hardwicke & Margot Thomas.
31 October 1970	4	"Visit from a Stranger"	Starring Honor Blackman, Philip Brack & John Stride.
19 December 1970	5	"Roll on Four O'Clock"	Starring George A. Cooper, Clive Swift, Kenneth Watson & Jack Shepherd.
26 December 1970	6	"The Policeman and the Cook"	Starring Michael Crawford, Tim Curry, William Lucas, John Normington & Felicity Gibson.
2 January 1971	7	"The Dead"	Starring RayMcAnally, Pauline Delaney
9 January 1971	8	"Tales of Piccadilly: Behind the Spearmint Sign"	Starring Peter Birrel, Alethea Charlton, Claire Davenport, Barbara Leake & Dermot Tuohy.
16 January 1971	9	"Tales of Piccadilly: A Room Full of Holes"	Starring Richard Beckinsale, Sheila Ruskin, Fiona Walker & Arthur Blake.
23 January 1971	10	"Tales of Piccadilly: A Special Occasion"	Starring Christian Rodska.
30 January 1971	11	"Tales of Piccadilly: Out of Town Girl"	Starring Angela Down & Bruce Boa.
6 February 1971	12	"Tales of Piccadilly: A Windmill in the Window"	Starring Neil McCallum, Joseph O'Conor, Michael Turner & Geoffrey Morris.
13 February 1971	13	"Tales of Piccadilly: The Way Out"	Starring Stephanie Beacham, James Hazeldine & Celia Bannerman.
21 February 1971	14	"Big Soft Nellie"	Starring Roy Kinnear, Tony Robinson, Daphne Heard & Derek Francis.
28 February 1971	15	"Anna of the Five Towns"	Starring Gillian Brown.
7 March 1971	16	"Hari-Kali and Sally"	Starring Leonard Rossiter, Godfrey James, Ray Brooks, James Culliford & Reginald Barratt.
14 March 1971	17	"The Hotel in Amsterdam"	Starring Paul Scofield, Isabel Dean, Michael Craig & Jill Bennett.
21 March 1971	18	"Pandora"	Starring Geraldine McEwan, Michael Craig, Trevor Martin & Susan Penhaligon.
28 March 1971	19	"The Price"	Starring George C. Scott & Colleen Dewhurst.
4 April 1971	20	"Arms and the Man"	Written by George Bernard Shaw. Starring Laurence Harvey, John Standing & Charles Lloyd Pack.
11 April 1971	21	"Love Doesn't Grow on Trees"	Starring Ian Hendry, Michael Bryant & Brian Wilde.
23 May 1971	22	"The Silver Collection"	Starring Helen Mirren, Billy Murray & Cyril Luckham.
30 May 1971	23	"The Shopper"	Starring Geoffrey Palmer & Richard Easton.
6 June 1971	24	"Man and Boy"	Starring Telly Savalas, Ed Bishop, David Bauer, Paul Maxwell & Liz Fraser.
13 June 1971	25	"Paper Roses"	Starring Rosalie Williams, Bill Maynard, John Carson, William Simons, Aimée Delamain, Peter Childs, Donald Gee & Dudley Jones.
20 June 1971	26	"The Prize"	Starring Clive Scott.
27 June 1971	27	"Square"	Starring Hermione Baddeley & Edward Fox.
4 July 1971	28	"Alice Dancing"	Starring Sylvia Coleridge, John Nettleton & Paul Greenhalgh.
11 July 1971	29	"Square One"	Starring Patrick Troughton, Michael Aldridge & Frank Mills.
18 July 1971	30	"After a Lifetime"	Starring Neville Smith & Laidlaw Dalling.
25 July 1971	31	"Mr. Pargiter"	Starring Roland Culver, Lynda Bellingham, Clive Morton, May Warden, Lucy Griffiths & Geoffrey Colville.
1 August 1971	32	"One More on Top"	Starring
8 August 1971	33	"Hamlet"	Starring Richard Chamberlain, Michael Redgrave, John Gielgud, Alan Bennett, James Laurenson, Martin Shaw, Godfrey James, Desmond McNamara & Nigel Stock.
15 August 1971	34	"The Chaps"	Starring Frank Wylie.
22 August 1971	35	"Giants and Ogres"	Starring Christopher Neame.
29 August 1971	36	"Green Julia"	Starring June Alliss, John Hurt & Michael Jayston.

=== Series 4 ===
Year	Ep.	Title	Notes
5 September 1971	1	"The Wedding Gift"	Starring Derek Newark, Rachel Herbert, Mona Bruce & Norman Bird.
12 September 1971	2	"Concussion"	Starring
19 September 1971	3	"Fly on the Wall: The General"	Starring Christopher Timothy & John Nettleton.
26 September 1971	4	"Fly on the Wall: The Reformer"	Starring Christopher Timothy & Antony Carrick.
3 October 1971	5	"Fly on the Wall: The Designer"	Starring Christopher Timothy.
10 October 1971	6	"Upstairs, Downstairs: On Trial"	
17 October 1971	7	"Upstairs, Downstairs: The Mistress and the Maids"	
24 October 1971	8	"Upstairs, Downstairs: Board Wages"	Starring Pauline Collins, Jean Marsh, Alethea Charlton & Simon Williams.
31 October 1971	9	"Upstairs, Downstairs: The Path of Duty"	Starring Gordon Jackson, Angela Baddeley, Jean Marsh, Simon Williams & Patsy Smart.
7 November 1971	10	"Upstairs, Downstairs: A Suitable Marriage"	Starring Gordon Jackson, Jean Marsh & James Bree.
14 November 1971	11	"Upstairs, Downstairs: A Cry for Help"	Starring Gordon Jackson, Angela Baddeley, Patsy Smart & Susan Penhaligon.
28 November 1971	12	"The Signalman's Apprentice"	Starring Peter Vaughan, Victor Maddern & Dennis Waterman.
5 December 1971	13	"The Birthday Run"	Starring George A. Cooper, Gerald Flood & Mary Peach.
12 December 1971	14	"Some Distant Shadow"	Starring Peter Vaughan, Colin Jeavons, Michael Hawkins, David Savile, Wendy Gifford & Terence Wilton.
19 December 1971	15	"Second Time Around"	Starring
26 December 1971	16	"Who Killed Santa Claus"	Starring Robert Hardy, John Franklyn-Robbins & Barbara Murray.
2 January 1972	17	"The Midsummer Dream of Chief Inspector Blossom"	Starring Glyn Owen.
9 January 1972	18	"Another Sunday and Sweet F.A."	Written by Jack Rosenthal. Directed by Michael Apted for Granada Television. Starring David Swift, Freddie Fletcher, Anne Kirkbride, David Bradley, & Roy Alon.
16 January 1972	19	"A Man About a Dog"	Starring David Hedison, Kate O'Mara & Geoffrey Bayldon.
23 January 1972	20	"Upstairs, Downstairs: Magic Casements"	
30 January 1972	21	"Upstairs, Downstairs: I Dies from Love"	
6 February 1972	22	"Upstairs, Downstairs: Why is Her Door Locked?"	
13 February 1972	23	"Upstairs, Downstairs: A Voice from the Past"	
20 February 1972	24	"Upstairs, Downstairs: The Swedish Tiger"	
27 February 1972	25	"Upstairs, Downstairs: The Key of the Door"	
5 March 1972	26	"Upstairs, Downstairs: For Love of Love"	
12 March 1972	27	"Whose Life is it Anyway"	Starring Ian McShane, Philip Latham & Donald Hewlett.
19 March 1972	28	"A Summer Story"	Starring Ian Hendry, Jack Hedley & Rio Fanning.
26 March 1972	29	"Major Lavender"	Starring Robert Flemyng, Dinsdale Landen, Leonard Maguire, Basil Moss & Jean Marsh.
2 April 1972	30	"Time Lock"	Starring Paul Eddington, Philip Latham, Robert Beatty & Billy Murray.
9 April 1972	31	"The Last Journey"	Starring Harry Andrews, Patrick Allen, Peggy Ashcroft, Ian McKellen, Paul Eddington, John Stratton, Wayne Sleep, John Garvin & John Challis.
4 June 1972	32	"Ben Spray"	Starring John Alderton, Nicholas Ball, Roger Hammond, Jonathan Elsom & Christopher Biggins.
11 June 1972	33	"It's Good to See You"	Starring Donald Eccles.
18 June 1972	34	"Consequences"	Starring Richard Beckinsale, Joss Ackland & Ysanne Churchman.
25 June 1972	35	"A Marriage"	Starring Mary Peach & Barbara Shelley.
2 July 1972	36	"Madly in Love"	Starring Richard Beckinsale & Madeline Smith.
9 July 1972	37	"Summer and Winter"	Starring Gerald Flood, Bernard Hepton & Frances White.
16 July 1972	38	"The Rose Garden"	Starring Paul Eddington, Lesley Dunlop & John Lee.
23 July 1972	39	"Last Year's Confetti"	Starring Stephanie Beacham.
30 July 1972	40	"Before Paris"	Starring Margaret Whiting & Edward Judd.
6 August 1972	41	"A Bit of Vision"	Starring Roy Dotrice, Clive Revill, Adrienne Corri, Annette Crosbie & John Carson.
13 August 1972	42	"Sharing the Honours"	Starring Jane Asher, Siân Phillips, Rosalind Lloyd, Morris Perry & Bob Keegan.

=== Series 5 ===
Year	Ep.	Title	Notes
1 October 1972	1	"The Vamp"	Starring Shelley Winters & David Wood.
8 October 1972	2	"When the Music Stops"	Starring Donald Churchill, Edward Fox, Mary Peach & Nell Curran.
15 October 1972	3	"When the Wheel Turns"	Starring Michael Bates, Rosemary Leach, Sally Thomsett, David Garth & Gerald Taylor.
22 October 1972	4	"Ted"	Starring Ernest Clark, Patricia Quinn, Michael Culver, Tony Haygarth, Cyril Luckham, Delia Lindsay, Richard Morant & Carmen Munroe.
29 October 1972	5	"The Samaritan"	Starring Tom Bell, Kenneth Cranham & Martin Jarvis.
4 November 1972	6	"Three Months Gone"	Starring Ian Gelder, Geraldine McEwan, Pat Heywood & Stephen Yardley.
12 November 1972	7	"God Send Sunday"	Starring Evin Crowley.
19 November 1969	8	"First Sight"	Starring Sean Bury, Brian Deacon & Nina Thomas.
26 November 1972	9	"Triangles"	Starring
3 December 1972	10	"The Web"	Starring Michael Kitchen, Ann Firbank, Jenny Twigge & Jack Galloway.
10 December 1972	11	"The Guests"	Starring Margaret Leighton.
17 December 1972	12	"The Piano Player"	Starring Gareth Forwood, Clive Revill, Cyril Shaps, William Simons, Angharad Rees, Oliver Gilbert & Keith Ashley.
23 December 1972	13	"Just in Time for Christmas"	Starring Geoffrey Bayldon, Joan Hickson, Fanny Carby & Clive Cazes.
7 January 1973	14	"The Death of Adolf Hitler"	Written by Vincent Tilsley. Directed & produced by Rex Firkin for London Weekend. Starring Frank Finlay, Caroline Mortimer, Peter Blythe, David de Keyser, Michael Sheard, Ed Devereaux, Oscar Quitak, Robert Cawdron, Tony Steedman, Derek Francis, Michael Lees, Michael Turner, Geoffrey Toone, Clifford Rose, Inigo Jackson, John Ringham, Wanda Moore, Clare Jenkins, Julian Fox, Harry Brooks Jr., Richard Hampton, Laidlaw Dalling & Andrew Lodge
14 January 1973	15	"The Staff Room"	Starring Roland Culver, John Nettleton, Daphne Slater & David Waller.
21 January 1973	16	"Sarah"	Starring Ursula Howells, Mark Kingston, Richard Vernon & Pat Heywood.
25 March 1973	17	"Pleased to Meet You"	Starring Michael Coles, Glynn Edwards, Barry Foster & Janet Key.
1 April 1973	18	"The Ruffian on the Stair"	Directed by David Cunliffe for Yorkshire Television. Starring Judy Cornwell & Michael Bryant.
8 April 1973	19	"A.D.A.M."	Starring Georgina Hale, Mark Jones, Richardson Morgan, Willoughby Gray & Anthony Jackson.
15 April 1973	20	"But Fred, Freud Is Dead"	Starring
10 March 1973	21	"Long Day's Journey into Night"	Written by Eugene O'Neill. Adapted by Michael Blakemore & directed Peter Wood for ATV. Starring Laurence Olivier, Constance Cummings, Denis Quilley, Ronald Pickup & Maureen Lipman.
29 April 1973	22	"Harlequinade"	Starring Sarah Douglas, Denholm Elliott, Tom Owen, John Castle, Edith Evans, Charles Lloyd Pack & Christopher Timothy.
6 May 1973	23	"Afternoon at the Festival"	Starring Leo McKern, Donald Pickering & Adrienne Corri.
13 May 1973	24	"The Coffee Lace"	Starring Mary Healey
20 May 1973	25	"Passengers"	Starring John Thaw, Tenniel Evans, James Bate, David Warwick & Ian MacKenzie.
3 June 1973	26	"Willy"	Starring Christopher Gable, Anna Massey, Tony Caunter, Paul Copley, Paul Seed, Brian Miller & John Livesey.
17 June 1973	27	"Lorna and Ted"	Starring Zoë Wanamaker & Brian Blessed.
1 July 1973	28	"Reckoning Day"	Starring Norman Bird & Noel Dyson.
8 July 1973	29	"It Only Hurts for a Minute"	Starring Denholm Elliott, Colette O'Neil & Lesley Dunlop.
15 July 1973	30	"The Intruders"	Starring Julie Dawn Cole.
22 July 1973	31	"Blinkers"	Starring
29 July 1973	32	"Free as a Bird"	Starring June Brown, Percy Herbert & Simon Rouse.
5 August 1973	33	"A Question of Everything"	Starring Nigel Hawthorne, John Castle & Robert Lindsay.

=== Series 6 ===
Year	Ep.	Title	Notes
16 September 1973	1	"Young Guy Seeks Part Time Work"	Starring Bruce Boa, Anna Massey & Anton Rodgers.
23 September 1973	2	"Hopcraft into Europe"	Starring Clive Revill, Geraldine McEwan, Arthur Lowe, Angela Scoular, Diana Quick & Ian Charleson.
28 October 1973	3	"Katapult"	Starring James Bate, Tom Chadbon, Warren Clarke, Paul Freeman, Norman Jones, Tony Melody, Alec Sabin & Graham Weston.
16 December 1973	4	"In the Heel of the Hunt"	Starring Rynagh O'Grady.
23 December 1973	5	"Visitors"	Starring Kathleen Byron, Jennie Linden & Moira Redmond.
24 February 1974	6	"No Harm Done"	Starring Helen Worth, Michael Cashman, Lee Montague, Tony Selby, Rowena Cooper & Michael Forrest.
31 March 1974	7	"Geography of a Horse Dreamer"	Written by Sam Shepard. Starring Iain Cuthbertson, Donal Donnelly, Paul Maxwell, Eddie Powell, T. P. McKenna, Tony Sibbald & Glenn Beck.
7 April 1974	8	"Only the Other Day"	Starring Polly Adams, Michael Byrne, Susan Engel, Derek Fowlds, Derrick O'Connor, Angela Scoular, Richard Kane, Hugh Martin, John Beardmore & Tim Munro.
5 May 1974	9	"There Is a Happy Land"	Starring Bernard Atha, Fred Feast, Christine Buckley, Brian Miller & Bryan Pringle.
11 August 1974	10	"Hearty Crafty"	Starring Richard Briers.
25 August 1974	11	"A Private Matter"	Starring Barry Justice.
20 March 1978	12	"Catholics" (aka "Conflict", "A Fable of the Future" and "The Visitor")	Written by Brian Moore & directed by Jack Gold for HTV. Starring Trevor Howard, Martin Sheen, Michael Gambon, Leon Vitali, Raf Vallone, Cyril Cusack, Andrew Keir & Godfrey Quigley.

=== Other episodes ===
- "A Doll's House" by Henrik Ibsen
