= Special Branch (TV series) =

British TV crime drama series (1969–1974)

- Title card, series 2
- Genre: Police drama
- Starring: Derren Nesbitt; Wensley Pithey; Fulton Mackay; George Sewell; Roger Rowland; Patrick Mower
- Country of origin: United Kingdom
- Original language: English
- No. of series: 4
- No. of episodes: 53 (list of episodes)

Production
- Production companies: Thames (series 1–2); Euston Films for Thames (series 3–4)

Original release
- Network: ITV
- Release: 17 September 1969 – 9 May 1974

Special Branch is a British television series made by Thames Television for ITV and shown between 1969-1970 and 1973-1974. A police drama series, the action was centred on members of the Special Branch counterintelligence and counterterrorism department of the London Metropolitan Police. The first two series starred Derren Nesbitt, before the programme went through an overhaul, with George Sewell taking over as the new lead.

== Production ==
The first two series were shot mainly in a studio on videotape with filmed location inserts; a standard method of the time but one which suffered from jarring differences in picture quality between interior and exterior scenes. The location scenes of some episodes were shot on outside broadcast cameras, leading to smoother transitions between location and studio work for those episodes. Series 1 and 2 starred Derren Nesbitt as Detective Chief Inspector (DCI) Jordan, working for Detective Superintendent Eden (Wensley Pithey) and subsequently Det. Supt. Inman (Fulton Mackay). The episodes featuring Eden (the first nine of Series 1) were recorded in black-and-white, while all subsequent episodes were recorded on colour videotape.

The show was revamped in 1973 after Thames Television's Euston Films subsidiary took over production using film, which allowed for a less studio-based series. Euston Films had pioneered the technique of shooting action and adventure series entirely on location using 16 mm film, for a more gritty and realistic look. These episodes starred George Sewell as DCI Alan Craven and Roger Rowland as DS Bill North. In series 3 episode 2, Patrick Mower debuted as Craven's colleague and often antagonist, DCI Tom Haggerty. By the 1974 series Bill North had been axed, having had a nervous breakdown, though he returned for one episode later in the run as a Detective Inspector in CID.

Representing the Ministry in the first two series was Moxon, and later Strand, who appeared in the fourth series. Played by Morris Perry and Paul Eddington respectively, Moxon and Strand were similar: supercilious civil servants who kept an unwanted eye on the detectives and their budgets. They sometimes manipulated them in order to pursue obscure matters of state, such as in the first series episode "Reliable Sources", where Moxon connives to have Eden sidelined into a Home Office working party role.

The theme music for series 1 was by Norman Kay. For series 2, 3 and 4 it was by Robert Sharples under the pseudonym Robert Earley.

The 1973/74 series of this police drama is notable for being the first production by Euston Films, later responsible for such series as The Sweeney and Minder. The influence on The Sweeney is clear, although the rough-and-tumble nature of that show is fairly lacking in Special Branch.

Both Sewell and Mower later starred as villains in The Sweeney, while Sweeney star Dennis Waterman appeared in the 1974 Special Branch episode "Stand and Deliver" as a criminal. Perry appeared occasionally in a role similar to Moxon as the political and manipulative Detective Superintendent Maynon. Mower later went on to star in the 1977–78 BBC police series Target.

The 1973 and 1974 series have been released on Region Two DVD by Network, and both sets include an episode from the original Thames TV series. The 1969 series was released as a four-disc DVD set by Network in January 2007, and the 1970 series was released as a Website Exclusive in November 2007. All four series were released on DVD by Network in 2008, in a 16-disc box-set featuring all 53 episodes. The 1973 series was released on Region One DVD by Acorn, which labelled it "set one".

As with the later The Sweeney, the on-screen offices of Special Branch were located in Hammersmith.

== Filming locations ==
Multiple episodes of Special Branch used Ennismore Garden Mews, SW7, as a filming location.

== Cast ==
=== Derren Nesbitt era ===
- Derren Nesbitt as Detective Chief Inspector Elliot Jordan (27 episodes, 1969–1970)
- Wensley Pithey as Detective Superintendent Eden (9 episodes, 1969)
- Fulton Mackay as Detective Chief Superintendent Alec Inman (18 episodes, 1969–1970)
- Morris Perry as Charles Moxon (22 episodes, 1969–1970)
- David Garth as Deputy Commander (7 episodes, 1969–1970)
- Keith Washington as Detective Constable John Morrissey (15 episodes, 1969–1970)
- Sandra Bryant as Christine Morris (6 episodes, 1969–1970)
- Jennifer Wilson as Detective Sergeant Helen Webb (6 episodes, 1969)
- Anne Rutter as Detective Constable Jane Simpson (4 episodes, 1970)

=== George Sewell era ===
- George Sewell as Detective Chief Inspector Alan Craven (26 episodes, 1973–1974)
- Roger Rowland as Detective Sergeant Bill North (14 episodes, 1973–1974)
- Patrick Mower as Detective Chief Inspector Tom Haggerty (16 episodes, 1973–1974)
- Paul Eddington as Strand (11 episodes, 1974)
- Frederick Jaeger as Commander Fletcher (8 episodes, 1974)
- Sheila Scott Wilkinson as Sister Pam Sloane (7 episodes, 1973)
- Paul Antrim as Detective Sergeant Maguire (7 episodes, 1974)
- Richard Leech as Chief Superintendent Knight (5 episodes, 1973–1974)
- Susan Jameson as Detective Sergeant Mary Holmes (4 episodes, 1974)
- Peter Jeffrey as Chief Inspector Pettiford (1 episode, 1973)

=== Guest appearances ===
Notable actors appearing included: Paul Darrow ("Smokescreen"), Dino Shafeek and Windsor Davies ("The Promised Land"), Garfield Morgan and Rula Lenska ("Something About a Soldier"), Jacqueline Pearce ("Catherine the Great"), Cyd Hayman ("Rendezvous"), Susan Jameson as Detective Sergeant Mary Holmes ("Date of Birth", "Intercept", and "Downwind of Angels"), John Bindon ("Intercept"), Peter Bowles and Janet Key ("Downwind of Angels"), Nicolette McKenzie ("Diversion"), Denis Lill ("Diversion"), Kenneth Colley ("Date of Birth"), Valerie Leon ("Sounds Sinister") June Brown ("Entente Cordiale"), Annette Crosbie ("The Other Man"), Michael Gambon and Nadim Sawalha, ("Hostage"), Dennis Waterman and Stephanie Turner (as brother and sister in "Stand and Deliver"), Stephanie Beacham ("Threat"), Richard Marner ("Polonaise"), Roger Lloyd Pack ("Red Herring"), Gareth Thomas ("Alien"), Tony Haygarth ("You Won't Remember Me") and Walter Gotell ("Intercept").

== Reception ==
Special Branch was the most popular ITV show for the week of 27 September 1970 with 6.95 million viewing homes, ahead of Coronation Street and ITV News at Ten.

== Episodes ==
See series overview below.

== Series overview ==
| Series | Episodes | Originally released | |
| Series | Episodes | First released | Last released |
|---|---|---|---|
| 1 | 14 | 17 September 1969 | 17 December 1969 |
| 2 | 13 | 11 August 1970 | 4 November 1970 |
| 3 | 13 | 4 April 1973 | 4 July 1973 |
| 4 | 13 | 14 February 1974 | 9 May 1974 |

=== Series 1 (1969) ===
| Episode # | Title | Transmission Date | Writer | Director | Guest cast |
|---|---|---|---|---|---|
| 1 | Troika | 17 September 1969 | George Markstein | Mike Vardy | Sandra Bryant, Ivor Danvers, Roger Rowland, Donald Pelmear, John Livesey, Brian Ellis, Richard McNeff, Ray Barron |
| 2 | Smokescreen | 24 September 1969 | George Markstein | James Goddard | Sandra Bryant, Paul Darrow, John Dunbar, John Robinson, Edina Ronay, Donald Pelmear |
| 3 | The Promised Land | 1 October 1969 | Trevor Preston | Dennis Vance | Geoffrey Bayldon, Windsor Davies, Arnold Peters, Dino Shafeek, Martin Wyldeck, Mary Healey, George Lee, Arnold Diamond |
| 4 | A Date With Leonidas | 8 October 1969 | Scott Forbes | Dennis Vance | Brenda Cowling, Michael Harding, Joan Hooley, Kenneth Gilbert, Michael Keating, Damien Thomas, Robert Webber, Jon Croft |
| 5 | The Kazmirov Affair | 15 October 1969 | Emanuel Litvinoff | Mike Vardy | John Bailey, Edward Burnham, Ros Drinkwater, Patricia Lawrence, Gerald Sim, Ray Smith |
| 6 | A New Face | 22 October 1969 | Tom Brennand & Roy Bottomley | Peter Duguid | Tom Chadbon, John Levene, Doreen Mantle, Nicola Pagett, Tony Rohr, Anthony Sagar, Frances Tomelty, David Simeon |
| 7 | You Don't Exist | 29 October 1969 | Anthony Skene | Dennis Vance | Mel Martin, Harry Meacher, Clive Merrison |
| 8 | The Children of Delight | 5 November 1969 | Adele Rose | Peter Duguid | John Abineri, Tony Caunter, Sheila Fearn, Howard Goorney, Arnold Ridley, Heather Emmanuel |
| 9 | Reliable Sources | 12 November 1969 | Tom Brennand & Roy Bottomley | Dennis Vance | Tony Britton, David Collings, Norman Claridge |
| 10 | Short Change | 19 November 1969 | George Markstein | William G. Stewart | Sandra Bryant, Tommy Godfrey, Maurice Good, Peter Thornton |
| 11 | Exit a Diplomat | 26 November 1969 | C. Scott Forbes | Voytek | Hamilton Dyce, Cheryl Hall, Barbara Leigh-Hunt, Gary Watson, Donald Bisset, Hugh Morton, David Joyce, Billy Milton, George Pravda |
| 12 | Care of Her Majesty | 3 December 1969 | Robert Banks Stewart | Jonathan Alwyn | John Bryans, Angela East, John Franklyn-Robbins, Hilary Dwyer, Geoffrey Lumsden, Alec Ross |
| 13 | Visitor from Moscow | 10 December 1969 | Paul Wheeler | Dennis Vance | Alan Browning, Alan Haines, Ronald Magill, Claire Nielson, Jack Shepherd, Raymond Westwell |
| 14 | Time Bomb | 17 December 1969 | David Gordon | Voytek | Edward Atienza, Harold Kasket, Aubrey Richards, Mohammad Shamsi |

Note: Episodes 1-9 were made in black & white; episode 10 onwards were in colour

=== Series 2 (1970) ===
| Episode # | Title | Transmission Date | Writer | Director | Guest cast |
|---|---|---|---|---|---|
| 1 | Inside | 11 August 1970 | Trevor Preston | Guy Verney | Michael Goodliffe, Constantine Gregory, Kenneth Watson, Wendy Gifford, Haydn Jones, Michael Goldie, David Jackson |
| 2 | Dinner Date | 18 August 1970 | George Markstein | William G. Stewart | John Rolfe, Arnold Diamond, Arthur Cox, John Bailey, Frederick Jaeger, David Hargreaves |
| 3 | Depart in Peace | 25 August 1970 | Alun Falconer | Mike Vardy | David Langton, Bryan Marshall |
| 4 | Miss International | 1 September 1970 | Tom Brennand & Roy Bottomley | James Goddard | Jasmina Hilton, Marc Boyle, Richard McNeff |
| 5 | Warrant for a Phoenix | 8 September 1970 | Stewart Farrar | James Goddard | Paul Stassino, John Bennett, Stephen Greif, Clifford Rose |
| 6 | The Pleasure of Your Company | 16 September 1970 | George Markstein | William G. Stewart | Bruce Boa, Peter Arne, Derek Murcott |
| 7 | Not to Be Trusted | 23 September 1970 | Martin Worth | Guy Verney | William Lucas, Alethea Charlton, Emrys Jones, Ania Marson, Denis Goacher |
| 8 | Borderline Case | 30 September 1970 | Lewis Greifer | Tom Clegg | Richard Davies, Richard Durden, Tony Caunter, Leon Lissek, Georgina Simpson, Davyd Harries |
| 9 | Love from Doris | 7 October 1970 | C. Scott Forbes | John Russell | Alister Williamson, Mona Hammond, Hugh Futcher, John Woodnutt, James Marcus, Georgina Hale, Kevin Stoney, Dermot Tuohy, Ray Barron, Ken Barker |
| 10 | Sorry Is Just a Word | 14 October 1970 | Michael Chapman | James Goddard | Sheila Raynor, Gabrielle Drake, Sarah Thomas, James Cossins, Gary Watson, Robin Wentworth |
| 11 | Error of Judgement | 21 October 1970 | Peter Hill | Guy Verney | Basil Dignam, Robert Aldous, Gabrielle Blunt, Miranda Connell, Michael Lynch, Joseph O'Connell |
| 12 | Reported Missing | 28 October 1970 | Louis Marks | Dennis Vance | Nicola Pagett, Brian Wilde, Milos Kirek, Sheila Ruskin |
| 13 | Fool's Mate | 4 November 1970 | George Markstein | Dennis Vance | Sandra Bryant, Simon Lack, David Graham |

=== Series 3 (1973) ===
| Episode # | Title | Transmission Date | Writer | Director | Guest cast |
|---|---|---|---|---|---|
| 1 | A Copper Called Craven | 4 April 1973 | Roger Marshall | William Brayne | Peter Jeffrey, Tony Selby, Barry Jackson, Patrick Connor, Frank Jarvis |
| 2 | Round the Clock | 11 April 1973 | Tom Brennand & Roy Bottomley | Douglas Camfield | Patrick Fyffe, Maurice Quick |
| 3 | Inquisition | 18 April 1973 | Trevor Preston | Mike Vardy | Alan Downer, Keith Anderson, Clifford Rose, Clement McCallin |
| 4 | Assault | 25 April 1973 | Tom Brennand & Roy Bottomley | Douglas Camfield | Bob Keegan, Richard Vernon, Angus MacKay, Roger Avon, Rod Beacham, John Owens |
| 5 | Polonaise | 2 May 1973 | Allan Scott & Chris Bryant | Mike Vardy | Richard Marner, André Morell, George Pravda, David Weston, Bernard Archard, Michael Culver, Madeleine Christie, John Bailey, Milos Kirek |
| 6 | Red Herring | 9 May 1973 | Peter Hill | Mike Vardy | Norman Jones, Roger Lloyd Pack, Diana Quick, Linda Regan, Leslie Schofield, Leon Eagles, Trevor Martin, Charles Pemberton, John Abbott |
| 7 | Death by Drowning | 16 May 1973 | John Kershaw | Dennis Vance | Gwen Watford, Doreen Mantle, Bruce Montague, Drewe Henley, Dennis Chinnery |
| 8 | All the King's Men | 23 May 1973 | Trevor Preston | Dennis Vance | Geoffrey Bayldon, Ursula Howells, John Gregg, James Bree, Aubrey Richards, Paul Greenwood, Jenny McCracken, Deborah Brayshaw |
| 9 | Threat | 6 June 1973 | Tom Brennand & Roy Bottomley | William Brayne | Jack Hedley, Stephanie Beacham, Robert James, Keith Anderson |
| 10 | The Other Man | 13 June 1973 | Roger Marshall | Dennis Vance | Annette Crosbie, John Arnatt, Malcolm Terris, John Cazabon, Neal Arden, Seymour Green |
| 11 | You Won't Remember Me | 20 June 1973 | Anthony Skene | John Robbins | Michael Latimer, Mary Maude, Renee Houston, Tony Haygarth, Billy Milton, Tony Thawnton |
| 12 | Hostage | 27 June 1973 | John Kershaw | David Wickes | Ann Lynn, Michael Gambon, Mark Eden, Nadim Sawalha, Nigel Lambert, Elisabeth Sladen, Stacy Davies, Keith James, John Flint, Peter Laird |
| 13 | Blueprint for Murder | 4 July 1973 | Peter Hill & Ian Black | William Brayne | Kenneth Warren, William Modisane, Alex Scott, Louis Mahoney, Patrick McAlinney, Edward Jewesbury, Ronald Leigh-Hunt, Arne Gordon, Michael Godfrey |

=== Series 4 (1974) ===
| Episode # | Title | Transmission Date | Writer | Director | Guest cast |
|---|---|---|---|---|---|
| 1 | Double Exposure | 14 February 1974 | Michael J. Bird | Don Leaver | Gabriella Licudi, Stuart Wilson, Terence Bayler, Kenneth Watson, Ralph Watson, John Gill |
| 2 | Catherine the Great | 21 February 1974 | John Brason | Douglas Camfield | Jacqueline Pearce, Tony Beckley, Michael Sheard, Tommy Eytle, Neville Barber |
| 3 | Jailbait | 28 February 1974 | Michael Chapman | William Brayne | Paul Shelley, Clive Morton, Walter Sparrow, Fredric Abbott, Cyril Appleton, Olaf Pooley, Charles Morgan, Colette O'Neil, Stephen Greif, Arnold Peters, Jon Croft, Rod Beacham |
| 4 | Stand and Deliver | 7 March 1974 | Michael J. Bird | Tom Clegg | Ronald Radd, Dennis Waterman, Stephanie Turner, Christopher Benjamin, Edwin Apps, Charles Farrell |
| 5 | Something About a Soldier | 14 March 1974 | Michael J. Bird | William Brayne | Garfield Morgan, Godfrey James, Rula Lenska, Ivan Beavis, William Marlowe, Jack Lambert, Dave Carter |
| 6 | Rendezvous | 21 March 1974 | Tony Williamson | Terry Green | Cyd Hayman, Geoffrey Chater, Barbara Kellerman, Anthony Nicholls, David Webb, Richard Steele |
| 7 | Sounds Sinister | 28 March 1974 | David Butler | Terry Green | John Carson, Stanley Meadows, Claire Nielson, John Clive, Valerie Leon, Antony Webb, Vi Delmar, Peter Cleall |
| 8 | Entente Cordiale | 4 April 1974 | John Kershaw | William Brayne | George Murcell, Al Mancini, Peter Halliday, June Brown, Neil Hallett, Jonathan Adams, Richard Beale, William Marlowe, Alec Linstead, Charles Pemberton, Graeme Eton |
| 9 | Date of Birth | 11 April 1974 | Lewis Greifer | Don Leaver | Bruce Boa, Suzanne Roquette, Kenneth Colley, Richard Beale |
| 10 | Intercept | 18 April 1974 | Ian Kennedy Martin | William Brayne | Walter Gotell, Maxwell Shaw, Patrick Duggan, John Bindon, Peter Miles, Arnold Diamond |
| 11 | Alien | 25 April 1974 | Ray Jenkins | Douglas Camfield | Ann Firbank, Keith Buckley, Patrick Troughton, Gareth Thomas, Peter Cellier, Donald Eccles, Michael Guest |
| 12 | Diversion | 2 May 1974 | Peter J. Hammond | William Brayne | John Cairney, Denis Lill, Nicolette McKenzie, Keith Marsh |
| 13 | Downwind of Angels | 9 May 1974 | Peter Hill | Tom Clegg | Peter Bowles, Janet Key, Seretta Wilson, Peter Blythe, Vicki Hodge, Antony Carrick |
