= The Horse's Mouth =

1944 novel by Anglo-Irish writer Joyce Cary

- Cover of the first edition, published by Michael Joseph
- Author: Joyce Cary
- Language: English
- Publication date: 1944

The Horse's Mouth is a 1944 novel by Anglo-Irish writer Joyce Cary, the third in his First Trilogy, whose first two books are Herself Surprised (1941) and To Be a Pilgrim (1942).

Published on 28 August 1944, The Horse's Mouth follows the adventures of Gulley Jimson, an artist who would exploit his friends and acquaintances to earn money, told from his point of view, just as the other books in the First Trilogy tell events from their central characters' different points of view. Cary's novel also uses Gulley's perspective to comment on the social and political events of the time.

== Plot ==
Jimson's father, based on a real person known to Cary, was an Academy artist who is heart-broken when Impressionism drives his style from popular taste. Jimson has put aside any consideration of acceptance by either academy or public and paints in fits of creative ecstasy. Although his work is known to collectors and has become valuable, Jimson himself is forced to live from one scam or petty theft to the next. Cadging enough money to buy paints and supplies, he spends much of the novel seeking surfaces, such as walls, to serve as ground for his paintings.

When the novel opens, Jimson has just been released from jail. He seeks money from Hickson, his sometime patron. Later in the book, he tracks down Sara Monday, his ex-wife, and tries to obtain an early painting from her that is worth a great deal. Sara is reluctant to give up the picture, which serves as a reminder of her youth. In the struggle that follows, Sara falls and suffers a fatal injury. Jimson is unsentimental about his life and work and sees himself as someone who has given over to a destructive passion. Yet he regrets nothing.

At the novel's end, Jimson reflects on his life and the home and family that he has missed. But he recognizes that he himself made the decision to sacrifice those possibilities in order to pursue his art. It is only clear at the end that Jimson has suffered a paralysing stroke, and can no longer paint. As he is being taken to hospital, a nun who is nursing him remarks that he should be praying instead of laughing, "Same thing, Mother", replies Jimson, his last words.

== Adaptation ==
In 1958, a film adaptation, also titled The Horse's Mouth, was released, with an Academy Award-nominated screenplay by actor Alec Guinness. The film was directed by Ronald Neame, and starred Guinness, Kay Walsh, Renée Houston, Mike Morgan, and Robert Coote. It generally follows the book, except for deviating from the ending. It focuses on the Jimson character and what it means to be an artist, rather than the social and political themes. John Bratby painted the pictures attributed to Jimson in the film.

== Reviews ==
- Lardner, John (4 February 1950). "Art and Roguery by the Thames". The New Yorker. 25 (50): 88–90.

Philip Larkin described the book as "not superlative but managing to catch something of the indomitable soul of art. Really rather moving."
