= Veronica Turleigh =

Irish actress (1903–1971)

- Born: Bridget Veronica Turleigh; 14 January 1899; Castleforward Demesne, County Donegal, Ireland
- Died: 3 September 1971 (aged 72); Blackheath, London, England
- Occupation: Actor
- Spouse: James Laver

Veronica Turleigh (14 January 1899 – 3 September 1971) was an Irish actress.

== Biography ==
Bridget Veronica Turleigh was born on 14 January 1899 at Castleforward Demesne, County Donegal, Ireland. She attended the Catholic University in Dublin. Turleigh was the daughter of a member of the Royal Irish Constabulary, Martin Turley. She married James Laver, an expert on fashion and writer, in 1928. Laver and Turleigh had two children, Patrick M. and Bridget Cecilia Laver. Patrick Laver went on to become a British diplomat.

She was a member of the Oxford Playhouse in the 1920s. Turleigh acted alongside and was close friends with actors such as Alec Guinness and Robert Coote. She was proclaimed by Guinness as "one of the six nicest women I know." In 1939 she played Gertrude in Tyrone Guthrie's modern-dress and uncut Hamlet at The Old Vic with Alec Guinness in the title role. She appeared in the television series The Saint ("The Good Medicine", 1964) in a supporting role. Her final acting role on the screen was in The Root of All Evil? (1969).

Turleigh died on 3 September 1971, following a fall into a scalding bath at the couple's home, The Glebe, Blackheath, London. Guinness read at her funeral. She was cremated in London[12]. As her husband was involved in the collection of items related in theatre history and production, items associated with Turleigh's acting career are in the collections of the Victoria and Albert Museum.

== Partial filmography and playography ==
- The Agamemnon of Aeschylus
- Teresa of Avila
- King Arthur Was a Gentleman (1942) - (uncredited)
- The Card (1952) - Mrs. Machin
- The Horse's Mouth (1958) - Lady Beeder
- Theatre 625 (1964, Episode: "Women in Crisis My Grandmother") - Mrs. Wallace
- ITV Play of the Week (1965, TV Series) - Amelia Madras / Hecuba
- Knock on Any Door (1965, Episode: "Guests of Honour") - Ursula's Mother
- ITV Sunday Night Theatre (1969, Episode: "The Innocent Ceremony") - Mrs. Wingate
- The Root of All Evil? (1969, "Floating Man") - Mother (final appearance)
