= Jimmy Mac =

Jimmy Mac or Jimmy Mack may refer to:

- Jimmy Mac (actor) (1902–1984), British actor
- "Jimmy Mack", a 1967 song by Martha and the Vandellas
- Jimmy Mack (broadcaster) (1934–2004), Scottish television and radio presenter
- Jimmy McMillan (born 1946), American political activist
- James McNair (1952–2014), comedian "Uncle Jimmy Mack"
