= Christopher Wray (actor) =

English actor and businessman

- Born: Christopher John David Wray; 8 March 1940; Scarborough, North Riding of Yorkshire, England
- Died: 12 September 2014 (aged 74)
- Education: Italia Conti Academy of Theatre Arts
- Occupations: Actor and businessman
- Years active: 1957–2014
- Known for: Christopher Wray Lighting Emporium
- Television: Z-Cars (1962–1964); Doctor Who (1971–1972); Emmerdale (1972–1973)

Christopher John David Wray (8 March 1940 – 12 September 2014) was an English actor and businessman.

== Early life and education ==
He was born in Scarborough, North Yorkshire, North Riding of Yorkshire, and educated at Abingdon School in Abingdon-on-Thames, Oxfordshire, from 1951 to 1957. He was a keen actor at the school appearing in the School Productions, which included playing Bob Acres in The Rivals during 1956.

== Career ==
In the late 1950s he trained as an actor at the Italia Conti Academy of Theatre Arts in London and for the next few years found roles in British television productions such as Lowe in the episode "I Dies from Love" in Upstairs, Downstairs, Seaman Lovell and PC Groom in Doctor Who, PC Anderson in Z-Cars and PC Ball in Emmerdale.

During the actors' strike in the early 1960s he started selling old lamps in the Chelsea Antiques Market, and this developed into a lighting business with a shop on the King's Road in London known as the Christopher Wray Lighting Emporium. This became the flagship store of a business with around 20 shops in other towns and cities, including the Christopher Wray Lighting works in Birmingham.

The lighting business became so successful that he gave up on his acting career early in the 1970s following appearances in Emmerdale and The Adventures of Black Beauty in 1973.

== See also ==
- List of Old Abingdonians
