= The Horse's Mouth (film) =

1958 British film directed by Ronald Neame

- The Horse's Mouth US Theatrical Poster by Nicola Simbari
- Directed by: Ronald Neame
- Screenplay by: Alec Guinness
- Based on: The Horse's Mouth; 1944 novel by Joyce Cary
- Produced by: John Bryan; Ronald Neame
- Starring: Alec Guinness; Kay Walsh; Renée Houston; Mike Morgan; Robert Coote
- Cinematography: Arthur Ibbetson
- Edited by: Anne V. Coates
- Music by: Arranged and adapted from Sergei Prokofiev's Lieutenant Kijé by Kenneth V. Jones
- Distributed by: General Film Distributors
- Release date: 11 November 1958
- Running time: 97 minutes
- Country: United Kingdom
- Language: English
- Box office: $1 million (est. US/Canada rentals)

The Horse's Mouth is a 1958 British film directed by Ronald Neame and starring Alec Guinness, Kay Walsh and Renée Houston. The screenplay was by Alec Guinness based on the 1944 novel The Horse's Mouth by Joyce Cary. It was produced by John Bryan and Neame and filmed in Technicolor.

== Plot ==
Eccentric painter Gulley Jimson is released from a one-month jail sentence for telephone harassment of his sponsor, Mr. Hickson. Nosey Barbon, who wants to be Jimson's protégé, greets Jimson at HM Prison Wormwood Scrubs, but Jimson tries to discourage Nosey from pursuing painting for a living. Jimson goes to his houseboat, which his older lady friend Coker has been maintaining in his absence.

Jimson tries to borrow money from Hickson and Coker. Jimson and Coker later visit Hickson to secure payment for Jimson's artwork. Jimson tries to steal works back from Hickson's place, but Coker stops him. Hickson calls the police, but Jimson and Coker escape.

Jimson responds to a note from A.W. Alabaster, secretary to Sir William and Lady Beeder, who are interested in acquiring Jimson's early works. Jimson and Coker try to secure one of those works from Sara Monday, Jimson's ex-wife, but she turns them down.

When Jimson visits the Beeders, he sees a blank wall in their residence and is inspired to paint The Raising of Lazarus. He learns that the Beeders are leaving for six weeks and takes advantage of their absence to execute the painting. An old artistic rival, Abel, intrudes on Jimson to bring in a large block of marble to fulfil a sculpture commission for British Rail. Jimson pawns the Beeders' valuables, and Abel and Jimson accidentally destroy part of the Beeders' floor when the marble is dropped. After Jimson has completed the painting, the Beeders return. Shocked by the painting, they fall through the hole in the floor.

Jimson returns to his houseboat and finds Coker there. She was fired from her barmaid job after the press reported the incident at Hickson's residence. Later that evening, she surprises Jimson with the news that Hickson is dead and that he has bequeathed his collection of Jimson's works "to the nation." Those works are displayed at the Tate Gallery, which Jimson visits. In the long queue for the exhibit, Jimson sees Sara. He again attempts to regain the piece in her possession, and she gives him a roll tube. When he returns to the houseboat, Coker and Nosey find that the roll contains only toilet paper. Nosey follows Jimson to Sara's house, where Sara is knocked unconscious when Jimson grabs the painting.

Jimson and Nosey seek shelter in an abandoned church. Jimson is immediately inspired to execute his largest work, The Last Judgment, on a blank wall. Learning that the church is to be torn down within a fortnight, Jimson, Nosey and Coker recruit local youngsters to help complete the painting. A local council official overseeing the building's demolition objects to their activities. Jimson recruits Lady Beeder to participate. The painting is completed on the scheduled day of demolition. After the demolition crew warns everyone to stand back, Jimson suddenly drives a bulldozer through the wall, feeling it necessary to destroy the work before anyone else did. Jimson runs back to his boat and sets sail down the Thames before Nosey and Coker can stop him.

== Cast ==
- Alec Guinness as Gulley Jimson
- Kay Walsh as Miss D. Coker
- Renée Houston as Sara Monday
- Mike Morgan as Nosey
- Robert Coote as Sir William Beeder
- Arthur Macrae as A. W. Alabaster
- Veronica Turleigh as Lady Beeder
- Michael Gough as Abel [Bisson]
- Reginald Beckwith as Captain Jones
- Ernest Thesiger as Hickson
- Richard Caldicot as Roberts (Hickson's butler)
- Richard Leech as Hodges (porter in flats)
- John Kidd as pawnbroker
- Gillian Vaughan as Lollie

== Production ==
The film's Academy Award-nominated screenplay, written by Alec Guinness, generally follows the book upon which it was based. However, the screenplay focuses on Jimson's character and the life of an artist rather than on the social and political themes that the book explores. It also deviates from the book's ending, in which Jimson suffers a stroke and is no longer able to paint.

Alec Guinness sought funding from the Rank Organisation who refused to finance it. Guinness said John Davis, head of Rank, “told me that I was a funny man and if I ever made a serious film it would finish me off.” This led to Guinness no longer working for Rank.

The expressionistic paintings featured in the film are actually the work of John Bratby, a member of the English provincial realist artist group known as the kitchen sink school. To prepare for the film, Guinness observed Bratby at work in his home studio.

Mike Morgan fell ill with meningitis shortly before filming ended and died before its completion. As a result, another actor dubbed many of Morgan's lines.

Director Ronald Neame visited author Joyce Cary, who was dying from bone cancer. Cary requested that his son Tristram, who had previously scored Guinness' The Ladykillers, be contracted to write the film's score. Neame conveyed to Tristram Cary that he wanted "something jaunty and cocky" in the manner of Sergei Prokoviev's Lieutenant Kijé. The score was arranged by Kenneth V. Jones.

== Critical reception ==
The film, which received rave reviews in the UK after its Royal Command Performance, has been named by one critic as "[q]uite probably the best film ever made about a painter."

The Monthly Film Bulletin wrote: "Joyce Cary's novel, with its great central character, its comedy, passion and overflowing vitality, could not easily be confined within conventional screen limits. Alec Guinness, John Bryan and Ronald Neame are to be respected for what they have tried to do, but the essence of the novel eludes them. Guinness makes a brilliantly clever and consistent character study out of Gulley Jimson – rasping voice, shuffling little run, flashes of dignity and pathos alternating with the slapstick impudence. As Gulley the rogue he convinces, but as Gulley the artist something is missing. Kay Walsh and Renee Houston, as the square, defiant Coker and the yielding Sarah, are true to the novel's spirit. But several minor characters (the Beeders, the retired sailor who guards the houseboat) are taken too far towards caricature; and too many of Gulley's adventures have been translated into a sort of Ealing-style anarchism. Sometimes funny in their own right, though rather slackly directed by Ronald Neame, these scenes further weaken emphasis on the all-important fact that Gulley's story is that of creative force rather than lovable eccentricity. The picaresque ending – in the novel, Gulley is crushed when the wall falls on top of him – marks a further concession. The Horse's Mouth remains a brave venture; but beside the novel it looks very small."

Scott Weinberg of the Apollo Guide described Guinness' performance as "a devilishly enjoyable character study" that "ranges from 'mildly dishevelled' to 'tragically exhausted'" and also praised Neame's direction.

A contemporary Film Quarterly review by Henry Goodman identified the film's predominant theme of the artist as destroyer and praised the Gulley Jimson character as "a fine realization of the absurdities as well as the idealisms of the creative life."

== See also ==
- The Rebel
