= Sandra Bryant =

British television actress

- Born: 30 September 1945 (age 80); Edgware, Middlesex, England
- Occupations: Film actress television actress
- Years active: 1959–1980
- Known for: On the Buses; Coronation Street; The War Machines

Sandra Bryant (born 30 September 1945) is a British television actress. She is best known for her roles as Sandra in On the Buses and in Coronation Street as Dawn Digby.

== Filmography ==
=== Film ===
Year	Title	Role	Notes
1970	Wuthering Heights		
1971	She'll Follow You Anywhere	Sue	AKA, Passion Potion
1973	Holiday on the Buses	Sandra	

=== Television ===
Year	Title	Role	Notes
1962	Debbie Go Home	Janie de Villiers	TV short
1963	Suspense	Girl	"Walk in Fear"
1964	Z-Cars	Eunice Davison	"First Foot"
1966	Doctor Who	Kitty	"The War Machines: Parts 1 & 2"
1966	Emergency – Ward 10	Carole Hewitt	"1.935", "1.937"
1967	Emergency – Ward 10	Frankie Bowman	"A Cry for Help"
1967	Doctor Who	Chicki	"The Macra Terror: Episode 1"
1967	Mickey Dunne	Patsy	"The Tar Baby"
1967	Sat'day While Sunday	Rita	TV series
1968	Mr. Rose	Georgina Rae	"The Heralds of Death"
1968	Driveway	Julie Brock	"Meet the Major", "A Problem with Harry", "What About Yourself?"
1969	Her Majesty's Pleasure	Rita Smith	"This Can't Be Love"
1969	Love Story	Pamela Regan-Powell	"Ensign to the Cannon Proud"
1969	Coronation Street	Sandra	"1.872"
1969	Rogues' Gallery	Molly Socket	Main role
1969	ITV Sunday Night Theatre	Molly Socket	Main role (series 2)
1969	The Expert	Girl	"Do Not Go Gentle"
1969–70	Special Branch	Christine Morris	Recurring role (series 1–2)
1973	Whatever Happened to the Likely Lads?	Glenys	"I'll Never Forget Whatshername"
1973	On the Buses	Sandra	Recurring role (series 7)
1973	The Fenn Street Gang	Jackie / Natalie	"Is That a Proposal, Eric?", "Making Whoopee"
1974	Billy Liar	Linda	"Billy and the Matrimonial Stakes"
1975	Coronation Street	Dawn Digby	two episodes
1975	Not on Your Nellie	Mavis	"A-Haunting We Will Go"
1980	Breakaway	Rita Black	"The Local Affair: Parts 1 & 2"
