= Why Is Her Door Locked? =

- Upstairs, Downstairs episode
- Episode no.: Season 1 Episode 9
- Directed by: Brian Parker
- Written by: Alfred Shaughnessy
- Original air date: 6 February 1972

Guest appearances
- Michael Guest (The Milkman); Maggie Wells (Doris); Susan Porrett (Alice); Janie Booth (Lily Webber); Charlotte Simmonds (The stolen Baby Webber); David Strong (Arthur Webber); John Malcolm (Inspector Cape); Philip Lennard (The Magistrate); Bill Horsley (Perry); John Scott Martin (The Usher); William Gossling (Clerk of the Court); Ken Halliwell (Uniformed PC); Leonard Kingston (Magistrate's Clerk); Jimmy Mac (Magistrate); Bill Prentice (Solicitor); Charles Shaw Hesketh (Magistrate)

Episode chronology
← Previous "I Dies from Love"	Next → "A Voice from the Past"

"Why Is Her Door Locked?" is the ninth episode of the first series of the British television series, Upstairs, Downstairs. The episode is set in the summer of 1907.

"Why Is Her Door Locked?" was among the episodes omitted from Upstairs, Downstairs' initial Masterpiece Theatre broadcast in 1974, and was consequently not shown on US television until 1989.

== Plot ==
After Emily's suicide, Mrs. Bridges takes leave of her senses. She feels very guilty and remorseful over Emily's death. Having no one of her own to care for, she steals a baby from its pram outside a shop and hides it in her room, locking her door. Richard and Lady Marjorie return the baby to its parents, Lily and Arthur Webber, but rather than accepting an offer of financial compensation, the Webbers go to the police. Mrs. Bridges is arrested and put on trial. She escapes a jail sentence when Hudson agrees to marry her once they are no longer in service.

== Cast ==
Regular cast who appeared in this episode

- Gordon Jackson (Angus Hudson)
- Jean Marsh (Rose Buck)
- Rachel Gurney (Lady Marjorie Bellamy)
- David Langton (Richard Bellamy)
- Angela Baddeley (Mrs. Bridges)

Guest cast

- Michael Guest (The Milkman)
- Maggie Wells (Doris)
- Susan Porrett (Alice)
- Janie Booth (Lily Webber)
- David Strong (Arthur Webber)
- John Malcolm (Inspector Cape)
- Philip Lennard (The Magistrate)
- Bill Horsley (Perry)
- John Scott Martin (The Usher)
- William Gossling (Clerk of the Court)
- Ken Halliwell (Uniformed PC)
- Leonard Kingston (Magistrate's Clerk)
- Jimmy Mac (Magistrate)
- Bill Prentice (Solicitor)
- Charles Shaw Hesketh (Magistrate)
- Charlotte Simmonds (The stolen Baby Webber)
