= Cutthroat Island =

1995 film by Renny Harlin

- Theatrical release poster by Drew Struzan
- Directed by: Renny Harlin
- Screenplay by: Robert King; Marc Norman
- Story by: Michael Frost Beckner; James Gorman; Bruce A. Evans; Raynold Gideon
- Produced by: Renny Harlin; Laurence Mark; Joel B. Michaels; James Gorman
- Starring: Geena Davis; Matthew Modine; Frank Langella; Maury Chaykin; Patrick Malahide; Stan Shaw
- Cinematography: Peter Levy
- Edited by: Derek Brechin; Florent Retz; Frank J. Urioste; Ralph E. Winters
- Music by: John Debney
- Production companies: Carolco Pictures; Cutthroat Productions
- Distributed by: Metro-Goldwyn-Mayer (United States); AMLF (France)
- Release dates: December 22, 1995 (US); February 14, 1996 (France)
- Running time: 124 minutes
- Countries: United States; France
- Language: English
- Budget: $92–115 million
- Box office: $16 million

Cutthroat Island is a 1995 adventure swashbuckler film directed by Renny Harlin and written by Robert King and Marc Norman from a story by Michael Frost Beckner, James Gorman, Bruce A. Evans, and Raynold Gideon. It stars Geena Davis, Matthew Modine and Frank Langella. It is a co-production between the United States and France.

The film had a notoriously troubled and chaotic production involving multiple rewrites and recasts. Cutthroat Island was released by Metro-Goldwyn-Mayer in the United States on December 22, 1995, and by AMLF in France on February 14, 1996. Critical reactions were generally negative, and the film was one of the biggest box-office bombs in history, with losses of $147 million when adjusted for inflation. In April 2012, it was listed in the Guinness World Records as the biggest box-office bomb of all time, though it was surpassed in May of that same year by Disney's John Carter. Its failure caused Carolco Pictures to cease operations.

== Plot ==
In 1668 Jamaica, having escaped a trap set by authorities, Morgan Adams hunts down her paternal uncle and fellow pirate Douglas "Dawg" Brown after he kidnaps her father Black Harry. Harry has one of three pieces of a map to a huge stash of gold on the remote Cutthroat Island. Dawg has another piece, having stolen it after betraying and murdering their younger brother Richard, while a fourth brother, Mordachai, has the last piece. Refusing to give his piece to Dawg, Harry escapes with Morgan's help. Harry is fatally wounded and tells Morgan the map piece is located on his scalp before he dies.

After scalping Harry for the piece, Morgan, now captain of Harry's ship, the Morning Star, sets out to find the treasure. Unable to translate the map, they go to nearby Port Royal for a translator. There, they learn that a criminal being sold into slavery, a con man and thief named William Shaw, is fluent in Latin. After threatening Toussant, a man determined to outbid her, Morgan wins the auction. When she is recognized from her wanted poster and barely escapes with her crew and Shaw, corrupt Governor Ainslee vows to find her after learning of the treasure's existence. He enlists the help of John Reed, an infamous chronicler of pirates and crew member of the Morning Star.

The crew finds Mordachai in Spittlefield Harbor. Before they can learn where the second piece is, Dawg and his crew raid the harbor. A fight ensues, during which Mordachai is killed and Morgan is shot, while Shaw secretly finds the piece and keeps it to himself. After they escape on the Morning Star, Morgan collapses from her wound, but Shaw uses his limited medical knowledge to save her. The two start a romance. Morgan figures out that the words on the two map pieces, when read backwards, spell out half the coordinates to the island.

Dawg pursues the Morning Star in his own ship, the Reaper. Morgan directs hers toward a coral reef and a gale to shake her pursuers off. Shaw manages to piece together the location of Cutthroat Island with his and Morgan's piece but is caught and thrown in the brig. During the storm, Reed secretly sends a carrier pigeon revealing their location to Ainslee. Meanwhile, most of the crew, led by the treacherous boatswain Scully, mutinies and maroons Morgan and those loyal to her in a boat. The tide takes them straight to Cutthroat Island.

As Morgan goes after the treasure, Shaw steals the last map piece from Dawg. Shaw falls into quicksand and Morgan, realizing he has the piece, frees him. Together they find the treasure, only for it to be stolen by Dawg, forcing them to jump off a cliff into the tide. After regaining consciousness, Shaw finds Reed, who leads him into a trap set by Dawg, Ainslee, and Scully, who have joined forces and intend to split the treasure. As Shaw is captured and they make their way out to sea with the gold, Morgan sneaks aboard the Morning Star and retakes it from Scully and the mutineers.

The crew then tries to sneak attack the Reaper, but Dawg counterattacks. A sea fight ensues, during which Shaw escapes and Ainslee, his men, and Reed are killed by cannon fire. Morgan boards the Reaper and blows out the ship's bottom. She then duels Dawg while Shaw gets trapped below in rapidly rising water with the treasure. Morgan kills Dawg with a cannon and saves Shaw, forced to abandon the treasure to escape the sinking ship.

Morgan had attached a marker barrel to the treasure beforehand, allowing them to retrieve it, and the newly rich crew sets sail for Madagascar.

== Cast ==
- Geena Davis as Morgan Adams
- Matthew Modine as William Shaw
- Frank Langella as Douglas "Dawg" Brown
- Maury Chaykin as John Reed
- Patrick Malahide as Ainslee
- Stan Shaw as Glasspoole
- Rex Linn as Mr. Blair
- Paul Dillon as Snelgrave
- Chris Masterson as Bowen
- Jimmie F. Skaggs as Tom Scully
- Harris Yulin as "Black" Harry Adams
- Angus Wright as Captain Trotter
- Ken Bones as Toussant
- Mary Peach as Lady
- Roger Booth as Auctioneer
- George Murcell as Mordachai "Fingers" Adams
- Richard Leaf as Snake
- Rupert Vansittart as Captain Perkins
- David Bailie as Pirate
- Ramon Tikaram as Pirate
- Christopher Adamson as Pirate
- Renny Harlin as Pirate (uncredited)

== Production ==
=== Development ===
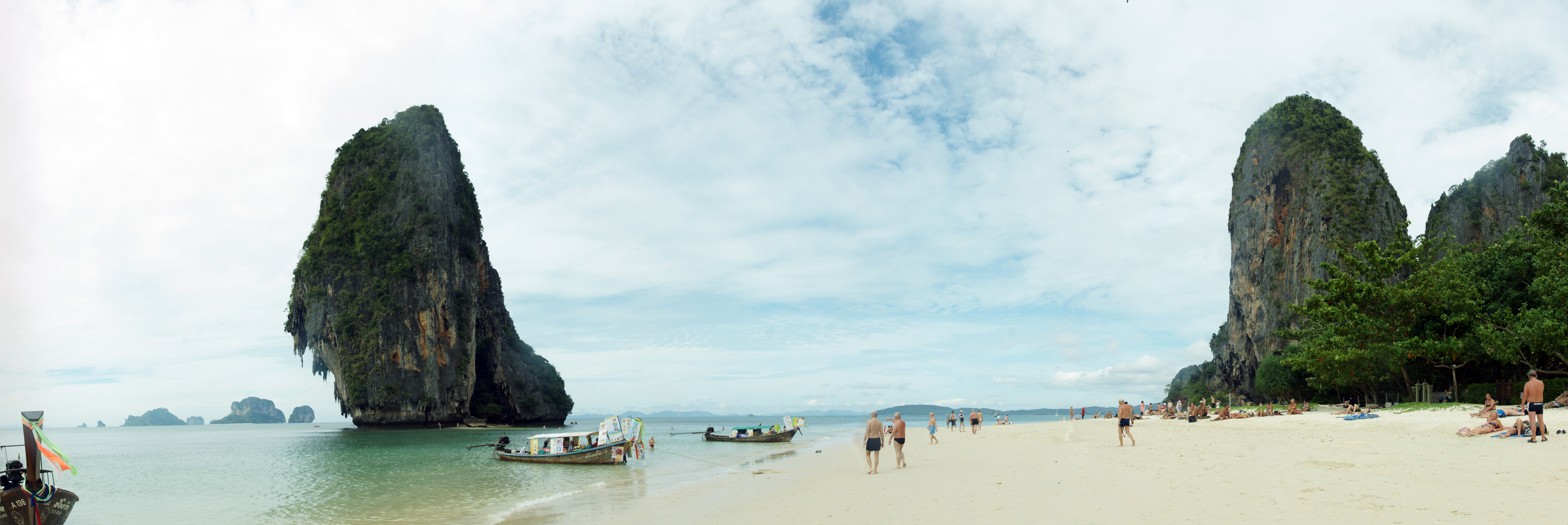
Phra Nang beach was one of the shooting locations.

In a 2023 interview, original writers James Gorman and Michael Frost Beckner explained they had a development deal with Disney, after their Western spec script Texas Lead and Gold had created buzz in the early 1990s. Any material they created, they let Disney see first: one of them was a pirate script. Inspired by researching archives of pirate material at the Huntington Library, as well as the success of buddy action films, the pair sought to modernize the pirate genre. Among the differences from the later versions were the island being volcanic and more secret, and a backstory involving four men (including Spanish and British officers) sacking a gold shipment and hiding the treasure before being betrayed. The script would jump ahead in time, with the men now in different social positions (like the Spaniard being the Governor of Portobello) and William Shaw, a more ruthless character in this version, learning of the existence of the treasure. The villain was the mysterious "The Scar", hunting the men down for the map pieces. Morgan Adams was also different, being the innocent daughter of the village doctor Harry (the British privateer of the four men) who becomes embroiled in the adventure. Instead of being tattooed on his scalp, Harry would hide his map piece in a lullaby that he sang to Morgan as a child.

Gorman and Frost Beckner's version, while still an adventure with comic elements, was also much darker than the finished film. Disney development staff backed the project. At one point it was even pitched to Michael Eisner as a potential Pirates of the Caribbean film, who turned it down. Gorman and Frost Beckner then presented it to Carolco Pictures, who bought it for $1.7 million.

In a 2011 radio interview with director Renny Harlin, Carolco Pictures was in debt and financial distress during development and prior to the beginning of filming, but they had to make the film, since financing from foreign investors was already in place. The studio initially budgeted $60 million for Cutthroat Island and pinned its hopes for survival on its success. To fund the project, the studio cancelled its only other film in development, Crusade, starring Arnold Schwarzenegger, costing it $13 million. Carolco also sold a $20 million interest in Paul Verhoeven's Showgirls, Last of the Dogmen and Stargate, and aggressively marketed Cutthroat Island to overseas distributors, promising them it would be a sure hit.

=== Casting ===
At the time the film was in development, Renny Harlin was married with Geena Davis, and he convinced producer Mario Kassar to cast Davis, who was by then known for light comedies, hoping it would turn her into an action-adventure star. Michael Douglas originally agreed to play Shaw under two conditions: filming had to start immediately because he was available only for a limited time, and his character had to have the same amount of screen time as Davis. Douglas eventually pulled out, claiming that Davis's role as Morgan was expanded at his character's expense, while Davis wanted to quit when Douglas did, but was contractually obligated to finish the film.

After Douglas quit, Harlin was so preoccupied with trying to find a male lead that set construction and script work were done without his input. Consequently, Harlin did not like what he saw when shooting was set to begin, leading to expensive rebuilding and rewriting. Tom Cruise, Keanu Reeves, Russell Crowe, Liam Neeson, Jeff Bridges, Ralph Fiennes, Charlie Sheen, Michael Keaton, Tim Robbins, Daniel Day-Lewis and Gabriel Byrne all turned down the role of Shaw before Matthew Modine agreed to do the role, partly due to his experience as a fencer.

Oliver Reed was originally cast for a cameo as Mordechai Fingers, but was fired after getting in a bar fight and attempting to expose himself to Davis while intoxicated. George Murcell eventually took his place.

=== Filming ===
Shooting was delayed for various reasons, causing the budget to spiral out of control. When Harlin fired chief camera operator Nicola Pecorini following a dispute, more than two dozen crew members quit. In addition, broken pipes caused raw sewage to pour into the water tank where the actors were supposed to swim. Harlin spent $1 million of his own money to rewrite the script, as Carolco Pictures was in so much debt that they could not afford to pay further.

The first week into production, the film's original cinematographer, Oliver Wood, fell off a crane and into one of the water tanks, breaking his leg; he had to be replaced by cinematographer Peter Levy. Wood's contributions to the film would be acknowledged in the closing credits.

The film was shot on location in Malta and Thailand. Indoor scenes were shot at Mediterranean Film Studios in Kalkara, Malta, and models were shot at the Paddock Tank at Pinewood Studios, in Iver Heath, Buckinghamshire, England. Harlin required actors to do their own stunts whenever possible. While promoting the film, Davis appeared on talk shows with clips of her doing stunts over and over (including one take where she fell out of a window too soon, rolled down the roof and under a carriage) and described the bruises and injuries she sustained while filming.

In an interview with Matthew Modine, he explained some of the major factors contributing to the film's production cost overruns: Harlin's cost-prohibitive habit of always having three cameras rolling at the same time; and Harlin and Davis spending large sums to have cases of V8 vegetable juice shipped out to the set in Malta for themselves. Towards the end of filming, an entire room was found to be full of unopened juice, and everyone present was obliged to drink it.

=== Music ===
The film's orchestral score was composed by John Debney. It is one of the film's aspects that has been critically acclaimed, compared with the classic works of Erich Wolfgang Korngold.

== Release and reception ==
=== Box office ===
Cutthroat Island had a total production budget of $92–98 million (though some put the figure as high as $115 million). Metro-Goldwyn-Mayer (MGM) distributed the film in the United States, but since they were in the process of being sold at the time, MGM was unable to devote themselves into financing a marketing campaign for the film. Cutthroat Island debuted at number 13 at the US box office, and the total gross in the United States and Canada was only $10 million. Internationally, it did not fare any better and grossed $6 million, for a worldwide total of $16 million. In Spain, by the end of 1996, it had sold 685,184 admissions, for a total of 357 million pesetas ($2.83 million at the average exchange rate of that year). In France, it sold 250109 admissions, for an unspecified revenue. In 2014, the Los Angeles Times listed the film as one of the most expensive box office flops of all time, while the Guinness World Records listed it as the biggest box-office bomb of all-time. It is no better (ranges vary) than the fifth worst money loser of all time, allowing for inflation, as of 2023 (see list of biggest box-office bombs).

=== Critical response ===
On Rotten Tomatoes, Cutthroat Island has an approval rating of 40% based on 42 reviews, with an average rating of 4.9/10. The site's critics consensus reads: "Cutthroat Island may aspire towards the earnest thrills of classic swashbucklers, but a distinct lack of charm and stilted script make this adventure a joyless hodgepodge of the pirate genre's flotsam and jetsam." On Metacritic the film has a score of 37 out of 100 based on 20 critics, indicating "generally unfavorable" reviews. Audiences surveyed by CinemaScore gave the film a grade "B−" on an A+ to F scale.

Todd McCarthy from Variety said: "What seemed like a dubious proposition on paper plays even more dubiously onscreen, as Cutthroat Island strenuously but vainly attempts to revive the thrills of old-fashioned pirate pictures. Giving most of the swashbuckling opportunities to star Geena Davis, pic does little with its reversal of gender expectations and features a seriously mismatched romantic duo in Davis and Matthew Modine." Time Out London commented that "we get Geena Davis doing the all-action honours, and a hotchpotch script that seems to think pirate movies are so funny in themselves the need for more humour is superfluous. The plot's well worn". Janet Maslin of The New York Times said that "It's not possible to believe that Ms. Davis is the highly respected captain of a pirate ship, and it's not even fun to try." Empire gave the film two stars out of five, stating, "It's mindless entertainment, but its critical and commercial failure doomed the pirate genre to a watery grave," while complimenting the locations and the set pieces: "The film is at its best in the gorgeous locations and the huge (we're talking Harlin - Die Hard 2, Cliffhanger - huge) set-pieces, concluding in a wild sea battle that is more John Woo on water".

Roger Ebert of the Chicago Sun-Times gave the film a three-out-of-four-star rating, commenting: "This is, in short, a satisfactory movie – but it doesn't transcend its genre, and it's not surprising or astonishing. I saw it because that was my job and, having seen it, I grant its skill, and award it three stars on that basis. But unless you're really into pirate movies, it's not a necessary film." Susan Wloszczyna from USA Today stated: "If the sight of half-naked, tattooed sailors firing cannons at each other shivers your timbers, climb aboard. Even passable pirate movies don't sail by every day," awarding the film 2.5 stars out of 4.

Harlin was nominated for a Golden Raspberry Award for Worst Director for his work on the film, but "lost" to Paul Verhoeven for Showgirls at the 16th Golden Raspberry Awards.

== Legacy ==
The failure of Cutthroat Island is credited as the final major blow for Carolco Pictures, as their obligation to make the film and hopes for its success contributed to their losses, and they filed for Chapter 11 bankruptcy a month prior to its release. The failure is also credited with significantly reducing the bankability of pirate-themed films, which recovered only with the production and release of Walt Disney Pictures' Pirates of the Caribbean: The Curse of the Black Pearl in 2003.

Scott Mendelson of Forbes stated on the film's 25th anniversary that the film, along with the similar box office disappointment of Aeon Flux nearly ten years later, contributed to the industry's move away from producing films with female leads before and during the 21st century, under the assumption that mainstream audiences were not interested in such films.

== Video game ==
A video game was published by Acclaim Entertainment and released for the major platforms of the time (such as the Super NES, Sega Genesis and Game Boy) to tie in with the film. It loosely follows the events of the film.

== See also ==
Other pirate-themed box office bombs:

- The Pirate Movie (1982)
- Yellowbeard (1983)
- Nate and Hayes (1983)
- Pirates (1986)

== Bibliography ==
- Parish, James Robert (2006). Fiasco - A History of Hollywood's Iconic Flops. Hoboken, New Jersey: John Wiley & Sons. pp. 359 pages. ISBN 978-0-471-69159-4.
- Prince, Stephen (2000). A New Pot of Gold: Hollywood Under the Electronic Rainbow, 1980–1989. Berkeley/Los Angeles, California: University of California Press. ISBN 0-520-23266-6.
