= Rogues' Gallery (TV series) =

British television series (1968–1969)

- Genre: Period drama
- Directed by: Michael Cox; Richard Everitt
- Starring: Diane Cilento; Jim Dale; Sandra Bryant
- No. of seasons: 2
- No. of episodes: 10

Production
- Producer: Peter Wildeblood
- Running time: 55 minutes
- Production company: Granada Television

Original release
- Network: ITV
- Release: 5 February 1968 – 9 June 1969

Rogues' Gallery is a British television series produced by Granada Television, which first aired on ITV between 1968 and 1969, as a self contained six episode story within season one of the ITV Sunday Night Theatre anthology series. It was set around London's Newgate Prison in the 18th century.

== Main cast ==
- Diane Cilento as Lady Sarah Bellasize
- Jim Dale as Lucifer Kane
- John Woodnutt as Doctor Peppercorn
- Sandra Bryant as Molly Socket
- Michael Balfour as Tom Meatyard
- Ann Tirard as Old Bessie
- Danny Sewell as Gideon the Gaoler
