= Roger Rowland =

British television actor

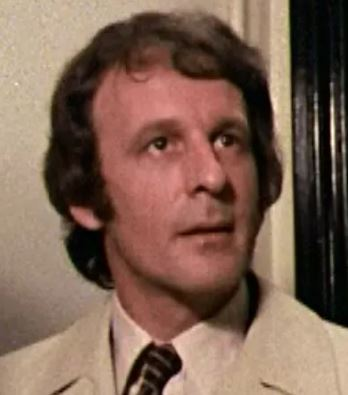
Roger Rowland

Roger Rowland (1 April 1935 – 14 January 2011) was a British TV actor predominantly working in the 1970s and 1980s. He made quite a number of UK television appearances, including some well-remembered series (though none were starring roles). His best-known role was Sergeant North through the 1973 series of Special Branch. He was once married to the actress Anne Stallybrass.

Rowland was born in York, England, on 1 April 1935. He died on 14 January 2011, aged 75.

== Television work ==
On television, Rowland's career began with small roles, sometimes uncredited appearances. He had small parts in early episodes of anthology series, such as Granada Television's ITV Play Of The Week, the ABC (Associated British Corporation) Television's Armchair Theatre strand, and later in ITV's Play Of The Week and Saturday night Theatre. He also made a number of appearances in the BBC's Play For Today strand.

Rowland also made an appearance in the significant 1958 BBC production of Quatermass and the Pit as a journalist and appeared as Frank Hoyle in a number of episodes of Coronation Street. His appearance in Probation Officer as 'First Policeman' presaged a number of roles Rowland would be given as a policeman of varying levels of seniority over the coming years.

Rowland met the actress Anne Stallybrass in Nottingham and they married in 1963. He continued making TV appearances over the years in such series as Z-Cars, Softly Softly and it's follow-up, Softly Softly Task Force, It's Dark Outside, The Villains, Orlando, Object Z, Frontier, Sexton Blake, The Mind of Mr. J.G. Reeder, and Paul Temple. He also appeared in comedies such as The Worker and The Dustbinmen. Anne Stallybrass was unable to have children. Though this was something she learned to live with, the couple later divorced in 1972.

== Special Branch ==
Thames Television premiered Special Branch in September 1969, with the episode "Troika". Rowland played the part of Det. Chief Insp. Felding, an incidental character in the plot. When Special Branch was revamped for a third series to be made by Euston Films in 1973, Rowland came on board as Sergeant Bill North, sidekick to Inspector Craven (played by George Sewell). The mix of Craven's working-class character with the rather more upper-class North made for some infrequent minor class commentary, though they forged a strong and respectful working relationship. North would tend to be overshadowed in S3 episodes where Patrick Mower made guest appearances as Craven's recently promoted equivalent, Detective-Inspector Haggerty.

Mower joined Special Branch as full-time co-star for Series 4, with DCI Haggerty and Craven developing a more antagonistic partnership which was of more interest to the viewer. (This dynamic would be carried on with the Regan-Carter relationship in Special Branch's successor, The Sweeney.) To make way for Haggerty, the character of North became subject to a mental breakdown as series 3 drew to a close and would leave Special Branch.

There would be one final appearance for the character in series 4, episode 2 "Catherine The Great", where Craven ad Haggerty are on the hunt for an assassin. North - now promoted to a Detective Inspector in CID - is canvassed for assistance.

== Further television work ==
Other appearances around this period included well-known series such as A Family At War, Man At The Top, Hine, Emmerdale Farm, The Edwardians and Strangers.

In the 1974 Kenneth More detective series Father Brown, Rowland played Carstairs K.C. in episode 6, "The Mirror of the Magistrate".

He appeared in very few films, the most famous of which would be the comedy-horror film, An American Werewolf In London, where he played the role of a policeman.

Rowland played Exton Waite MP in the opening episode of Floodtide (1987), written by Roger Marshall. Exton's death in episode 1 (titled "The Call") dies from a heart attack supposedly brought on after taking cocaine, which opens up the rest of the thriller.

Perhaps a mark of Rowland's sometime ability of playing forgettable characters, was by being given two separate minor roles in 1986's First Among Equals. In episode 6 he played Robin Oakley, while later in episode 9 he appeared as the Chairman of the 1922 Committee.

Other small roles were in Auf Wiedersehen, Pet series 2, Boon, The Return Of Sherlock Holmes, The Monocled Mutineer.

In 1989, Rowland appeared in Tales of Sherwood Forest Episode 4, as Detective Sergeant Renwick.

His last-known credit was in the Canadian series Traders.

== Death ==
Rowland died in Toronto on 14 January 2011, aged 75. He was survived by his wife Elspeth Alexandra Carling, whom he had married in 1983.
