= Frontier (1968 TV series) =

Frontier is a 1968 UK television series that was made for Thames Television. Set in India's northwest frontier during the Victorian era, the series was written by Anthony Skene. At the time of its premiere, it was the most expensive television series made in the United Kingdom. Produced by Michael Chapman and directed by Dennis Vance, the series ran for only one season with a total of 8 episodes from Jul 31, 1968 through September 18, 1968. Many of the scenes were filmed at the Royal Military Academy Sandhurst. Most editions of this series are considered lost.

== Main cast ==
- Gary Bond as Lieutenant Clive Russell
- Paul Eddington as Hamilton Lovelace
- James Maxwell as Captain Stoughton
- Patrick O'Connell as Colour Sergeant O'Brien
- John Phillips as Lieutenant Colonel Whitley
- Roger Rowland as Sergeant Peters
- Fulton Mackay as Captain Moncrieff
- Peter Jeffrey as Captain Rankin-Keogh
- Paul Darrow as Captain Hume
- Peter Barkworth as Mortimer Berkley
