= Augusta Fullam =

- Born: Augusta Fairfield Goodwyn; 23 June 1875; Calcutta, India
- Died: 28 May 1914 (aged 38); Naini Prison, Allahabad
- Known for: Double murderer
- Spouse: Lieutenant Edward Fullam
- Partner: Henry Lovell William Clark
- Children: 4

Augusta Fairfield Fullam (1875 – 1914) was a British Raj woman implicated in a double murder in Agra in India. Fullam was born in Calcutta in 1875 and died in Allahabad in 1914. She was the wife of Lieutenant Edward McKeon Fullam and lived in Calcutta, Barrackpore, Meerut and finally Agra (India). She came to notice when she was interviewed in connection with Dr Henry Clark whose wife had been hacked to death on 17 November 1912. She and Clark had been lovers since 1909, and some 400 letters Augusta had written, swiftly discovered by the police, provided unarguable evidence of conspiracy to murder their respective spouses. On 11 October 1912, days after the Fullams moved to Agra, Edward Fullam had died, supposedly of heatstroke and “general paralysis of insanity” (tertiary syphilis), but as later post mortem revealed, of arsenic poisoning., The definitive account of Augusta Fullam's life and the double murder of which she and her lover were convicted is Molly Whittington-Egan's Khaki Mischief (1990)

== Early life and marriage ==
According to the definitive account of her life and crime, Molly Whittington-Egan's Khaki Mischief (1990), she was born Augusta Fairfield Goodwyn in Calcutta on 23 June 1875, baptised 12 August 1875 at the Methodist Episcopal Church Calcutta, and educated in a convent, possibly Loreto House, but no school records with her name have been found. The daughter of English-born Leonard Goodwyn, a Bengal River Pilot, Augusta had a sister, Dora, and a half-sister Catherine Burridge by her mother's previous marriage to a musical instrument dealer. There is no evidence that Augusta ever left India or was in England, a confusion possibly arising from the sensitive term 'Anglo-Indian', used variously in the British Raj to define Europeans born in India and as a politer alternative to 'Eurasian' for those of mixed race.

Whittington-Egan describes Augusta as "short and dumpy... vivacious and quite attractive... small, sociable, mischievous" with a "china-doll complexion" and "springy brown tresses", definitely not "a sultry siren or slinky femme fatale". On 17 June 1896 at Barrackpore, 15 miles from Calcutta, Augusta married Edward McKeon Fullam (born 1867), a rising clerk in the Indian Civil Service, whose career peaked as Deputy Examiner in the Military Accounts Department at Meerut. He was eight years older than Augusta, with a withered arm and health susceptible to the fierce climate and temperature. A Freemason, Sunday School teacher and 2nd Lieutenant in the local volunteers, "Eddie" or "hubby" (as "Gussie" called him) was perhaps a bit of a dull stick for a flirtatious, party-loving woman who enjoyed cheap romantic novels, male attention, gossip, parties and fun.

Gussie and Eddie settled down to a comfortable life on cantonments, first at Barrackpore, then from 1908 at Meerut (North of Delhi). The Fullams only moved to Agra in 1911 when Eddie's health was succumbing to the poisoning campaign that killed him soon after their arrival. Meanwhile, they had three children: Leonard (born 1899), Kathleen (born 1902) and Frank (born 1906).

== Affair with Henry Clark and murder of Edward Fullam ==
Augusta had met Henry Lovell Clark at a dance sometime in 1908, and it was at her urging that Edward Fullam invited his fellow-Mason Clark to their home in Meerut, where Clark and Augusta soon began a fully-blown affair. Clark was a raffish figure with a definite reputation. Born at Calcutta in 1868, the son of an indigo-planter, Henry was Eurasian and therefore a definite social cut below the Fullams, in the rigid hierarchy of British Raj India and the Indian caste system). He was handsome, muscular and a dedicated womaniser, despite his 1889 marriage to a former nurse, Louisa Guest, ten years older than himself, by whom he had three children: Maud, Henry and Walter. The sons were grown up when their father met Augusta, and working in the Military Accounts Department at Meerut, where Edward Fullam was deputy head. Maud was a teenager, living at home with her mother, while Clark, who regularly beat and abused his wife and children, "played the field". Clark was a medical officer in the Indian Sobordinate Medical Department: a vague status somewhere short of a fully-qualified General Practitioner. Clark had struggled to pass the examinations, but was said to have achieved his army lieutenancy serving as an assistant surgeon in the British Indian Army during the 1900 Boxer Uprising in China.

Whittington-Egan describes Henry Clark as "active, restless... raffish... Versatile and bazaar-wise, he would slide off from a polite game of tennis to frequent risky native prostitutes in their questionable hovels... A bad lot... [a] brutish creature caged inside a front of gallantry...Basically he was a loser. It is surprising that a man of such known bad character ever obtained preferment at all. His undoubted success with women fuelled a self-esteem that would otherwise have faltered." Augusta couldn't get enough of him. Their affair became increasingly indiscreet, and while Edward Fullam seems not to have cottoned on - he and Augusta had a fourth child, Myrtle, in January 1910 - Meerut was rife with gossip and in November 1910, Clark was transferred to Delhi, 45 miles from Meerut, after which, Augusta started writing him increasingly indiscreet letters, most of which he unwisely kept: 400 or so of these letters would play a crucial part in securing convictions against the couple for the murder of their respective spouses. Clark was later transferred again to Agra, 180 miles from Meerut, and there was some idea of his seniors' posting him to Aden, out of India altogether.

In Spring 1911, Augusta was pregnant by Clark, who gave her abortifacient drugs to procure a miscarriage, and on a visit to Meerut, the lovers' indiscreet behaviour finally alerted Edward Fullam to suspicion and jealousy. From now on the lovers' conspired to poison their respective partners, passing off the deaths as heatstroke or other common illnesses. Augusta started lacing Edward's food and drink with arsenic and other poisons posted to her by Clark, while he in turn tried to bribe the family cook Bibu to poison Louisa's food. The horrified cook went straight to Louisa, who enlisted her children's support and had the powders analysed (by a subordinate of her husband's at the hospital): arsenic. The cook fled back home, and Clark hired a new cook Budhu, whom he suborned to help him dispose of Louisa, who was now on the alert, fully aware of his intentions. Poisoning was beginning to look problematic as a means of killing Louisa.

Meanwhile, in Meerut, although the steady campaign of poisoning Edward Fullam was ruining his health, it was not finishing him off, as planned, and he was ruled unfit for work, to be pensioned off and possibly sent to a more salubrious part of India ('The Hills' or Bangalore), or even to England, where neither he nor Augusta had any real roots or connections. In October 1911, Edward was discharged from hospital and moved with his wife and family to a new home in, of all places, Agra, a short distance from Clark's bungalow. Three days later, he was dead, finished off by three injections given by Clark and witnessed by young Kathleen Fullam. He was buried in haste, and Clark soon became the Fullams' man of the house, eating most of his meals and sleeping there... and beating the Fullam children, as he had his own.

== Murder of Louisa Clark, trial and conviction ==
The lovers now turned their attention to removing Henry Clark's unwanted wife Louisa, for which Clark engaged the family cook Budhu to recruit 'badmashes' (amateur criminals with daytime jobs in the local bazaars) to attack and murder Louisa as she slept in the Clark's bungalow, in what was to look like a disturbed robbery. On 17 November 1912, while Clark was cycling around Agra, establishing an alibi that would swiftly unravel on police inspection, the four hired badmashes, Sukkha, Buddha, Ram Lal and Mohan (all in their early twenties), joined by a hesitantly supervising Budhu, stole into the Clark bungalow as the ladies slept, and hacked Louisa to death in front of her daughter Maud. Clark had ruined his flimsy alibi by cycling home to lock up the dog, which was barking and preventing the assassins from entering the house, and to stop by at Augusta's. The lovers compromised themselves further by paying the killers with rupees from a cheque of Augusta's which Clark countersigned at the bank... and when police found Augusta's letters in a locked tin chest under her bed, left there "for safety" by Clark, the game was up.

Edward Fullam's body was exhumed and arsenic found in the remains. Henry Clark and Augusta Fullam were arrested, and after December 1912 - January 1913 committal proceedings in the Agra Magistrates' Court, charged and sent for trial on both murders, along with the five co-conspirators, at the High Court of Justice in Allahabad (then state capital of the United Provinces of Agra & Oudh, now Uttar Pradesh). Augusta submitted a December 1912 statement, seeking to exonerate herself and attribute her letters and actions to hypnosis by Clark, but this cut little ice, and came close to a confession of her role in both murders. She later applied to the High Court to be accepted as "approver" (the equivalent of English Law's "turning King's Evidence") in the case, but this was rejected, as the canny cook Budhu had already been accepted "approver", and earned indemnity from charge or penalty by giving evidence against the others. The authorities could feel comfortable convicting Augusta, safe in the knowledge that, being pregnant with Clark's child, she would be reprieved the mandatory death sentence.

The High Court trial opened on 26 February 1913 gathering international attention. Fullam had applied to give King's Evidence but her application was rejected. Both Maud Clark and Kathleen Fullam were key prosecution witnesses, having witnessed their respective parents' murders. It took the jury only 10 minutes to return with guilty verdicts on all those charged (except Ram Lal, who was found not guilty and discharged). Henry Clark and the other three badmashes were hanged on 26 March 1913. Augusta's sentence was indeed commuted to life imprisonment. She gave birth to Henry Clark's son on 28 July 1913, and died of heatstroke at the age of 38 in Naini Prison, Allahabad, on 28 May 1914. Her son, christened Lovell Henry William Goodwyn, was rejected by both families, brought up in a Bengal orphanage, renamed William Hope and served with distinction in the Merchant Navy, before settling in Australia and raising a family. He died in 1975 without ever knowing who his natural parents were.

== Popular culture ==
The case featured as an episode of the 1970 six-part ITV series Wicked Women with Augusta Fullam played by Vivien Merchant.
