= Elvi Hale =

British actress (1931–2025)

- in 1959 in The Navy Lark
- Born: Patricia Elvira Hake; 29 January 1931; Romford, Essex, England
- Died: 1 March 2025 (aged 94)
- Education: Old Vic Theatre School
- Occupation: Actress
- Years active: 1957–1992
- Spouses: Mike Morgan (m. 1957; died 1958); George Murcell (m. 1961; died 1998)

Patricia Elvira Hake (29 January 1931 – 1 March 2025), known as Elvi Hale, was a British actress. She played Anne of Cleves in The Six Wives of Henry VIII, broadcast in 1970.

== Life and career ==
Hake was born on 29 January 1931, in Romford, Essex, where she was also raised. She was educated at Reed's School. Hake was discovered by Laurence Olivier, who saw her perform at the Old Vic Theatre School. Elvi played Heather, the love interest of Leslie Phillips (as Sub-Lieutenant Pouter) in the film version of The Navy Lark (1959), a role normally played by Heather Chasen in the radio series.

Hale was nominated for a BAFTA award for most promising film newcomer for her performance in Wendy Toye's True as a Turtle (1957). She portrayed the fourth of Henry VIII's wives, Anne of Cleves, in the BBC's six-part drama serial The Six Wives of Henry VIII first broadcast in 1970. She completely retired from all film and television work in 1990.

Hale was married to actor Mike Morgan until his death in 1958. She married character actor George Murcell in 1961; he died in 1998, at the age of 73. Hale died on 1 March 2025, at the age of 94.

== Partial filmography ==
- True as a Turtle (1957) - Ann
- Happy Is the Bride (1958) - Petula
- The Navy Lark (1959) - Leading WREN Heather
- Man Detained (1961) - Kay Simpson
- The Heroes of Telemark (1965) - Mrs. Sandersen
- Confession episode The Fell Sergeant (television play) (1970) - Judith Shelton
- Bel Ami (1971) - Clotilde de Marelle
- The Rivals of Sherlock Holmes (1 episode, 1971) - Lady Molly
- Upstairs, Downstairs episode "Guest of Honour" (1972) - Mrs. Millicent Hartfield
