= Bel Ami (British TV series) =

1971 British TV drama series

- Genre: Drama
- Based on: Bel-Ami
- Written by: Robert Muller, Guy de Maupassant
- Directed by: John Davies
- Starring: Robin Ellis; Suzanne Neve; Garfield Morgan; Elvi Hale; Margaret Courtenay; John Bryans; Maurice Quick; Peter Sallis; James Cossins; Arthur Pentelow
- Country of origin: England
- No. of series: 1
- No. of episodes: 5

Production
- Producer: Martin Lisemore
- Running time: 45 Minutes
- Production company: BBC

Original release
- Network: BBC Two
- Release: 8 May – 5 June 1971

Bel Ami is a British five part television costume drama based on the 1885 French novel Bel-Ami by Guy de Maupassant. It aired in 1971 on BBC 2. The series starred Robin Ellis as Georges Duroy, Suzanne Neve as Madeleine Forestier, Garfield Morgan as Jacques Rivat, Elvi Hale as Clotilde de Marelle, Margaret Courtenay as Madame Walter, John Bryans as Monsieur Walter, Maurice Quick as Duroy's manservant, Peter Sallis as Norbert de Varenne, James Cossins as Forestier and Arthur Pentelow as Tattel. British television historian Claire Monk wrote, "BBC Two's five-part Bel Ami indicatively exhibited the sexual attitudes of its time in its makers' insistence that the story of penniless opportunist Georges Duroy— a social outsider in Parisian society who ruthlessly uses sex to pursue his ambitions— as basically a comedy with the charms of a fantasy world."

== Cast ==
- Robin Ellis as Georges Duroy
- Suzanne Neve as Madeleine Forestier
- Garfield Morgan as Jacques Rivat
- Elvi Hale as Clotilde de Marelle
- Margaret Courtenay as Madame Walter
- John Bryans as Monsieur Walter
- Maurice Quick as Manservant/Duroy's Manservant
- Peter Sallis as Norbert de Varenne
- James Cossins as Forestier
- Arthur Pentelow as Tattle
- Wendy Allnutt as Suzanne Walter
- Michael Gover as M Larache-Mathieu
- John Wentworth as Comte de Vaudrec
- Gillian Bailey as Laurine
- Mitzi Rogers as Rachel

== Production ==
Robin Ellis was cast to the play the central main character, specifically for his sex appeal.

== Episodes ==
All five episodes from the series aired on BBC Two in colour from 8 May 1971 - 5 June 1971. The series is completely intact although none of the episodes have been released on VHS, DVD or any other home media platforms. The series is also not available to watch anywhere.

1. "Georges" (8 May 1971)
2. "Clotilde" (15 May 1971)
3. "Madeleine" (22 May 1971)
4. "Virginie" (29 May 1971)
5. "Suzanne" (5 June 1971)

== Reception ==
Seán Day-Lewis of The Daily Telegraph, praised the series and highlighted Robin Ellis' performance as Georges Duroy, noting that the character ends the story "nicely receiving the spoils of his wickedness".

John Pinkney of The Age, gave the series a broadly favourable review. He said that Robert Muller's script and the production faithfully mirrored the author's cloud shifts of attitude toward his characters. He also praised the series its atmosphere, period detail and its visual style. Although Pinkney regarded the story and its themes as morally bleak and found the protagonist unpleasant. He concluded that every episode of the series deserves to be put down in bottles and labelled: Vintage BBC.
