= Castleforward Demesne =

Townland in County Donegal, Ireland

Coordinates: 54.999813°N 7.490876°W

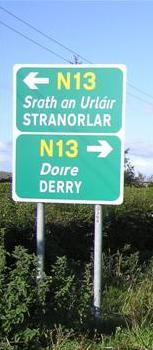
Derry to Stranorlar N13 road sign

Castleforward Demesne is a townland just east of Newtowncunningham, a village in The Laggan, a district in the east of County Donegal in Ireland. The townland is near the south-eastern shores of Lough Swilly and is in the Barony of Raphoe North.
