= George Murcell =

British actor (1925–1998)

- Murcell in The Champions
- Born: Arthur George Murcell; 30 October 1925; Naples, Campania, Italy
- Died: 3 December 1998 (aged 73); Isleworth, Middlesex, England
- Occupations: Film, stage and television actor Theatre director
- Years active: 1952–1996
- Organization: Royal Shakespeare Company
- Spouse(s): Josephine Tweedy (m. 1953–1960) (divorced) Elvi Hale (m. 1960–1998) (his death)

Arthur George Murcell (30 October 1925 – 3 December 1998) was a British character actor.

== Life and career ==
Born in Italy, he made his film debut in Michael Powell and Emeric Pressburger's The Battle of the River Plate (1956), Murcell went on to develop a career playing snarling villains in both film and television. These could either be stupid, brutish henchmen, as in Hell Drivers and Campbell's Kingdom (both 1957), or sophisticated rogues, such as Needle in "You Have Just Been Murdered", an episode of The Avengers.

He specialised in playing foreign characters, including Germans, Russians and South Americans. A number of these roles were in ITC adventure TV series of the 1960s and 1970s, such as Danger Man, The Baron, The Saint, The Champions (The Iron Man and Reply Box No. 666 episodes, 1968), Randall and Hopkirk (Deceased), The Persuaders! and Jason King. His film roles included Sea of Sand (1958), The Fall of the Roman Empire (1964), The Heroes of Telemark (1965), Kaleidoscope (1966), The Fixer (1968), A Dandy in Aspic (1968), The Assassination Bureau (1969), A Walk with Love and Death (1969), Penny Gold (1973), Special Branch (1974), Inside the Third Reich (1982, as Hermann Göring), Year of the Gun (1991), and Cutthroat Island (1995).

He enjoyed a long stage career, which involved working with Tyrone Guthrie and Peter Brook, and was active in the Royal Shakespeare Company. In the 1970s, he acquired a Victorian church in North London, which he converted into an Elizabethan-style theatre in collaboration with director Adrian Brown. In 1973, he opened it as "St George's Theatre", intending that it present little-seen classical plays.

Throughout the 1970s and 1980s, he continued to work at St George's Theatre as both an actor and a director, often with his wife, Elvi Hale.

== Personal life ==
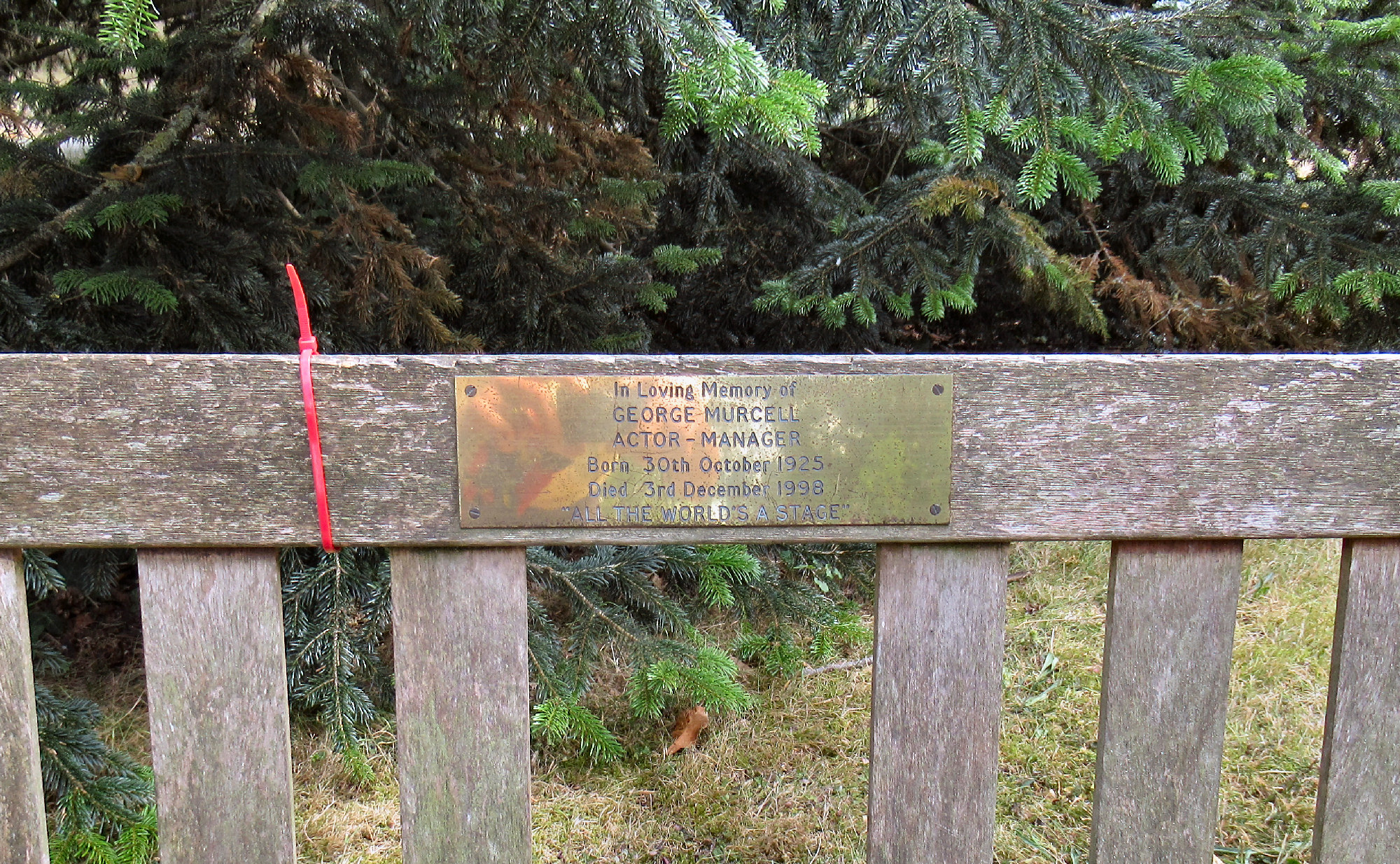
George Murcell memorial bench

Murcell married his first wife, Josephine Tweedy, in 1953. His second wife was the British actress Elvi Hale, to whom he was married from 1961 until his death in 1998. Away from acting, Murcell was also an accomplished musician and linguist. He died on 3 December 1998, aged 73. A bench dedicated to him is placed near the bridge crossing the lake at Kew Gardens.

== Filmography ==
- Silent Witness (1953) – Policeman (uncredited)
- The Battle of the River Plate (1956) – Chief Officer, Newton Beach (uncredited)
- High Tide at Noon (1957) – Ash Breck (uncredited)
- The Steel Bayonet (1957) – Warren
- Hell Drivers (1957) – Tub
- Campbell's Kingdom (1957) – Max
- Blood of the Vampire (1958) – First Guard
- Sea Fury (1958) – Loudon
- Sea of Sand (1958) – Cpl. Simms
- Jet Storm (1959) – Saunders
- Don't Panic Chaps! (1959) – Meister
- The Angry Silence (1960) – Jones
- Crossroads to Crime (1960) – Diamond
- The Pursuers (1961) – Freddy
- In Search of the Castaways (1962) – Ayerton's Assistant
- The Fall of the Roman Empire (1964) – Victorinus
- The Heroes of Telemark (1965) – Sturmfuhrer
- Kaleidoscope (1966) – Johnny
- You Only Live Twice (1967) – Russian Diplomat (uncredited)
- A Dandy in Aspic (1968) – Sgt Harris
- The Fixer (1968) – Deputy Warden
- The Assassination Bureau (1969) – Zeppelin pilot (uncredited)
- A Walk with Love and Death (1969) – The Captain
- The Horsemen (1971) – Mizrar
- Si può essere più bastardi dell'ispettore Cliff? (1963)
- Penny Gold (1973) – Doctor Merrick
- Rime of the Ancient Mariner (1975) – William Wordsworth (voice)
- Penelope Pulls It Off (1975) – Owen
- Inside the Third Reich (1982) – Hermann Göring
- The Blind Side of God (1987)
- Year of the Gun (1991) – Pierre Bernier
- The Assassinator (1992) – Colonel Bradley
- Cutthroat Island (1995) – Mordachai Fingers
