= Joyce Cary =

Anglo-Irish writer (1888–1957)

1950s Penguin photograph of Joyce Cary

Arthur Joyce Lunel Cary (7 December 1888 – 29 March 1957), known as Joyce Cary, was an Anglo-Irish novelist and colonial official. His most notable novels include Mister Johnson and The Horse's Mouth.

== Early life and education ==
Arthur Joyce Lunel Cary was born in 1888 in his grandparents' home, which was above the Belfast Bank on Shipquay Street in Derry in Ulster, the Northern province in Ireland. His family had been 'Planter' landlords in neighbouring Inishowen, a peninsula on the north coast of County Donegal, also in Ulster, since the early years of the Plantation of Ulster in the early seventeenth century. However, the family had largely lost its Inishowen property on the western shores of Lough Foyle after the passage of the Irish Land Act in 1882. The family dispersed and Cary had uncles who served in the frontier US Cavalry and the Canadian North-West Mounted Police. Most of the Carys wound up in Great Britain. Arthur Cary, his father, moved to London in 1884 and trained as an engineer. He then married Charlotte Joyce, elder daughter of James John Joyce, manager of the Belfast Bank, Derry, in August 1887 and they settled in London. His mother died of pneumonia in October 1898.

Throughout his childhood, Cary spent many summers at his grandmother's house in the north of Ireland and at Cromwell House in England, home of a great-uncle, which served as a base for all the Cary clan. Some of this upbringing is described in the fictionalised memoir A House of Children (1941) and the novel Castle Corner (1938) – i.e., Cary Castle, one of his family's lost properties in Inishowen in Ulster. Although Cary remembered his West Ulster childhood with affection and wrote about it with great feeling, he was based in England for the rest of his life. The feeling of displacement and the idea that life's tranquillity may be disturbed at any moment marked Cary and informs much of his writing. His health was poor as a child. He was subject to asthma, which recurred throughout his life, and was nearly blind in one eye, which caused him to wear a monocle when he was in his twenties. Cary was educated at Clifton College in Bristol, England, where he was a member of Dakyns House. His mother died during this period, leaving him a small legacy which served as his financial base until the 1930s.

In 1906, determined to be an artist, Cary travelled to Paris. Discovering that he needed more technical training, Cary then studied art in Edinburgh. Soon enough, he determined that he could never be more than a third rate painter and decided to apply himself to literature. He published a volume of poems which, by his own later account, was "pretty bad," and then entered Trinity College, Oxford. There he became friends with fellow student John Middleton Murry and introduced Murry to Paris on a holiday together. He neglected his studies and graduated from Oxford with a fourth class degree.

== Nigeria and early writing ==
Seeking adventure, in 1912 Cary left for the Kingdom of Montenegro and served as a Red Cross orderly during the Balkan Wars. Cary kept and illustrated a record of his experiences there, Memoir of the Bobotes (1964), that was not published until after his death.

Returning to Britain the next year, Cary sought a post with an Irish agricultural cooperative scheme, but the project fell through; instead he joined the Nigerian political service. During the First World War, he served with a Nigerian regiment fighting in the German colony of Kamerun. The short story "Umaru" (1921) describes an incident from this period in which a British officer recognises the common humanity that connects him with his African sergeant.

Cary was wounded at the battle of Mount Mora in 1916. He returned to England on leave and proposed marriage to Gertrude Ogilvie, the sister of a friend, whom he had been courting for years. Three months later, Cary returned to service as a colonial officer, leaving a pregnant Gertrude in England. Cary held several posts in Nigeria including that of the magistrate and executive officer in Borgu. He began his African service as a stereotypical district officer, determined to bring order to the natives, but by the end of his service, he had come to see the Nigerians as individuals with hard lives.

By 1920, Cary was concentrating his energies on providing clean water and roads to connect remote villages with the larger world. A second leave had left Gertrude pregnant with their second child. She begged Cary to retire from the colonial service, so that they could live together in Britain. Cary had thought this impossible for financial reasons, but in 1920, he obtained a literary agent and some of the stories he had written while in Africa were sold to The Saturday Evening Post. He published ten early stories under the name Thomas Joyce. This provided Cary with enough incentive to resign from the Nigerian service and he and Gertrude took a house in Oxford on Parks Road opposite the University Parks (now marked with a blue plaque) for their growing family. They had four sons, including the composer, Tristram Cary, and the civil servant, Sir Michael Cary.

== As a novelist in the 1930s ==
Cary worked hard on developing as a writer, but his brief economic success soon ended as the Post decided that his stories had become too "literary". Cary worked on various novels and a play, but nothing sold, and the family soon had to take in tenants. Their plight worsened when the Depression wiped out the investments that provided them with income and, at one point, the family rented out their house and lived with family members. Finally, in 1932, Cary managed to publish Aissa Saved, a novel that drew on his Nigerian experience. The book was not particularly successful, but sold more than Cary's next novel, An American Visitor (1933), even though that book had some critical success. The African Witch (1936) did a little better, and the Carys managed to move back into their home.

Although none of Cary's first three novels was particularly successful critically or financially, they are progressively more ambitious and complex. Indeed, The African Witch (1936) is so rich in incident, character, and thematic possibility that it over-burdens its structure. Cary understood that he needed to find new ways to make the narrative form carry his ideas. George Orwell, on his return from Spain, recommended Cary to the Liberal Book Club, which requested Cary to put together a work outlining his ideas on freedom and liberty, a basic theme in all his novels. It was released as Power in Men (1939) [not Cary's title], but the publisher seriously cut the manuscript without Cary's approval and he was most unhappy with the book. Now Cary contemplated a trilogy of novels based on his Irish background. Castle Corner (1938) did not do well and Cary abandoned the idea. After this came one last African novel, Mister Johnson (1939), written entirely in the present tense. Although now regarded as one of Cary's best novels, it sold poorly at the time. But Charley Is My Darling (1940), about displaced young people at the start of World War II, found a wider readership, and the memoir A House of Children (1941) won the James Tait Black Memorial Prize for best novel.

== Final years ==
Cary now undertook his great works examining historical and social change in England during his own lifetime. The First Trilogy (Herself Surprised, To Be a Pilgrim, and The Horse's Mouth) finally provided Cary with a reasonable income, and The Horse's Mouth remains his most popular novel. Cary's pamphlet The Case for African Freedom (1941), published by Orwell's Searchlight Books series, had attracted some interest, and the film director Thorold Dickinson asked for Cary's help in developing a wartime movie set partly in Africa. In 1943, while writing The Horse's Mouth, Cary travelled to Africa with a film crew to work on Men of Two Worlds.

Cary travelled to India in 1946 on a second film project with Dickinson, but the struggle against the British for national independence made movie-making impossible, and the project was abandoned. The Moonlight (1946), a novel about the difficulties of women, ended a long period of intense creativity for Cary. Gertrude was suffering from cancer and his output slowed for a while. Gertrude died as A Fearful Joy (1949) was being published. Cary was now at the height of his fame and fortune. He began preparing a series of prefatory notes for the re-publication of all his works in a standard edition published by Michael Joseph.

He visited the United States, collaborated on a stage adaptation of Mister Johnson, and was offered an appointment as a CBE, which he refused. Meanwhile, he continued work on the three novels that make up the Second Trilogy (Prisoner of Grace, Except the Lord, and Not Honour More). In 1952, Cary had some muscle problems which were originally diagnosed as bursitis, but as more symptoms were noted over the next two years, the diagnosis was changed to that of motor neuron disease (known as Lou Gehrig's disease (ALS) in North America), a wasting and gradual paralysis that was terminal. As his physical powers failed, Cary had to have a pen tied to his hand and his arm supported by a rope to write. Finally, he resorted to dictation until unable to speak and then ceased writing for the first time since 1912. His last work, The Captive and the Free (1959), the first volume of a projected trilogy on religion, was unfinished at his death on 29 March 1957, aged 68.

== Legacy ==
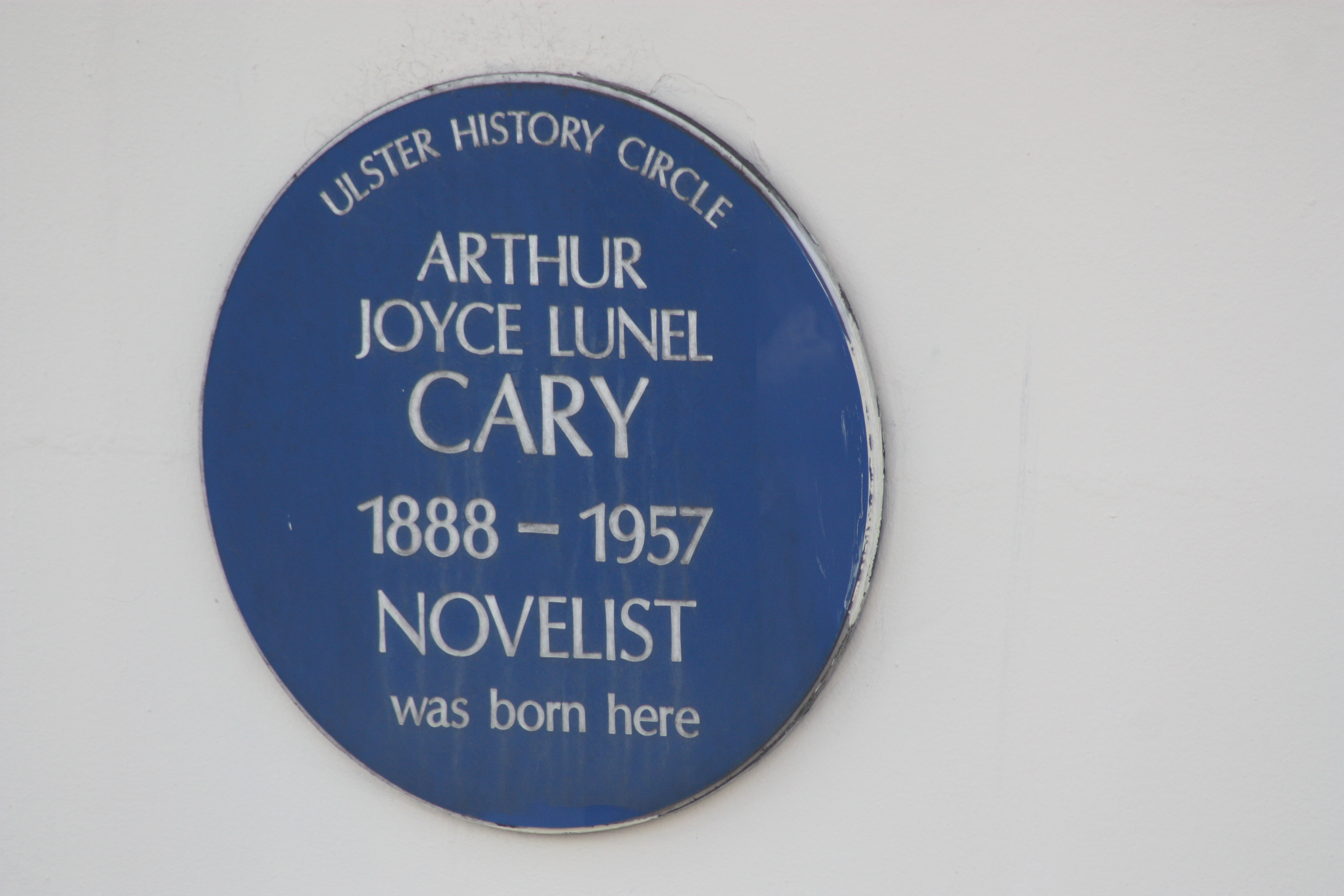
Blue plaque in Bank Place, beside Shipquay Gate, Derry, August 2009

He had appointed his close friend Winnie Davin as his literary executor, and she supervised the transfer of his library to the Bodleian Library, posthumously published some unfinished works, and supported scholars who studied his papers. She also wrote Cary's entry for the Dictionary of National Biography.

== Selected works ==
- Verse (as Arthur Cary, 1908)
- Aissa Saved (1932)
- An American Visitor (1933)
- The African Witch (1936)
- Castle Corner (1938)
- Power in Men (1939)
- Mister Johnson (1939)
- Charley is My Darling (1940)
- A House of Children (1941)
- Herself Surprised (1941)
- The Case for African Freedom (1941)
- To Be a Pilgrim (1942)
- Process of Real Freedom (1943)
- The Horse's Mouth (1944)
- Marching Soldier (1945)
- The Moonlight (1946)
- Britain and West Africa (1947)
- The Drunken Sailor: A Ballad-Epic (1947)
- A Fearful Joy (1949)
- Prisoner of Grace (1952)
- Except the Lord (1953)
- Not Honour More (1955)
- The Old Strife at Plant’s (1956)
- Art and Reality (1958)
- The Captive and the Free (1959)
- Spring Song and other Stories (1960)
- The Case for African Freedom, and Other Writings on Africa (1962)
- Memoir of the Bobotes (1964)
- Cock Jarvis: An Unfinished Novel (1974)
- Selected Essays (1976), ed. Alan Bishop

== See also ==
- List of Irish writers
