= I Dies from Love =

- Upstairs, Downstairs episode
- Episode no.: Season 1 Episode 8
- Directed by: Raymond Menmuir
- Written by: Terence Brady Charlotte Bingham
- Original air date: 30 January 1972

Episode chronology
← Previous "Magic Casements"	Next → "Why Is Her Door Locked?"

"I Dies from Love" is the eighth episode of the first series of the British television series, Upstairs, Downstairs. The episode is set in the spring of 1907.

"I Dies from Love" was among the episodes omitted from Upstairs, Downstairs' initial Masterpiece Theatre broadcast in 1974, and was consequently not shown on US television until 1989.

== Plot ==
Emily, the scullery maid, had fallen in love with William, the footman of Mrs. Van Groeben, a conceited nouveau riche woman new to London from Cape Town, South Africa, who calls on Lady Marjorie for a Charity Committee she is involved with. Lady Prudence Fairfax, Marjorie's best friend, and Lady Templeton, a slightly eccentric elderly lady, are also involved with the committee. Prudence voices her annoyance with Mrs. Van Groeben, though Marjorie says she is a good person. Mrs. Van Groeben tells Lady Marjorie that their charity should only support few privileged servants, which Marjorie disagrees with, then changes the subject, attempting to impress Marjorie with news of Lord Nicholson's house party, which backfires when Marjorie reveals her close friendship with him.

Though Emily also works as an under-house parlourmaid, her kitchen work suffers because of her ardor for William, and receives verbal lashings from Mrs Bridges and, to a lesser extent, from Rose. Emily and William often spend their days off together, and she wants nothing more than to marry him. However, Mrs. Van Groben forbids the relationship out of envy and forbids William from seeing her, and after bribing him with promises of a new uniform and increased status, he obeys. Lady Marjorie tells Emily that William cannot see her anymore. With the exception of Rose, the staff are too preoccupied to notice Emily's misery. Mrs. Bridges taunts Emily, until Rose stops her and comforts a sobbing Emily.

Emily sends William a love letter, penned by Rose, declaring her love for him. However, the next morning, William ignores her, while Harris, the Van Groebens' head coachman, returns her letter and encourages Emily to look forward to the servants' outing to Hampstead Heath.

The next day, Emily, overcome with grief, hangs herself in her room. Rose, who discovered Emily's dead body, tells Hudson, who tells Lady Marjorie. Mrs. Bridges sits in her chair crying and feeling guilty, and the Bellamy staff stay behind from the outing. Hudson has the undertakers take her body out of the house.

In the novelisation of the scripts by John Hawkesworth, it is told that after Emily kills herself, the other Bellamy servants viciously condemn William, and Lady Marjorie severs all social contact with Mrs. Van Groeben and her family because of the tragedy. However, in the series' next episode, "Why Is Her Door Locked?", Lady Marjorie mentions that Mrs. Van Groeben raved about a dinner that Mrs. Bridges had prepared the previous night.

== Cast ==
Regular cast

- Evin Crowley (Emily)

Guest cast

- Aimée Delamain (Lady Templeton)
- Yolande Turner (Mrs Van Groeben)
- Charles Lamb (Harris)
- Tom Marshall (William)
- Patricia Hamilton (Mrs Fellows)
- Robin Wentworth (the Policeman)
- Carl Bernard (Waterman)
- Christopher Wray (Lowe)
