= John Bryans =

British actor

- Born: 5 August 1942
- Died: 2 March 1989 (aged 46)
- Occupation: Actor

John Bryans (5 August 1942 – 2 March 1989) was a British actor, who appeared frequently on television.

He is possibly best known for his recurring role as Bercol during the first two series of Blake's 7. He also appeared in the third series as the torturer Shrinker. He also appeared in the Doctor Who serial The Creature from the Pit.

Other television credits include: Justice, Bel Ami, Danger Man, The Baron, Dixon of Dock Green, Z-Cars, The Champions, Softly, Softly, The First Lady, Randall and Hopkirk (Deceased), The Guardians, The Troubleshooters, Colditz, Rock Follies, The Gentle Touch, Wilde Alliance and Only Fools and Horses. His film roles included the estate agent in the horror anthology The House That Dripped Blood (1971), and Cardinal Wolsey in Henry VIII and His Six Wives (1972).

== Filmography ==
- The Verdict (1964) – Prendergast
- Downfall (1964) – Arlett
- The House That Dripped Blood (1971) – A.J. Stoker
- Henry VIII and His Six Wives (1972) – Wolsey
