= Christopher Wray Lighting works =

Grade II listed building in Birmingham, England

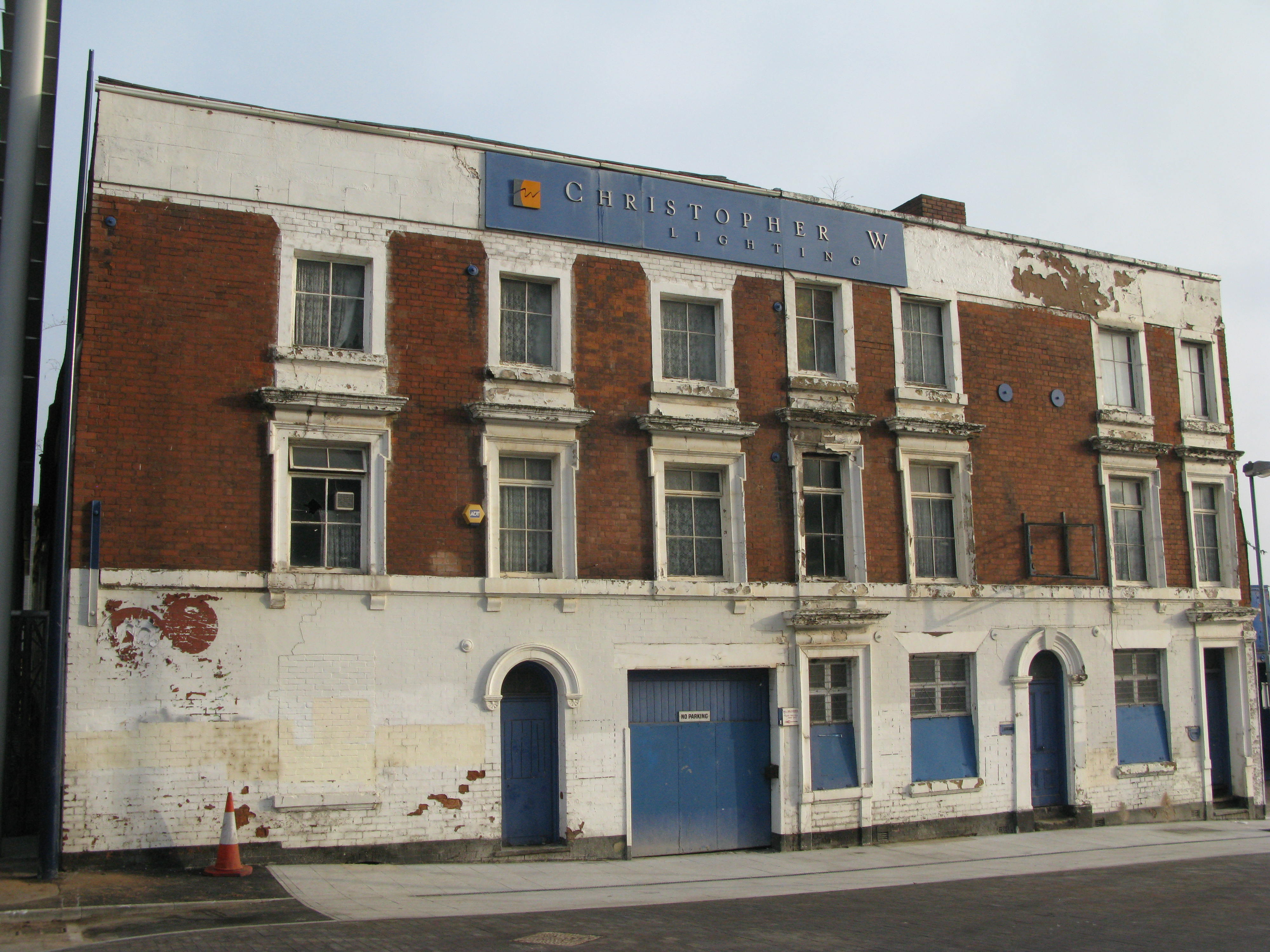
- Interactive map of the Christopher Wray Lighting works area

General information
- Status: Undergoing restoration
- Type: Terraced
- Architectural style: Georgian
- Location: Birmingham, England
- Coordinates: 52.481989°N 1.888599°W
- Construction started: Eighteenth century

Design and construction
- Designations: Grade II-listed

Christopher Wray Lighting works is a grade II-listed building in the east side of Birmingham city centre, England. The works consist of a complex of buildings fronted by a row of three townhouses, left vacant since 2003.

Parts of the building complex date back to the eighteenth century when they were built as terraced houses in the Georgian period.
