= Magic Casements =

- Upstairs, Downstairs episode
- Episode no.: Season 1 Episode 7
- Original air date: 23 January 1972

Episode chronology
← Previous "A Cry for Help"	Next → "I Dies from Love"

"Magic Casements" is the seventh episode of the first series of the British television series, Upstairs, Downstairs. The episode is set in the summer of 1906.

"Magic Casements" was among the episodes omitted from Upstairs, Downstairs' initial Masterpiece Theatre broadcast in 1974, and was consequently not shown on US television until 1989.

== Plot ==
When Richard Bellamy is unable to go with his wife to an opera because he has to attend a political meeting, adding to the friction which has already developed between them over Richard's political stance, he asks Charles Hammond, a friend of his son James who is fanatical about opera, to go instead. They greatly enjoy the opera, and each other's company.

A few days later, in a bookshop, they meet again and Charles asks her to read him "Ode To A Nightingale" by Keats. They go to his house, where she reads and plays the piano for him. Charles admits that he loves her, and she admits that she cares for him as well. They begin to have an affair. In spite of Lady Marjorie's attempts to hide it - she burns the note that comes with the bouquet of roses that Charles has sent her - the servants get wind of it and then discover a boxful of love letters. We see Charles and Marjorie in bed together and dancing to a gramophone record together. Charles wants to make the affair public, and urges Marjorie to divorce Richard. Marjorie insists that the affair be kept secret a while longer.

James and Charles plan to participate in a regatta. Hudson, the butler, sees a newspaper report that there has been an accident at the regatta, and tells Lady Marjorie. She bursts into tears, and Hudson and Richard assume that she is worried about James. Charles arrives at the house to tell Marjorie that he is safe, and Hudson walks in on them as they are embracing - they break apart before Richard can see them, and he assumes that Charles is there on James' behalf. James returns and Richard admonishes him for not having let Marjorie know he was safe; James replies that he had been unable to participate in the regatta because he had to stand in court in place of a friend, who had "got the collywobbles" at the last minute, and that he had phoned Marjorie at lunchtime to tell her.

Richard begins to piece together what has happened but rather than losing his temper with his wife, he tells her that he has changed his political stance, as it is a question of loyalty. Marjorie realises that she must also be loyal, so she sends a note to Charles, asking her to meet him at the opera; there, she ends the affair, bidding him a tearful farewell. He gives her a locket on a chain as a gift, and she dissolves into sobs after he has left.

== Cast ==
Guest cast

- David Kernan – Capt. Charles Hammond
- Harold Bennett – Book Shop Assistant
- Maureen Neill – Young Student
- David Pelton – Young Student
- Tom Collister – Professor
- Joyce Freeman – Woman in Bookshop
- John Demarco – Waiter

== The title ==
The episode's title is taken from Keats' 1820 poem Ode to a Nightingale, verse 7:

Charm'd magic casements, opening on the foam
Of perilous seas, in faery lands forlorn.
