= Mike Morgan (actor) =

British actor

Mike Morgan (1929 – 5 June 1958), born John Michael Pughe-Morgan, was a British actor, trained at the Old Vic Theatre School. He appeared in several TV programmes and made his film acting debut in the 1957 film comedy Barnacle Bill, which starred Sir Alec Guinness.

Morgan played a much larger role in another film with Guinness, The Horse's Mouth, as Nosey, a sidekick of Guinness's character, Gulley Jimson. However, shortly before filming ended, he fell ill with meningitis and died before the film was completed; some of his lines were therefore dubbed by another actor.

== Personal life ==
Morgan was married to actress Elvi Hale until his death in 1958.

== Filmography ==
Year	Title	Role	Notes
1957	Barnacle Bill	Larry	
1958	The Horse's Mouth	Nosey	(final film role)
