= Danny Sewell =

British boxer and actor (1930–2001)

Danny Sewell in 1963

Dennis Edward "Danny" Sewell (18 November 1930 – 18 May 2001) was a British professional heavyweight boxer and actor who created the role of Bill Sikes in the 1960 stage musical Oliver!. He remained in the role for the original Broadway production, which premiered in early 1963, and for several national tours.

== Early life ==
Sewell was born in London, the son of a Hoxton printer and bookmaker father and florist mother. He was the younger brother of the actor George Sewell.

A champion-boxer as a schoolboy, in 1946 aged 16 Danny Sewell became a professional and undefeated light-heavyweight and heavyweight boxer, winning all 7 of his fights with 5 knockouts. Regarded as a contender for the World Heavyweight title, he contracted polio at age 18 during a worldwide epidemic and spent a year in an iron lung in a Spokane, Washington, hospital paid for by British sportsmen. He recovered and returned to boxing but, as Sewell once said, “It was never the same. I'd lost the old spark.” He gave up boxing and became a physical training instructor on the Queen Mary and other Cunard Line ships, before going on to manage a Bethnal Green pub and eventually try his hand at acting.” In 1953 he married Betty Frances Anderson with whom he had four children: Laura, Daniel, George and Andrew Sewell. The marriage was later dissolved and Sewell remarried. His National Service was spent as a Physical Training Instructor in the Royal Air Force, for whom he also boxed. Soon after Sewell turned to acting; his first stage role was in One More River (1959) at the Duke of York's Theatre in London while his television and film roles included First Waterman in Nick of the River (1959), Sam in Where the Party Ended (1960), Soho layabout in No Hiding Place (1960), and Boxer in Armchair Theatre (1960). He had uncredited roles in the films Saturday Night and Sunday Morning (1960) and The Criminal (1960).

== Sikes in Oliver! ==
Sewell created the role of Bill Sikes in the 1960 stage musical Oliver! and remained in the role (including the original Broadway and US touring productions) for the best part of six years. Sewell's main competitor at audition for the role of Sikes was Michael Caine, who later stated he "cried for a week" after failing to secure the part. Sewell sang on the UK and US cast albums of Oliver!.

Sewell was disappointed not to be offered the role of Sikes in the 1968 film Oliver!, which went to Oliver Reed.

== Later career ==
He played Avery in Partners in Crime (1961) in The Edgar Wallace Mystery Theatre; Sgt. Major Roughage in Bonehead (1962); Teddy Scammell in The Expert (1969) with George Sewell as Louis Scammell; Ryder in Dixon of Dock Green (1968); Billy McCance in Z-Cars (1968); Gideon the Gaoler in Rogues' Gallery (1968), and Weston in Man at the Top (1973).

Sewell played Chitterlow in the second national tour of Half a Sixpence (1966) and Luke in the original Off-Broadway production of Lady Audley's Secret (1972). On Broadway in 1967 he took over the role of Joey in The Homecoming and returned to the role in an Off-Broadway revival in 1971 for which he won an Obie in 1972, while in 1974 he also took over the role of Harry Dalton in Equus. He appeared in the Broadway production of the play The Elephant Man in 1979.

Danny Sewell retired to Sarasota, Florida, with his second wife, actress Donna Gerdes. He died in Sarasota in 2001.
