= Keith Anderson (actor) =

British actor

- Born: 10 April 1929; Barton upon Irwell, Lancashire, England
- Died: 2 February 2007 (aged 77); Surrey, England
- Occupation: Actor
- Television: The Adventures of Robin Hood; The Avengers

Keith Anderson (10 April 1929 – 2 February 2007) was a British television actor. He often played policemen or officials. Appearances include The Adventures of Robin Hood (1957-1960), The Avengers (1961), Doctor Who (1964), Crossroads (1964), Gideon's Way (1965), The Man in the Mirror (1966), Z-Cars (1967-1971), Thriller (1975) and Dixon of Dock Green (1975).

== Filmography ==
- A Night to Remember (1958) - Assistant Purser (uncredited)
- Burke & Hare (1972) - Client in Brothel
