= Jimmy Mac (actor) =

Scottish actor

Jimmy Mac (26 August 1902 – 18 May 1984) was a Scottish actor.

He played Warwick in the long running department store sitcom Are You Being Served?. He also appeared in Dad's Army, The Invisible Man, Nutcracker, Keep off the Grass, Jane, Hi-de-Hi!, Grange Hill, Thomas and Sarah, Moll Flanders, Churchill's People and many other television shows.

Prior to television, Jimmy was a stand-up comedian in the early 1950s and 1960s at Jackson Earle's Melody Inn Review at the Floral Pavilion, New Brighton, Wirral. He died on 18 May 1984, at the age of 81.
