= Samuel Leve =

Set and lighting designer (1908–1999)

Samuel Leve (December 1, 1908 – December 6, 1999) was a Russian-born American scenic and lighting designer. He immigrated to the United States after his family fled a pogrom in 1920. A graduate of the Yale School of Drama, he had a prolific career as a designer for Broadway plays and musicals from the 1930s through the 1960s. In his early career he was known for working closely with Orson Welles as a designer in residence at the Mercury Theatre. He was also active as a designer and art director for American television.

== Early life and education ==
Samuel Leve was born in Ivanava, Russian Empire, in what is now Belarus, on December 1, 1908. (Note: Owen gives Leve's date of birth as December 7, 1910. Leve's date of birth in Social Security documents is given as December 1, 1910. However, a photograph of Leve's gravestone viewable at findagrave.com shows the tombstone marker with a date of birth as December 1, 1908. This is also the date of birth given for Leve in the Internet Broadway Database linked in the external links. The birth year of 1908 also matches the biographical account of Leve published by the Museum of Jewish Heritage.) In describing the instability of the political situation in his hometown during his childhood, Leve stated in an interview in The New York Times "I was born in Czarist Russia, lived in Germany three years, lived in Poland two years and lived in the Soviet Union one year and never moved out of the same little town until we came to America." His family was Jewish, and they permanently left his hometown when fleeing a pogrom in 1920.

In 1920 Leve immigrated to the United States. He was twelve years old at this time. He spent his teenage years growing up in a Jewish community in East Harlem, and became interested in scenic design while performing in religious plays put on by the Uptown Talmud Torah Association and in other kinds of plays with the Tranquillity Settlement House. After graduating from De Witt Clinton High School, he studied at Cooper Union. He was concurrently a student at Jewish Theological Seminary of America. He later pursued further studies at the Pratt Institute, the Mechanics Institute, and the Yale School of Drama. He graduated with a degree in design from Yale.

== Career ==
=== Stage designer ===
Leve began his career designing for stock theatre. In the 1930s he designed shows for the Federal Theatre Project, including the 1937 Broadway production of Revolt of the Beavers which was featured in the 1999 film Cradle Will Rock. In the late 1930s he designed many of the shows put on at the Mercury Theatre by Orson Welles including the celebrated 1937 Broadway revival of Shakespeare's Julius Caesar and the 1938 revival of Thomas Dekker's The Shoemaker's Holiday. The actor Al Weaver portrayed Leve in the 2008 film Me and Orson Welles set during this time period of his life.

Some of the many other Broadway shows Leve designed for included Ibsen's The Wild Duck (1938, 49th Street Theatre), Theodore Pratt's The Big Blow (1938, Maxine Elliott's Theatre), Oscar Saul and H. R. Hays's Medicine Show (1940, New Yorker Theatre), William Saroyan's The Beautiful People (1941, Lyceum Theatre), Edwin B. Self's The Distant City (1941, Longacre Theatre), Shakespeare's Macbeth (1941, National Theatre), They Should Have Stood in Bed (1942, Mansfield Theatre), Beat the Band (1942, 46th Street Theatre), Harry Brown's A Sound of Hunting (1945, Lyceum Theatre), John Patrick's The Story of Mary Surratt (1947, Henry Miller's Theatre), Buttrio Square (1952, New Century Theatre), Comes a Day (1958, Ambassador Theatre), and Cafe Crown (1964, Martin Beck Theatre).

Leve was the scenic designer for the world premiere production of the Bernard Rogers and Norman Corwin opera The Warrior, performed by the Metropolitan Opera company at the Metropolitan Opera House on January 11, 1947. He was the designer for the "Chanukah Festival for Israel" at Madison Square Garden (MSG) in December 1954. He worked at MSG again in 1962 as the lighting designer for the event where Marilyn Monroe famously sang "Happy Birthday, Mr. President" to John F. Kennedy. His lighting design unintentionally made Monroe's dress become see-through.

Leve was also active in Yiddish theatre in New York, and several artifacts related to his work in this area are part of the collection at Museum of Jewish Heritage. Outside of New York, he designed productions staged in London, Rio de Janeiro, Canada, and Israel. In 1965 he designed the sets for a production of The Nutcracker ballet at Arie Crown Theater in Chicago. He was the lighting designer for the Canadian Armed Forces Tattoo 1967 which played on tour to stadiums and arenas. By the end of his career he had made designs for more than 100 professional productions.

=== Television and other work ===
Leve also worked as a designer for American television. By 1950 he was responsible for designing and overseeing the construction of all the sets made for the Ford Theatre program. In 1953, he was appointed scenic designer and lighting consultant for WDSU television in New Orleans having previously worked as a designer for The Fred Waring Show and The Nash Airflyte Theater.

One of Leve's contributions to The Fred Waring Show was the set designs for the introduction of the song "Israel" in April 1953; music which served as the official song of the State of Israel Bond Drive campaign. He had earlier served as designer for an event organized by Billy Rose at Ebbets Field celebrating the 4th anniversary of the State of Israel in April 1952; an event attended by 32,000 people which also raising funds for the bond drive. It featured the New York Philharmonic conducted by Izler Solomon; a speech delivered by Eleanor Roosevelt; and performances by Jennie Tourel, Milton Berle, and Sid Caesar.

Leve was the designer for The Revlon Mirror Theater (1953) and Medallion Theatre (1953). He was the art director for multiple American television specials including Pinocchio (1957) starring Mickey Rooney, and Hansel and Gretel (1958) starring Barbara Cook, Red Buttons, Rudy Vallee, Rise Stevens, and Hans Conried. He also designed sets for The Polly Bergen Show.

Leve gave lectures at Yale University, Florida State University, and New York University. In 1987 he gave a lecture on Yiddish theatre titled "Synagogue and the Theater" at Anshe Sholom Synagogue in New Rochelle. He authored books, including one on Jewish art.

== Personal life and death ==
Leve was married to the jewelry designer Shirley Leve (nee Book). They had one daughter, Teri. Shirley Leve was an art educator who at one point was chairman of the art department at George Washington High School in Manhattan. The Leves never divorced, but had a lengthy separation of 42 years that ended when Samuel died.

Samuel Leve died in Manhattan at St. Luke's-Roosevelt Hospital Center on December 6, 1999, at the age of 91.

== Notes and references ==
=== Bibliography ===
- Dietz, Dan (2015). The Complete Book of 1940s Broadway Musicals. Rowman & Littlefield Publishers. ISBN 9781442245280.
- Dietz, Dan (2014). The Complete Book of 1950s Broadway Musicals. Rowman & Littlefield Publishers. ISBN 9781442235052.
- Fisher, James (2021). Historical Dictionary of Contemporary American Theater. Vol. I. Bloomsbury Publishing. ISBN 9798216310167.
- Owen, Bobbi (2003). "Samuel Leve". The Broadway Design Roster: Designers and Their Credits. Greenwood Press. ISBN 9780313319150.
- Santi, Patricia Delli; Perruso, Alison, eds. (2009). "Leve, Shirley Book". Who's Who In America with World Notables 2008-2009. Vol. XX.
- Wlaschin, Ken (2006). "The Warrior". Encyclopedia of American Opera. McFarland & Company. ISBN 0786421096.
- Zanger, Brenda; Burdick, Elizabeth B.; Hansen, Peggy C., eds. (1975). "Samuel Leve". Contemporary Stage Design, U.S.A. International Theatre Institute of the United States.
