= The Rising of the Moon (disambiguation) =

The Rising of the Moon is an Irish ballad. The title may also refer to:

- The Rising of the Moon (play), a 1907 play by Augusta, Lady Gregory
- The Rising of the Moon (novel), a 1945 mystery novel by Gladys Mitchell
- The Rising of the Moon (film), a 1957 anthology film directed by John Ford; one segment is based on Lady Gregory's play
- The Rising of the Moon (album), by the Clancy Brothers
- The Rising of the Moon (opera), composed by Nicholas Maw to a libretto by Beverley Cross
