= Betsy Blair =

American actress (1923–2009)

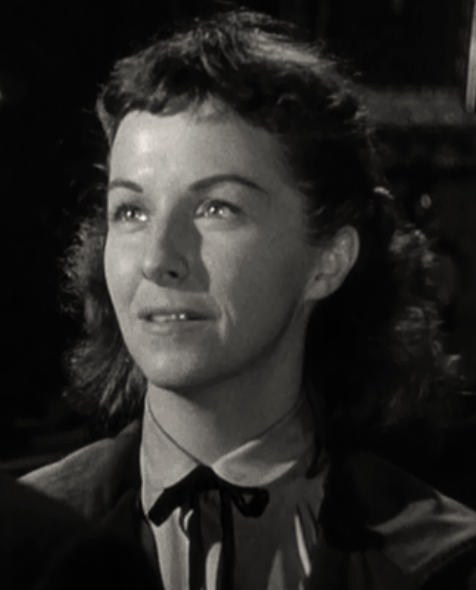
- Blair in Marty (1955)
- Born: Elizabeth Winifred Boger; December 11, 1923; Cliffside Park, New Jersey, U.S.
- Died: March 13, 2009 (aged 85); London, England
- Occupation: Actress
- Years active: 1947–2003
- Known for: Marty; Calle Mayor; Il Grido; The Guilt of Janet Ames; The Snake Pit
- Spouses: Gene Kelly (m. 1941; div. 1957) Karel Reisz (m. 1963; died 2002)
- Children: 1

Betsy Blair (born Elizabeth Winifred Boger; December 11, 1923 – March 13, 2009) was an American actress of film and stage, long based in London.

Blair pursued a career in entertainment from the age of eight, and as a child worked as an amateur dancer, performed on radio, and worked as a model, before joining the chorus of Billy Rose's Diamond Horseshoe in 1940. There she met Gene Kelly; they were married the following year, when she was age 17 and divorced sixteen years later in 1957.

After work in the theatre, Blair began her film career playing supporting roles in films such as A Double Life (1947) and Another Part of the Forest (1948). Her communist sympathies led to an investigation by the House Un-American Activities Committee, and Blair was blacklisted for some time, but resumed her career with a critically acclaimed performance in Marty (1955), for which she was nominated for an Academy Award for Best Supporting Actress.

She continued her career with regular theatre, film and television work, mainly in Europe, until the mid-1990s.

== Early life and education ==
Blair was born in Cliffside Park, New Jersey. Her father, William Kidd Boger, was a partner in a small insurance brokerage firm; her mother, Frederica Ammon, was a schoolteacher. Both were Episcopalians. At the age of eight, she was enrolled in the Swift Sisters School of Dance, and recalled performing before Eleanor Roosevelt in 1933, winning an amateur contest shortly thereafter, joining a touring amateur show, and performing on local radio, as motivating influences in her desire to pursue a dance career. She joined the John Robert Powers modeling agency and by the age of 12 was in regular demand. She enrolled in the Professional Children's School but, as it was not accredited, her mother returned her to her local school so that she might eventually attend college. She graduated at 15, securing a scholarship to Sarah Lawrence College. However, the board of admission considered her too immature for entry and requested she wait one year.

== Career ==
=== Stage ===
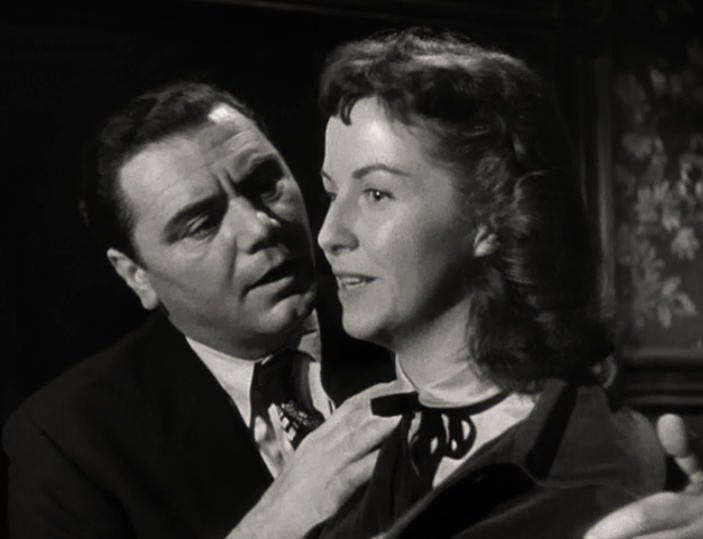
Blair with Borgnine in Marty (1955)

In the interim, Blair joined the chorus at the International Casino in Times Square, and when it closed down, worked in the chorus of Billy Rose's Diamond Horseshoe from January 1940 where Gene Kelly was working as choreographer. "Gene fought for me. He said I could dance, and he needed some good dancers," she wrote in her autobiography. Blair and Kelly's relationship blossomed, culminating in their marriage the following year in 1941 when Blair was 17 years old. She and Kelly remained married for 16 years and had one daughter, Kerry Kelly Novick (b. 1942), together before divorcing in 1957.

Blair left Rose's show to accept an offer from choreographer Robert Alton to join the chorus of Panama Hattie, an illustrious line-up which included June Allyson, Doris and Constance Dowling, and Vera-Ellen. Alton—who previously discovered Gene Kelly—had spotted her when she unsuccessfully auditioned for a part in Louisiana Purchase. During this period, she developed a strong interest in Marxism, having been introduced to Lloyd Gough by Kelly, and attended Gough's weekly Marxist study group, which Kelly did not attend. "And it was very serious. Our textbook was The History of the Communist Party of the Soviet Union... I was completely enthralled by the ideas."

In early 1941, Blair secured her first role in a stage play when Kelly's friend William Saroyan chose her to play the female lead role of St. Agnes of the Mice in his play The Beautiful People at the Lyceum Theatre, playing opposite Eugene Loring, and securing excellent reviews from leading critics George Jean Nathan and Richard Watts, Jr. Watts stated, "The gently sweetly sincere and completely moving gravity and innocence of Miss Blair's utterly right performance is so infinitely touching and beautiful than any studied portrayal could be, that her contribution to the work is gracefully enchanting."

In 1945, she understudied the role of Laura Wingfield, played by Julie Haydon, in the original Broadway production of The Glass Menagerie, starring Laurette Taylor.

=== Film ===
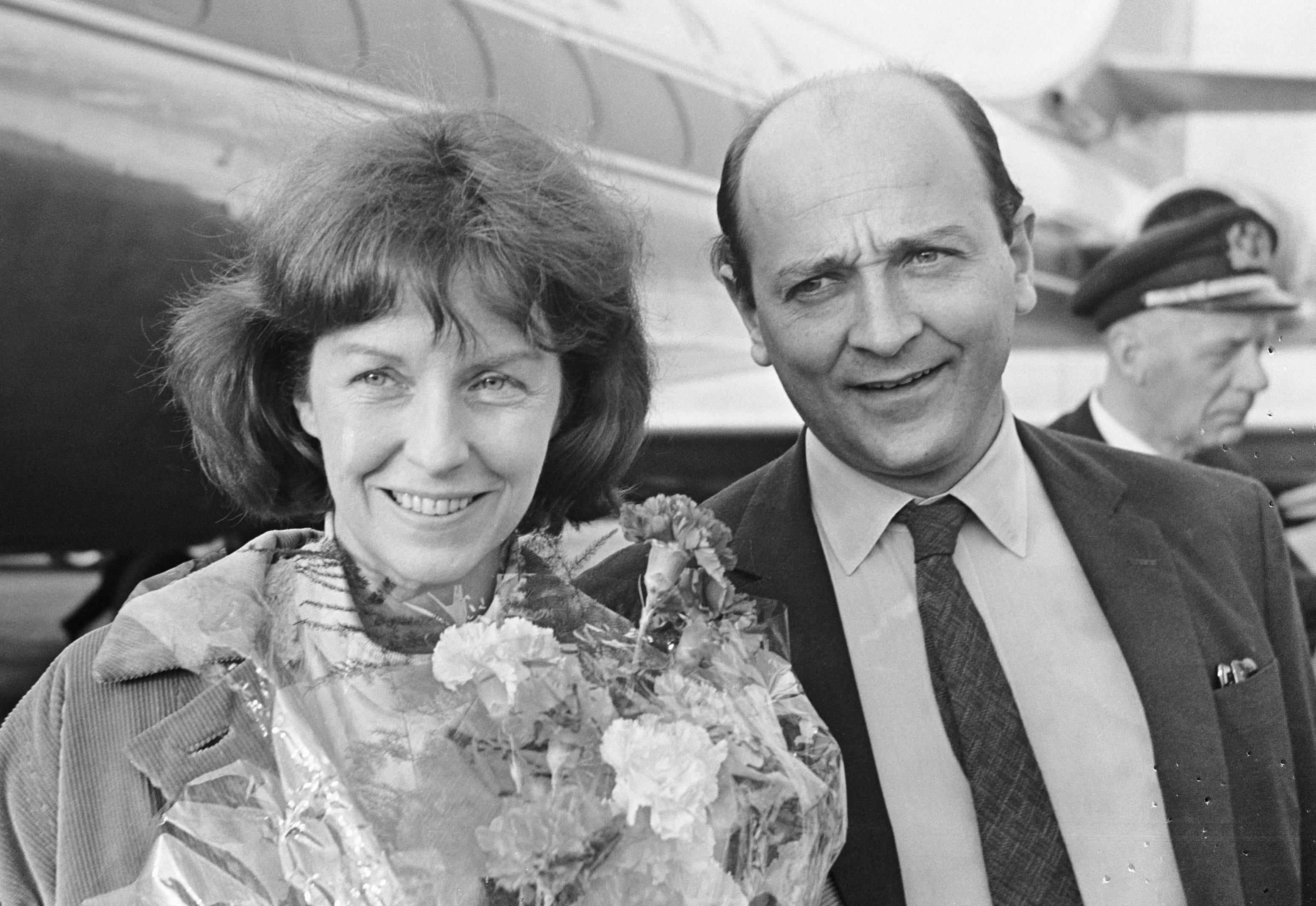
Blair with her husband Karel Reisz in 1966

Blair was featured in such films as A Double Life (1947), Another Part of the Forest (1948), and The Snake Pit (1948). She continued to hold left-wing political views and admittedly attempted to join the Communist Party. In her autobiography, she revealed her application was rejected because the party felt she would be more valuable as the wife of the progressive Kelly. Kelly himself was not a Communist and his status as a valuable star provided the couple some protection. Blair was able to retain her role in Kind Lady (1951) because MGM was unwilling to harm Kelly's image. However, she next became persona no grata at MGM for four years.

In the 1950s, Blair was under investigation from HUAC and blacklisted for several years. She almost lost one of her signature roles, that of Marty's girlfriend in Marty (1955), but was restored to the role after Kelly threatened to pull out of It's Always Fair Weather. For her performance, she received an Academy Award nomination for Best Supporting Actress and prizes from the Cannes Film Festival. Her film career, nonetheless, was damaged during the "red scare" era and she had to seek work on stage in New York and in Europe.

Following her divorce from Kelly, Blair moved permanently to Europe where she paired with French actor and director Roger Pigaut, and continued to appear in films, including Juan Antonio Bardem's Calle Mayor (1956) and Michelangelo Antonioni's Il Grido (1957). By these years, she self-confessedly became a conspicuous member of the avant la lettre European gauche caviar.

Blair married Czech-born British director/producer Karel Reisz in 1963 and performed sporadically in later years, working with Costa-Gavras in 1988 on the film Betrayed and on the mini-series Scarlett in 1994. Reisz died in 2002.

In 1980, she was a member of the jury at the 30th Berlin International Film Festival.

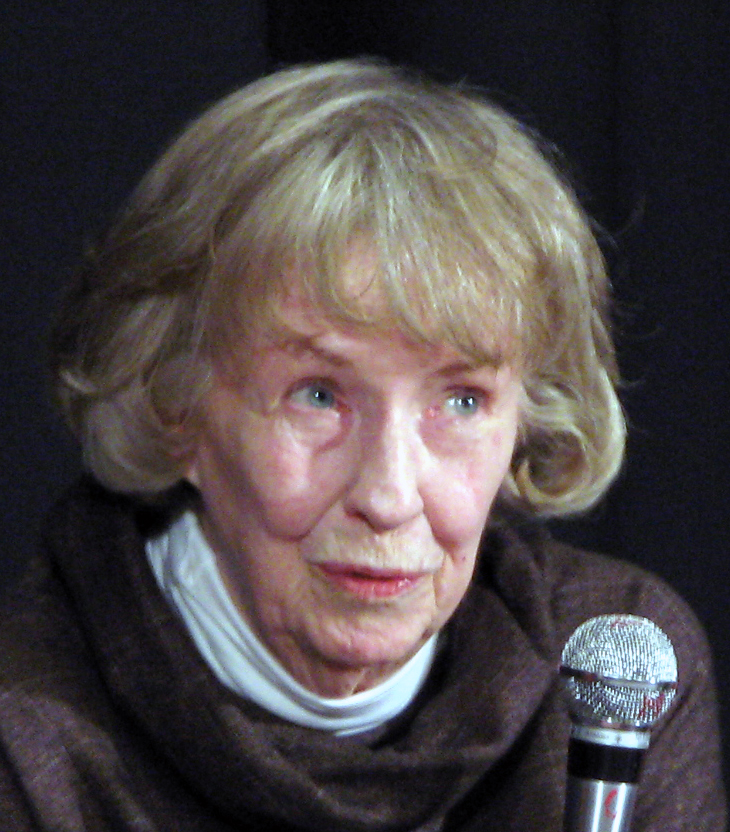
Blair in 2007

Blair filmed scenes for Stephen Daldry's The Hours (2002), initially playing the older version of Julianne Moore's character. It is unclear if she was dropped or if she withdrew from the project. In 2003, she published her autobiography The Memory of All That.

== Death ==
Blair died of cancer in London on March 13, 2009. She was survived by a daughter, Kerry Kelly Novick, three stepsons and several grandchildren.

== Filmography ==
=== Features ===
Year	Title	Role	Notes
1947	The Guilt of Janet Ames	Katie	
1947	A Double Life	Girl in Wig Shop	
1948	Another Part of the Forest	Birdie Bagtry	
1948	The Snake Pit	Hester	
1950	Mystery Street	Jackie Elcott	
1950	No Way Out	Telephone Operator	Uncredited
1951	Kind Lady	Ada Elcott	
1955	Marty	Clara	
1956	Meeting in Paris	Nancy Blanding	
1956	Calle Mayor	Isabel	
1957	The Halliday Brand	Martha Halliday	
1957	Il Grido	Elvia	
1960	Lies My Father Told Me	Mother	
1960	Silver Spoon Set	Countess Margherita Cherè	
1962	All Night Long	Emily	
1962	Careless	Amalia Brentani	
1968	Marry Me! Marry Me!	Second English Teacher	
1973	A Delicate Balance	Edna	
1986	Flight of the Spruce Goose	Helen	
1986	Descente aux enfers	Mrs. Burns	
1988	Betrayed	Gladys Simmons	Final film role

== Awards and nominations ==
Year	Organization	Work	Category	Result	Ref.
1956	Academy Awards	Marty	Best Supporting Actress	Nominated	
1956	British Academy of Film and Television Arts	Marty	Best Foreign Actress	Won	
2006	Chicago International Film Festival	—N/a	Career Achievement Award	Won	

== Bibliography ==
- Blair, Betsy (2003). The Memory of All That. Knopf. ISBN 9780375412998., London: Elliott & Thompson. ISBN 190402730X
