= Tim Seely =

English actor (1935–2024)

- Born: 10 June 1935; England
- Died: 18 May 2024 (aged 88)
- Education: Royal Academy of Dramatic Art
- Occupation: Actor
- Years active: 1957–2006
- Parents: Major Frank Seely; Vera Birkin
- Relatives: Freda Dudley Ward (maternal aunt); Sir Charles Seely, 1st Baronet (great-grandfather); Sir Thomas Birkin, 1st Baronet (great-grandfather)

Timothy Ward Seely (10 June 1935 – 18 May 2024) was an English film, radio, television and theatre actor.

== Background ==
Seely was the son of the late Major Frank James Wriothesley Seely (1901–1956), and a great-grandson of Sir Charles Seely, 1st Baronet. His mother was Vera Lilian Birkin, daughter of British Colonel Charles Wilfred Birkin (fourth son of a lace embroidery and tableware magnate of Nottingham, Sir Thomas Isaac Birkin) and his American wife, Claire Lloyd Birkin (née Howe). His aunt was Freda Dudley Ward, a mistress of King Edward VIII and wife of William Dudley Ward.

Seely studied at London's Royal Academy of Dramatic Art.

== Career ==
In 1957, he made his theatre debut in the play Tea and Sympathy at the London Comedy Theatre. Seely played the young Tom Lee, who fell in love with the senior Laura, played by Elizabeth Sellars. He played the same role in the adaptation at New Shakespeare Theatre, Liverpool. There he also played Rodolfo in Arthur Miller's A View From the Bridge. In 1958, he acted alongside Maggie Smith at the London St Martin's Theatre in an adaptation of The Stepmother.

Seely was member of the BBC Radio Drama Company, with which he acted the title role in Pericles, Prince of Tyre. He also had roles in various Shakespeare plays, including as Baptista in The Taming of the Shrew, Capulet in Romeo and Juliet, Polonius in Hamlet, Leonato in Much Ado About Nothing and the King of France in All's Well That Ends Well.

In the late 1950s, he also took roles in film and television productions. One of his more prominent roles was as Midshipmen Ned Young in the 1962 version of Mutiny on the Bounty, where Seely appeared alongside Marlon Brando and Trevor Howard.

== Death ==
Seely died on 18 May 2024, aged 88.

== Filmography and television work ==
- 1958: Sally's Irish Rogue – Luke Carey
- 1958–1960: Armchair Theatre (television series, three episodes) – Albert Strachan / Seamus MacGonigal / Ralph
- 1959: The Offshore Island (TV Movie) – James Verney
- 1960: Please Turn Over – Robert Hughes
- 1960: The Mystery of Edwin Drood (television series, five episodes) – Edwin Drood
- 1962: Mutiny on the Bounty – Midshipman Edward 'Ned' Young
- 1963: The Human Jungle – Lieutenant Grey
- 1964: Murder Most Foul - Defendant Harold Taylor
- 1979: Agatha – Capt. Rankin
- 1979–1981: Play for Today (television series, three episodes) – Andrew Oliphant, Father / Major / Captain Jennings
- 1980: Lady Killers (television series, one episode) – L. Forbes Winslow
- 1985: Laughterhouse – Landowner
- 1985: Plenty – Sir Charles Curry
- 1990: Strike It Rich – Arnold
- 1991: King Ralph – King of England
- 1993: Lipstick on Your Collar (television series, two episodes) – Brigadier
- 1995: Annie: A Royal Adventure! (TV Movie) – The King
- 2004: Vanity Fair – Doctor
- 2006: Tess: A Tale of Love and Darkness (Short) – Old Man (final film role)

== See also ==
- List of British actors
- List of Royal Academy of Dramatic Art alumni
