= Lies My Father Told Me =

Lies My Father Told Me could refer to:

- Lies My Father Told Me (1960 film)
- Lies My Father Told Me (1975 film)
- Episode of Roseanne
