= Sally's Irish Rogue =

- Original theatrical poster
- Directed by: George Pollock
- Screenplay by: Patrick Kirwan; Blanaid Irvine
- Based on: play The New Gossoon by George Shiels
- Produced by: Robert S. Baker; Monty Berman
- Starring: Julie Harris; Tim Seely
- Cinematography: Stan Pavey
- Edited by: Gerry Hambling
- Music by: Ivor Slaney
- Production company: Emmet Dalton Productions
- Distributed by: British Lion Film Corporation (UK)
- Release dates: 18 November 1958 (London, England)
- Running time: 74 minutes
- Country: Ireland
- Language: English

Sally's Irish Rogue (U.S. title: The Poacher's Daughter) is a 1958 Irish comedy film directed by George Pollock and starring Julie Harris, Harry Brogan and Tim Seely. The screenplay was by Patrick Kirwan and Blanaid Irvine based on the 1930 play The New Gossoon by George Shiels.

== Plot ==
The film depicts the adventures of an Irish poacher.

== Cast ==
- Julie Harris as Sally Hamil
- Harry Brogan as Rabit Hamil
- Tim Seely as Luke Carey
- Marie Kean as Ellen Carey
- Brid Lynch as Mag Kehoe
- Eddie Golden as Ned Shay
- Philip O'Flynn as 'Mad' Henly
- Finnuala O'Shannon as Biddy Henly
- Noel Magee as Seamus Doyle
- Paul Farrell as pub landlord
- Dermot Kelly as McKeefry
- Geoffrey Golden as uncle Peter
- John Hoey as postman
- John Cowley as garage dealer

== Production ==
Filming took place at Ardmore Studios in Dublin. It was the first feature made at Ardmore to be released.

== Reception ==
The Monthly Film Bulletin wrote: "This film is to be recommended for its unaffected humour and charming simplicity. The leading actors are given strong support by the Abbey Players, whose timing is excellent and verve unfailing. Tim Seely, slightly miscast, does not quite seem to have found the right mood for the wayward young rebel, but Julie Harris gives a simple and direct performance which has the right rustic gaiety and energetic humour. It is Harry Brogan, however, as the wily old poacher, who steals the picture and whose playing helps to conceal some weaknesses in direction and screenplay."

Variety wrote: "Irish film comedy is in a specialized class, either leaving an audience cold or in raptures. With the Dublin Abbey Players on parade, Sally's Irish Rogue has an authenticity which makes its naivete and whimsey quute disarming. It emerges as a pleasant, modest joke which creates plenty of happy-go-lucky yocks and should prove a useful dualer for most houses."
