= May Craig (actress) =

Irish actress (1889–1972)

- Born: née Mary Josephine Craig 1889
- Died: 8 February 1972 (aged 82–83); Dublin, Ireland
- Occupation: Actress

May Craig (1889–1972) was an Irish actress. She was born in Dublin.

== Life and Career ==
Mary Josephine Craig was born in 1889 in Dublin, Ireland.[^]

She was first listed as May Craig in 1907 in the world premiere of The Playboy of the Western World. She became an actress with the Abbey Theatre from 1916 to 1968. During her professional life with the Abbey Theatre she appeared in many productions which can be seen in the Abbey Theatre archives. May Craig performed on six tours of North America with the Abbey Theatre and has been described as one of Ireland's senior character actresses. She made her American debut in 1932, at the Ambassador Theater, New York. While in New York during 1932-33 she appeared in Autumn Fire, The Big House, King Oedipus, The Well of the Saints and Church Street.

In 1931 she appeared in a play by Irish playwright Teresa Deevy called A Disciple and in 1947 she appeared in In Search of Valour where she played the part of Mrs. Maher. As an actress, May Craig has been seen in movies such as The Rising of the Moon (1957), The Quiet Man (1952), Girl with Green Eyes (1964), Johnny Nobody (1961) and Saintly Sinners (1962).

Craig was married to Vincent Power-Fardy and together they had seven children.[8]

She died on 8 February 1972 in Dublin, Ireland. She is buried at Glasnevin Cemetery.

== Selected filmography ==
- The Quiet Man (1952)
- The Rising of the Moon (1957)
- Johnny Nobody (1961)
- Saintly Sinners (1962)
- Girl with Green Eyes (1964)

== Playography ==
- The Playboy of the Western World (1907)
- A Disciple (1931)
- In Search of Valour (1947)
