= Barbara Cook =

American actress and singer (1927–2017)

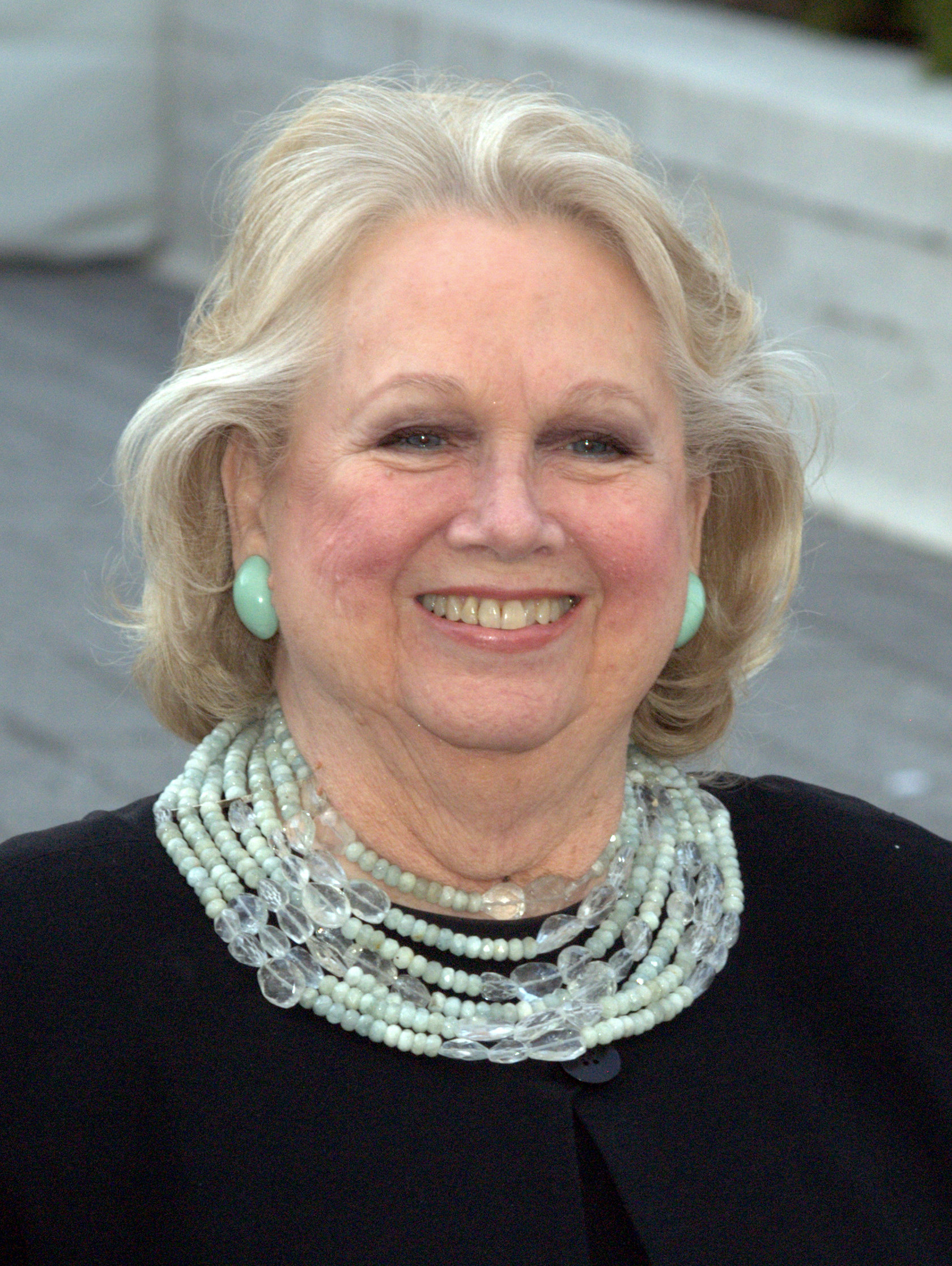
- Cook in 2009
- Born: October 25, 1927; Atlanta, Georgia, U.S.
- Died: August 8, 2017 (aged 89); New York City, U.S.
- Occupations: Actress, singer
- Years active: 1950–2017
- Spouse: David LeGrant (m. 1952; div. 1965)
- Children: 1
- Musical career
- Genres: Musical theatre, traditional pop
- Labels: Urania (1958–1959); Columbia (1975–1977); Moss Music Group (1981–1988); DRG (1993–2017)

Barbara Cook (October 25, 1927 – August 8, 2017) was an American actress and singer who first came to prominence in the 1950s as the lead in the original Broadway musicals Plain and Fancy (1955), Candide (1956) and The Music Man (1957) among others, winning a Tony Award for the last. She continued performing mostly in theatre until the mid-1970s, when she began a second career as a cabaret and concert singer. She also made numerous recordings.

During her years as Broadway’s leading ingénue, Cook was lauded for her excellent lyric soprano voice. She was particularly admired for her vocal agility, wide range, warm sound, and emotive interpretations. As she aged her voice took on a darker quality, even in her head voice, that was less prominent in her youth. At the time of her death, Cook was widely recognized as one of the "premier interpreters" of musical theatre songs and standards, in particular the songs of composer Stephen Sondheim. Her subtle and sensitive interpretations of American popular song continued to earn high praise even into her eighties. She was named an honoree at the 2011 Kennedy Center Honors.

== Early life ==
Cook was born in Atlanta, the daughter of Nell (née Harwell) and Charles Bunyan Cook. Her father was a traveling hat salesman and her mother was an operator for Southern Bell. Her parents divorced when she was a child and, after her only sister died of whooping cough, Barbara lived alone with her mother. She later described their relationship as "so close, too close. I slept with my mother until I came to New York. Slept in the same bed with her. That's just, it's wrong. But to me, it was the norm....As far as she was concerned, we were one person." Though Barbara began singing at an early age, at the Elks Club and to her father over the phone, she spent three years after graduating from high school working as a typist.

== Career ==
=== Early career ===
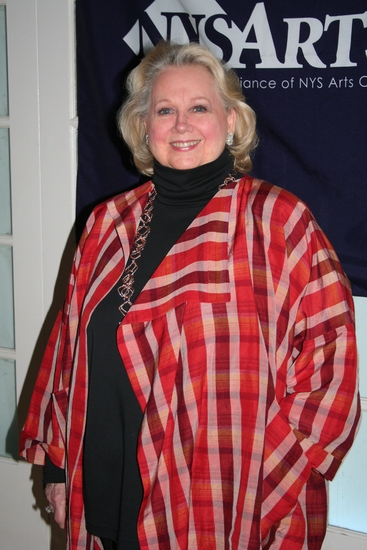
Cook in December 2008

In 1947 Cook was engaged as a featured performer for Atlanta's Southeastern Fair at the Lakewood Fairgrounds. While visiting Manhattan in 1948 with her mother, she decided to stay and try to find work as an actress. In 1949 she performed in a touring vaudeville act entitled "A Toast To Rodgers and Hammerstein" which was organized by pianist Erwin Strauss, the son of the composer Oscar Straus. Beginning in Boston, the act performed mainly at hotels and venues owned by Ernie Byfield in cities like New York and Chicago. She began to sing at other clubs and resorts, eventually procuring an engagement at the Blue Angel club in Manhattan in 1950.

Cook made her Broadway debut as Sandy in the short-lived 1951 musical Flahooley. She landed another role quickly, portraying Ado Annie in the 1951 City Center revival of Rodgers and Hammerstein's Oklahoma!, and stayed with the production when it went on its national tour the following year.

Also in 1952, Cook made her first television appearance on the show Armstrong Circle Theatre which presented her in an original play entitled Mr. Bemiss Takes a Trip. In 1954, Cook appeared in the short-lived soap opera Golden Windows and starred as Jane Piper in a television version of Victor Herbert's operetta Babes in Toyland. That summer, she returned to City Center to portray Carrie Pipperidge in a revival of Rodgers and Hammerstein's Carousel, which Cook described as "the first time the critics really paid attention to me. It was like I was the new young thing. It was very important for me."

In 1955, she received major critical praise for playing the supporting role of Hilda Miller in Plain and Fancy. Walter Kerr wrote of her performance: "Barbara Cook, right off a blue and white Dutch plate, is delicious all the time, but especially when she perches on a trunk, savors her first worthwhile kiss, and melts into the melody of 'This Is All Very New to Me'." Cook's critical reputation and coloratura soprano range won her the role of Cunegonde in Leonard Bernstein's 1956 operetta Candide, in which she sang the vocally demanding, show-stopping comic aria "Glitter and Be Gay".

Although Candide was not a commercial success, Cook's portrayal of Cunegonde established her as one of Broadway's leading ingenues. In 1957 she appeared in a second City Center revival of Carousel, this time in the role of Julie Jordan, and won a Tony Award for creating the role of Marian the Librarian in Meredith Willson's 1957 hit The Music Man. Cook continued to appear regularly on television in the late 1950s, starring in a 1956 Producers' Showcase production of Bloomer Girl, a 1957 live broadcast of The Yeomen of the Guard, and a 1958 musical adaptation of Hansel and Gretel. She also made appearances on Alfred Hitchcock Presents, The Ed Sullivan Show, The Dinah Shore Chevy Show, and The Play of the Week.

Cook starred in an acclaimed 1960 City Center revival of Rodgers and Hammerstein's The King and I and in the short-lived 1961 musical The Gay Life. In 1963, she created the role of Amalia Balash in the classic Jerry Bock-Sheldon Harnick musical She Loves Me. Her performance prompted Norman Nadel of the World-Telegram & Sun to write, "Her clear soprano is not only one of the finest vocal instruments in the contemporary musical theatre, but it conveys all the vitality, brightness and strength of her feminine young personality, which is plenty." A number from She Loves Me, "Ice Cream", became one of Cook's signature songs.

In the mid-1960s, Cook began working less frequently. She appeared in the 1964 flop Something More!, which ran for only 15 performances on Broadway, and tried her hand at non-musical roles, replacing Sandy Dennis in the play Any Wednesday in 1965 and originating the role of Patsy Newquist in Jules Feiffer's 1967 play Little Murders. She starred in national tours of The Unsinkable Molly Brown in 1964 and Funny Girl in 1967. Her last original "book" musical role on Broadway came in 1971 when she played Dolly Talbo in The Grass Harp. In 1972, Cook returned to the dramatic stage in the Repertory Theater of Lincoln Center's production of Maxim Gorky's Enemies.

=== 1970s to 2004 ===
As she began struggling with depression, obesity, and alcoholism in the Seventies (she would quit drinking in 1977), Cook had trouble getting stage work. In the mid-1970s Cook's fortunes changed for the better when she met and befriended composer and pianist Wally Harper. Harper convinced her to put together a concert and on January 26, 1975, accompanied by Harper, she made her debut in a solo concert at Carnegie Hall that resulted in a legendary concert and live album. Continuing a collaboration with Harper that lasted until his death in 2004, over the next three decades, Barbara Cook became a successful concert performer and Cook and Harper performed together at not only many of the best cabaret spots and music halls in New York City — like Michael's Pub and the St. Regis Hotel — but nationally and internationally. Cook and Harper returned to Carnegie Hall in September 1980, to perform a series of songs arranged by Harper. The New York Times' reviewer, John S. Wilson, wrote: "Since her first Carnegie Hall appearance, she has grown from a delightful singer to become a delightful entertainer who also happens to be a remarkable singer." The latter performance was captured on the CD It's Better With a Band.

In 1986, Cook was nominated for an Olivier Award "The Observer Award for Outstanding Achievement" for her one-woman show, accompanied by Harper, at London's Donmar Warehouse and the Albery Theatre. She won the Drama Desk Award "Outstanding One Person Show" in 1987 for her Broadway show A Concert for the Theatre, again with Harper. In October 1991, they appeared as featured artists at the Carnegie Hall Gala Music and Remembrance: A Celebration of Great Musical Partnerships which raised money for the advancement of the performing arts and for AIDS research. In 1994, they performed a critically acclaimed concert series at the Sadler's Wells Theatre in London, which was recorded by DRG as Live From London. "Cook still comes across with consummate taste and with a voice that shows little sign of wear after 40 years." Alastair Macaulay wrote in the Financial Times about the concert, "Barbara Cook is the greatest singer in the world ... Ms. Cook is the only popular singer active today who should be taken seriously by lovers of classical music. Has any singer since Callas matched Cook's sense of musical architecture? I doubt it." The performing duo traveled all over the world giving concerts together including a number of times at the White House – for Presidents Carter, Reagan, Bush, and Clinton.

From the mid-1970s on, Cook returned only sporadically to acting, mostly in occasional studio cast and live concert versions of stage musicals. In September 1985 she appeared with the New York Philharmonic as Sally in the renowned concert version of Stephen Sondheim's Follies. In 1986, she recorded the role of Martha in the Sharon Burgett musical version of The Secret Garden along with John Cullum, Judy Kaye, and George Rose. In 1987 she performed the role of Julie Jordan in a concert version of Rodgers and Hammerstein's Carousel with Samuel Ramey as Billy, Sarah Brightman as Carrie, and the Royal Philharmonic Orchestra, and she won the Drama Desk Award for Outstanding One-Person Show for A Concert for the Theatre. In 1988, she originated the role of Margaret White in the ill-fated musical version of Stephen King's Carrie, which premiered in England and was presented by the Royal Shakespeare Company. In May of 1990, she was the featured soloist in a program of theatre music given by the Oratorio Society of New York. In 1994, she provided both her acting and singing skills to the animated film version of Thumbelina, as Thumbelina's mother which featured music by Barry Manilow. That same year she was inducted into the American Theatre Hall of Fame.

In November 1997, Cook celebrated her 70th birthday by giving a concert at Albert Hall in London with the Royal Philharmonic Orchestra, joined by performers including Elaine Stritch and Maria Friedman. The Times reviewer noted: "The world is usually divided into actresses who try to sing and singers who try to act. Cook is one of the few performers who manage to combine the best of both traditions, as she reminded us in 'It Might as Well be Spring' – and, at the close, in her encore of Bock and Harnick's 'Ice Cream'."

In 2000, she was one of the only American performers chosen to perform at the Sydney 2000 Olympic Arts Festival in the Sydney Opera House. Also in 2000, she was joined by Lillias White, Malcolm Gets, and Debbie Gravitte on the studio cast recording of Jimmy McHugh's Lucky in the Rain.

In February 2001, Cook returned to Carnegie Hall to perform Barbara Cook Sings Mostly Sondheim which was recorded live and released on CD. Critically acclaimed from the start, Cook then took the concert to the West End Lyric Theatre in 2001. She garnered two Olivier Award nominations for Best Entertainment and Best Actress in a Musical for the concert. She went on to perform Sings Mostly Sondheim at Lincoln Center for a sold-out fourteen-week run from December 2001 to January 2002, and again in June 2002 to August 2002. She was nominated for a Tony Award for Best Theatrical Event. She took the show on a National tour throughout major cities in the United States. DRG filmed the stage production during a performance at the Pepsico Theatre, SUNY Purchase, New York, on October 11, 2002 and it was released on DVD on the DRG/Koch Entertainment label. In June and August 2002 Cook performed Sings Mostly Sondheim at the Terrace Theater, Kennedy Center as part of the Sondheim Celebration.

In 2004 she performed two limited engagement concert series at the Vivian Beaumont and Mitzi Newhouse theaters at Lincoln Center, "Barbara Cook's Broadway!", with Harper as her musical director/arranger. She received the New York Drama Critics Circle Award ("for her contribution to the musical theater") and a nomination for the Drama Desk Award, Outstanding Solo Performance. A recording of the concert was made.

=== Later years ===
After Wally Harper's death in October 2004, Cook made adjustments to new accompanists in solo shows like Tribute (a reference to Harper) and No One Is Alone that continued to receive acclaim; The New York Times wrote in 2005 that she was "at the top of her game.... Cook's voice is remarkably unchanged from 1958, when she won the Tony Award for playing Marian the Librarian in The Music Man. A few high notes aside, it is, eerily, as rich and clear as ever." In January 2006, Cook became the first female pop singer to be presented by the Metropolitan Opera in the company's more than one hundred-year history. She presented a solo concert of Broadway show tunes and classic jazz standards, and was supported on a few numbers by guest singers Audra McDonald and Josh Groban and Elaine Stritch (although Stritch did not appear on the CD of the concert). The concert was recorded and subsequently released on CD. On June 25, 2006, Cook was the special guest star of the Award Winning Gay Men's Chorus of Washington, D.C., celebrating GMCW's Silver Anniversary in a performance at the Kennedy Center in Washington DC.

Cook was the featured artist at the Arts! by George gala on September 29, 2007 at the Fairfax campus of George Mason University. On October 22, 2007, Cook sang at the Broward Center for the Performing Arts with the Fort Lauderdale Gay Men's Chorus in the chorus's concert entitled "An Evening With Barbara Cook". Upon completion of the concert, an almost full house greeted her with a round of "Happy Birthday" in honor of her impending 80th birthday, which, on December 2, 2007, she celebrated belatedly in the UK with a concert at the Coliseum Theatre in London's West End.

As she entered her ninth decade, Cook performed in two sold-out concerts with the New York Philharmonic at Lincoln Center in 2007. The New York Times Stephen Holden wrote that Cook is "a performer spreading the gospel of simplicity, self-reliance and truth" who is "never glib" and summoning adjectives such as "astonishing" and "transcendent", concluding that she sings with "a tenderness and honesty that could break your heart and mend it all at once."

In June 2008, Cook appeared in Strictly Gershwin at the Royal Albert Hall in London, England, with the full company of English National Ballet. An advertised appearance with the Ulster Orchestra as the Closing Concert of the Ulster Bank Belfast Festival at Queen's at the Waterfront Hall in Belfast on October 31, 2008 was cancelled due to scheduling difficulties. Her other 2008 appearances included concerts in Chicago and San Francisco.

In 2009, she performed with the Princeton Symphony, Detroit Symphony, and gave concerts in Boca Raton, Florida, and at the McCarter Theatre in Princeton. She performed in a cabaret show at Feinsteins at the Regency (New York City) which opened in April 2009.

Cook returned to Broadway in 2010 in the Roundabout Theatre's Stephen Sondheim revue Sondheim on Sondheim, created and directed by long-time Sondheim collaborator James Lapine, at Studio 54. She starred opposite Vanessa L. Williams, Norm Lewis and Tom Wopat. Cook was nominated for a Tony Award for her performance in the category of Best Performance by a Featured Actress in a Musical. On April 12, 2011, Cook appeared with James Taylor, Bette Midler and Sting, at Carnegie Hall for a gala called "Celebrating 120 Years of Carnegie Hall".

Cook was named an honoree at the 2011 Kennedy Center Honors, held on December 4, 2011 (the ceremony was broadcast on CBS on December 27, 2011). Performers paying tribute to Cook on that occasion included Matthew Broderick, Sarah Jessica Parker, Patti LuPone, Glenn Close, Kelli O'Hara, Rebecca Luker, Sutton Foster, Laura Osnes, Anna Christy, and Audra McDonald.

In 2016, Cook published her autobiography Then & Now: A Memoir with collaborator Tom Santopietro. She announced her retirement in May 2017.

== Personal life ==
Cook married acting teacher David LeGrant (December 8, 1923 – July 28, 2011) on March 9, 1952, after meeting at a resort on the Borscht Belt. They performed together in a national stage tour of Oklahoma in 1953. The couple had one child, Adam, born in 1959. They divorced in 1965.

=== Death ===
Cook died from respiratory failure at her home in Manhattan on August 8, 2017, at age 89. The marquee lights of the Broadway theaters were dimmed for one minute in tribute to Cook on August 9. Cook's friend and fellow musical theater actress Elaine Paige paid tribute to Cook during her BBC Radio 2 show Elaine Paige on Sunday on August 13.

== Discography ==
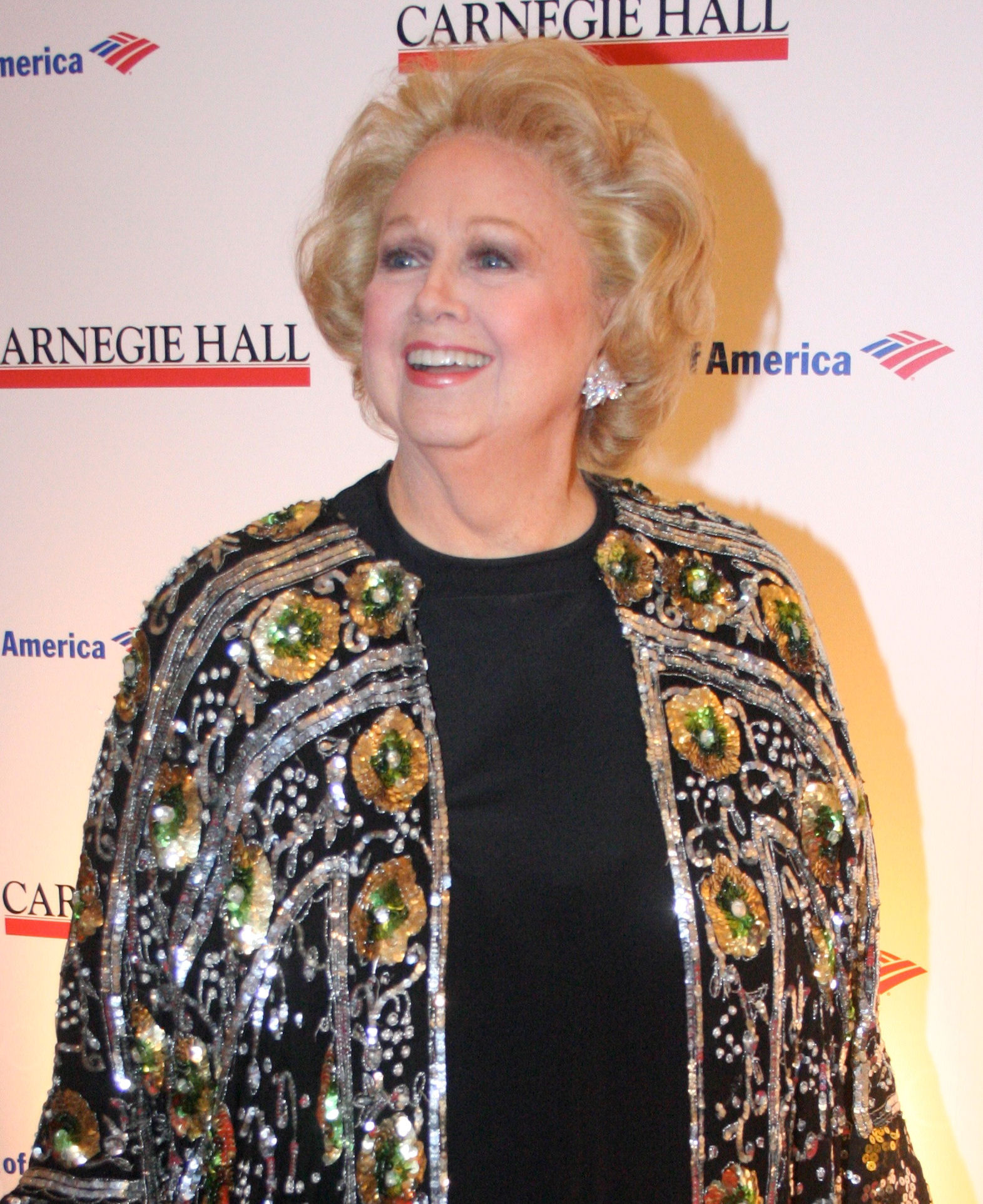
Cook in April 2011

Solo

- Songs of Perfect Propriety (1958)
- Barbara Cook Sings "From the Heart" – [The Best of Rodgers & Hart] (1959)
- At Carnegie Hall (1975)
- As Of Today (1977)
- It's Better With a Band (1981)
- The Disney Album (1988)
- Dorothy Fields: Close as Pages in a Book (1993)
- Live from London (1994)
- Oscar Winners: The Lyrics of Oscar Hammerstein II (1997)
- All I Ask of You (1999)
- The Champion Season: A Salute to Gower Champion (1999)
- Have Yourself a Merry Little Christmas (2000) [CITE?] [LABEL?]
- Sings Mostly Sondheim: Live at Carnegie Hall (2001)
- Count Your Blessings (2003)—Grammy Award nominee (Best Traditional Pop Vocal Album)
- Barbara Cook's Broadway! (2004)
- Tribute (2005)
- Barbara Cook at The Met (2006)
- No One Is Alone (2007)
- Rainbow Round My Shoulder (2008)
- Cheek to Cheek: Live from Feinstein's at Loews Regency (Barbara Cook & Michael Feinstein) (2011)
- You Make Me Feel So Young: Live at Feinstein's at the Loews Regency (2011)
- Loverman (2012)

Cast and studio cast recordings

- Flahooley (1951)
- Plain and Fancy (1955)
- Candide (1956)
- The Music Man (1957)—Grammy Award winner (Best Original Cast Album)
- Hansel and Gretel (Television Soundtrack, 1958)
- The Gay Life (1961)
- Show Boat (Studio Cast, 1962)
- She Loves Me (1963)—Grammy Award winner (Best Score From An Original Cast Show Album)
- The King and I (Studio Cast, 1964) with Theodore Bikel, in new orchestrations by Philip Lang 1964
- Show Boat (Lincoln Center Cast, 1966)
- The Grass Harp (1971)
- Follies in Concert (1985)
- The Secret Garden (World Premiere Recording, 1986)
- Carousel (Studio Cast, 1987)
- Thumbelina (Motion Picture Soundtrack, 1994)
- Lucky in the Rain (2000)
- Sondheim on Sondheim (2010)

Compilations

- The Broadway Years: Till There Was You (1995)
- Legends of Broadway—Barbara Cook (2006)
- The Essential Barbara Cook Collection (2009)

== Stage work ==
- Flahooley (1951)
- Oklahoma! (1953)
- Carousel (1954)
- Plain and Fancy (1955)
- Candide (1956)
- Carousel (1957)
- The Music Man (1957)
- The King and I (1960)
- The Gay Life (1961)
- Fanny (1962)
- She Loves Me (1963)
- Something More! (1964)
- The Unsinkable Molly Brown (1964)
- Any Wednesday (1965) (replacement for Sandy Dennis)
- Show Boat (1966)
- Little Murders (1967)
- Funny Girl (1967)
- The Grass Harp (1971)
- Halloween (1972)
- Enemies (1972)
- Follies (1985) (Lincoln Center)
- Barbara Cook: Wait Till You See Her (1986)
- Barbara Cook: A Concert for the Theater (1987)
- Carrie (1988)
- The King and I (1996)
- Mostly Sondheim (2002)
- Something Good: A Broadway Salute to Richard Rodgers on His 100th Birthday (2002)
- Barbara Cook's Broadway (2004)
- Sondheim on Sondheim (2010)

== Television ==
- Armstrong Circle Theatre (S2, Epd 24), ("Mr. Bemiss Takes a Trip"), NBC (broadcast February 26, 1952
- Golden Windows (NBC soap opera, 1954)
- Ed Sullivan Show (A Salute to Rodgers & Hammerstein)(Cook sings "Many A New Day" from OKLAHOMA!) broadcast March 27, 1955)
- Babes in Toyland, TV special NBC, broadcast December 24, 1955
- Bloomer Girl (selections) (Producers' Showcase, NBC, broadcast May 28, 1956) with Keith Andes, James Mitchell
- Alfred Hitchcock Presents (1957) (Season 2 Episode 38: "A Little Sleep") as Barbie Hallem (with Vic Morrow)
- The Yeomen of the Guard (broadcast April 10, 1957) with Alfred Drake
- Hansel and Gretel (NBC Special, broadcast April 27, 1958) with Red Buttons, Hans Conreid, Sondra Lee
- The Bell Telephone Hour ("The Music Man" excerpts), NBC (broadcast February 26, 1960; one of the earliest TV productions shot in color)
- The Bell Telephone Hour ("A Salute to Vienna", with Alfred Drake), NBC (broadcast March 16, 1962)
- The Bell Telephone Hour ("The American Girl", with Robert Goulet), NBC (broadcast March 2, 1965)
- The Bell Telephone Hour ("A Salute to Veterans' Day", with Anita Gillette), NBC (broadcast November 7, 1965)
- The Mike Douglas Entertainment Hour ("A Salute to Broadway") with John Raitt, February 1981
- The Dick Cavett Show, guest, 1982
- The Jonathan Schwartz Show, guest with Wally Harper, 1984
- 41st Tony Awards Show, 1987, "A Salute to Robert Preston" (Cook sings "'Til There was You"), CBS, June 7, 1987
- Carrie the Musical (Stratford Production), Opening Night, 1988
- Boston Pops, PBS, 1989
- MAC Awards Show, 1994, (Cook sings "Ship in a Bottle")
- Theater Talk, guest (local New York show with Michael Riedel and Susan Haskins) broadcast June 11, 1997
- Theater Talk, guest (discusses "The Music Man"), (local New York show) broadcast April 21, 2000
- 60 Minutes, Interviewed by Mike Wallace, CBS, December 2001
- Master Cabaret Performance Class on Irving Berlin,with students from various Manhattan schools; conducted at and by the Lincoln Center for the Performing Arts Library, February 21, 2006
- 34th Annual Kennedy Center Honors, 2011, "Tribute to Barbara Cook", CBS, December 27, 2011

== Bibliography ==
- Cook, Barbara (2016). Then & Now: A Memoir. Harper Collins. ISBN 978-0-0620-9046-1.
- Winer, Deborah Grace (1995). The Night and the Music: Rosemary Clooney, Barbara Cook, and Julie Wilson Inside the World of Cabaret. Simon & Schuster. ISBN 0-02-872954-4.
