= Lockhart Amerman =

American minister and novelist (1911–1969)

Lockhart Amerman (September 17, 1911 – November 1969) was an American minister and novelist.

Born in New York City in 1911 to William Libbey Amerman and Carrie Lockhart, he attended Collegiate School in New York City and then studied at Haverford College He was editor of The Haverfordian (the campus literary magazine) in 1930. He was associate editor of the 1931 Record (the senior class yearbook). He played on the cricket team for four years at Haverford College.

After graduating from Haverford College in 1931, he attended Princeton Theological Seminary and graduated in 1935, writing a thesis entitled "Markheim's Mirror: A Study of the Pauline Doctrine of Conscious". After ordination as a Presbyterian minister, he served as Assistant Pastor of the Fifth Avenue Presbyterian Church in New York City. Amerman served as pastor of the Sewickley Presbyterian Church in Sewickley, Pennsylvania, near Pittsburgh, from 1939 until 1968.

Amerman was an active scholar as well as a minister. He published Where Saints Have Trod with the Gibson Press in 1943. He published "The Menace of the Sunday School", in The Christian Century, Vol. LXI, No. 6 (February 9, 1944), p. 174 criticizing the simplistic theology often taught in Sunday schools. He also published a book of poems, Wheat for a Penny with Thistle House in 1945. He published “The Pulpit Steps” in Theology Today in 1949. He was awarded the degree of Doctor of Divinity and was on the faculty of what was then known as the Western Theological Seminary (now the Pittsburgh Theological Seminary).

Amerman published several well-received young adult mystery novels about the adventures of Jonathan Flower (a teenage son of an American spy). The first book, Guns in the Heather, was published in 1963. This was followed by Cape Cod Casket in 1964. Amerman finished the trilogy with The Sly One in 1966. Guns in the Heather would go on to be made into a film by Disney (entitled The Secret of Boyne Castle) and released on Walt Disney's Wonderful World of Color in 1969. It was released under the title of “Guns in the Heather” in Europe and in a Spanish translation as "El Secreto del Castillo." It would later be re-broadcast as Spy-Busters on American television in 1978.

== Personal life ==
He married Louise Landreth in Bristol, Pennsylvania in 1940; they had four children. The family would often vacation at a cabin built by his father at Tupper Lake in the Adirondacks.

== Death ==
Lockhart Amerman died in November 1969, at the age of 58.
