= Paul Farrell =

Irish actor (1893–1975)

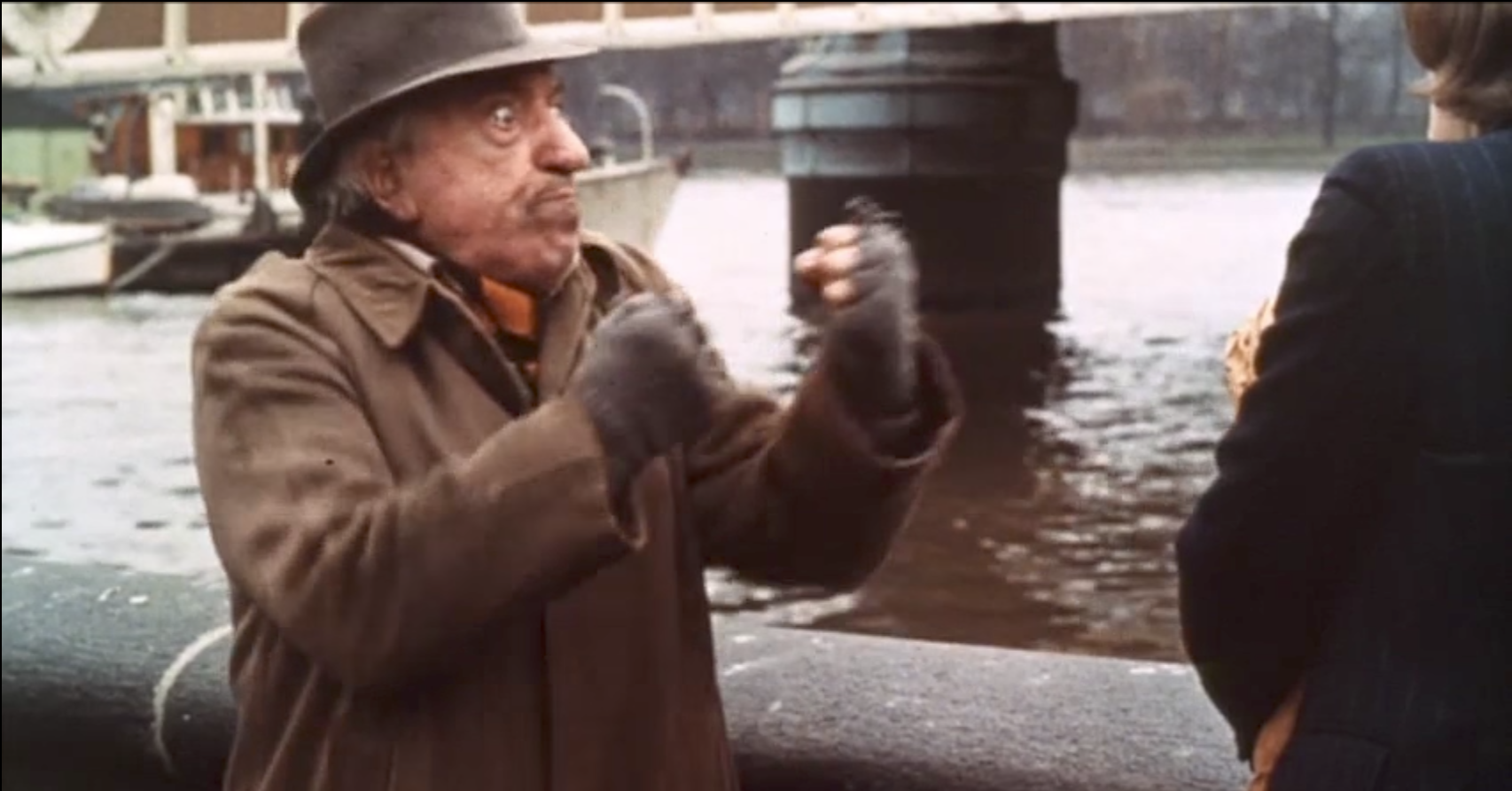
- Farrell in A Clockwork Orange (1971)
- Born: Thomas Paul Farrell; 21 September 1893; Dublin, Ireland
- Died: 12 June 1975 (aged 81); Manchester, England
- Occupation: Actor
- Years active: 1930-1974

Thomas Paul Farrell (21 September 1893 – 12 June 1975) was an Irish film and television actor.

He is best remembered as the "Tramp" who gets beaten up by Alex and his "droogs", in Stanley Kubrick's A Clockwork Orange (1971).

== Filmography ==
Year	Title	Role	Notes
1930	By Accident		
1936	Ourselves Alone	Hogan	
1947	‘’Odd Man Out	Bartender	
1948	My Brother Jonathan	Dr. Lucas	
1955	Captain Lightfoot	The Magistrate	Uncredited
1957	The Rising of the Moon	Jim O'Brien	2nd Episode
1958	She Didn't Say No!	Darmody	
1958	Sally's Irish Rogue	Pub Landlord	
1959	Broth of a Boy	Barman	
1959	Shake Hands with the Devil	Doyle	
1959	Alive and Kicking	Postman	
1959	This Other Eden	McNeely	
1960	The Siege of Sidney Street	Barman in Pub	
1964	Becket	Farmer	Uncredited
1964	Never Put It in Writing		Uncredited
1965	Die, Monster, Die!	Jason	(UK title: Monster of Terror)
1968	Mrs. Brown, You've Got a Lovely Daughter	White City Clerk	
1968	Hot Millions	Larry	Uncredited
1969	Sinful Davey	Bailiff	
1969	Guns in the Heather	Groundskeeper	
1970	Country Dance	Alex-the-Gillie	
1970	The Man Who Had Power Over Women	Reaney's Father	
1971	A Clockwork Orange	Tramp	
