= Broth of a Boy =

1959 Irish film

- Original British quad poster
- Directed by: George Pollock
- Written by: Blanaid Irvine; Patrick Kirwan
- Based on: play The Big Birthday by Hugh Leonard
- Produced by: Emmet Dalton; Alec C. Snowden
- Starring: Barry Fitzgerald; June Thorburn; Eddie Golden; Godfrey Quigley
- Cinematography: Walter J. Harvey
- Edited by: Henry Richardson
- Music by: Stanley Black
- Production company: Emmett Dalton Productions
- Distributed by: British Lion Film Corporation (UK)
- Release date: February 1959 (UK)
- Running time: 77 minutes
- Country: Ireland
- Language: English

Broth of a Boy is a 1959 Irish comedy film directed by George Pollock and starring Barry Fitzgerald (in his final appearance), Harry Brogan and June Thorburn. It was written by Blanaid Irvine and Patrick Kirwan and adapted from the 1956 play The Big Birthday by Hugh Leonard.

The film involves the efforts of a British television producer to create a documentary about the birthday of an Irish supercentenarian, but the cantankerous old man is unwilling to cooperate with him.

== Plot ==
Whilst holidaying in Ireland, British TV producer Randall comes across a village celebrating the birthday of the oldest man in the world, Patrick Farrell. Thinking Farrell's 110th birthday would make an ideal subject for a BBC documentary, Randall seeks to persuade him to agree to be filmed. However, Farrell proves difficult, is an old codger, cantankerous and disreputable, and will cooperate only if he can exploit the situation for his own ends.

== Cast ==
- Barry Fitzgerald as Patrick Farrell
- Harry Brogan as Willie
- Tony Wright as Randall
- June Thorburn as Silin Lehane
- Eddie Golden as Martin Lehane
- Maire Keane as Molly Lehane
- Godfrey Quigley as Desmond Phillips
- Bart Bastable as Clooney
- Dermot Kelly as Tim
- Cecil Barror as O'Shaughnessy
- Josephine Fitzgerald as Mrs. O'Shaughnessy
- Philip O'Flynn as Father Carey
- Dennis Brennan as Bolger
- Bill Foley as Connolly
- Annie D'Alton as Miss O'Toole
- T. P. McKenna as minor role
- Paul Farrell as narman
- Christopher Casson as Judge

== Production ==
Filming took place at Bray Studios in Ireland in August 1958 under the title of The Big Birthday.

== Critical reception ==
The New York Times wrote, "Although the idea bristles with lively possibilities and Mr. Fitzgerald and the Abbey Theatre players who surround him do as much as they can with it, Broth of a Boy only generates mild chuckles and a guffaw or two".

TV Guide bemoaned the "bad script, acting, and direction".

Allmovie applauded "a pleasant, easygoing satire of exploitive journalism – a target that is as viable today as it was in 1959."

Leonard Maltin found the film "quietly effective."

Leslie Halliwell said: "Mildly amusing regional comedy."

In British Sound Films: The Studio Years 1928–1959 David Quinlan rated the film as "average", writing: "Palatable dose of Irish, lent sparkle by Fitzgerald."
