= Harry Brogan =

Irish actor (1904–1977)

- Born: May 5, 1904; Ireland
- Died: 20 May 1977 (aged 73); Dublin, Ireland
- Occupations: Stage and film actor
- Years active: 1939–1977
- Children: 5

Harry Brogan (5 May 1904 – 20 May 1977) was an Irish actor often in comic roles. He was part of the Abbey Theatre from 1939 - 1976.

== 1939–1976: Abbey Theatre ==
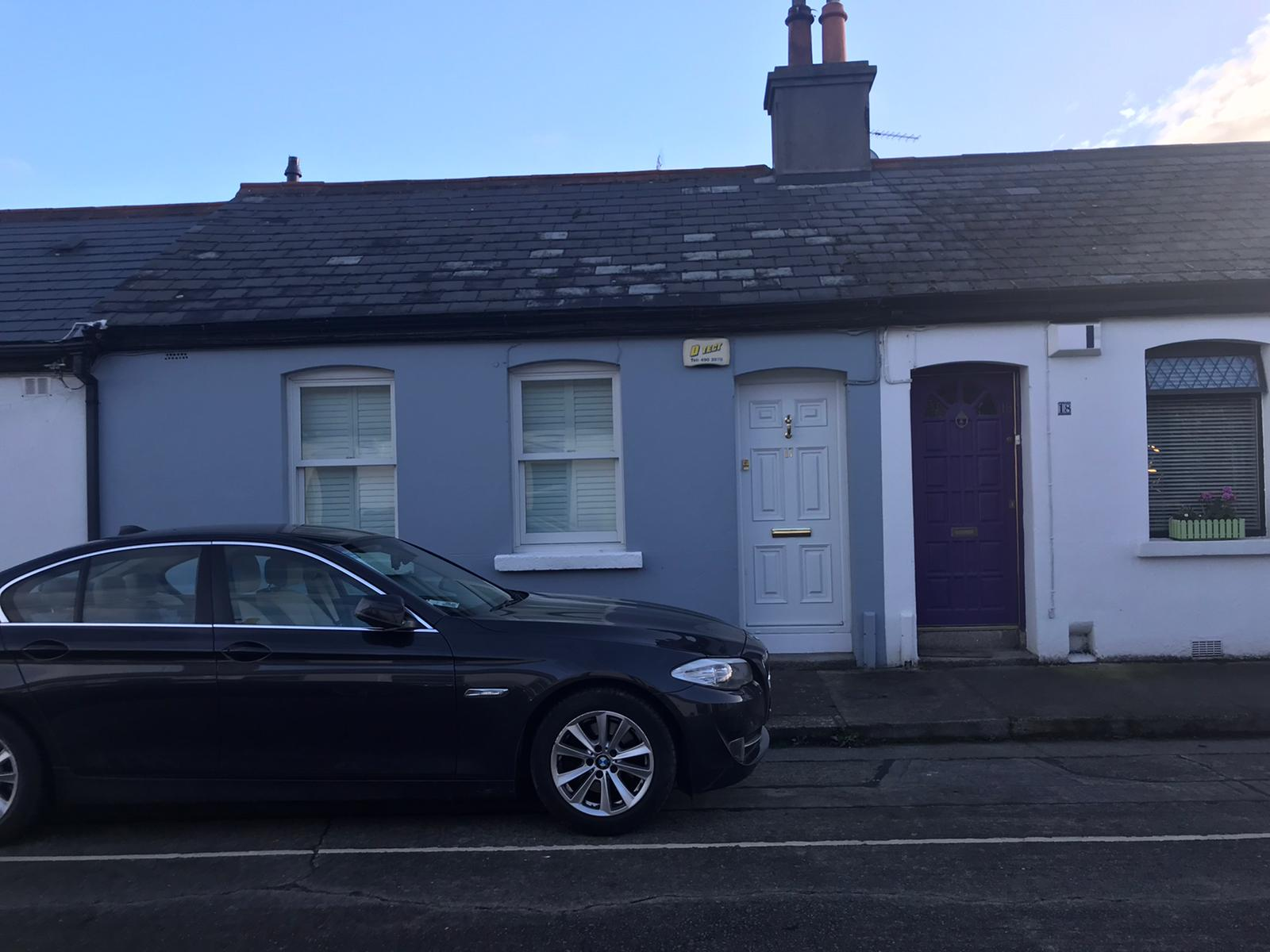
A photo of the childhood home of Irish actor Harry Brogan.

Harry Brogan was active in Irish theatre and a permanent member of the Abbey Theatre in 1936. He acted at the theatre for 40 years up until 1976, just before he died. He became one of the best known and best loved actors on the Irish stage, and the Abbey Theatre was where he established himself as one of the country's foremost character actors. He was best known for his portrayal of Séan O'Casey characters, performing the roles as Joxer in Juno and the Paycock, and Sheamus Shiels in The Shadow of a gunman. One of his last shows he performed was as Cardinal Richelieu in the play The Devils in 1976, when he was 72. During his time as an actor at the Abbey Theatre he was offered official parts in Broadway but he refused to work abroad except with the Abbey. He declined many film offers from England and America.

== Radio and television ==
Brogan was associated with Radio Éireann from its earliest days where he performed in many radio plays. Broadcasting began in Ireland in 1926 as 2RN and later changed to Radio Éireann in the 1960s, which was when Brogan became a crucial member. He was in the first broadcast play called William written by P. L. McCann. He was the first to read poetry on Radio Éireann. He broadcast the poems of Patrick Pearse. In 1946 he was part of a Raidió Teilifís Éireann production of a Teresa Deevy play Katie Roche which was produced by Gabriel Fallon.

In 1961 he starred on Raidió Teilifís Éireann first major dramatic work of John Millington Synge called 'The Well of the Saints'. He also starred in a 1959 film called Shake Hands with the Devil, written by Michael Anderson where Brogan was cast as a character called Tom Cassidy.

== Legacy ==
By the end of his life, Harry Brogan had starred in 18 films and over 80 theatre productions. Three of his children went on to work in theatre production and acting. His daughters, Patricia and Anne became actresses. Anne Brogan performed in the Abbey Theatre in Dublin, starring in seven theatre productions written in the Irish language. His son John, became the stage manager for the Olympia Theatre in Dublin and served there for over 30 years until he retired in 2008.

Brogan was regarded as one of Ireland's finest comedic actors by the time of his death. The Irish Theatre Institute listed him as one of the most frequently appearing male actors in Irish theatre for their report on Irish Playography from 1904 to 2006. His loyalty to the Abbey made him widely regarded as one of their best loved actors. His appearance on stage was always received well by audiences. His renowned portrayal of Uncle Peter in Séan O'Casey's "The Plough and the Stars" would receive a round of applause before he even spoke on stage. He helped portray a myriad of characters in some of the greatest productions of Irish theatre brought to the movie screen. Such films as The Quare Fellow by Brendan Behan in 1962 and Lies My Father Told Me by Ted Allen in 1960.

In 2014, The Abbey produced a video for their Oral History Project to the website, titled Memories of Harry Brogan. The video showcases a series of interviews from well known Irish actors such as Niall Buggy and Stephen Rea, recalling fond memories they have of Brogan and his work with the Abbey Theatre.

== Selected filmography ==
- The Promise of Barty O'Brien (1951) - Mr. O'Brien
- The Gentle Gunman (1952) - Barney (uncredited)
- Sally's Irish Rogue (1958) - Rabit Hamil
- Broth of a Boy (1959) - Willie Farrell
- Home Is the Hero (1959) - Dovetail
- Shake Hands with the Devil (1959) - Tom Cassidy
- This Other Eden (1959) - Clannery
- A Terrible Beauty (1960) - Patrick O'Neill
- Lies My Father Told Me (1960) - Grandfather
- The Siege of Sidney Street (1960) - Old Harry
- The Webster Boy (1962) - Grant
- The Quare Fellow (1962) - Dunlavin
- Never Put It in Writing (1964) - Mr. Breeden
- Girl with Green Eyes (1964) - Jack Holland
- Young Cassidy (1965) - Murphy
- The Face of Fu Manchu (1965) - Gaskell
- Jules Verne's Rocket to the Moon (1967) - Professor Dingle
- Terror of Frankenstein (1977) - The Blind Man (final film role)

== Playography ==
- The Land of Heart's Desire by W. B. Yeats (1939)
- Katie Roche by Teresa Deevy (1946)
