= John R. Sloan =

British film producer

- Born: 9 September 1912; Dumfriesshire, Scotland, United Kingdom
- Died: 2001 (aged 88–89); Ayrshire, Scotland, United Kingdom
- Occupation: Producer
- Years active: 1948–1982 (film and TV)

John R. Sloan (1912–2001) was a British film producer.

== Selected filmography ==
- Brass Monkey (1948)
- Circle of Danger (1951)
- Twist of Fate (1954) (U.S.'Beautiful Stranger')
- Port Afrique (1956)
- Keep It Clean (1956)
- Seven Waves Away (1957)
- The Safecracker (1958)
- Beyond This Place (1959)
- Johnny Nobody (1961)
- The Reluctant Saint (1962)
- The Running Man (1963)
- Lost Command (1966)
- To Sir, with Love (1967)
- Fragment of Fear (1970)
- Dad's Army (1971)
- No Sex Please, We're British (1973)
- The Odessa File (1974)
- Force 10 from Navarone (1978)

== Bibliography ==
- Nik Havert. The Golden Age of Disaster Cinema: A Guide to the Films, 1950-1979. McFarland, 2019.
