= Guns in the Heather =

1969 film by Robert Butler

- Spanish-language poster for European theatrical release as "El Secreto del Castillo" (English title — "The Secret of Boyne Castle")
- Directed by: Robert Butler
- Produced by: Ron Miller
- Starring: Glenn Corbett
- Music by: Buddy Baker
- Release date: July 1969
- Running time: 3:00:00 (180 minutes)
- Countries: United Kingdom; United States
- Language: English

Guns in the Heather is a 1969 Walt Disney adventure film directed by Robert Butler and produced by Ron Miller. It stars Kurt Russell, Glenn Corbett and Alfred Burke. It was originally broadcast in parts on Walt Disney's Wonderful World of Color in the United States under the title Guns in the Heather, then re-edited for a European theatrical release under the English title, The Secret of Boyne Castle. It was re-broadcast on American television in 1978 under the title Spy-Busters. The story is based on the 1963 novel Guns in the Heather, by Lockhart Amerman.

The film was primarily shot on location in Ireland (St. Flannan's College in Ennis, Corkscrew Hill, Corofin Kilfenoraand Kilnaboy, County Clare feature) with additional scenes shot at Pinewood Studios near London, England.

== Plot ==
American exchange student Rich Evans' day at the Leinster School in Ireland is interrupted when a dying man drives up to the school and gives Rich a message for his brother Tom. Rich and his friend Sean O’Connor are taken from the school by a man who claims to be from the American Embassy, but who turns out to be an Eastern Bloc agent. Rich and Sean make a daring escape and eventually reach Tom, who is an American intelligence agent and not the Irish sales rep for an American steel company as Rich thought. Rich and Sean get off the flight to London Tom placed them on when they spot some of the enemy agents and find Tom in time to save him from other agents, who had grabbed him. They head to Boyne castle, where the message said vital info about an East Bloc defecting scientist was hidden. However Tom is locked up with the real Lord Boyne, while East Bloc agents replace Lord Boyne and his staff. Rich finds the info, but when he calls the US embassy with it, the bad guys are listening in. The imprisoned group help Tom make an ingenious escape from the dungeon. Using a dory and a glider they are able to intercept the East Bloc agents before they can grab the defecting scientist.

== Cast ==
- Glenn Corbett as Tom Evans
- Alfred Burke as Kersner
- Kurt Russell as Rich Evans
- Patrick Dawson as Sean O'Connor
- Patrick Barr as Lord Boyne
- Hugh McDermott as Carleton
- Patrick Westwood as Levick
- Eddie Byrne as Bailey
- Godfrey Quigley as Meister
- Kevin Stoney as Enhardt
- Shay Gorman as Headmaster
- Niall Tóibín as Kettering
- Ernst Walder as Vollos
- Robert Bernal as Sgt. Clune
- Vincent Dowling as Maston
- John Horton as Stafford
- J. G. Devlin as Muldoon
- Nicola Davies as Kathleen
- Gerry Alexander as Paddy
- Eamon Morrissey as Hennessey
- Declan Mulholland as Retchick
- Mary Larkin as Mary
- Paul Farrell as Groundskeeper
