= Hansel and Gretel (1958 TV special) =

Musical

Hansel and Gretel is a musical adaptation of the Brothers Grimm story. It was directed by Paul Bogart and broadcast as a live television special on NBC on April 27, 1958. It is one of a long series of fantasies presented on television as musical specials after the enormously successful first two telecasts of the Mary Martin Peter Pan. But Hansel and Gretel did not repeat the success of Peter Pan or several of the other specials. It was shown only once, then lapsed into obscurity, although a cast album was issued. The album, also long forgotten, has recently been issued on compact disc.

The adaptation, like the telecast 1957 musical adaptation of Pinocchio with Mickey Rooney, features songs by Alec Wilder and William Engvick. It introduces many characters not in the original story including a quartet of characters named, respectively, Eenie, Meanie, Miney and Moe. Moe is portrayed by Sondra Lee, who played Tiger Lily in Peter Pan. Rather incongruously, thirty-nine-year-old comedian Red Buttons appears as Hansel, and then-new Broadway star Barbara Cook is Gretel. Other cast members include Hans Conried, Stubby Kaye, and Risë Stevens. The production's original sponsor was Rexall. Samuel Leve designed the sets for the production.
