= George Shiels =

Irish dramatist (1881–1949)

George Shiels (24 June 1881 – 19 September 1949) was an Irish dramatist whose plays were a success both in his native Ulster and at the Abbey Theatre in Dublin. His most famous plays are The Rugged Path, The Passing Day, and The New Gossoon.

== Biography ==
Shiels was born to Robert Shiels and Eileen (née MacSweeney) in Ballymoney, County Antrim; his father was a railway worker and he was one of eight children. He emigrated to Canada as a young man. While working on the building of the Canadian Pacific Railway in 1913, he was involved in a serious accident that left him in a wheelchair for the rest of his life. He returned to Ballymoney and started a shipping company with his brother, and also began writing at this time. Starting with poems and short stories, he soon progressed to plays, which he provided to the Ulster Literary Theatre under the pen name of George S. Morsheils.

Starting with Bedmates (1921), his plays began to be regularly accepted by the Abbey Theatre for production. His 1930 work The New Gossoon was so well-received that the Abbey's touring company, The Abbey Theatre Irish Players, brought the play to Broadway for limited runs three times, in 1932, 1934, and 1937. In 1940, a production of Shiels' The Rugged Path set an Abbey record. It eventually attracted a total audience of 25,000 people over eight weeks.

When his success as a playwright allowed him, he left the shipping business and moved to Carnlough on the coast of County Antrim, where he lived from 1932 until his death in 1949.

A memorial plaque was unveiled in Carnmoney in 2009.

== Works ==
- Away from the Moss (1918)
- Moodie in Manitoba (1918)
- Felix Reid and Bob (or The Simpleston) (1919)
- The Tame Drudge (or The Drudge) (1920)
- Bedmates (1921)
- Insurance Money (1921)
- Paul Twyning (1922)
- First Aid (1923)
- The Retrievers (1924)
- Professor Tim (1925) - filmed as Professor Tim (1957)
- Cartney & Kevney (1927)
- Mountain Dew (1929)
- The New Gossoon (1930) - filmed as Sally's Irish Rogue (1958)
- Grogan and the Ferret (1933)
- The Passing Day (1936)
- The Jailbird (1936)
- Quin's Secret (1937)
- Neal Maquade (1938) - later revised as Macook's Corner (1942)
- Give Him a House (1939)
- The Rugged Path (1940)
- The Summit (1941)
- The Fort Field (1942)
- The New Regime (1944)
- The Old Broom (1944)
- Tenants at Will (or The Brink of Famine) (1945)
- Borderwine (1946)
- Mountain Post (1948)
- The Caretakers (1948)
- Slave Drivers
- Tully's Experts

== See also ==
- List of Irish writers
