= The Last Man to Hang =

1956 British film by Terence Fisher

The Last Man to Hang?
- Original British quad poster
- Directed by: Terence Fisher
- Written by: Gerald Bullett; Ivor Montagu; Max Trell; Maurice Elvey
- Based on: novel The Jury by Gerald Bullett
- Produced by: John Gossage
- Starring: Tom Conway; Elizabeth Sellars
- Cinematography: Desmond Dickinson
- Edited by: Peter Taylor
- Music by: John Wooldridge
- Production company: Association of Cinema Technicians (A.C.T.)
- Distributed by: Columbia Pictures
- Release date: August 1956 (UK)
- Running time: 75 min.
- Country: United Kingdom
- Language: English

The Last Man to Hang? (Australia and New Zealand title: The Amazing Daphne Strood) is a 1956 crime film directed by Terence Fisher and starring Tom Conway and Elizabeth Sellars. It was produced by John Gossage for Act Films Ltd.

== Plot ==
Music critic Sir Roderick Strood is having an affair with a beautiful singer, Elizabeth Anders. In a storyline which appears partly in flashback and partly in real time, his wife Daphne refuses to give him a divorce and subsequently tries to shoot herself, but after apparently becoming reconciled to the situation tells Roderick to leave the country with the singer and that she shall see him on the other side. Sir Roderick gives his wife a strong sedative, given him by his mistress, not knowing that his wife's housekeeper, Mrs Tucker, has already given her a sedative. Daphne apparently dies of an overdose, though an early scene of her arrival at hospital has in fact made it clear that she is still alive, and that Mrs Tucker has deliberately mis-identified the body of another woman, brought to hospital at the same time, as Daphne's.

Stopped at the airport Sir Roderick says "I've killed her" and is arrested and charged with murder.

A jury must decide whether Sir Roderick poisoned his wife deliberately, or whether her death was accidental. Several references to the debate about the abolition of capital punishment that was going on in British society in the 1950s are made. One protracted jury room scene recalls the play for television Twelve Angry Men, which had been shown on US TV in 1954.

The trial focuses on the semantic difference between "I've killed her" and "I killed her", and on the question of whether Sir Roderick could have heard Mrs Tucker's voice, warning him not to give his wife a sedative as she had already done so, through a closed door. A demonstration that he might not have heard the housekeeper is enough to convince the jury and he is found not guilty.

Following the trial Sir Roderick returns home, but Mrs Tucker, despite having made every attempt to have Sir Roderick convicted and hanged, now admits that she knew he had not killed his wife as she is not dead. Having heard Roderick confess in the witness box that he still loved his wife and not Elizabeth, Mrs Tucker takes him to his wife (hiding in a large country cottage) where the police, whom Mrs Tucker has tipped off, wait outside to arrest the housekeeper for perjury.

== Historical note ==
The film was released in August 1956. Nobody was hanged in the UK between 12 August 1955, and 23 July 1957.

== Cast ==
- Tom Conway as Sir Roderick Strood
- Elizabeth Sellars as Daphne, Lady Strood
- Eunice Gayson as Elizabeth
- Freda Jackson as Mrs. Tucker
- Hugh Latimer as Mark Perryman
- Ronald Simpson as Dr. Cartwright
- Victor Maddern as Bonaker
- Anthony Newley as Cyril Gaskin
- Margaretta Scott as Mrs. Cranshaw
- Leslie Weston as James Bayfield
- Martin Boddey as Detective Sergeant Horne
- Joan Hickson as Mrs. Prynne
- David Horne as Antony Harcombe, Q.C.
- Walter Hudd as the Judge (Mr. Justice Sarum)
- Raymond Huntley as Attorney General
- Harold Siddons as Cheed's doctor
- Olive Sloane as Mrs. Bayfield
- John Schlesinger as Doctor Goldfinger
- Gillian Lynne as Gladys, Gaskin's girlfriend

== Critical reception ==
The Monthly Film Bulletin wrote: "This British court drama follows a now familiar pattern, including the customary cameos of the jury members showing their private lives and problems; the trial itself (with flashbacks) and the final deliberations. Tom Conway seems unsuitably cast and gives a somewhat unconvincing performance; the other players range from adequate to good. Altogether, a conscientious but rather stagey production with an implausible surprise ending."

Chibnall and McFarlane in The British 'B' Film call the film "a not particularly distinguished Old Bailey trial drama with a twist ending that boasted an unusually strong cast."

Leslie Halliwell described it as a: "reasonably interesting co-feature."

In British Sound Films: The Studio Years 1928–1959 David Quinlan rated the film as "mediocre", writing: "Dullish, highly unlikelt thriller."

Kim Newman wrote: "It's a strange piece of storytelling, perhaps made stranger by censorship requirements, and ambitious in its scope for a quota quickie built around a fading (and appropriately glum) Hollywood name, Tom Conway."

== See also ==
- List of British films of 1956
