= The Beautiful People (play) =

The Beautiful People is a play by William Saroyan. It is set in San Francisco, California.

== History ==
Produced and directed by Saroyan, The Beautiful People premiered on Broadway at the Lyceum Theatre on April 21, 1941. It ran there for a total of 120 performances; closing on August 2, 1941. The cast included Curtis Cooksey as Jonah Webster, Betsy Blair as Agnes Webster, Eugene Loring as Owen Webster, Fredrica Slemon as Harmony Blueblossom, Farrell Pelly as Dan Hillboy, E. J. Ballantine as William Prim, Edward Nannary as Father Hogan, Don Freeman as Harold Webster, and Peter Xantho as Steve. The sets were designed by Samuel Leve.

It was revived in 1993 by the Hollywood Theatre Club in Los Angeles. The Finborough Theatre in London staged the play in 2008.
