= Lies My Father Told Me (1960 film) =

1960 British film by Don Chaffey

- Directed by: Don Chaffey
- Written by: Ted Allan
- Starring: Harry Brogan; Betsy Blair
- Music by: Wilfred Josephs
- Production company: Emmet Dalton Productions
- Release date: August 1960
- Running time: 60 min.
- Country: United Kingdom
- Language: English

Lies My Father Told Me is a 1960 British film directed by Don Chaffey and starring Harry Brogan and Betsy Blair. It was written by Ted Allan.

The film was to be distributed by Eros Films but the company went bankrupt, with this and three other films, Johnny Nobody, Middle of Nowhere and Carolina, awaiting distribution.

== Plot ==
This film follows Jewish people in Dublin; in a working-class family, a young boy becomes increasingly close to an old orthodox Jew and assimilates his views, much to the dismay of his family.

== Cast ==
- Harry Brogan as grandfather
- Betsy Blair as mother
- Eddie Golden as father
- Rita O'Dea as grandmother
- Terry Raven as David
