= This Other Eden (film) =

- Directed by: Muriel Box
- Written by: Blanaid Irvine; Patrick Kirwan
- Based on: This Other Eden, a play by Louis D'Alton
- Produced by: Muriel Box; Alec C. Snowden
- Starring: Audrey Dalton; Leslie Phillips; Niall MacGinnis; Geoffrey Golden
- Cinematography: Gerald Gibbs
- Edited by: Henry Richardson
- Music by: Lambert Williamson
- Production company: Emmett Dalton Productions
- Distributed by: Regal Films International (UK)
- Release date: 1959
- Running time: 80 minutes
- Country: Ireland
- Language: English

This Other Eden is a 1959 Irish comedy drama film directed by Muriel Box and starring Audrey Dalton, Leslie Phillips and Niall MacGinnis. It was written by Blanaid Irvine and Patrick Kirwan adapted from the play of the same title by Louis D'Alton, first performed at Dublin's Queen's Theatre in June 1953 by the Abbey players.

The film's prologue involves the death of an Irish commandant during the Irish War of Independence, who is shot by the Black and Tans. The film then skips forward a few decades, to the unveiling of a statue commemorating the war hero. When an Englishman arrives to settle in Ireland, the locals distrust him and soon blame him for the statue's destruction.

== Plot ==
The film opens with a prologue set during the Irish War of Independence. Mick Devereaux and Commandant Jack Carberry of the Irish Republican Army (IRA) are meeting a British officer to negotiate a cease-fire. Carberry walks down a deserted road and is suddenly fired upon by hidden Black and Tan soldiers. Devereaux kneels beside Carberry as he dies, and Carberry pleads with him to "see to everything."

Several years later, local gombeen man McRoarty is attending a meeting of the Carberry Memorial Committee. His daughter Maire is returning home from England. On the train, Maire meets Englishman Crispin Brown, who wishes to settle in Ballymorgan. A large house in Ballymorgan named Kilgarrig is soon to be auctioned. Preparations are being made for the erection of a statue commemorating Commandant Carberry. Maire meets her friend Conor Heaphy on the train to Ballymorgan.

At the hotel, Maire introduces Crispin to everyone. He faces some hostility from Clannery for being an Englishman. Conor also receives an awkward response from the men, which puzzles him. McRoarty fears that Conor and Maire will begin a romantic relationship and reveals to her that Conor is the illegitimate son of Jack Carberry and of McRoarty's sister. Maire is accepting of the news but declares that she never had a romantic interest in Conor. Conor tells the Canon that he wishes to become a priest, but the Canon is hesitant. Devereaux eventually tells Conor that he is illegitimate, which angers him. (Prior to 1983, the son of unmarried parents could not become a priest without a dispensation.)

The statue to commemorate Carberry is unveiled. Its modern abstract design is met with disgust and disappointment from the crowd. Crispin is particularly vocal about his displeasure. Crispin proposes to Maire and asks her to live with him in Kilgarrig. Maire declines, stating that she could never live in Ballymorgan. The statue is blown up, and Crispin is initially blamed. Crispin reveals that his father was the English officer Carberry intended to meet on the night of his death. He resigned his post in sympathy with the IRA following Carberry's murder.

An angry crowd gathers at the hotel, still maintaining that Crispin is to blame. Crispin goes out to the hotel balcony and manages to calm the crowd by praising Ireland and promising to pay for a new statue. Conor enters and attempts to reveal to the crowd that he is the true culprit, but is stopped by Maire and Devereaux. The men at the hotel are horrified to find that Conor wishes to stand trial and make everything public. Devereaux bids him to be more understanding. Maire explains the situation to Crispin, and he reveals that he too is illegitimate. He also reveals his mother was an Irish Protestant. Maire is completely accepting of this information, to her father's annoyance.

McRoarty receives a phone call that a journalist is coming to Ballymorgan to investigate what happened to the statue. The journalist, MacPherson, arrives with photographers, but the townspeople deny that there was a riot and that Conor was involved. The Canon assures Conor he will be able to fulfil his vocation in some way, even if he does not become a priest.

Crispin succeeds in purchasing Kilgarrig. Clannery blames the destruction on a faulty electrical cable lighting some explosives that he left near the statue. McRoarty and Maire argue about her wish to return to England. Maire informs Crispin that if he still wants to marry her, he should ask her father for a large dowry. Crispin succeeds in procuring the dowry and Maire's hand in marriage.

== Cast ==
- Audrey Dalton as Maire McRoarty
- Leslie Phillips as Crispin Brown
- Niall MacGinnis as Devereaux
- Geoffrey Golden as McRoarty
- Norman Rodway as Conor Heaphy
- Milo O'Shea as Pat Tweedy
- Harry Brogan as Clannery
- Paul Farrell as McNeely
- Eddie Golden as Sergeant Crilly
- Hilton Edwards as the Canon
- Fay Sargent as Canon's housekeeper
- Philip O'Flynn as postman
- Ria Mooney as Mother Superior
- Isobel Couser as Mrs. O'Flaherty

== Production ==
The film was made at Ardmore Studios in Bray, County Wicklow; Kilgarrig was portrayed by Hollywood House near Glenealy, and other location filming took place in Wicklow Town, Chapelizod, Woodenbridge, Dún Laoghaire and Rathdrum. British director and writer Muriel Box was the first woman to direct an Irish feature film, receiving the script for This Other Eden on 1 January 1959. Shooting was completed on 12 February 1959, just under a month from when filming began. Box wrote in her diary that on the set of This Other Eden "for the first time that I can remember I looked around with genuine love and affection for the crew who were working with me and the pleasure which the artists gave me I have not experienced before in films". The film was distributed by Regal Films Internationa and had its Irish premiere at the Cork Film Festival in September 1959.

== Critical reception ==
The Monthly Film Bulletin wrote: "The complexity of motives surrounding the plot drastically reduce the film's impact. It aims at too many satirical targets and in the event hits none. Problems touched on but never pursued include Irish hatred of the English, anti-Catholicism, newspaper morality, glorification of the IRA, to mention nothing of the many personal attachments and motivations. Even the Abbey Players, forced to oscillate between seriousness and humour, fail to disguise a poor script, and Crispin Brown is a caricature of embarrassing proportions. If all else fail, the gap is filled by Irish whimsy, and the resultant mixture is only made palatable by the acting of such stalwarts as Niall MacGinnis and Hilton Edwards."

TV Guide noted, "this unlikely subject for a comedy is slanted in favor of the British."

David Parkinson in the Radio Times called it "a curious film for Leslie Phillips to find himself in, this is an overwrought tale about the emotions that erupt when the statue of a long-dead IRA hero is blown up in the square of a sleepy Irish village.... Phillips is fine... He is adequately supported by Audrey Dalton as his lover and Norman Rodway... but the film lacks the power of such Hollywood lynch dramas as Fritz Lang's Fury or William A Wellman's The Ox-Bow Incident."
