= The Webster Boy =

1962 Irish film

- Lobby card
- Directed by: Don Chaffey
- Screenplay by: Ted Allan
- Produced by: Emmet Dalton
- Starring: Richard O'Sullivan; John Cassavetes; Elizabeth Sellars
- Cinematography: Gerald Gibbs
- Edited by: John Trumper
- Music by: Wilfred Josephs
- Production company: Ardmore Studios
- Release date: 1962
- Running time: 104 minutes
- Country: United Kingdom
- Language: English

The Webster Boy is a 1962 Irish film directed by Don Chaffey and written by Ted Allan and Leo Marks.

== Cast ==
- Richard O'Sullivan as Jimmy Webster
- John Cassavetes as Vance Miller
- Elizabeth Sellars as Margaret Webster
- David Farrar as Paul Webster
- Geoffrey Bayldon as Charles Jamieson
- Niall MacGinnis as headmaster
- Harry Brogan as Grant
- Seymour Cassel as Vic

== Reception ==
The Monthly Film Bulletin wrote: "Unconvincing and altogether weird, this attempt at a British Frenzy has nothing to recommend it. The dialogue is unspeakable, for one thing, and since the worst of it goes to Geoffrey Bayldon as the psychotic schoolmaster, one can't even judge whether this unusual actor is unusually bad or unusually original, or whether he simply can't help turning nasty whenever he finds himself involved in films like The Webster Boy."

Leslie Halliwell said: "Curious, totally unbelievable melodrama."
