= Fay Sargent =

Irish singer, actress and journalist (1890–1967)

- Born: Mary Gertrude Hannan; 16 January 1890; Waterford, Ireland
- Died: 23 December 1967 (aged 77); 49 Mespil Road, Dublin
- Known for: acting and journalism

Fay Sargent (born Mary Gertrude Hannan, 16 January 1890 – 23 December 1967) was an Irish singer, actor, and journalist.

== Life ==
Sargent was born 16 January 1890 at Manor Street in Waterford. She was the only child of Terence Hannan and Mary Daly. Her father died when she was an infant, leading her mother to move to England with her. They lived with her uncle, the Rev. Richard Hannan, at a parish at Lamley Moor, near Durham. There she was schooled in a French school and Loreto nuns. From a young age she was involved with the Gaelic League in London, possibly influenced by her cousin Richard Barry O'Brien. It was through her involvement in his movement she met her husband, Philip Armfield Sargent, a timber merchant. They married in London on 16 September 1908 when she was 17. Philip was an English Quaker, but had strong sympathies with Irish nationalism and was involved in the events of Easter 1916. After that he was possibly held in Lewes naval prison until June 1916 when he was transferred to Frongoch camp, north Wales.

The couple moved to Ireland a number of years after their marriage, living at 124 Leinster Road, Rathmines, Dublin in 1915. Sargent toured the country on behalf of the Gaelic League, singing traditional Irish songs. She began acting in 1918 in the Abbey Theatre and silent films, under the name "Dymphna Daly". She played the part of Mrs Golder in John MacDonagh's The Irish Jew at the Empire in 1921, alongside Jimmy O'Dea. In the years that followed she appeared in a number of O'Dea's revues, but did not act full-time as she felt it was not compatible with her family commitments.

She described herself as "drifting" into journalism, but it is her regular column in The Herald that she was best known. Her column appeared from 1920 until 1940, and featured the phonetically written conversations of Dublin characters called Mrs Casey, Mrs Byrne, and Mrs Win-the-war. These characters were used for radio sketches in 1928, where she performed with Joan Burke on 2RN. Owing to the success of the characters they were featured at fancy dress balls. Her other broadcasting work included adaptations of classic children's stories, and performing in some of John MacDonagh's radio plays. She returned to the Abbey in 1956 for St. John Greer Ervine's Boyd's shop, and in 1958 for a small part in Micheál Mac Liammóir's adaptation of The informer at the Gate.

Sargent died suddenly on 23 December 1967 at home at 49 Mespil Road, Dublin. She was buried at Mount Jerome Cemetery.

== Roles ==
=== Film ===
- Cruiskeen Lawn (1922)
- This Other Eden (1959)
- Boyd's Shop (1960)

=== Stage ===
- The Informer (1958)
