= Johnny Nobody =

1961 British film by Nigel Patrick

- British quad poster
- Directed by: Nigel Patrick
- Screenplay by: Patrick Kirwan
- Based on: story The Trial of Johnny Nobody by Albert Z. Carr
- Produced by: John R. Sloan
- Starring: Nigel Patrick; Yvonne Mitchell; William Bendix; Aldo Ray
- Cinematography: Ted Moore
- Edited by: Geoffrey Foot
- Music by: Ron Goodwin
- Production companies: Viceroy Films Ltd. Warwick Film Productions
- Distributed by: Eros Films (UK)
- Release date: October 1961
- Running time: 88 minutes
- Country: United Kingdom
- Language: English

Johnny Nobody is a 1961 British drama film made in Ireland and directed by Nigel Patrick, starring Yvonne Mitchell, William Bendix and Aldo Ray. It was written by Patrick Kirwan based on the story The Trial of Johnny Nobody by Albert Z. Carr. It was produced John R. Sloan for Viceroy Films, with Irving Allen and Albert R. Broccoli as executive producers. A man arrested for murder claims to be suffering from amnesia. Father Carey investigates the case, and looks for the killer's motive.

== Story ==
Irish American writer James Ronald Mulcahy is murdered moments after he has dared God to strike him dead. His murderer looks for help from the man who must decide his fate, the local priest, Father Carey. The killer is tagged "Johnny Nobody" by the press because of his claim to have total amnesia, but further investigation by Carey leads him to question whether or not "Johnny" was acting for God or, as seems more likely, a woman known as Miss Floyd who turns out to be his wife.

== Cast ==
- Nigel Patrick as Father Carey
- Yvonne Mitchell as Miss Floyd
- William Bendix as James Ronald Mulcahy
- Aldo Ray as Johnny Nobody
- Cyril Cusack as Prosecuting Counsel O'Brien
- Bernie Winters as photographer
- Niall MacGinnis as Defending Counsel Sullivan
- Noel Purcell as Brother Timothy
- Eddie Byrne as Landlord O'Connor
- John Welsh as Judge
- Joe Lynch as Tinker
- Jimmy O'Dea as postman Tim
- Frank O'Donovan as Garda
- T P McKenna as Garda
- May Craig as Tinker's mother
- Norman Rodway as Father Healey
- Michael Brennan as Supt. Lynch

== Production ==
The film was announced in December 1958.

The film was shot at Ardmore Studios in Bray, Ireland. Filming started 23 May 1960 for Warwick Pictures although the film would be credited to Viceroy Films.

In June 1960 Warwick announced it would not make films through major studios but would produce and distribute films itself with a slate of pictures worth $8 million a year: "three big films a year" plus eight others which it would finance through Eros (that would cost an estimated $3 million all up). Eros would distribute The Trials of Oscar Wilde in the UK and Warwick had just finished making Johnny Nobody.

== Release ==
In May 1961 Eros ran into financial difficulties, while distributing The Trials of Oscar Wilde and several staff were fired. Four films were awaiting distribution - Johnny Nobody, Middle of Nowhere, Carolina and Lies My Father Told Me.

The film did not come out until December 1961. "Why... [it] had to wait nearly 18 months for a booking, heaven alone knows," asked Kine Weekly.

== Critical reception ==
Monthly Film Bulletin said "The combination of religion (or at any rate Providence) and an Irish setting has produced a story even more fantastic than The Singer Not The Song [1961], though the film itself is disappointing on any level. The plot resembles nothing so much as a cosy murder mystery, moving in the convulsive jerks of a lesser British Thirties thriller, while the unreal dialogue has a compulsive predictability. Intriguing films have been made from equally bizarre material. Unfortunately this is not one of them. ... The more one thinks of it, the more one is amazed that anyone should have thought a plot and players as uniformly unlikely as these could have worked out satisfactorily."

Variety wrote "Imported suspenser run-of-the-mill programmer despite stroger than usual casting. [The film] has a cast that compares for talent with many bigger-budgeted and more ambitious efforts. And that's about the only thing it has going for it."

Boxoffice said "An engrossing display of histrionic talents by an internationally known and respected cast. ... Nigel Patrick's delineation is at once sentimental and suave, penetrating and philiosophic."

Leslie Halliwell said: "A mysterious rigmarole which irritates more than entertains."
