= Eugene Loring =

American choreographer

Eugene Loring (August 2, 1911 – August 30, 1982) was an American dancer, choreographer, actor, teacher, and administrator.

== Life and career ==
Eugene Loring, born as LeRoy Kerpestein, the son of a saloon-keeper, grew up on a small island in Wisconsin's Milwaukee River. He took gymnastic lessons. His artistic education in Milwaukee was formative. Nine years of piano training developed his musical ability broadly into orchestration, and his work with the Wisconsin Players, particularly under the direction of Russian native Boris Glagolin, developed his strong theatrical sense and gave him an awareness of dance as a theatrical force.

With savings from his job as a hardware-store manager, Loring went to New York City near the depth of the Great Depression in 1934, and was taken into George Balanchine's and Lincoln Kirstein's newly formed School of American Ballet. With the Russian Imperial training given by SAB, he danced with Balanchine's first American company, American Ballet, and even auditioned successfully for Michel Fokine.

When Kirstein formed the specifically American choreographic training company Ballet Caravan in 1936, Loring and Lew Christensen (who together formed a little company, Dance Players, 1941–42) emerged as its outstanding products.

Within two years Loring choreographed and danced in Billy the Kid, which enjoys status as the first American ballet classic, with an unbroken history of production since. After choreographic residence at Bennington College, Vermont, where he made some works, Loring joined Ballet Theatre (now ABT) in 1939, where, in that company's first season, he choreographed and danced in his The Great American Goof, with libretto by William Saroyan. He later acted in the Broadway production of Saroyan's The Beautiful People; portraying Owen Webster.

Loring, who began dancing in his father's saloon, was at ease with all kinds of dance, whether ballet, modern, or theatrical. He choreographed the Broadway musicals Carmen Jones and Silk Stockings and had an extensive career in Hollywood, directing and choreographing for film and television. Dancers he worked with most frequently include Fred Astaire, Cyd Charisse, and James Mitchell. Some of Loring's most notable films include: Silk Stockings, Funny Face (both in 1957), Ziegfeld Follies, The Toast of New Orleans, Deep in My Heart, Meet Me in Las Vegas.

Loring resettled in Los Angeles in 1943 under contract to MGM – Loring had a feature role in National Velvet even before he choreographed for them – and commissioned Richard Neutra to build his home in the Hollywood Hills neighborhood in 1959. In Los Angeles, he turned his attention to regularizing and applying his principles of versatile "Freestyle" professional dance education, including (from 1955) his own dance notation, Kineseography. Loring operated the commercially successful American School of Dance in Hollywood along those principles, and from 1965 developed them in a university educational setting, on invitation by Dean Clayton Garrison to chair the Department of Dance within the School of Fine Arts of the newly formed University of California, Irvine. Loring retired from UCI in 1981, returning to New York; he died a year later, aged 71.

== Ballet choreology ==
- Harlequin for President (1936)
- Yankee Clipper (1937)
- Billy the Kid (1938)
- City Portrait (1939)
- The Great American Goof (1940)
- Prairie
- The Man from Midian
- Yolanda and The Thief (1945) Movie. MGM. (including 15-minute 'Dream Ballet' sequence.)
- The Capitol of the World (1953)
- "The 5,000 Fingers of Dr. T" (1953)
- These Three (1966)
