= Elizabeth Sellars =

Scottish actress (1921–2019)

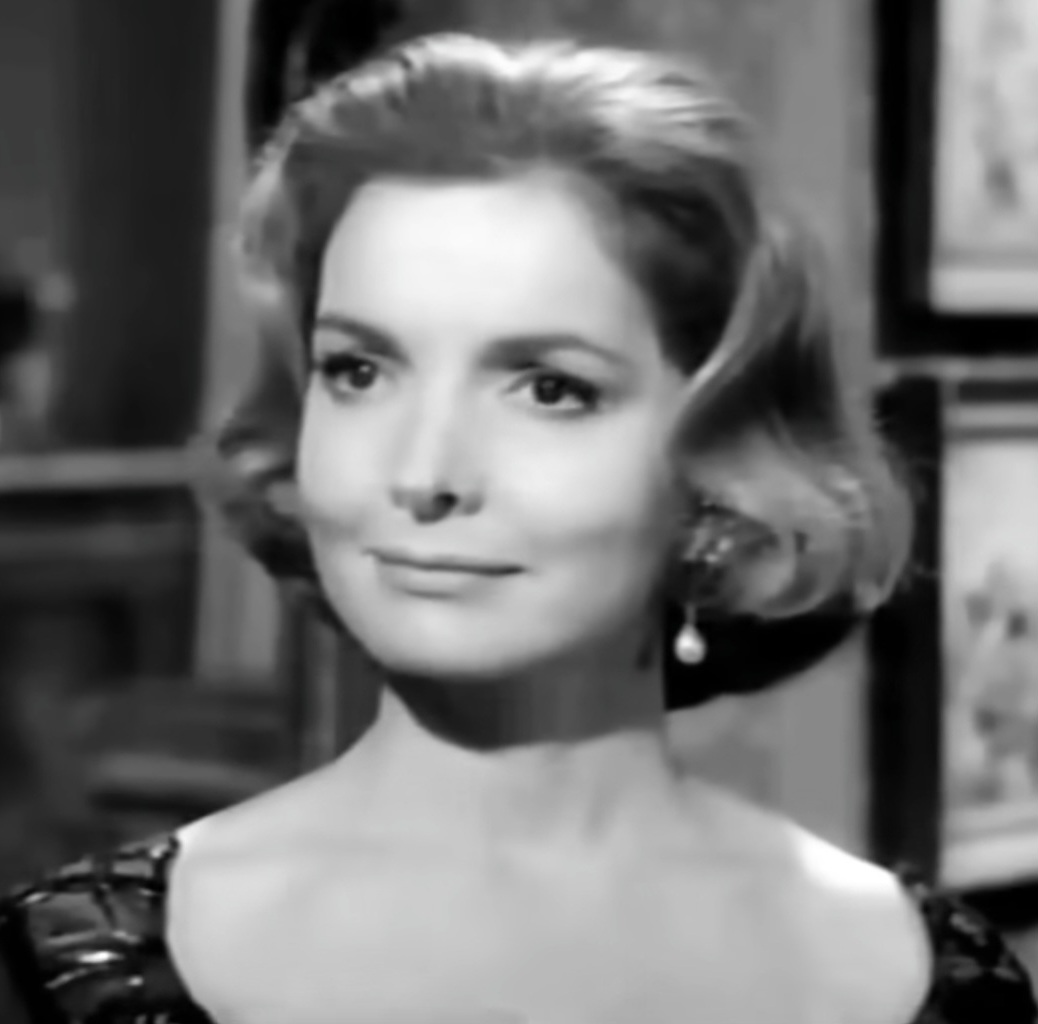
- Sellars in the TV series One Step Beyond, episode The Villa, 1961
- Born: Elizabeth Macdonald Sellars; 6 May 1921; Glasgow, Lanarkshire, Scotland
- Died: 30 December 2019 (aged 98); Paris, France
- Education: Royal Academy of Dramatic Art
- Occupation: Actress
- Years active: 1949–1990
- Spouse: Francis Austin Henley (m. 1960; died 2009)

Elizabeth Macdonald Sellars (6 May 1921 – 30 December 2019) was a Scottish actress.

== Early life and education ==
Sellars was born in Glasgow, Scotland, the daughter of Stephen Sellars and Jean Sutherland. She appeared on the stage from the age of 15, and trained at the Royal Academy of Dramatic Art. She also studied law for five years in England.

== Career ==
Sellars worked with ENSA during World War II, entertaining British troops. She made her first London stage appearance in 1946 in The Brothers Karamazov, directed by Peter Brook and sharing the stage with Alec Guinness. She later appeared with the Royal Shakespeare Company as Elizabeth in Richard III, Helen in Troilus and Cressida, Gertrude in Hamlet and Hermione in The Winter's Tale. She played opposite Valentine Dyall, Louise Hampton, and Anthony Ireland in The Other Side, at the Comedy Theatre, London, in 1946.

Sellars entered films with Floodtide (1949), part of an all-Scottish cast, including Gordon Jackson. She appeared in a string of British films in the 1950s and 1960s, and also a few Hollywood films, usually in secondary roles, including The Barefoot Contessa (1954), Désirée (1954), Prince of Players (1955), The Day They Robbed the Bank of England (1960), 55 Days at Peking (1963), and The Chalk Garden (1964). She was the main female lead in a number of films, including The Long Memory (1953), The Last Man to Hang (1956), Never Let Go (1960), and The Webster Boy (1962). She also appeared frequently on television, most notably in A Voyage Round My Father (1982) with Laurence Olivier.

== Personal life ==
On 8 September 1960, Sellars married surgeon Francis Austin Henley in Stow-on-the-Wold, England. They remained together until his death on 31 January 2009. Sellars died on 30 December 2019 at her home in France, aged 98 years.

== Partial filmography ==
- Floodtide (1949) as Judy
- Madeleine (1950) as Christina Hackett
- Guilt Is My Shadow (1950) as Linda
- Cloudburst (1951) as Carol Graham
- Night Was Our Friend (1951) as Sally Raynor
- Hunted (1952) as Magda Lloyd
- The Gentle Gunman (1952) as Maureen Fagan
- The Long Memory (1953) as Fay Lowther
- The Broken Horseshoe (1953) as Della Freeman
- Recoil (1953) as Jean Talbot
- Three's Company (1953) as Diane Graham (segment "The Surgeon's Story")
- Forbidden Cargo (1954) as Rita Compton
- The Barefoot Contessa (1954) as Jerry Dawes
- Désirée (1954) as Julie Clary, Désirée's Sister
- Prince of Players (1955) as Asia Booth
- Three Cases of Murder (1955) as Elizabeth ("You Killed Elizabeth" segment)
- The Last Man to Hang (1956) as Daphne Strood
- The Man in the Sky (1957) as Mary Mitchell
- The Shiralee (1957) as Marge
- Law and Disorder (1958) as Gina Laselle
- Jet Storm (1959) as Inez Barrington
- The Day They Robbed the Bank of England (1960) as Iris Muldoon
- Never Let Go (1960) as Anne Cummings
- The Webster Boy (1962) as Margaret Webster
- 55 Days at Peking (1963) as Lady Sarah Robertson
- The Chalk Garden (1964) as Olivia
- The Mummy's Shroud (1967) as Barbara Preston
- The Hireling (1973) as Lady Franklin's mother
- A Voyage Round My Father (1982, TV movie) as Mother
- Play for Today ('Last Love') (1983) as Annabel Fox (co-starring Dave King (actor) (written by Reg Gadney)
- Farrington (1987, TV series) as Delia Murdock
- The Play on One: The Dunroamin' Rising (1988, TV play) as Jean Sutherland
- A Ghost in Monte Carlo (1990, TV movie) as Countess Kissler
