= The Rising of the Moon (play) =

Play by Augusta, Lady Gregory

The Rising of the Moon is a play by Augusta, Lady Gregory.

It is a political play which examines Anglo-Irish relations. It was first produced on March 9, 1907 by the Irish National Theatre.

It is the basis of the "21" episode, in The Rising of the Moon (film), by John Ford.
