= Theater Talk =

Theater Talk is an American television talk show about live theater in New York City which aired on Thirteen WNET from 1996 to 2018. It was also syndicated from 2008 to 2018 on public television stations around the country both on TV and online. The guests included actors, writers, composers, directors, critics and others who contributed to the theater in New York, on Broadway and beyond.

The series premiered in 1993 under the title Inside Broadway on the Manhattan Neighborhood Network. It was co-created by journalist Michael Riedel and artist/educator Susan Haskins and producer Stephen Ahern.

The series moved in 1996 to Thirteen WNET, New York City's PBS station and was renamed Theater Talk. Ahern subsequently left the show and Haskins became the Executive Producer.

Theater Talk moved its production to CUNY TV in 1998.

Theater Talk's broadcasters expanded in 1999 to include WGBH, Boston's PBS station. National syndication followed in 2008 (in partnership with CUNY TV) to PBS and public TV stations across the USA. By its final season, it aired on more than one hundred stations and had more than 700 episodes.

Michael Riedel left Theater Talk in May 2017 and was replaced by a new team of co-hosts with Haskins (now Haskins-Doloff).

Theater Talk left CUNY TV and the weekly series suspended production in July 2018 due to changes in leadership and a lack of options for a future host. Theater Talk 2019 Tony Awards predictions special was taped at The Library of the Performing Arts at Lincoln Center before a live audience. It was syndicated nationally in May 2019.

Theater Talk won New York Emmy Awards in 2017 and 2019 for Best Interview/Discussion Series.
