= Pinocchio (1957 TV program) =

Pinocchio, a 1957 60-minute television special production of Pinocchio, is a live musical version directed by Paul Bogart and starring Mickey Rooney in the title role of the puppet who wishes to become a real boy. Based on the 1883 novel The Adventures of Pinocchio by Carlo Collodi, which also inspired the Walt Disney animated film, this version featured a now-forgotten new score by Alec Wilder and William Engvick. It was telecast once on NBC as a television special, and, as far as is known, never rebroadcast by NBC, or even restaged with a different cast as was Rodgers and Hammerstein's Cinderella. Nor has it ever been issued on VHS or DVD. Other notable actors who appeared in the special included Walter Slezak (as Geppetto), Fran Allison (as the Blue Fairy), Martyn Green (as the Fox), Jerry Colonna (as a Ringmaster), and Stubby Kaye as a Town Crier, a role he repeated in Wilder and Engvick's 1958 television musical, Hansel and Gretel. Pinocchio was directed by noted Broadway choreographer Hanya Holm. It was also simultaneously broadcast on NBC Radio stations.

This was the second of many versions of Pinocchio that have been written especially for television, the most recent being in 2008. The first television Pinocchio was a satirical version featured as an episode of The Spike Jones Show in 1954. Jones himself played the title role.

The 1957 special was one of many children's fantasy musical specials to be shown on television between 1955 and 1959 in the wake of the enormously successful first two telecasts of the Mary Martin musical Peter Pan.

One novel touch about the 1957 Pinocchio was that when the puppet finally became a real boy, pieces of wood began falling off of his body onto the floor.

Although it has been erroneously claimed that the program no longer exists, it has apparently survived on kinescope. And after languishing in obscurity for years, a cast album of the show has been issued on CD. According to sources, however, Gordon B. Clarke substitutes for Walter Slezak on the album.
