= The Rising of the Moon (film) =

1957 Irish film by John Ford

- Original Australian film poster
- Directed by: John Ford
- Screenplay by: Frank S. Nugent
- Based on: The Majesty of the Law 1935 story in Fortnightly Review by Frank O'Connor; The Rising of the Moon 1907 play by Lady Augusta Gregory; A Minute's Wait 1918 play by Michael J. McHugh
- Produced by: Michael Killanin
- Starring: Cyril Cusack; Noel Purcell; Denis O'Dea
- Narrated by: Tyrone Power
- Cinematography: Robert Krasker
- Edited by: Michael Gordon
- Music by: Eamonn O'Gallagher
- Distributed by: Warner Bros. Pictures
- Release date: 10 August 1957
- Running time: 81 minutes
- Country: Ireland
- Language: English

The Rising of the Moon is a 1957 Irish anthology film directed by John Ford. It consists of three episodes all set in Ireland:

- "The Majesty of the Law", based on the short story of that title by Frank O'Connor in Bones of Contention
- "A Minute's Wait", based on a 1914 one-act comedy by Martin J. McHugh
- "1921", based on the play The Rising of the Moon by Lady Gregory.

== Plot ==
=== The Majesty of the Law ===
Police Inspector Dillon reluctantly sets out walking through the countryside to see an old friend, Dan O'Flaherty. Along the way, he encounters Mickey J., a poitín maker (bootlegger) who is not Dillon's target, but accompanies Dillon to O'Flaherty's stone cottage where Dillon serves O'Flaherty a warrant for striking Phelim O'Feeney. While they are all congenially drinking and socializing inside O'Flaherty's cottage, O'Flaherty refuses to pay the fine. He feels he has done nothing wrong, nor will he allow O'Feeney to pay it for him. Instead, he heads off to prison.

The song "Come Back Paddy Reilly to Ballyjamesduff", written in 1912 by Percy French, is featured at the closing of the story.

=== A Minute's Wait ===
A train pulls up to the Dunfaill station in County Kerry, where Paddy Morrisey announces there will be "a minute's wait". The passengers and crew crowd into the bar for refreshments, served by Pegeen Mallory. Later, Paddy finally proposes to his longtime girlfriend Pegeen.

Mrs. Falsey chats with her old friend Barney Domigan, while her niece Mary Ann MacMahon becomes acquainted with his son Christy. Domigan is on his way to arrange a marriage between Christy and a young woman with a substantial dowry. Mrs. Falsey persuades him to change his mind by informing him that the U.S. Army has awarded Mary Ann $10,000 for her father's death in battle. The young couple, unaware of this development, insist they will only marry each other.

Meanwhile, the train is repeatedly delayed, much to the befuddlement of an older English couple. They are first displaced from their first class compartment to make way for a prize-winning goat. Then, they have to share their new compartment with lobsters intended for the bishop's golden jubilee. Finally, the bar receives a phone call asking that the train add on another car needed to accommodate a hurling team whose bus has broken down nearby after a match. When the English couple finally get off for some tea, they are left behind when the train finally departs.

=== 1921 ===
Sean Curran awaits his execution in Galway prison by the British during the "Black and Tan War". This is very unpopular with the Irish public who consider him a hero. A sizable crowd of nuns and other demonstrators continually parade around, chanting the rosary. The British warden allows two "nuns", one of them claiming to be Curran's grieving "sister", to visit him briefly; the false sister (an American citizen) swaps clothes and places with Curran in his cell while the lights have gone out during a deliberately staged power outage. Unsuspecting Police Sergeant Michael O'Hara helps the pair exit into a waiting carriage. He notices that one is wearing high heels, but thinks little of it. When the executioner comes, Curran's false sister is revealed, but as an American, she is immune from arrest.

The city is immediately sealed off as the manhunt for the fugitive begins. O'Hara is assigned to watch a section of the waterfront and daydreams of what he could do with the £500 bounty. Already conflicted by divided loyalties, he is visited by his overtly nationalistic wife. Then, fugitive Curran shows up in the evening disguised as itinerant ballad singer Jimmy Walsh. O'Hara is suspicious and has him sing; Curran chooses the patriotic "The Rising of the Moon". Despite his unconvincing rendition, he manages to slip away on a boat sent for him while O'Hara bickers with his wife. When the policeman sees Curran getting away, he starts to raise the alarm, then reconsiders and starts singing "The Rising of the Moon" himself.

== Cast ==
- Tyrone Power as Introducer

=== The Majesty of the Law ===
- Cyril Cusack as Inspector Dillon
- Noel Purcell as Dan O'Flaherty
- Jack MacGowran as Mickey J.
- John Cowley as Phelim O'Feeney
- Paul Farrell and Eric Gorman as the neighbours

=== A Minute's Wait ===
- Jimmy O'Dea as Paddy Morrisey, the porter
- Tony Quinn as Mr. Roark, the station master
- J. G. Devlin as Mr. Moran, the guard
- Maureen Potter as Pegeen Mallory
- Paul Farrell as Mr. O'Brien, the train engineer
- Harold Goldblatt as Barney Domigan, a matchmaking father
- May Craig as Mrs. Falsey, a matchmaking aunt
- Godfrey Quigley as Christy Domigan
- Maureen Connell as Mary Ann McMahon
- Michael Trubshawe as Colonel Frobisher
- Anita Sharp-Bolster as Mrs. Frobisher
- Anne D'Alton as Fisherwoman
- Michael O'Duffy as The Singer

=== 1921 ===
- Denis O'Dea as Police Sergeant Michael O'Hara
- Eileen Crowe as Police Sergeant's Wife
- Donal Donnelly as Sean Curran
- Maureen Cusack as "Sister Mary Grace"
- Doreen Madden as "Sister Matthias"
- Joseph O'Dea as British Warden
- Maureen Delany as Old Woman
- Frank Lawton as British Officer
- Edward Lexy as Quartermaster Sergeant

== See also ==
- List of American films of 1957
