= The Shell Seekers =

Book by Rosamunde Pilcher

- Author: Rosamunde Pilcher
- Audio read by: Lynn Redgrave; Hannah Gordon; Barbara Rosenblat
- Language: English
- Genre: Fiction
- Set in: England
- Published: 1987
- Publisher: Coronet Books (UK); St. Martin's Press (US)
- Publication place: United Kingdom
- Media type: Print; Digital (Audiobook)
- Pages: 530 pp
- ISBN: 978-0-3120-1058-4
- OCLC: 16830868
- Dewey Decimal: 823.914
- LC Class: PR6066.I38

The Shell Seekers is a 1987 novel by Rosamunde Pilcher. It became one of her most famous best-sellers. It was nominated by the British public in 2003 as one of the top 100 novels in the BBC's Big Read. In Germany the novel is called Die Muschelsucher and was also in the top 100 novels. The novel sold more than five million copies worldwide, and was adapted for the stage and as a film for television twice.

== Plot summary ==
Shifting in time, the novel tells the story of Penelope Keeling, the daughter of unconventional parents (an artist father and his much-younger French wife), examining her past and her relationships with her adult children. When the novel opens, Penelope is in her 60s and has just been discharged from hospital after what was seemingly a heart attack. Penelope's life from young womanhood to the present is revealed in pieces, from her own point of view and those of her children. Much of the forward impetus of the novel involves the work of her father, including a painting called The Shell Seekers, given to Penelope as a wedding present.

Pilcher's novel September includes the character of Noel Keeling, son of Penelope.

== Awards ==
- BBC Big Read top 100 novels (#50) (2003)
- Winner of the Prize for Fiction by the International Catholic Association for Radio and Television (UNDA) - Monte Carlo Television Festival (1990)

== Film, TV or theatrical adaptations ==
=== 1989 ===
This Emmy-nominated television film of the book in the Hallmark Hall of Fame starred Angela Lansbury as Penelope Keeling. Other actors include Anna Carteret, Patricia Hodge and Irene Worth. It was filmed on location in Ibiza, London, Cornwall and the Cotswolds and involved significant changes to Pilcher's original story.

=== 2005 ===
The novel was adapted into a stage play by Terence Brady and Charlotte Bingham. The UK tour started in Spring 2006.

=== 2006 ===
In 2006 the book was made into a mini-series starring Vanessa Redgrave as Penelope Keeling. It was filmed in Cornwall with scenes shot at St Michael’s Mount, Lamorna, Port Isaac and Prideaux Place at Padstow, directed by Piers Haggard. Other cast members included Sebastian Koch, Maximilian Schell, Victoria Hamilton, and Stephanie Stumph.

== Audio ==
The Shell Seekers was also released as an abridged audio book read by Lynn Redgrave. An unabridged audio book, read by Hannah Gordon is also available. Another unabridged version of audio book, read by Barbara Rosenblat, was published by Recorded Books, Inc., in U.S.A. In 2017, Macmillian Audio released an unabridged audiobook read by Hayley Atwell.

The novel was dramatised for BBC Radio 4 in 2024 by Lin Coghlan, starring Emma Fielding as Penelope and narrated by Jessica Turner.
