= Rosamunde Pilcher =

British novelist (1924–2019)

Rosamunde Pilcher OBE
- Born: Rosamunde Evelina Montague Laurence Scott; 22 September 1924; Lelant, Cornwall, England
- Died: 6 February 2019 (aged 94); Longforgan, Scotland
- Occupation: Novelist
- Spouse: Graham Hope Pilcher (m. 1946; died 2009)
- Children: 4, including Robin Pilcher
- Writing career
- Pen name: Jane Fraser
- Language: English
- Period: 1949–2000
- Genre: Romance
- Notable work: The Shell Seekers
- Notable awards: RoNA Award

Rosamunde Evelina Montague Laurence Pilcher (née Scott; 22 September 1924 – 6 February 2019) was a British novelist, best known for her sweeping novels set in Cornwall. Her books have sold over 60 million copies worldwide. Early in her career her work was published under the pen name of Jane Fraser.

== Early and personal life ==
Born on 22 September 1924 in Lelant, Cornwall, Pilcher began life as Rosamunde Scott, a daughter of Helen (née Harvey) and Charles Scott, a British civil servant. Just before her birth, her father was posted to Burma, while her mother remained in England. She began writing when she was seven and was educated at the School of St. Clare in Penzance and Howell's School, Llandaff, before going on to Miss Kerr-Sanders' Secretarial College. During the Second World War, she joined the Women's Royal Naval Service and spent two years at the Whale Island Royal Gunnery School, from where she was posted to Trincomalee in Ceylon. There, aged 19, after many rejections, she sold a short story to Woman & Home magazine for 15 guineas.

Pilcher served with the Women's Royal Naval Service from 1943 to 1946. On 7 December 1946, she married Graham Hope Pilcher, a war hero and jute industry executive who died in March 2009. They moved to Dundee, Scotland. They had two daughters and two sons. Her son, Robin Pilcher, is also a novelist.

Pilcher died on 6 February 2019, at the age of 94, following a stroke.

== Writing career ==
In 1949, Pilcher's first book, a romance novel, was published by Mills and Boon, under the pseudonym Jane Fraser. She published a further ten novels under that name. In 1955, she also began writing under her real name with Secret to Tell. By 1965 she had dropped the pseudonym and was signing her own name to all of her novels.

A breakthrough in Pilcher's career came in 1987, when she wrote the family saga The Shell Seekers, her fourteenth novel under her own name. It focuses on an elderly British woman, Penelope Keeling, who relives her life in flashbacks, and on her relationship with her adult children. Keeling's life was not extraordinary, but it spans "a time of huge importance and change in the world." The novel describes the everyday details of what life during World War II was like for some of those who lived in Britain. The Shell Seekers sold around ten million copies and was translated into more than forty languages. It was adapted for the stage by Terence Brady and Charlotte Bingham. Pilcher was said to be among the highest-earning women in Britain by the mid-1990s.

Her other major novels include September (1990), Coming Home (1995) and Winter Solstice (2000). Coming Home won the Romantic Novel of the Year Award by Romantic Novelists' Association in 1996. The president of the association in 2019, the romance writer Katie Fforde, considers Pilcher to be "groundbreaking as she was the first to bring family sagas to the wider public". Felicity Bryan, in her obituary for The Guardian, writes that Pilcher took the romance genre to "an altogether higher, wittier level"; she praises Pilcher's work for its "grittiness and fearless observation" and comments that it is often more prosaic than romantic. In 2001, she received the Corine Literature Prize's Weltbild Readers' Prize for Winter Solstice.

Pilcher retired from writing in 2000. Two years later, in the 2002 New Year Honours, she was appointed an Officer of the Order of the British Empire (OBE) for services to literature. That same year she was awarded the British Tourism Award for the positive effect the books and the adaptations have had on Cornish tourism.

== TV adaptations ==
Her books are especially popular in Germany because the national television station ZDF (Zweites Deutsches Fernsehen) has produced more than a hundred of her stories as TV movies, starting with The Day of the Storm in 1993. A complete list can be found on the German Wikipedia: Rosamunde Pilcher (Filmreihe). These television films are some of the most popular programmes on ZDF. Notable film locations include Prideaux Place, a 16th-century mansion near Padstow.

- A television adaptation of The Shell Seekers (dir. Waris Hussein), starring Angela Lansbury, was made in 1989.
- September (directed by Colin Bucksey, 1996), starring Jacqueline Bisset, Michael York, Edward Fox, Jenny Agutter and Mariel Hemingway
- A two-part television adaptation of Coming Home (dir. Giles Foster), made by LWT, was broadcast in 1998, starring Keira Knightley, Emily Mortimer, Peter O'Toole, Joanna Lumley, Penelope Keith, David McCallum, Paul Bettany, Patrick Ryecart and Susan Hampshire, among others.
- Nancherrow (dir. Simon Langton, 1999), starring Joanna Lumley, Patrick Macnee and Senta Berger
- Winter Solstice (dir. Martyn Friend, 2003), starring Sinéad Cusack, Peter Ustinov, Jean Simmons and Geraldine Chaplin
- Summer Solstice (dir. Giles Foster, 2005), starring Jacqueline Bisset, Honor Blackman and Franco Nero
- The Shell Seekers (dir. Piers Haggard, 2006), starring Vanessa Redgrave and Maximilian Schell
- Four Seasons (dir. Giles Foster, 2008), starring Tom Conti, Senta Berger, Michael York, Franco Nero, Juliet Mills and Frank Finlay
- Rosamunde Pilcher's Shades of Love (dir. Giles Foster, 2010), starring Charles Dance
- The Other Wife (dir. Giles Foster, 2012), starring Rupert Everett
- Unknown Heart (dir. Giles Foster, 2014), starring Greg Wise, James Fox, Jane Seymour and Julian Sands
- Valentine's Kiss (dir. Sarah Harding, 2015), starring Rupert Graves and John Hannah

== Selected works ==
=== Novels ===
==== As Jane Fraser ====
- Half-Way to the Moon (1949)
- The Brown Fields (1951)
- Dangerous Intruder (1951)
- Young Bar (1952)
- A Day Like Spring (1953)
- Dear Tom (1954)
- Bridge of Corvie (1956)
- A Family Affair (1958)
- A Long Way from Home (1963)
- The Keeper's House (1963)

==== As Rosamunde Pilcher ====
- A Secret to Tell (1955)
- On My Own (1965)
- Sleeping Tiger (1967)
- Another View (1969)
- The End of Summer (1971)
- Snow in April (1972)
- The Empty House (1973)
- The Day of the Storm (1975)
- Under Gemini (1977)
- Wild Mountain Thyme (1979)
- The Carousel (1982)
- Voices in Summer (1984)
- The Shell Seekers (1987)
- September (1990)
- Coming Home (1995)
- Winter Solstice (2000)

=== Short-story collections ===
- The Blue Bedroom and Other Stories (1985)
- Flowers in the Rain: And Other Stories (1991)
- The Key (1996)
- A Place Like Home (2021)

=== Non-fiction ===
- The World of Rosamunde Pilcher (1996) (autobiography)
- Christmas with Rosamunde Pilcher (1997)
