= No, Honestly =

- Genre: Sitcom
- Written by: Charlotte Bingham; Terence Brady
- Starring: John Alderton; Pauline Collins
- Country of origin: United Kingdom
- Original language: English
- No. of series: 1
- No. of episodes: 13

Production
- Producer: Humphrey Barclay
- Running time: 30 minutes
- Production company: London Weekend Television

Original release
- Network: ITV
- Release: 4 October 1974 – 5 January 1975

Related
- Yes, Honestly

No - Honestly is a British television sitcom which starred real-life married couple John Alderton and Pauline Collins as Charles ("C.D.") Danby and Claira Burrell. It depicted their meeting and courtship up to their first wedding anniversary. It aired on ITV from 4 October 1974 to 5 January 1975. It also aired on PBS in the United States in 1975. The theme song, similarly titled "No, Honestly", was written and performed by Lynsey de Paul.

A subsequent television series titled Yes, Honestly aired on ITV from 9 January 1976 and 23 April 1977, starring Liza Goddard and Donal Donnelly as sweethearts Lily and Matthew Browne who marry halfway through the second series.

== Episodes ==
- "The Facts of Life"
- "The Object of the Game"
- "More Royle Than Noble Really"
- "Finding the Form"
- "Guess Who's Coming to Dinner"
- "Just Cause or Impediment"
- "Now We Are Married"
- "Everything in the Garden"
- "Having Them Back"
- "Plenty of Shoulder Not Much Wheel"
- "Bed, Beautiful Bed"
- "Only Make Believe"
- "Surprise, Surprise!"

== Home video ==
In 1999 Acorn Media released two VHS box sets of the series in the US and Canada. The first set contained the first seven episodes of the series, while the second set contained the remaining six.

In 2010, Network released the complete series of No - Honestly in the UK on Region 2 DVD.
