= Take Three Girls =

British comedy-drama television series (1969–1971)

- Carolyn Seymour (left), Liza Goddard (centre) and Barra Grant – the leading players in series two – outside Holland Park tube station
- Genre: Comedy-drama
- Written by: Charlotte Bingham; Terence Brady; Hugo Charteris; Julia Jones; Carey Harrison (s2); Robert Muller (s2)
- Directed by: Tristan de Vere Cole; Mark Cullingham; John Matthews; Michael Hayes
- Starring: Liza Goddard; Angela Down (s1); Susan Jameson (s1); Carolyn Seymour (s2); Barra Grant (s2)
- Theme music composer: Pentangle
- Opening theme: "Light Flight"
- Country of origin: United Kingdom
- Original language: English
- No. of series: 2
- No. of episodes: 24 (14 missing)

Production
- Producers: Michael Hayes; Verity Lambert
- Production locations: London, England, United Kingdom
- Running time: 50 minutes
- Production company: BBC

Original release
- Network: BBC1
- Release: 17 November 1969 – 1 January 1971

Related
- Take Three Women (1982)

Take Three Girls is a British comedy-drama television series that aired on BBC1 from 17 November 1969 to 1 January 1971. It follows three young women sharing a flat in "Swinging London" (located at 17 Glazbury Road, West Kensington, W14). It was BBC1's first colour drama series.

The first series features cellist Victoria (Liza Goddard), single mother Kate (Susan Jameson), and Cockney art student Avril (Angela Down). For the second series, Kate and Avril were replaced by journalist Jenny (Carolyn Seymour) and American psychology graduate Lulie (Barra Grant).

Two series, each of 12 episodes, were shown on BBC1 between 1969 and 1971, with selected repeats between the series. Only 10 episodes of the original 24 still exist.

A four-episode sequel, Take Three Women, broadcast on BBC2 in 1982, shows the original three characters later in their lives. Victoria is a widow with a young daughter, and Avril an art gallery owner, while Kate is sharing her life with her son and his teacher.

The theme music – "Light Flight" by the British folk rock group Pentangle – was a British chart hit in February 1970. Pentangle also contributed music to Take Three Women.

A tie-in novel, Victoria, by scriptwriters Terence Brady and Charlotte Bingham, was published in 1972 by W. H. Allen Ltd.

== Episodes ==
All episodes were made on colour videotape, with the exception of Season 1, episode 10, which was shot entirely on 35mm film.

=== Take Three Girls - Season 1 ===
Ep	Title	Writer	Director	UK Transmission dates	Archive
1	Kate: Stop Acting	Hugo Charteris	Tristan de Vere Cole	17 November 1969, BBC1; 3 June 1970, BBC2	Colour 625-line VT
2	Avril: Devon Violets	Julia Jones	John Matthews	24 November 1969, BBC1; 15 September 1982, BBC2	Colour 625-line VT
3	Victoria: Requiem For Cello in SW3	Charlotte Bingham and Terence Brady	Mark Cullingham	1 December 1969, BBC1	Lost
4	Kate: Start Working	Hugo Charteris	Tristan de Vere Cole	8 December 1969, BBC1	Colour 625-line VT
5	Avril: Heart's Ease	Julia Jones	John Matthews	15 December 1969, BBC1	Lost
6	Victoria: Rhapsody for Misplaced Persons	Charlotte Bingham and Terence Brady	Mark Cullingham	22 December 1969, BBC1	Lost
7	Kate: Try Loving	Hugo Charteris	Tristan de Vere Cole	29 December 1969, BBC1	Lost
8	Avril: Sweet Basil	Julia Jones	John Matthews	5 January 1970, BBC1	Lost
9	Victoria: Variations of May and September	Charlotte Bingham and Terence Brady	Mark Cullingham	12 January 1970, BBC1; 10 June 1970, BBC2	Colour 625-line VT
10	Kate: Keep Hoping	Hugo Charteris	Tristan de Vere Cole	19 January 1970, BBC1; 17 June 1970, BBC2	Colour 35mm film
11	Avril: Roses Round the Door	Julia Jones	John Matthews	26 January 1970, BBC1	Colour 625-line VT
12	Victoria: Gloria for First Offence	Charlotte Bingham and Terence Brady	Mark Cullingham	2 February 1970, BBC1	Lost

=== Take Three Girls - Season 2 ===
Ep	Title	Writer	Director	UK Transmission dates	Archive
1	Victoria: Coda and Resolution	Charlotte Bingham and Terence Brady	Mark Cullingham	24 March 1971, BBC1	Lost
2	Lulie: The Private Sector	Carey Harrison	Barry Davis	31 March 1971, BBC1	Colour 625-line VT
3	Jenny: Closed Circuit	Robert Muller	Michael Hayes	7 April 1971, BBC1	Lost
4	Victoria: Duet for Two Left Feet	Charlotte Bingham and Terence Brady	Mark Cullingham	14 April 1971, BBC1	Lost
5	Lulie: The Company of Madmen	Carey Harrison	Barry Davis	21 April 1971, BBC1	Lost
6	Jenny: Kitsch, or Protocols in a Chinese Laundry	Robert Muller	Michael Hayes	28 April 1971, BBC1	Colour 625-line VT
7	Victoria: Prelude to a New Arrangement	Charlotte Bingham and Terence Brady	Mark Cullingham	7 May 1971, BBC1	Lost
8	Lulie: A Little Blindness	Carey Harrison	Barry Davis	14 May 1971, BBC1	Lost
9	Jenny: Freelance	Robert Muller	Michael Hayes	21 May 1971, BBC1	Lost
10	Victoria: Composition Out of Discord	Charlotte Bingham and Terence Brady	Mark Cullingham	28 May 1971, BBC1	Lost
11	Lulie: A School for Grievances	Carey Harrison	Christopher Morahan	4 June 1971, BBC1	Colour 625-line VT
12	Jenny: Release	Robert Muller	Michael Hayes	11 June 1971, BBC1	Colour 625-line VT

=== Take Three Women ===
Ep	Title	Writer	Director	UK Transmission dates	Archive
1	Kate	Huy Meredith	Richard Martin	21 September 1982, BBC2	Colour 625-line VT
2	Avril	Julia Jones	Roger Bamford	28 September 1982, BBC2	Colour 625-line VT
3	Victoria	Charlotte Bingham and Terence Brady	Les Chatfield	5 October 1982, BBC2	Colour 625-line VT
4	Victoria, Kate and Avril	Lee Langley	Julian Amyes	12 October 1982, BBC2	Colour 625-line VT
