= The Shell Seekers (1989 film) =

1989 film by Waris Hussein

- Based on: The Shell Seekers by Rosamunde Pilcher
- Directed by: Waris Hussein
- Starring: Angela Lansbury; Irene Worth; Sam Wanamaker
- Music by: James Di Pasquale
- Country of origin: United States
- Original language: English

Production
- Executive producers: Ted Childs; Marian Rees
- Producers: Emma Hayter; William Hill; Anne Hopkins
- Running time: 99 minutes
- Production companies: Central Independent Television; Marian Rees Associates; Hallmark Hall of Fame

Original release
- Network: ABC
- Release: December 3, 1989
- Network: ITV
- Release: December 21, 1989

The Shell Seekers is a 1989 Hallmark Hall of Fame made-for-television drama film based on the 1987 novel of the same name by Rosamunde Pilcher and starring Angela Lansbury. The film aired on ABC on December 3, 1989, in the United States and on ITV on December 21, 1989, in the United Kingdom; it was later reaired on CBS on January 31, 1993.

== Plot ==
Penelope Keeling, a mother of three adult children, reconsiders her priorities when faced with the prospect of exchanging her most treasured possession for financial security. Reflecting on her life, she recalls the happiness she experienced as a child playing on the beach and revisits events from her past to understand what matters most to her and those around her.

== Cast ==
- Angela Lansbury as Penelope Keeling
- Irene Worth as Dolly Keeling
- Sam Wanamaker as Richard
- Patricia Hodge as Olivia
- Anna Carteret as Nancy
- Sophie Ward as Antonia
- Denis Quilley as Cosmo
- Serena Gordon as Annabel
- Michael Gough as Roy Brookner

== Production ==
The Shell Seekers was filmed on location in Cornwall, the Cotswolds, Ibiza and in a studio in Shepperton, England.

== See also ==
- The Shell Seekers (2006)
