= Liza Goddard =

English television and stage actress (born 1950)

- Born: Louise Elizabeth Goddard; 20 January 1950 (age 76); Smethwick, Staffordshire, England
- Occupation: Actress
- Years active: 1966–present
- Spouses: Colin Baker (m. 1976; div. 1978); Alvin Stardust (m. 1981; div. 1989); David Cobham (m. 1995; died 2018)
- Children: 2
- Website: https://lizagoddard.co.uk

Louise Elizabeth Goddard (born 20 January 1950), professionally known as Liza Goddard, is an English television and stage actress, best known for her work in the 1970s and 1980s.

== Early life ==
Goddard was born in Smethwick, Staffordshire, but spent most of her early years in Surrey. She is the oldest daughter of David Goddard (1925–1992), who produced and directed numerous TV shows and programmes, and his wife Clare. Goddard's younger sister is Maria.

Her parents met in Germany. Clare trained in rep, and appeared in television adverts. They lived at Heath End, Surrey then at 10 Weybourne Rd in Weybourne, Surrey, and in Frensham, then 'Huffins' in Tilford. Maria and Liza performed in the Junior Tilford Players.

She attended Farnham Girls' Grammar School, before her father moved the family to Sydney, when she was 15 in April 1965, upon his appointment as Head of Drama at the Australian Broadcasting Corporation.

== Career ==
Goddard made early television appearances in Australia, including in the ABC anthology TV series Wednesday Theatre playing Eurydice in "Point of Departure" and the title role in "Antigone" She appeared in another ABC anthology series Love and War, playing Juliet in "Romeo and Juliet", the first Australian TV presentation of Shakespeare's play. She was also in episode 100 of Homicide ("The Traveller", 1967) and had a brief (non-speaking, uncredited) appearance in the feature film They're A Weird Mob (1966).

However, she is best remembered in Australia for her role as Clarissa "Clancy" Merrick in Skippy the Bush Kangaroo, in which she appeared in the first two series and 48 episodes between 1968-70.

After returning to the UK in 1969 as an adult, she was cast as Victoria Edgecombe, the character created by Terence Brady and Charlotte Bingham in Take Three Girls (1969), later appearing in its sequel Take Three Women (1982). She also had a supporting role in the 1972 comedy film Ooh… You Are Awful, starring Dick Emery. Her career breakthrough was as April in The Brothers (1972–76), which also featured her first husband, Colin Baker.

A comedy role alongside Donal Donnelly in Yes, Honestly (1976–77), by Terence Brady and Charlotte Bingham followed, as did a role with Christopher Biggins in a BBC1 sitcom Watch This Space (1980), by Ronald Chesney and Ronald Wolfe. Later the same year, she also appeared as Jocelyn in "National Pelmet", the Series 2 opener of the ITV drama Minder. This was followed by Pig in the Middle (1980–83) written by Terence Brady and Charlotte Bingham.

Goddard was one of the 'explorers' who were 'evaporated' in a (now missing) episode of the BBC science fiction quiz programme The Adventure Game (1980), played a space pirate in the Doctor Who story Terminus (1983), and appeared in Roll Over Beethoven (1985), opposite Nigel Planer. She later had a recurring role as Philippa Vale in Bergerac (featuring in four series between 1984 and 1989).

Goddard played a humanist in the 1987 biographical film Testimony, starring Ben Kingsley.

The following year, she played Barbara Colport in the Tales of the Unexpected (TV series) episode #9.6 "Wink Three Times" (1988). She then appeared in Woof!, a Children's ITV programme first broadcast in 1989. Her third husband, producer and director David Cobham, created this series. She had earlier appeared in the TV adaptation of Brendon Chase (1981), also produced and directed by Cobham.

She was the subject of This Is Your Life in 1984 when she was surprised by Eamonn Andrews at the Ambassador's Theatre in London for the shows recording nearby, at the Regent Theatre. Between 1988-92, she was the female team leader on the long-running quiz/panel show Give Us A Clue, replacing Una Stubbs in the role.

In 1990, Goddard appeared as Laurel Manasotti in the ITV sitcom That's Love.

Goddard appeared as Gilly in Wild West (2002), alongside Dawn French and Catherine Tate. In 2007 she appeared in the Midsomer Murders episode "A Picture of Innocence", reuniting her with Bergerac star John Nettles. In 2012 she had a cameo role in the all-star comedy film Run for Your Wife, and in 2013 she toured with the official Agatha Christie Theatre Company in Go Back for Murder, an adaptation of the book Five Little Pigs.

In September 2016, Goddard played the guest role of Gloria Francis in the BBC1 drama series Casualty. In March 2023 she again appeared in Casualty, this time playing Christine Robinson in the series 37 episode "No Regrets". In July 2023 Goddard was announced as taking the role of Dotty Otley in a national tour of Michael Frayn's farce Noises Off, directed by Lindsay Posner, following its run at the Phoenix Theatre, London.

== Personal life ==
Goddard's first marriage was to Doctor Who actor Colin Baker.

In 1981 she married Bernard William Jewry, the pop star Alvin Stardust.

Prior to Goddard's third marriage (1995) to producer and director David Cobham, Goddard was credited with helping to rescue Queen Elizabeth II's Range Rover and horse box that had got stuck in the mud near Holkham in 1994.

In 2004, Goddard was locked in a giant kennel with MPs Paul Burstow, Evan Harris and Ivan Henderson and BBC Newsround presenter Lizzie Greenwood, TV presenter Liz Bonnin and DJ Becky Jago in a stunt to launch the annual RSPCA Week to raise awareness and funds.

As of 2021, she lives near Dereham, Norfolk, and works with the RSPCA, amongst other charities. She recovered from breast cancer in 1997. She has two children.

== Selected filmography ==
Year	Title	Role	Notes
1966	They're a Weird Mob	Young Woman on Ferry	Film (uncredited)
1966	Wednesday Theatre	Eurydice	Episode: "Point of Departure"
1966	Wednesday Theatre	Antigone	Episode: "Antigone"
1967	Homicide	Jenny Craig	Episode: "The Traveller"
1967	Love and War	Juliet	Episode: "Romeo and Juliet"
1968–1970	Skippy the Bush Kangaroo	Clarissa "Clancy" Merrick	67 episodes
1969–1971	Take Three Girls	Victoria	24 episodes
1972	Ooh... You Are Awful	Liza Misseden-Green	Film
1976	The Brothers	April	16 episodes
1976–1977	Yes, Honestly	Lily Pond-Browne	26 episodes
1978	Crown Court	Carolina Wallis	3 episodes
1978	Wodehouse Playhouse	Lady Geraldine Spettisbury	Story: "The Luck of the Stiffhams"
1980	Minder	Joceyln	Episode: "National Pelmet"
1980	Watch This Space	Claire	6 episodes
1980–1983	Pig in the Middle	Nellie Bligh	20 episodes
1981	Brendon Chase	Monica Hurling	8 episodes
1982	Take Three Women	Victoria	2 episodes
1983	Doctor Who	Kari	Serial: "Terminus" (4 episodes)
1983	Wagner	Jessie Lausott	1 episode (mini-series)
1983–1989	Bergerac	Phillipa Vale	6 episodes
1985	Roll Over Beethoven	Belinda Purcell	13 episodes
1987	Testimony	The English Humanist	Film
1988	Tales of the Unexpected	Barbara Colport	Story: "Wink Three Times"
1989–1997	Woof!	Mrs. Jessop	63 episodes
1990	That's Love	Laurel	6 episodes
1997–2001	Bernard's Watch	Narrator (voice)	44 episodes
2002	Wild West	Gilly	2 episodes
2006	Doctors	Penny Dates	Episode: "Too Soon"
2007	Midsomer Murders	Marion Bell	Episode: "Picture of Innocence"
2009–2014	Grandpa in My Pocket	Lady Prigsbottom	3 episodes
2012	Run for Your Wife	Exercising Woman	Film
2016–2023	Casualty	Gloria Francis/ Christine Robinson	2 episodes

=== Theatre ===
Year	Title	Role	Venue	Ref.
2026	The Mirror Crack’d	Miss Marple	The Mill at Sonning	https://millatsonning.com/Events/the-mirror-crackd/
