= Julia Jones (dramatist) =

British television writer (1923–2015)

- Born: Julia Marian Jones; 27 March 1923; West Derby, Liverpool, England, UK
- Died: 9 October 2015 (aged 92); Painswick, Gloucestershire, England
- Education: Royal Academy of Dramatic Art
- Occupations: playwright, screenwriter, novelist
- Spouse(s): William Harold Emmerson (m. 1949); Edmond Bennett (m. 1950; d. 1986); Derek Ballance (m. 2006; d. 2015)
- Children: 2
- Writing career
- Notable work: Take Three Girls

Julia Marian Jones (27 March 1923 – 9 October 2015) was a British television scriptwriter and former actress.

== Early life and career ==
Born in Liverpool suburb West Derby on 27 March 1923, and raised in Everton, Jones was one of four children born to Eva (née Collins) and Harvey Sykes Jones. After her mother's death in 1933, the family moved to Aintree, where she attended Queen Mary High School for girls, making her stage debut in a school production of William Housman's Bethlehem. After earning her school certificate in 1938, Jones was employed as a wages clerk by the Dunlop Rubber Company and, shortly thereafter, joined the Auxiliary Territorial Service.

Jones began her career as a television writer in 1965. Her works include the adaptation of Quiet as a Nun (1978) for the Armchair Thriller series; the BBC's Miss Marple series; the pilot episode of ITV's Wycliffe (1993); a serial dramatisation of the novel, Anne of Green Gables (with Donald Churchill, 1972); the comedy-drama, Moody and Pegg (also with Donald Churchill, 1974-75); Our Mutual Friend (1976); and Tom's Midnight Garden (1989).

== Personal life and death ==
Jones married at least three times: briefly, in 1949, to musician William Harold Emmerson; from 1950 until his death in 1986, to fellow actor Edmond Bennett, with whom Jones had a daughter, Thea, and son, Harvey, and from 2006 until his death nine years later, to Derek Ballance.

On 9 October 2015, predeceased in February by Ballard, Jones died, aged 92, survived by the two children from her second marriage and by two grandchildren.
