= Jemima Shore Investigates =

- Genre: Mystery
- Created by: Antonia Fraser
- Starring: Patricia Hodge; Sally Watts
- Composer: Richard Hartley
- Country of origin: United Kingdom
- Original language: English
- No. of series: 1
- No. of episodes: 12

Production
- Producer: Tim Aspinall
- Running time: 60 minutes
- Production company: Thames Television

Original release
- Network: ITV
- Release: 8 June – 24 August 1983

Jemima Shore Investigates is a British mystery television series which originally aired in twelve episodes in 1983. It is based on a series of novels by Antonia Fraser about Jemima Shore, a crime-solving television presenter.

Actors who appeared in episodes of the series include Anthony Steel, Constance Cummings, Lysette Anthony, Stratford Johns, Patrick Newell, Tom Baker, Malcolm Stoddard, Michael Balfour, Billy Milton, Hugh Burden, Oliver Cotton, Don Henderson, Bill Nighy, Zena Walker, Brian Cox, Donald Houston, Larry Lamb, Brian Oulton, Derek Francis, Nicholas Le Prevost, George Coulouris and Elizabeth Counsell.

== Main cast ==
- Patricia Hodge as Jemima Shore
- Sally Watts as Cherry Bronson
- Ian Hendry as Cy
- Norman Jones as Pompey
- Kathleen Worth as Mrs. Bancroft

== Bibliography ==
- Mitzi Brunsdale. Gumshoes: A Dictionary of Fictional Detectives. Greenwood Publishing Group, 2006.
