= Jemima Shore at the Sunny Grave =

Short story collection

Jemima Shore at the Sunny Grave And Other Stories
- First edition
- Author: Antonia Fraser
- Language: English
- Publisher: Bloomsbury Publishing
- Publication date: 1991

Jemima Shore at the Sunny Grave And Other Stories is a book by Antonia Fraser. First published in 1991, it is a collection of nine short stories, featuring series character Jemima Shore. It includes such settings as the Caribbean and the Mediterranean. The book includes murderous drama, black comedy, and a maniacal rapist.
