= Romeo and Juliet (Love and War) =

- Love and War episode
- Episode no.: Season 1 Episode 6
- Directed by: Oscar Whitbread
- Teleplay by: Alan Cole
- Based on: Romeo and Juliet by William Shakespeare
- Original air date: 18 October 1967
- Running time: 100 mins

Episode chronology
← Previous "Construction"	Next → "Cathy Come Home"

"Romeo and Juliet" is a 1967 Australian TV play based on the play by William Shakespeare. It was presented as part of the Love and War anthology series on the ABC.

== Premise ==
In the Italian town of Verona, Romeo and Juliet are teenagers from feuding families who fall in love.

== Cast ==
- Sean Scully as Romeo
- Liza Goddard as Juliet
- Syd Conabere as Friar Laurence
- Robin Ramsay as Mercutio
- David Turnbull as Tybalt
- Jennifer Claire
- Joseph James
- Joan Harris as nurse

== Production ==
It was the first Australian TV presentation of the play and featured a cast of over fifty. "Using young actors makes the story more acceptable," said director Oscar Whitbread. "The basic thing with teenagers is that they tend to become isolated from their parents and society when they fall in love. But do we, as adults, understand the purity of their love?"

It was filmed in Melbourne. The production was announced in July and rehearsals began in September. The adaptation was by Alan Cole of Melbourne University. Whitbread claimed that "Alan Cole has adapted it beautifully."

== Reception ==
The Age called it "a really splendid achievement."

The Sydney Morning Herald said the production "will not need to be kept for generations ungotten and unborn...listening was like reading with every line spaced out. Sean Scully and Liza Goddard were looking as though they wanted to play it in jeans... The production lacked creative direction."
