= Oxford Blood =

1985 novel by Antonia Fraser

- First edition
- Author: Antonia Fraser
- Language: English
- Series: Jemima Shore Mysteries
- Genre: Mystery novel
- Publisher: Weidenfeld & Nicolson (UK); W. W. Norton (USA)
- Publication date: 6 June 1985
- Publication place: United Kingdom
- Media type: Print (Hardback & Paperback)
- Pages: 208 pp (hardback edition); 224 pp (US paperback edition)
- ISBN: 0-297-78606-7 (hardback edition); ISBN 0-393-31824-9 (US paperback edition)
- OCLC: 11666793
- Preceded by: Cool Repentance
- Followed by: Jemima Shore's First Case

Oxford Blood is a crime novel by Antonia Fraser first published in 1985.

The novel begins with reporter Jemima Shore making a television documentary at Oxford University. Most prominent among the undergraduates is Lord Saffron, a wealthy, twenty-year-old heir to a former (British) Foreign Secretary. Soon she discovers that there is a mystery about Lord Saffron's birth and bloodline, based on the confession of a dying midwife. Later another undergraduate is murdered, and a series of attempts are made to kill Saffron, including a night-time attack while punting on the River Thames.
