= Ooh I Do =

1974 song performed by Lynsey de Paul

Single by Lynsey de Paul
- B-side: "Nothing Really Lasts Forever"
- Released: 17 May 1974
- Studio: ATV Music
- Genre: Pop rock
- Length: 3:31
- Label: Warner Bros.
- Songwriters: Lynsey de Paul and Barry Blue
- Producer: Lynsey de Paul

Lynsey de Paul singles chronology
"Won't Somebody Dance with Me" (1973)	"Ooh I Do" (1974)	"No, Honestly" (1974)

"Ooh I Do" is the fifth single released by Lynsey de Paul on 17 May 1974 and her only single released on the Warner Bros. label, after moving there from MAM Records. Co-written by de Paul and Barry Blue, this Phil Spector-ish song with a nod to the style of the Roy Wood/Wizzard sound, conveys the angst about parents not believing in a teenage love affair represented a change of style for de Paul, who also produced the recording. De Paul performed the song on TV shows in Spain and Germany, however, her only UK performance was for Top of the Pops, but this was never shown because of industrial action at the BBC. De Paul re-recorded the song for this episode and this version was released on the BBC Transcription Services album, Top Of The Pops-495, which also featured an interview conducted by Brian Matthews.

== History ==
Together with "Sugar Me" it was her biggest hit in Japan. In the UK, some copies were mis-pressed with the B-side label appearing as "Ten Years After on Strawberry Jam" by The Scaffold, that also appeared on the Warner Bros label, although the track that plays is "Nothing Really Lasts Forever" (K 16400), also sung, composed and produced by de Paul. According to Barry Blue, "Ooh I Do" is the only song he and de Paul co-wrote that they fell out over - Blue wanted to release his version of the song as a single but de Paul recorded it first.

== Chart performance ==
It was a hit in the UK Singles Chart (number 25), and in corresponding charts in Belgium, the Netherlands and Brazil. It reached number 13 on the Capital countdown chart and number 20 on the NME chart. The song was also a hit in Sweden where it spent two weeks on the Poporama chart. It was ranked 50th best single of 1974 by Joepie, a Flemish hit list that was published in the youth magazine, Joepie, as well as on the Radio Mi Amigo year end chart.

== Other recordings ==
The song has been covered by other artists, notably Barry Blue, albeit it with different lyrics; as well as the Japanese artists Kojima Mayumi, on the album, Jive Bunny Project – Stepping - Spectre Sounds, as well as on her 2015 album Cover Songs, and GML (Girl Meets Love) on their CD GML Meets Union Jack.

== Chart performance ==
Chart (1974)	Peak position
Belgium	12
Brazil	11
Netherlands	16
UK	25
