= The Blue Bedroom and Other Stories =

1985 collection by Rosamunde Pilcher'

- First US edition
- Author: Rosamunde Pilcher
- Publisher: St.Martin's Press
- Publication date: July 27, 1985

The Blue Bedroom is a 1985 short story collection by British writer Rosamunde Pilcher, her first. It consists of 13 stories and has a preface by Lee Quarfoot, who was then fiction editor of Good Housekeeping Magazine.

== The Stories ==
There are 13 stories:

- "Toby"
- "Home for the Day"
- "Spanish Ladies"
- "Miss Cameron at Christmas"
- "Tea with the Professor"
- "Amita"
- "The Blue Bedroom"
- "Gilbert
- "The Before-Christmas Present"
- "The White Birds"
- "The Tree"
- "The House on the Hill"
- "An Evening to Remember"

== Publication history ==
- Pilcher, Rosamunde (1990). The Blue Bedroom and Other Stories. New York: St. Martin's Paperbacks. ISBN 978-0-312-92312-9.

== Adaptation ==
An audiobook was created from the collection called The White Birds and other stories. It was read by Lynn Redgrave.
