= Yes, Honestly =

- Genre: Sitcom
- Created by: Terence Brady; Charlotte Bingham
- Starring: Donal Donnelly; Liza Goddard
- Country of origin: United Kingdom
- Original language: English
- No. of series: 2
- No. of episodes: 26

Production
- Running time: 30 minutes
- Production company: London Weekend Television

Original release
- Network: ITV
- Release: 9 January 1976 – 23 April 1977

Related
- No, Honestly

Yes, Honestly is a British television sitcom that aired on ITV between 9 January 1976 and 23 April 1977. It stars Donal Donnelly as Matthew Browne and Liza Goddard as Lily Pond Browne. The series followed the course of their relationship, from first meeting – when unsuccessful music composer Matthew (affectionately known as Matt), who has little if any time for women, hires Lily Pond, a beautiful and witty woman of Russian ancestry as his typist – to their eventual marriage. It is a sequel to No, Honestly and was written by Terence Brady and Charlotte Bingham and produced by Humphrey Barclay. The theme song for the first series was composed and performed by Georgie Fame, while the second series used an instrumental version of "No, Honestly" written by Lynsey de Paul.

== Cast ==
- Donal Donnelly - Matthew Browne
- Liza Goddard - Lily Browne
- Georgina Melville - June
- David King - Dicky
- Eve Pearce - Lily's mother
- Ian Judge - Hayward
- Michael Burrell - Ronnie
- Irene Hamilton - Mrs Pond
- John Alkin - Tom
- Dudley Jones - Mr Krocski
- Beatrix Lehmann - Lily's Grandmother
- Georgina Hale - Georgina
- Frank Middlemass - Bert
- Georgie Fame - self
- Bella Emberg - Mrs Lawson
- Elizabeth Halliday - Fanny
- Michael Knowles - Manager
