= Jemima Shore =

- First appearance: Quiet as a Nun
- Last appearance: Political Death
- Created by: Antonia Fraser
- Portrayed by: Maria Aitken; Patricia Hodge

In-universe information
- Gender: Female
- Occupation: Investigative journalist
- Nationality: British

Jemima Shore is a fictional character created by Antonia Fraser. A television investigative reporter, she has appeared in a series of crime novels and also within two separate television shows. She was first introduced in the 1977 novel Quiet as a Nun, which was adapted for television as a six-part serial for the ITV anthology series Armchair Thriller in 1978. Further novels were the basis of the 1983 TV series Jemima Shore Investigates.

== Novels ==
- Quiet as a Nun (1977)
- The Wild Island (1978) (later published as Tartan Tragedy)
- A Splash of Red (1981)
- Cool Repentance (1982)
- Oxford Blood (1985)
- Jemima Shore's First Case, and Other Stories (1986; short story collection with 5 JS stories and 8 others)
- Your Royal Hostage (1987)
- The Cavalier Case (1990)
- Jemima Shore at the Sunny Grave (1991)
- Political Death (1995)

== Television ==
Fraser's character has been the basis of two television series which were broadcast in the United Kingdom: the 1978 Armchair Thriller six-part serial Quiet as a Nun with Maria Aitken as Jemima Shore, and a twelve episode omnibus series in 1983, Jemima Shore Investigates, starring Patricia Hodge in the title role. Both series were produced by Thames Television for the ITV network.
