= Quiet as a Nun =

1977 thriller novel by Antonia Fraser

- First US edition
- Author: Antonia Fraser
- Genre: thriller
- Published: 1977
- Publisher: Viking Press

Quiet as a Nun is a thriller novel, written by Antonia Fraser. First published in 1977, it features Fraser's sleuthing heroine Jemima Shore as she revisits the convent school where she was educated following the mysterious death of one of the nuns. A six-part television dramatisation of the book (written by Julia Jones) was part of ITV's anthology series Armchair Thriller in 1978.

== Plot summary ==
The novel begins with the death of a nun, Sister Miriam, who apparently starved herself to death in a ruined tower, known as the 'Tower of Ivory', which adjoins the grounds of the Convent of the Blessed Eleanor, a nunnery and a girls' school.

The tower has specific significance to the Order, as it was the original convent building. The tower and the ancient history of the Order are recorded in the Treasury of the Blessed Eleanor, a manuscript that is referenced throughout the story. Though it is never stated explicitly, Blessed Eleanor is presumed to be Eleanor of Aquitaine, who was once Queen of England.

Television reporter Jemima Shore is a former schoolfriend of Sister Miriam, who was also known as Rosabelle Powerstock and was heiress to "the Powers fortune", one of the largest fortunes in Britain. Jemima is invited back to the convent by Reverend Mother Ancilla, where she uncovers a number of mysteries, including the suggestion that Miriam, whose family owned the convent lands, may have written a second will bequeathing them away from the Order, and into the hands of another charity.

The tension builds when the girls at the convent school tell Jemima that the Black Nun, a malevolent faceless spectre reputed to appear whenever a death is about to take place within the grounds, was seen just prior to Sister Miriam's death, and has been sighted again.
