= No, Honestly (song) =

Song performed by Lynsey de Paul

Single by Lynsey de Paul
- B-side: "Central Park Arrest"
- Released: October 18, 1974
- Genre: Pop
- Length: 3:31
- Label: Jet Records
- Songwriter: Lynsey de Paul
- Producer: Lynsey de Paul

Lynsey de Paul singles chronology
"Ooh I Do" (1974)	"No, Honestly" (1974)	"My Man and Me" (1975)

"No, Honestly" is a song written, performed and produced by Lynsey de Paul, that was the theme for London Weekend Television's comedy series of the same name, although the single release was a slightly different version from that used for the TV theme.

== History ==
The song was the first released on 18 October 1974 on the Jet Records label established by Don Arden. It peaked at No. 7 on the UK Singles Chart, and No. 4 on the Northern Ireland chart at the beginning of December that year. It also climbed to the No. 3 spot on Capitol Radio's Capital Countdown on 23 November 1974, as compiled by the Media Research Information Bureau (MRIB).

The B-side of the single was de Paul's version of "Central Park Arrest"; a hit earlier in the year that she had originally written for the female group, Thunderthighs. In 1975, de Paul received an Ivor Novello Award for Best Theme from a Radio or TV Production. An instrumental version of the song was used as the theme for the second series, Yes, Honestly.

The song still gets airplay on various radio stations around the world, and it was played on Weatherfield Hospital Radio by "DJ Geoff" on the ITV soap opera Coronation Street on 20 July 2020 as well as by "DJ Leonard Brazil" (played by Tim Curry) in the TV version of the play "City Sugar' by Stephen Poliakoff.

== Other recordings ==
It was covered by the Brazilian singer Jeannie, on the various artists album, Discoteca Hippopotamus, in 1975. A Danish version of "No Honestly" was released as a single by Vivian in 1976. The Bruce Baxter Orchestra, The Ray Hartley Orchestra and The Starshine Orchestra have performed versions for albums of famous TV theme songs.
