= September (novel) =

1990 novel by Rosamunde Pilcher

- First edition (UK)
- Author: Rosamunde Pilcher
- Audio read by: Lynn Redgrave
- Language: English
- Publisher: New English Library
- Publication date: 1990
- Publication place: United Kingdom
- Media type: Print
- Preceded by: The Shell Seekers

September is a novel by Rosamunde Pilcher. September was published in 1990, three years after The Shell Seekers. Although one Shell Seekers character, Noel Keeling, is a significant figure, a new cast is introduced.

== Plot ==
Violet Aird is the centre of the novel, the matriarch of the Aird clan, and long-time family friend of Lord Balmerino a.k.a. Archie Blair. The characters of the book all have a problem to overcome, such as jealousy, envy, or greed. Violet watches over them all, but knows she can only watch. Lottie Carstairs, released from the local psychiatric hospital drives Violet's friend (and employee) Edie to distraction - along with everyone else, disagreement over their son's schooling drives parents Edmund and Virginia Aird ever further apart, the Balmerinos are deeply troubled by debt, and into all this, the bewitching and beautiful Pandora Blair, who ran away from home twenty years before, adds her own brand of chaos.

== Film, TV and theatrical adaptations ==
September was made into a mini-series film in 1996, and starred Edward Fox, Michael York, Mariel Hemingway, and Jacqueline Bisset, Jenny Agutter (as Isobel Balmerino), Judy Parfitt (as Verena Steynton).

== Release details ==
September was also released as an audio book, and, like The Shell Seekers and Coming Home, it was read by Lynn Redgrave.
