= Love and War (Australian TV series) =

- Directed by: Patrick Barton; Oscar Whitbread
- Country of origin: Australia
- Original language: English
- No. of episodes: 6

Production
- Producer: John Croyston
- Running time: 90 mins

Original release
- Network: ABC
- Release: 6 September – 11 October 1967

Love and War is a 1967 Australian TV series.

It consists of six plays shot in ABC's Gore Hill studios. All of the self-contained episodes were produced by John Croyston, but not all of them were written by Australian script-writers.

== Man of Destiny by George Bernard Shaw ==
Date: 6 September 1967
Producer: Patrick Barton
It aired in Sydney as part of Wednesday Theatre and ran for 60 minutes.

The play had already been filmed by the ABC in 1963.

=== Cast ===
- Brian Hannan - Napoleon Bonaparte
- Anne Charleston - The Lady
- Dennis Miller - The Lieutenant
- Stanley Page - The Innkeeper

== Serjeant Musgrave's Dance by John Arden ==
Date: 13 September 1967
Director: John Croyston
It aired in Sydney as part of Wednesday Theatre and ran for 90 minutes.

=== Plot ===
An anti-war fanatic falls victim to anarchy of his own making. In England at the end of the 19th century a small group of soldiers, led by the hardest man in the line, goes to a strike bound mining town in the north of England.

=== Cast ===
- Wynn Roberts as Sergeant Musgrave
- Sean Scully
- Richard Meikle
- Edward Hepple
- Michael Boddy
- Don Crosby as Plonko
- Neva Carr Glynn
- Alice Fraser
- Tom Oliver

== O'Flaherty, VC by George Bernard Shaw ==
Date: 20 September 1967
It aired in Sydney as part of Wednesday Theatre and ran for 70 minutes.

=== Cast ===
- Edwin Hodgeman
- Kerry McGuire
- Moray Powell
- Audrey Teasdale

== The Brass Butterfly by William Golding ==
Date: 27 September 1967
Director: John Croyston
It ran for 90 minutes.

=== Premise ===
In Ancient Rome, an emperor reflects on his life.

=== Cast ===
- Peter Collingwood as Emperor
- Ron Graham
- Sue Condon
- Peter Rowley as Maximilus
- Mark Albiston as Postumus
- Alastair Duncan as Phanocles
- Diana Ferris as Euphresne

== Intersection by Michael Boddy ==
Date: 4 October 1967
Director: John Croyston
It aired in Sydney as part of Wednesday Theatre, and ran for 65 minutes.

=== Plot ===
A woman leaves a small town where she has a boyfriend and falls for a guitarist.

=== Cast ===
- Helen Morse
- John Gregg
- Robert McDarra
- Beryl Cheers
- Slim De Grey
- Frank Lloyd
- Ben Gabriel as Fred
- Kit Taylor as Matt

=== Reception ===
The Sydney Morning Herald said: "The cast did what they could with it. Director John Croyston did what he could."

== Construction by John Croyston ==
Date: 11 October 1967
Director: Storry Walton

=== Cast ===
- Ron Graham
- Moya O'Sullivan

== Romeo and Juliet by William Shakespeare ==
See Romeo and Juliet (1967 film)

=== Cast ===
- Sean Scully as Romeo
