= Armchair Thriller =

British television drama series (1978–1980)

- Genre: Horror thriller
- Theme music composer: Andy Mackay
- Country of origin: United Kingdom
- Original language: English
- No. of series: 2
- No. of episodes: 55

Production
- Executive producer: Andrew Brown
- Producers: Andrew Brown; Jacqueline Davis; Brenda Ennisp
- Camera setup: Multi-camera
- Running time: c. 23–26 minutes per episode
- Production companies: Thames Television; Southern Television

Original release
- Network: ITV
- Release: 21 February 1978 – 30 December 1981

Armchair Thriller is a British television drama series broadcast on ITV in 1978 and 1980 in two seasons. Taking the form of a sequence of unconnected serials, scripts for Armchair Thriller were adaptations of published novels and stories. Although not strictly a horror series, it did sometimes include supernatural elements. Armchair Thriller was mainly produced by Thames Television, but it included two serials from Southern Television. The format was of 25-minute episodes broadcast twice-weekly, usually on Tuesdays and Thursdays between 8 pm and 9 pm.

== Overview ==
The opening titles consisted of a shadow-figure walking to an armchair and then sitting down, accompanied by music composed by Andy Mackay of pop group Roxy Music. Some trailers for the series showed the same armchair soaked in blood and a screaming, maniacal face; these received criticism from those who considered them too horrific for pre-watershed viewing. For Armchair Thriller broadcasts, Thames Television changed the station ident it used; normally it showed a London landscape in daytime, but here it was the same view as though seen at night. Ratings reached more than 17 million viewers during the broadcast of the first episode of "The Limbo Connection" in May 1978.

The first series included an adaptation of Antonia Fraser's 1977 novel Quiet as a Nun. This introduced to television the character of Jemima Shore—who was later spun off into her own ITV series—and starred Maria Aitken. "Quiet as a Nun" features a cliffhanger sequence where the 'Black Nun' appeared. Other actors to appear included Ian McKellen and Denis Lawson.

== Episodes ==
=== Series 1 ===
No.	Title	Cast	Directed by	Written by	Production company	Original release date
1	"Rachel in Danger"	Della Low (Rachel), Stephen Greif (Juan), Eiko Nakamura (Aiyako), Neville Jason (Peter), George Waring (Police Sergeant), John Joyce (C.I.D. Sgt.), Harry Littlewood (Caretaker)	Waris Hussein	John Bowen	Thames	21 February 1978
1	"Rachel in Danger"	Della Low (Rachel), Stephen Greif (Juan), Eiko Nakamura (Aiyako), Neville Jason (Peter), George Waring (Police Sergeant), John Joyce (C.I.D. Sgt.), Harry Littlewood (Caretaker)	Waris Hussein	John Bowen	Thames	N/A
1	"Rachel in Danger"	Della Low (Rachel), Stephen Greif (Juan), Eiko Nakamura (Aiyako), Neville Jason (Peter), George Waring (Police Sergeant), John Joyce (C.I.D. Sgt.), Harry Littlewood (Caretaker)	Waris Hussein	John Bowen	Thames	N/A
1	"Rachel in Danger"	Della Low (Rachel), Stephen Greif (Juan), Eiko Nakamura (Aiyako), Neville Jason (Peter), George Waring (Police Sergeant), John Joyce (C.I.D. Sgt.), Harry Littlewood (Caretaker)	Waris Hussein	John Bowen	Thames	2 March 1978
2	"A Dog's Ransom"	Benjamin Whitrow (Edward Reynolds), Zena Walker (Gina Reynolds), Susie Blake (Marion Dowell), Paul Angelis (Tom Choley), Brian Stirner (Clarence Duhamel), Leon Eagles (Kowajinski), Prentis Hancock (Desk Sergeant), Neville Barber (Chief Superintendent), David Hargreaves (Ken Holbrook), Ray Armstrong (Duty Inspector), Linal Haft (Cookson), Rayner Bourton (Jim), Frank Wylie (Inspector Craig)	Donald McWhinnie	John Bowen	Thames	9 March 1978
2	"A Dog's Ransom"	Benjamin Whitrow (Edward Reynolds), Zena Walker (Gina Reynolds), Susie Blake (Marion Dowell), Paul Angelis (Tom Choley), Brian Stirner (Clarence Duhamel), Leon Eagles (Kowajinski), Prentis Hancock (Desk Sergeant), Neville Barber (Chief Superintendent), David Hargreaves (Ken Holbrook), Ray Armstrong (Duty Inspector), Linal Haft (Cookson), Rayner Bourton (Jim), Frank Wylie (Inspector Craig)	Donald McWhinnie	John Bowen	Thames	N/A
2	"A Dog's Ransom"	Benjamin Whitrow (Edward Reynolds), Zena Walker (Gina Reynolds), Susie Blake (Marion Dowell), Paul Angelis (Tom Choley), Brian Stirner (Clarence Duhamel), Leon Eagles (Kowajinski), Prentis Hancock (Desk Sergeant), Neville Barber (Chief Superintendent), David Hargreaves (Ken Holbrook), Ray Armstrong (Duty Inspector), Linal Haft (Cookson), Rayner Bourton (Jim), Frank Wylie (Inspector Craig)	Donald McWhinnie	John Bowen	Thames	N/A
2	"A Dog's Ransom"	Benjamin Whitrow (Edward Reynolds), Zena Walker (Gina Reynolds), Susie Blake (Marion Dowell), Paul Angelis (Tom Choley), Brian Stirner (Clarence Duhamel), Leon Eagles (Kowajinski), Prentis Hancock (Desk Sergeant), Neville Barber (Chief Superintendent), David Hargreaves (Ken Holbrook), Ray Armstrong (Duty Inspector), Linal Haft (Cookson), Rayner Bourton (Jim), Frank Wylie (Inspector Craig)	Donald McWhinnie	John Bowen	Thames	N/A
2	"A Dog's Ransom"	Benjamin Whitrow (Edward Reynolds), Zena Walker (Gina Reynolds), Susie Blake (Marion Dowell), Paul Angelis (Tom Choley), Brian Stirner (Clarence Duhamel), Leon Eagles (Kowajinski), Prentis Hancock (Desk Sergeant), Neville Barber (Chief Superintendent), David Hargreaves (Ken Holbrook), Ray Armstrong (Duty Inspector), Linal Haft (Cookson), Rayner Bourton (Jim), Frank Wylie (Inspector Craig)	Donald McWhinnie	John Bowen	Thames	N/A
2	"A Dog's Ransom"	Benjamin Whitrow (Edward Reynolds), Zena Walker (Gina Reynolds), Susie Blake (Marion Dowell), Paul Angelis (Tom Choley), Brian Stirner (Clarence Duhamel), Leon Eagles (Kowajinski), Prentis Hancock (Desk Sergeant), Neville Barber (Chief Superintendent), David Hargreaves (Ken Holbrook), Ray Armstrong (Duty Inspector), Linal Haft (Cookson), Rayner Bourton (Jim), Frank Wylie (Inspector Craig)	Donald McWhinnie	John Bowen	Thames	23 March 1978
3	"The Girl Who Walked Quickly"	Denis Lawson (David Cooper), Phyllida Nash (Liz), Clive Merrison (Godolt), Barry Stanton (Swift), John Gregg (Everly), Oliver Smith (1st Helper), Luke Hanson (2nd Helper), Derek Benfield (Mr. Cooper), Colin McCormack (Det. Sgt. Bowen), Martin Fisk (Explosive Officer), Neil Hallett (Commander Lambert), Martyn Whitby (Sniper No. 2)	Brian Farnham	Ray Jenkins	Thames	28 March 1978
3	"The Girl Who Walked Quickly"	Denis Lawson (David Cooper), Phyllida Nash (Liz), Clive Merrison (Godolt), Barry Stanton (Swift), John Gregg (Everly), Oliver Smith (1st Helper), Luke Hanson (2nd Helper), Derek Benfield (Mr. Cooper), Colin McCormack (Det. Sgt. Bowen), Martin Fisk (Explosive Officer), Neil Hallett (Commander Lambert), Martyn Whitby (Sniper No. 2)	Brian Farnham	Ray Jenkins	Thames	N/A
3	"The Girl Who Walked Quickly"	Denis Lawson (David Cooper), Phyllida Nash (Liz), Clive Merrison (Godolt), Barry Stanton (Swift), John Gregg (Everly), Oliver Smith (1st Helper), Luke Hanson (2nd Helper), Derek Benfield (Mr. Cooper), Colin McCormack (Det. Sgt. Bowen), Martin Fisk (Explosive Officer), Neil Hallett (Commander Lambert), Martyn Whitby (Sniper No. 2)	Brian Farnham	Ray Jenkins	Thames	N/A
3	"The Girl Who Walked Quickly"	Denis Lawson (David Cooper), Phyllida Nash (Liz), Clive Merrison (Godolt), Barry Stanton (Swift), John Gregg (Everly), Oliver Smith (1st Helper), Luke Hanson (2nd Helper), Derek Benfield (Mr. Cooper), Colin McCormack (Det. Sgt. Bowen), Martin Fisk (Explosive Officer), Neil Hallett (Commander Lambert), Martyn Whitby (Sniper No. 2)	Brian Farnham	Ray Jenkins	Thames	6 April 1978
4	"Quiet as a Nun"	Maria Aitken (Jemima Shore), Renée Asherson (Mother Ancilla), Brenda Bruce (Sister Elizabeth), David Burke (Tom Amyas), Patsy Kensit (Tessa), Mary Healey (Beatrice O’Dowd), James Appleby (Joe), Susan Engel (Sister Agnes), James Laurenson (Alexander Skarbek), Sylvia Coleridge (Sister Boniface), John Bryans (Sir Charles), Linda Slater (Dodo), Doran Godwin (Sister Lucy)	Moira Armstrong	Julia Jones	Thames	11 April 1978
4	"Quiet as a Nun"	Maria Aitken (Jemima Shore), Renée Asherson (Mother Ancilla), Brenda Bruce (Sister Elizabeth), David Burke (Tom Amyas), Patsy Kensit (Tessa), Mary Healey (Beatrice O’Dowd), James Appleby (Joe), Susan Engel (Sister Agnes), James Laurenson (Alexander Skarbek), Sylvia Coleridge (Sister Boniface), John Bryans (Sir Charles), Linda Slater (Dodo), Doran Godwin (Sister Lucy)	Moira Armstrong	Julia Jones	Thames	N/A
4	"Quiet as a Nun"	Maria Aitken (Jemima Shore), Renée Asherson (Mother Ancilla), Brenda Bruce (Sister Elizabeth), David Burke (Tom Amyas), Patsy Kensit (Tessa), Mary Healey (Beatrice O’Dowd), James Appleby (Joe), Susan Engel (Sister Agnes), James Laurenson (Alexander Skarbek), Sylvia Coleridge (Sister Boniface), John Bryans (Sir Charles), Linda Slater (Dodo), Doran Godwin (Sister Lucy)	Moira Armstrong	Julia Jones	Thames	N/A
4	"Quiet as a Nun"	Maria Aitken (Jemima Shore), Renée Asherson (Mother Ancilla), Brenda Bruce (Sister Elizabeth), David Burke (Tom Amyas), Patsy Kensit (Tessa), Mary Healey (Beatrice O’Dowd), James Appleby (Joe), Susan Engel (Sister Agnes), James Laurenson (Alexander Skarbek), Sylvia Coleridge (Sister Boniface), John Bryans (Sir Charles), Linda Slater (Dodo), Doran Godwin (Sister Lucy)	Moira Armstrong	Julia Jones	Thames	N/A
4	"Quiet as a Nun"	Maria Aitken (Jemima Shore), Renée Asherson (Mother Ancilla), Brenda Bruce (Sister Elizabeth), David Burke (Tom Amyas), Patsy Kensit (Tessa), Mary Healey (Beatrice O’Dowd), James Appleby (Joe), Susan Engel (Sister Agnes), James Laurenson (Alexander Skarbek), Sylvia Coleridge (Sister Boniface), John Bryans (Sir Charles), Linda Slater (Dodo), Doran Godwin (Sister Lucy)	Moira Armstrong	Julia Jones	Thames	N/A
4	"Quiet as a Nun"	Maria Aitken (Jemima Shore), Renée Asherson (Mother Ancilla), Brenda Bruce (Sister Elizabeth), David Burke (Tom Amyas), Patsy Kensit (Tessa), Mary Healey (Beatrice O’Dowd), James Appleby (Joe), Susan Engel (Sister Agnes), James Laurenson (Alexander Skarbek), Sylvia Coleridge (Sister Boniface), John Bryans (Sir Charles), Linda Slater (Dodo), Doran Godwin (Sister Lucy)	Moira Armstrong	Julia Jones	Thames	27 April 1978
5	"The Limbo Connection"	James Bolam (Mark Omney), Rosalind Ayres (Annabella Fraser), Michael Culver (Dr. Walcott Brown), Beatrix Lehmann (Blanche Terraine), Vass Anderson (Soames), Alan Ford (Bill), Christopher Benjamin (Det. Inspector Tarrant), Peter Welch (Mechanic), Aimée Delamain (Mrs. Franklyn), Arthur Blake (Mr. Dyer), Milton Johns (Tim Kennaway), Rosamund Greenwood (Mrs. Woldingham)	Robert Tronson	Philip Mackie	Thames	2 May 1978
5	"The Limbo Connection"	James Bolam (Mark Omney), Rosalind Ayres (Annabella Fraser), Michael Culver (Dr. Walcott Brown), Beatrix Lehmann (Blanche Terraine), Vass Anderson (Soames), Alan Ford (Bill), Christopher Benjamin (Det. Inspector Tarrant), Peter Welch (Mechanic), Aimée Delamain (Mrs. Franklyn), Arthur Blake (Mr. Dyer), Milton Johns (Tim Kennaway), Rosamund Greenwood (Mrs. Woldingham)	Robert Tronson	Philip Mackie	Thames	N/A
5	"The Limbo Connection"	James Bolam (Mark Omney), Rosalind Ayres (Annabella Fraser), Michael Culver (Dr. Walcott Brown), Beatrix Lehmann (Blanche Terraine), Vass Anderson (Soames), Alan Ford (Bill), Christopher Benjamin (Det. Inspector Tarrant), Peter Welch (Mechanic), Aimée Delamain (Mrs. Franklyn), Arthur Blake (Mr. Dyer), Milton Johns (Tim Kennaway), Rosamund Greenwood (Mrs. Woldingham)	Robert Tronson	Philip Mackie	Thames	N/A
5	"The Limbo Connection"	James Bolam (Mark Omney), Rosalind Ayres (Annabella Fraser), Michael Culver (Dr. Walcott Brown), Beatrix Lehmann (Blanche Terraine), Vass Anderson (Soames), Alan Ford (Bill), Christopher Benjamin (Det. Inspector Tarrant), Peter Welch (Mechanic), Aimée Delamain (Mrs. Franklyn), Arthur Blake (Mr. Dyer), Milton Johns (Tim Kennaway), Rosamund Greenwood (Mrs. Woldingham)	Robert Tronson	Philip Mackie	Thames	N/A
5	"The Limbo Connection"	James Bolam (Mark Omney), Rosalind Ayres (Annabella Fraser), Michael Culver (Dr. Walcott Brown), Beatrix Lehmann (Blanche Terraine), Vass Anderson (Soames), Alan Ford (Bill), Christopher Benjamin (Det. Inspector Tarrant), Peter Welch (Mechanic), Aimée Delamain (Mrs. Franklyn), Arthur Blake (Mr. Dyer), Milton Johns (Tim Kennaway), Rosamund Greenwood (Mrs. Woldingham)	Robert Tronson	Philip Mackie	Thames	N/A
5	"The Limbo Connection"	James Bolam (Mark Omney), Rosalind Ayres (Annabella Fraser), Michael Culver (Dr. Walcott Brown), Beatrix Lehmann (Blanche Terraine), Vass Anderson (Soames), Alan Ford (Bill), Christopher Benjamin (Det. Inspector Tarrant), Peter Welch (Mechanic), Aimée Delamain (Mrs. Franklyn), Arthur Blake (Mr. Dyer), Milton Johns (Tim Kennaway), Rosamund Greenwood (Mrs. Woldingham)	Robert Tronson	Philip Mackie	Thames	18 May 1978

=== Series 2 ===
No.	Title	Cast	Directed by	Written by	Production company	Original release date
6	"The Victim"	David Beckett (Frankie Martin), Lorna Yabsley (Sue Craig), Steve Morley (Len Trace), John Shrapnel (Vincent Craig), Paul Jerricho (Harry Turner), Godfrey James (Chief Supt. Lewis), Edward Burnham (Professor Manson), Alan Bennion (Praed), Bernard Kay (Neecham), Dominic Letts (Betting Shop Assistant), Jerold Wells (1st Dosser), Richard McNeff (Chief Prison Officer)	Gareth Davies	Michael Ashe	Thames	8 January 1980
6	"The Victim"	David Beckett (Frankie Martin), Lorna Yabsley (Sue Craig), Steve Morley (Len Trace), John Shrapnel (Vincent Craig), Paul Jerricho (Harry Turner), Godfrey James (Chief Supt. Lewis), Edward Burnham (Professor Manson), Alan Bennion (Praed), Bernard Kay (Neecham), Dominic Letts (Betting Shop Assistant), Jerold Wells (1st Dosser), Richard McNeff (Chief Prison Officer)	Gareth Davies	Michael Ashe	Thames	N/A
6	"The Victim"	David Beckett (Frankie Martin), Lorna Yabsley (Sue Craig), Steve Morley (Len Trace), John Shrapnel (Vincent Craig), Paul Jerricho (Harry Turner), Godfrey James (Chief Supt. Lewis), Edward Burnham (Professor Manson), Alan Bennion (Praed), Bernard Kay (Neecham), Dominic Letts (Betting Shop Assistant), Jerold Wells (1st Dosser), Richard McNeff (Chief Prison Officer)	Gareth Davies	Michael Ashe	Thames	N/A
6	"The Victim"	David Beckett (Frankie Martin), Lorna Yabsley (Sue Craig), Steve Morley (Len Trace), John Shrapnel (Vincent Craig), Paul Jerricho (Harry Turner), Godfrey James (Chief Supt. Lewis), Edward Burnham (Professor Manson), Alan Bennion (Praed), Bernard Kay (Neecham), Dominic Letts (Betting Shop Assistant), Jerold Wells (1st Dosser), Richard McNeff (Chief Prison Officer)	Gareth Davies	Michael Ashe	Thames	N/A
6	"The Victim"	David Beckett (Frankie Martin), Lorna Yabsley (Sue Craig), Steve Morley (Len Trace), John Shrapnel (Vincent Craig), Paul Jerricho (Harry Turner), Godfrey James (Chief Supt. Lewis), Edward Burnham (Professor Manson), Alan Bennion (Praed), Bernard Kay (Neecham), Dominic Letts (Betting Shop Assistant), Jerold Wells (1st Dosser), Richard McNeff (Chief Prison Officer)	Gareth Davies	Michael Ashe	Thames	N/A
6	"The Victim"	David Beckett (Frankie Martin), Lorna Yabsley (Sue Craig), Steve Morley (Len Trace), John Shrapnel (Vincent Craig), Paul Jerricho (Harry Turner), Godfrey James (Chief Supt. Lewis), Edward Burnham (Professor Manson), Alan Bennion (Praed), Bernard Kay (Neecham), Dominic Letts (Betting Shop Assistant), Jerold Wells (1st Dosser), Richard McNeff (Chief Prison Officer)	Gareth Davies	Michael Ashe	Thames	24 January 1980
7	"Dead Man's Kit"	Larry Lamb (CPO Chalkey White), Philip Locke (Cmdr. Lloyd), Maurice Colbourne (Lt. Cmdr. Kobahl), Clive Merrison (Commander Maybury), Paul Kember (Peters), Jamie Foreman (Operator 1), Timothy Block (Operator 2), Richard Kane (Winterman), William Russell (Senior Officer)	Colin Bucksey	Tom Clenaghan	Southern	29 January 1980
7	"Dead Man's Kit"	Larry Lamb (CPO Chalkey White), Philip Locke (Cmdr. Lloyd), Maurice Colbourne (Lt. Cmdr. Kobahl), Clive Merrison (Commander Maybury), Paul Kember (Peters), Jamie Foreman (Operator 1), Timothy Block (Operator 2), Richard Kane (Winterman), William Russell (Senior Officer)	Colin Bucksey	Tom Clenaghan	Southern	N/A
7	"Dead Man's Kit"	Larry Lamb (CPO Chalkey White), Philip Locke (Cmdr. Lloyd), Maurice Colbourne (Lt. Cmdr. Kobahl), Clive Merrison (Commander Maybury), Paul Kember (Peters), Jamie Foreman (Operator 1), Timothy Block (Operator 2), Richard Kane (Winterman), William Russell (Senior Officer)	Colin Bucksey	Tom Clenaghan	Southern	N/A
7	"Dead Man's Kit"	Larry Lamb (CPO Chalkey White), Philip Locke (Cmdr. Lloyd), Maurice Colbourne (Lt. Cmdr. Kobahl), Clive Merrison (Commander Maybury), Paul Kember (Peters), Jamie Foreman (Operator 1), Timothy Block (Operator 2), Richard Kane (Winterman), William Russell (Senior Officer)	Colin Bucksey	Tom Clenaghan	Southern	7 February 1980
8	"Dying Day"	Ian McKellen (Anthony Skipling), Maurice Kaufmann (1st Interrogator), Prentis Hancock (2nd Interrogator), Patrick Malahide (Police Sergeant), Michael Troughton (Police Constable), Peter Childs (Sellars), Cyril Shaps (Mountjoy)	Robert Tronson	John Bowen	Thames	12 February 1980
8	"Dying Day"	Ian McKellen (Anthony Skipling), Maurice Kaufmann (1st Interrogator), Prentis Hancock (2nd Interrogator), Patrick Malahide (Police Sergeant), Michael Troughton (Police Constable), Peter Childs (Sellars), Cyril Shaps (Mountjoy)	Robert Tronson	John Bowen	Thames	N/A
8	"Dying Day"	Ian McKellen (Anthony Skipling), Maurice Kaufmann (1st Interrogator), Prentis Hancock (2nd Interrogator), Patrick Malahide (Police Sergeant), Michael Troughton (Police Constable), Peter Childs (Sellars), Cyril Shaps (Mountjoy)	Robert Tronson	John Bowen	Thames	N/A
8	"Dying Day"	Ian McKellen (Anthony Skipling), Maurice Kaufmann (1st Interrogator), Prentis Hancock (2nd Interrogator), Patrick Malahide (Police Sergeant), Michael Troughton (Police Constable), Peter Childs (Sellars), Cyril Shaps (Mountjoy)	Robert Tronson	John Bowen	Thames	21 February 1980
9	"Fear of God"	Bryan Marshall (Paul Marriot), Alun Armstrong (Trahearne), Peter Cellier (Maitland), Michael Sheard (Colonel Morgan), Garrick Hagon (Walters), Roger Brierley (Vic), David Graham (Vicar), David Healy (Anvil), Laurence Harrington (Sub-Editor), Lionel Sansby (Ambulance Man), Susan Sheridan (Voice of Rosamund)	Robert Tronson	Troy Kennedy Martin	Thames	26 February 1980
9	"Fear of God"	Bryan Marshall (Paul Marriot), Alun Armstrong (Trahearne), Peter Cellier (Maitland), Michael Sheard (Colonel Morgan), Garrick Hagon (Walters), Roger Brierley (Vic), David Graham (Vicar), David Healy (Anvil), Laurence Harrington (Sub-Editor), Lionel Sansby (Ambulance Man), Susan Sheridan (Voice of Rosamund)	Robert Tronson	Troy Kennedy Martin	Thames	N/A
9	"Fear of God"	Bryan Marshall (Paul Marriot), Alun Armstrong (Trahearne), Peter Cellier (Maitland), Michael Sheard (Colonel Morgan), Garrick Hagon (Walters), Roger Brierley (Vic), David Graham (Vicar), David Healy (Anvil), Laurence Harrington (Sub-Editor), Lionel Sansby (Ambulance Man), Susan Sheridan (Voice of Rosamund)	Robert Tronson	Troy Kennedy Martin	Thames	N/A
9	"Fear of God"	Bryan Marshall (Paul Marriot), Alun Armstrong (Trahearne), Peter Cellier (Maitland), Michael Sheard (Colonel Morgan), Garrick Hagon (Walters), Roger Brierley (Vic), David Graham (Vicar), David Healy (Anvil), Laurence Harrington (Sub-Editor), Lionel Sansby (Ambulance Man), Susan Sheridan (Voice of Rosamund)	Robert Tronson	Troy Kennedy Martin	Thames	6 March 1980
10	"High Tide"	Ian McShane (Peter Curtis), Wendy Morgan (Celia), Terence Rigby (Matthews), John Bird (Cyril), Malcolm Terris (Maxwell)	Colin Bucksey	Andrew Brown	Southern	11 March 1980
10	"High Tide"	Ian McShane (Peter Curtis), Wendy Morgan (Celia), Terence Rigby (Matthews), John Bird (Cyril), Malcolm Terris (Maxwell)	Colin Bucksey	Andrew Brown	Southern	N/A
10	"High Tide"	Ian McShane (Peter Curtis), Wendy Morgan (Celia), Terence Rigby (Matthews), John Bird (Cyril), Malcolm Terris (Maxwell)	Colin Bucksey	Andrew Brown	Southern	N/A
10	"High Tide"	Ian McShane (Peter Curtis), Wendy Morgan (Celia), Terence Rigby (Matthews), John Bird (Cyril), Malcolm Terris (Maxwell)	Colin Bucksey	Andrew Brown	Southern	20 March 1980
11	"The Circe Complex"	Beth Morris (Val Foreman), Trevor Martin (Tom Foreman), Alan David (Ollie Milton), Gareth Forwood (Dr. Crampton), James Hazeldine (Dave), Geoffrey Colville (Prison Governor), Eric Francis (Mr. Evans), Marc Boyle (Policeman), Derek Ware (O’Brady), Neil Daglish (Det. Sgt. Rees), Victor Winding (Det. Insp. Sayers)	Robert D. Cardona	David Hopkins	Thames	25 March 1980
11	"The Circe Complex"	Beth Morris (Val Foreman), Trevor Martin (Tom Foreman), Alan David (Ollie Milton), Gareth Forwood (Dr. Crampton), James Hazeldine (Dave), Geoffrey Colville (Prison Governor), Eric Francis (Mr. Evans), Marc Boyle (Policeman), Derek Ware (O’Brady), Neil Daglish (Det. Sgt. Rees), Victor Winding (Det. Insp. Sayers)	Robert D. Cardona	David Hopkins	Thames	N/A
11	"The Circe Complex"	Beth Morris (Val Foreman), Trevor Martin (Tom Foreman), Alan David (Ollie Milton), Gareth Forwood (Dr. Crampton), James Hazeldine (Dave), Geoffrey Colville (Prison Governor), Eric Francis (Mr. Evans), Marc Boyle (Policeman), Derek Ware (O’Brady), Neil Daglish (Det. Sgt. Rees), Victor Winding (Det. Insp. Sayers)	Robert D. Cardona	David Hopkins	Thames	N/A
11	"The Circe Complex"	Beth Morris (Val Foreman), Trevor Martin (Tom Foreman), Alan David (Ollie Milton), Gareth Forwood (Dr. Crampton), James Hazeldine (Dave), Geoffrey Colville (Prison Governor), Eric Francis (Mr. Evans), Marc Boyle (Policeman), Derek Ware (O’Brady), Neil Daglish (Det. Sgt. Rees), Victor Winding (Det. Insp. Sayers)	Robert D. Cardona	David Hopkins	Thames	N/A
11	"The Circe Complex"	Beth Morris (Val Foreman), Trevor Martin (Tom Foreman), Alan David (Ollie Milton), Gareth Forwood (Dr. Crampton), James Hazeldine (Dave), Geoffrey Colville (Prison Governor), Eric Francis (Mr. Evans), Marc Boyle (Policeman), Derek Ware (O’Brady), Neil Daglish (Det. Sgt. Rees), Victor Winding (Det. Insp. Sayers)	Robert D. Cardona	David Hopkins	Thames	N/A
11	"The Circe Complex"	Beth Morris (Val Foreman), Trevor Martin (Tom Foreman), Alan David (Ollie Milton), Gareth Forwood (Dr. Crampton), James Hazeldine (Dave), Geoffrey Colville (Prison Governor), Eric Francis (Mr. Evans), Marc Boyle (Policeman), Derek Ware (O’Brady), Neil Daglish (Det. Sgt. Rees), Victor Winding (Det. Insp. Sayers)	Robert D. Cardona	David Hopkins	Thames	10 April 1980
12	"The Chelsea Murders"	Michael Feast (Steve), Guy Gregory (Artie), Antony Carrick (Summers), Chris Gannon (Publican), Lucy Griffiths (Mrs. Bulstrode), Doug Sheldon (Otto), David Yip (Denny), Richard Hampton (Editor), Ian Liston (Policeman), Ishaq Bux (Arab Servant)	Derek Bennett	Jonathan Hales	Thames	30 December 1981
"The Chelsea Murders" was originally made as a 6-episode story for Armchair Thriller, but was unscreened in this form. The story was eventually broadcast over 20 months later than originally intended, but as a cut down feature-length (104 mins.) standalone programme, and not under the Armchair Thriller umbrella title.

== Home release ==
The ten Thames-produced serials were released by Network in 2008, both as separate stories and as a box-set, with the untransmitted six-part version of "The Chelsea Murders" also included. The Southern Television-produced "Dead Man's Kit" and "High Tide" were released separately, in 2009 and 2010 respectively, by Simply Home Entertainment.
