= Donal Donnelly =

Irish actor (1931–2010)

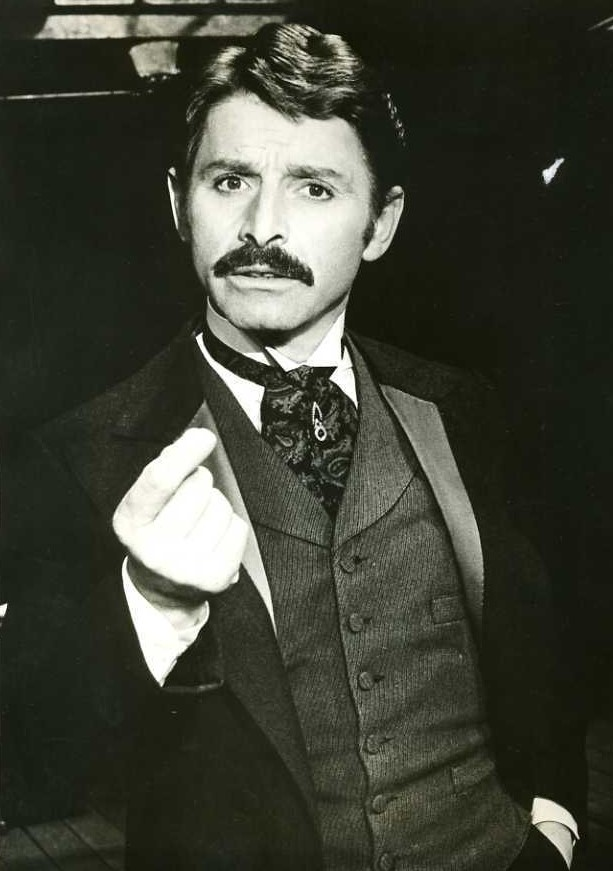
- Donnelly in 1980
- Born: 6 July 1931; Bradford, West Riding of Yorkshire, England, United Kingdom
- Died: 4 January 2010 (aged 78); Chicago, Illinois, United States
- Occupation: Actor
- Years active: 1957–1999
- Spouse: Patricia "Patsy" Porter

Donal Donnelly (6 July 1931 – 4 January 2010) was an Irish theatre and film actor. Perhaps best known for his work in the plays of Brian Friel, he had a long and varied career in film, on television and in the theatre. He lived in Ireland, the UK and the US at various times, and his travels led him to describe himself as "an itinerant Irish actor".

== Early life ==
Donal Donnelly was born to Irish parents in Bradford, Yorkshire, England. His father James was a doctor from County Tyrone, and his mother Nora O'Connor was a teacher from County Kerry.

He was raised in Dublin where he attended school at Synge Street Christian Brothers School in Dublin where he acted in school plays with Milo O'Shea, Eamonn Andrews, Jack MacGowran, Bernard Frawley (Seattle Repertory Co.) and Jimmy Fitzsimons (brother of Maureen O'Hara), under the direction of elocution teacher, Ena Burke.

== Acting career ==
=== Stage ===
Donnelly got his start in an amateur group calling itself the Globe theatre Players. It was organised and run by Jim Fitzgerald and Monica Brophy. He then later toured with Anew McMaster's Irish repertory company before moving to England where he starred with Rita Tushingham in the film The Knack ...and How to Get It.

His breakthrough role came when he was cast as Gar Private in the world premiere of Brian Friel's Philadelphia, Here I Come! directed by Hilton Edwards for the Gate Theatre at the Dublin Theatre Festival in 1964. The production subsequently transferred to Broadway where it played for over 300 performances and established Donnelly and Patrick Bedford – who played his alter-ego Gar Public – as formidable new talents to be reckoned with. They were jointly nominated for the Tony Award for Best Performance by a Leading Actor in a Play in 1966.

Donnelly returned to Broadway a number of times, replacing Albert Finney in A Day in the Death of Joe Egg in 1968, playing Milo Tindle in Anthony Shaffer's Sleuth and appearing as Frederick Treves opposite David Bowie as The Elephant Man. He also renewed his relationship with Brian Friel, appearing in the world premieres of Volunteers at the Abbey Theatre in 1975 and Faith Healer with James Mason (Longacre Theatre, NYC) in 1979 as well as the Broadway premieres of Dancing at Lughnasa in 1991 and Translations in 1995.

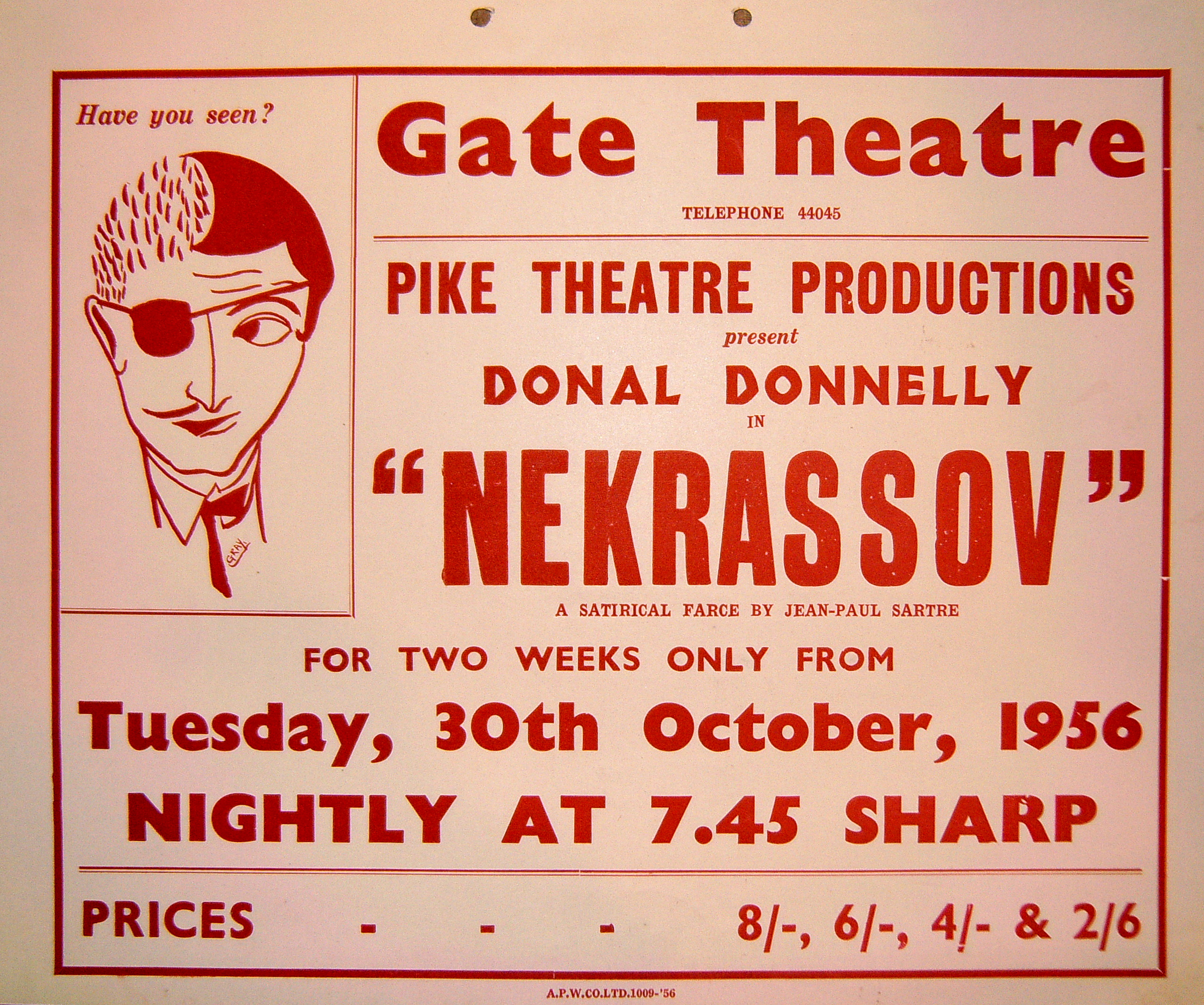
Poster for his double role in Nekrassov by Jean-Paul Sartre. Gate Theatre, Dublin. 1956.

For many years, he toured a one-man performance of the writings of George Bernard Shaw, adapted and directed by Michael Voysey and entitled My Astonishing Self.

=== Film and TV ===
His film roles included Archbishop Gilday in The Godfather Part III and he gained particular acclaim for his performance as Freddy Malins in John Huston's final work, The Dead, based on the short story by James Joyce. Coppola had wanted Donnelly for the role of Og in his 1968 film version of Finian's Rainbow - Tommy Steele eventually filling the role.

On television, he played the lead role of Matthew Browne in the 1970s ITV sitcom Yes Honestly, opposite Liza Goddard. But from the late 1950s onwards, he often appeared in such British TV programs as The Avengers, Z Cars and The Wednesday Play.

== Other work ==
He was an acclaimed audiobook reader whose catalogue includes Pinocchio, Peter Pan, Voltaire's Philosophical Dictionary, and several audio versions of the works of James Joyce.

In 1968, he recorded an album of Irish songs Take the Name of Donnelly, which was arranged, produced and conducted by Tony Meehan formerly of the Shadows.

== Death ==
He died in Chicago, Illinois, on 4 January 2010 from cancer, aged 78, and is survived by his wife, Patricia 'Patsy' Porter – a former dancer he met working on Finian's Rainbow, and two sons, Jonathan and Damian. His daughter Maryanne predeceased him.

== Filmography ==
=== Film ===
Year	Title	Role	Notes
1957	The Rising of the Moon	Prisoner Sean Curran "Jimmy Walsh"	
1958	Gideon's Day	Feeney	
1959	Shake Hands with the Devil	Willie Lafferty	
1959	I'm All Right Jack	Perce Carter	
1963	The Informers	Tommy the Trotter	Uncredited
1965	Young Cassidy	1st Hearseman	
1965	The Knack ...and How to Get It	Tom	
1965	Up Jumped a Swagman	Bockeye	
1970	The Mind of Mr. Soames	Joe Allan	
1970	Waterloo	O'Connor	
1987	The Dead	Freddy Malins	
1989	Twister	Doctor	
1990	The Godfather Part III	Archbishop Gilday	
1994	Mesmer	Doctor	
1994	Squanto: A Warrior's Tale	Brother Paul	
1994	Words Upon the Window Pane	Cornelius Patterson	
1995	Korea	John Doyle	
1998	This Is My Father	John Maney	
1998	Love and Rage	Sweeney	

=== Television ===
Year	Title	Episode(s)	Role	Network	Archive status
1957	The New Adventures of Charlie Chan	Episode 10: The Rajput Ruby	Cab driver (uncredited)	ITV (ITC)	Exists
1958	Play of the Week	Series 3, Episode 28: The Iron Harp	Scanlon	ITV (Rediffusion)	Missing
1958	Play of the Week	Series 4, Episode 13: The Playboy of the Western World	Christy Mahon	ITV (Granada)	Missing
1958	Television Playwright	Episode 10: This Day in Fear	A young detective	BBC Television Service	Exists
1958	Sunday-Night Theatre	Series 9, Episode 30: Home Is the Hero	Willie O'Reilly	BBC Television Service	Missing
1958	Television Playhouse	Series 4, Episode 2: Rest in Violence	Conor Keegan	ITV (Rediffusion)	Missing
1959	Sunday-Night Theatre	Series 10, Episode 5: The Exiles #2: The Long Summer	Mick Dooley	BBC Television Service	Missing
1959	Sunday-Night Theatre	Series 10, Episode 18: Mooney's Wreck	Patsy	BBC Television Service	Missing
1960	International Detective	Episode 5: The Winthrop Case	Fallon	ITV	Exists
1961	Play of the Week	Series 6, Episode 24: The Plough and the Stars	Willie	ITV (Granada)	Missing
1961	Play of the Week	Series 6, Episode 52: Over the Bridge	Peter O'Boyle	ITV (Granada)	Exists
1961	Play of the Week	Series 7, Episode 8: Serjeant Musgrave's Dance	Pte. Sparky	ITV (Granada)	Exists
1962	No Hiding Place	Series 4, Episode 7: Convicts Wife	Danny Nolan	ITV (Rediffusion)	Missing
1962	Play of the Week	Series 8, Episode 6: A Lily in Little India	Alvin Hanker	ITV (ATV)	Exists
1962	The Avengers	Series 2, Episode 14: Dead on Course	Vincent O'Brien	ITV (ABC)	Exists
1963	Z-Cars	Series 2, Episode 23: The Main Chance	Manny Price	BBC Television	Missing
1963	BBC Sunday-Night Play	Series 4, Episode 33: The Fly Sham	George	BBC Television	Missing
1963	The Sentimental Agent	Episode 5: May the Saints Preserve Us	Larry	ITV (ATV)	Exists
1964	Espionage	Episode 17: The Frantick Rebel	Footman	ITV (ATV)	Exists
1964	Festival	Episodes 21: The Old Lady Says No!	Younger man	BBC One	Missing
1964	Festival	Episode 26: John Bull's Other Island	Tim Haffigan	BBC One	Exists
1964	First Night	Episode 32: Captain Rubian	Rica	BBC One	Missing
1965	A Little Big Business	Series 2, Episode 6: Funny Things - People	Shop assistant	ITV (Granada)	Exists
1965	No Hiding Place	Series 7, Episode 14: Smokey	Jerry Dempsey	ITV (Rediffusion)	Exists
1965	Play of the Week	Series 11, Episode 3: The Winds of Green Monday	Seaman Tyrrell	ITV (Rediffusion)	Missing
1965	Thirty-Minute Theatre	Series 1, Episode 7: Application Form	The applicant	BBC Two	Missing
1965	Pardon the Expression	Episode: Xmas Special (filmed; unbroadcast)	Patrick O'Gorman	ITV (Granada)	Exists
1966	The Wednesday Play	Series 4, Episode 19: The Retreat	Rory	BBC One	Exists
1967	NET Playhouse	Series 2, Episode 12: Dublin 1	The lecturer	NET	Unknown
1968	The Wednesday Play	Series 7, Episode 17: The Drummer and the Bloke	Alf	BBC One	Missing
1968	Thirty-Minute Theatre	Series 3, Episode 21: Eveline	Frank	BBC Two	Exists
1968	ITV Playhouse	Episode: Premiere: Foxhole in Bayswater	ITV (Thames)	Marlon	Missing
1969	Out of the Unknown	Series 3, Episode 13: Get Off My Cloud	Pete	BBC Two	Missing
1969	The Government Inspector	TV Movie	Government Inspector	RTÉ	Unknown
1969	Department S	Episode 14: Les Fleurs du Mal	Stacey	ITV (ITC)	All programmes exist from this point
1970	Z-Cars	Series 6, Episodes 331 & 332: A Couple Of Comic Turns Pts. 1 & 2	Bernard Spencer	BBC One	All programmes exist from this point
1973	Orson Welles' Great Mysteries	Episode 15: The Inspiration of Mr. Budd	Mr. Budd	ITV (Anglia)	All programmes exist from this point
1974	ITV Sunday Night Theatre	Series 6, Episode 7: Geography of a Horse Dreamer	Cody	ITV (Granada)	All programmes exist from this point
1975	Benjamin Franklin	Episode 4: The Statesman	James Wilson	CBS	All programmes exist from this point
1975	From Sea to Shining Sea	Episode: The Unwanted	Father O'Reilly	Syndicated	All programmes exist from this point
1976	Yes, Honestly	Series 1, 13 episodes	Matthew Browne	ITV (LWT)	All programmes exist from this point
1977	The Venetian Twins	TV Movie	The twins	BBC Two	All programmes exist from this point
1977	Yes, Honestly	Series 2, 13 episodes	Matthew Browne	ITV (LWT)	All programmes exist from this point
1982	ITV Playhouse	Series 14, Episode 10: The Glory Hole	Jokey Nelson	ITV (Thames)	All programmes exist from this point
1985	Another World	Episodes 4651 & 4652	Vincent LaGrange	NBC	All programmes exist from this point
1986	Spenser: For Hire	Series 2, Episode 8: One if by Land, Two if by Sea	Mr. Martin	ABC	All programmes exist from this point
1991	Law & Order	Series 1, Episode 20: The Troubles	Daniel Mallahan	NBC	All programmes exist from this point
1999	DDU: District Detective Unit	Episodes: Unforgiven Pts. 1 & 2	Fr. Brennan	RTÉ	All programmes exist from this point
