= Patricia Hodge =

English actress (born 1946)

Patricia Hodge OBE
- Born: Patricia Ann Hodge; 29 September 1946 (age 80); Cleethorpes, Lincolnshire, England
- Education: London Academy of Music and Dramatic Art
- Occupation: Actress
- Years active: 1971–present
- Spouse: Peter Douglas Owen (m. 1976; died 2016)
- Children: 2

Patricia Hodge (born 29 September 1946) is an English actress. She is known on-screen for playing Phyllida Erskine-Brown in Rumpole of the Bailey (1978–1992), Jemima Shore in Jemima Shore Investigates (1983), Penny in Miranda (2009–2015) and Mrs Pumphrey in All Creatures Great and Small (2021–present).

Hodge made her West End debut in 1972, and the next year, starred in the West End production of Pippin directed by Bob Fosse. Hodge has received two nominations for the Olivier Award for Best Actress in a Musical, and in 2000, she won the Olivier Award for Best Supporting Actress for her role in the play Money.

Hodges' other screen credits include the 1983 film Betrayal, the 1986 TV adaptation of The Life and Loves of a She-Devil, and the TV film Hotel du Lac (1986). For her role in Hotel du Lac, Hodge received a nomination for the BAFTA TV Award for Best Actress.

== Early life ==
Hodge was born in Cleethorpes, Lincolnshire, daughter of Eric Hodge and Marion, née Phillips. Eric Hodge was from Birkdale, Southport, and served in the RAF for ten years, becoming a flight lieutenant. The Hodges were the managers of the Royal Hotel in Grimsby, and later ran the Wortley Hotel in Scunthorpe, then the Broadway Hotel in Letchworth.

Hodge attended Wintringham Girls' Grammar School in Park Avenue in Grimsby and then St Helen's School, Northwood, Middlesex, before attending Maria Grey College in Twickenham (later part of Brunel University London) to train as a teacher. She taught English and drama at Russell County Primary School in Chorleywood, Hertfordshire, while also applying to the London Academy of Music and Dramatic Art. She started at LAMDA when she was 22 and was awarded the Eveline Evans Award for Best Actress on graduation.

== Career ==
Hodge made her professional stage debut in the Howard Barker play No-One Was Saved at the Traverse Theatre, Edinburgh, in 1971. She made her West End debut in Rookery Nook in 1972 and worked with Bob Fosse in 1973 on Pippin. However, when applying for television work, she found she had become classed as a theatre actress. Having made the breakthrough in the role of Phyllida (née Trant) Erskine-Brown in Rumpole of the Bailey, she found when trying to make the occasional return to theatre work that she had been classed as a television actress.

She has appeared in roles in The Naked Civil Servant opposite John Hurt, shortly after she featured in the BBC 2 1975 Christmas production Great Big Groovy Horse, a rock opera based on the story of the Trojan Horse starring Julie Covington, Bernard Cribbins and Paul Jones. It was repeated on BBC1 in 1977. She featured as Myra Arundel in the 1984 BBC version of Noël Coward's Hay Fever, as Margaret Thatcher in The Falklands Play, and in 2007 as Betty, the wife of tycoon Robert Maxwell, in the BBC TV drama Maxwell opposite David Suchet. She took the female lead in the 1983 film, Betrayal (based on Harold Pinter's play Betrayal), a roman à clef derived from the playwright's affair with broadcaster Joan Bakewell.

She was nominated for a BAFTA for her role in a television adaptation of Anita Brookner's Hotel du Lac in 1987, and was awarded the Laurence Olivier Theatre Award in 2000 for Best Supporting Actress for her performance in the production of Money at the National Theatre.

She bought the rights of the book Portrait of a Marriage and is credited with developing a TV series of the same name in association with the BBC in 1990 adapted by writer Penelope Mortimer.

She co-starred with Dame Judi Dench in the 1995 London revival of Stephen Sondheim's A Little Night Music, at the National Theatre, as Countess Charlotte Malcolm. In 1998, she appeared on Lesley Garrett Tonight singing 'Three little maids from school', with Lily Savage.In 2003, Hodge featured in His Dark Materials, one of Nicholas Hytner's early productions as its Artistic Director, her third role on the Olivier Theatre stage.

Hodge is an Honorary Graduate (DLitt) of Brunel University and one of the founder members of the Brunel Club. From 2009 to 2015, she played a comedy role in the BBC sitcom Miranda, as the mother of the eponymous main character. Hodge reprised the role alongside the rest of the cast for the 2017 Royal Variety Performance. In 2012 she toured in Christopher Luscombe's revival of Dandy Dick, starring alongside Nicholas Le Prevost. She is Joint President of Grimsby's Caxton Theatre and a Trustee of LAMDA, her alma mater.

In 2008, she guest-starred in an episode of Hustle within the 4th series, playing the character of Veronica Powell. After the BBC commissioned the show for a 5th series in February 2008, it was planned Hodge would make an additional appearance; however, due to on-set filming issues, the episode her character would have appeared in was never finished, and subsequently never aired. The release of the 5th series was delayed as a result.

In 2018, Hodge played Ursula, the mother of Liberal MP and party leader Jeremy Thorpe (played by Hugh Grant) in BBC Television's A Very English Scandal.

In April 2021, it was announced that Hodge would play the role of Mrs. Pumphrey in the television series All Creatures Great and Small, taking over from Diana Rigg, who had died the previous year.

Delayed for a year from autumn 2020 due to the Covid-19 pandemic, Hodge was invited by Nigel Havers to star opposite him in Noël Coward's Private Lives, the inaugural production of the Nigel Havers Theatre Company, directed by one of her previous collaborators Christopher Luscombe.

Hodge was appointed an Officer of the Order of the British Empire (OBE) in the 2017 Birthday Honours for services to drama.

In December 2025 Hodge played Mrs Malaprop in The Rivals, to celebrate the 250th anniversary of the Richard Brinsley Sheridan play, at the Orange Tree Theatre in Richmond, London.

== Filmography ==
=== Film ===
Year	Title	Role	Notes
1977	The Disappearance	Young Wife	
1978	Rosie Dixon - Night Nurse	Sister Belter	
1978	Jacob Two-Two Meets the Hooded Fang	Courtroom Choir Singer	
1980	The Elephant Man	Screaming Mum	
1981	Charlotte	Teacher	
1981	Riding High	Miss Hemmings	
1983	Betrayal	Emma	
1986	Hud	Edward's Wife	
1988	Sunset	Christina Alperin	
1988	Just Ask for Diamond	Betty Charlady/Brenda von Falkenberg	
1996	The Leading Man	Delevene	
1998	Jilting Joe	Gwennie	
1998	Prague Duet	Olivia Walton	
2002	Before You Go	Violet Mary Heaney	
2018	Surviving Christmas with the Relatives	Aunt Peggy	
2021	The Laureate	Amy Graves	
2024	Arthur's Whisky	Joan	

=== Television ===
Year	Title	Role	Notes
1973	Menace	Charmian	Episode: "Valentine"
1975	The Girls of Slender Means	Anne Baberton	All 3 episodes
1975	Quiller	Kate	Episode: "Night of the Father"
1975	The Naked Civil Servant	Ballet Teacher	TV film
1975	Great Big Groovy Horse		TV film
1976	Softly, Softly: Task Force	Chris Stroud	Episode: "A Shot in the Dark"
1977	Jackanory Playhouse	Tisiphone	Episode: "The Apple of Discord"
1978	Target	Laura Bentley	Episode: "Figures of Importance"
1978	Disraeli	Rosina Bulwer Lytton	2 episodes
1978	Edward & Mrs. Simpson	Lady Diana Cooper	3 episodes
1978	The One and Only Phyllis Dixey	Maisie	TV film
1978–1992	Rumpole of the Bailey	Phyllida Erskine-Brown	17 episodes
1979	Lieutenant Kije	Princess Sasha	Voice; TV film
1980	The Professionals	Ann Holly	Episode: "Involvement"
1980–1981	The Other 'Arf	Sybilla Howarth	6 episodes
1980–1982	Holding the Fort	Penny Milburn	All 20 episodes
1981	Winston Churchill: The Wilderness Years	Lady Londonderry	Episode: "His Own Funeral"
1981–1982	Nanny	Dorinda Sackville	4 episodes
1983	Jemima Shore Investigates	Jemima Shore	All 12 episodes
1984	Hay Fever	Myra Arundel	TV film
1985	Time for Murder	Margaret Tutting	Episode: "Dust to Dust"
1985	Behind Enemy Lines	Elizabeth Beaumont	TV film
1986	The Life and Loves of a She-Devil	Mary Fisher	All 4 episodes
1986	The Return of Sherlock Holmes	Lady Hilda Trelawney Hope	Episode: "The Second Stain"
1986	Robin of Sherwood	Queen Hadwisa	Episode: "The Pretender"
1986	Screen Two	Monica	Episode: "Hotel du Lac"
1987	The Death of the Heart	Anna Quayne	TV film
1987	First Sight	Estelle	Episode: "Exclusive Yarns"
1988	Thieves in the Night	Lady Joyce	TV film
1989	Inspector Morse	Lady Hanbury	Episode: "Ghost in the Machine"
1989	The Shell Seekers	Olivia	TV film
1989	Victoria Wood	Moira	Episode: "Staying In"
1989	Spymaker: The Secret Life of Ian Fleming	Lady Evelyn	TV film
1990	Heat of the Day	Stella	TV film
1991	Rich Tea and Sympathy	Julia Merrygrove	All 6 episodes
1992	The Cloning of Joanna May	Joanna May	Both 2 episodes
1996	The Legacy of Reginald Perrin	Geraldine Hackstraw	All 7 episodes
1996	The Moonstone	Lady Julia Verinder	TV film
1999	The People's Passion	Procula Pilate	TV film
2002	The Falklands Play	Rt Hon. Margaret Thatcher MP	TV film
2002	Waking the Dead	Lady Alice Beatty	Episode: "Special Relationship"
2003	Sweet Medicine	Georgina Sweet	All 10 episodes
2006	Agatha Christie's Marple	Mrs Evadne Willett	Episode: "The Sittaford Mystery"
2007	Hustle	Veronica Powell	Episode: "Getting Even"
2007	Maxwell	Betty Maxwell	TV film
2009–2015	Miranda	Penny	All 20 episodes
2012	In Love With...	Clare	Episode: "In Love with Coward"
2013	Agatha Christie's Poirot	Madame Olivier	Episode: "The Big Four"
2015	Downton Abbey	Mrs Miranda Pelham	Episode: "The Finale"
2018	A Very English Scandal	Ursula Thorpe	3 episodes
2019	Four Weddings and a Funeral	Mrs Thorpe-Blood	Episode: "The Winner Takes It All"
2020	Roadkill	Lady Roche	2 episodes
2021–	All Creatures Great and Small	Mrs Pumphrey	Series 2 onwards
2022	Murder in Provence	Florence Bonnet	Recurring
2025	Death Valley	Helena Hart	Episode 5
2026	Marble Hall Murders	Miriam Crace / Lady Margaret Chalfont	5 episodes

=== Stage ===
- No-One Was Saved, 1971
- Rookery Nook, 1972
- Popkiss, 1972
- Two Gentlemen of Verona, 1973
- Pippin, 1973
- Hair, 1974
- The Beggar's Opera, 1975
- Pal Joey, 1976
- Look Back in Anger, 1976
- Then and Now, 1979 (Emma Baildon)
- The Mitford Girls, 1981 (Nancy and Murv)
- As You Like It, 1983 (Rosalind)
- Benefactors, 1984 premiere production (Jane Kitzinger)
- Lady in the Dark, 1988 (Liza Elliott)
- Noël and Gertie, 1989–90 (Gertie)
- Shades, 1992
- Separate Tables, 1993 (Miss Railton-Bell)
- The Prime of Miss Jean Brodie, 1994–95 (Jean Brodie)
- A Little Night Music, 1995–96 (Countess Charlotte Malcolm)
- Money, 1999 (Lady Franklin)
- Summerfolk, 1999–2000 (Maria Lvovna)
- Noises Off, 2000–01 (Dotty Otley)
- His Dark Materials, 2003–04 (Mrs Coulter)
- Dream Me a Winter, 2006 (part of the Old Vic's '24 Hour Plays')
- Boeing Boeing, 2007
- The Country Wife, 2007–08 (Lady Fidget)
- The Clean House, 2008
- Calendar Girls, 2008–09 (Annie)
- The Breath of Life, 2011
- Dandy Dick, 2012 (Georgiana)
- Relative Values, 2013–14
- Travels with My Aunt, 2016
- Copenhagen, 2018
- A Day in the Death of Joe Egg, 2019
- Private Lives, 2021–22
- Watch on the Rhine, 2022–23
- Private Lives, 2023 (Amanda)
- Pippin, 2024 (50th anniversary concert)
- The Rivals, 2025–26 (Mrs Malaprop)

== Awards and nominations ==
Year	Award	Work	Result
1981	Olivier Award for Best Actress in a Musical	The Mitford Girls	Nominated
1987	BAFTA TV Award for Best Actress	Hotel du Lac	Nominated
1990	Olivier Award for Best Actress in a Musical	Noel and Gertie	Nominated
2000	Olivier Award for Best Supporting Actress	Money	Won
