= The Shell Seekers (2006 film) =

- Based on: The Shell Seekers by Rosamunde Pilcher
- Written by: Brian Finch
- Directed by: Piers Haggard
- Starring: Vanessa Redgrave; Maximilian Schell; Sebastian Koch; Victoria Hamilton
- Music by: Richard Blackford
- Countries of origin: Germany; United Kingdom
- Original languages: German; English

Production
- Producers: David Cunliffe; Alexander Ollig; Rikolt von Gagern; Verena von Heeremann
- Cinematography: Tony Imi
- Editor: David Martin
- Running time: 183 min

Original release
- Network: ZDF
- Release: 25 December – 26 December 2006

The Shell Seekers (German: Die Muschelsucher) is a 2006 mini-series starring Academy Award-winners, Vanessa Redgrave and Maximilian Schell. The British-German co-production was directed by Piers Haggard. It is an adaptation of Rosamunde Pilcher's 1987 novel of the same name and premiered on Germany's ZDF on 25 December 2006. It was screened in the United States on the Hallmark Channel on 3 May 2008.

== Plot ==
Set in the 1980s, Penelope (Redgrave) is seen to be recovering from a heart attack. Through a series of flashbacks, we learn she is the daughter of Lawrence (Schell), an acclaimed painter. Her children attempt to convince her to sell her father's paintings and ease their financial burdens. As Penelope continues to recover she reflects on her life, as a disillusioned wife and briefly enthralled lover. She embarks on a trip to the Mediterranean where she encounters Antonia (Stumph), whom she meets up with later on in the book, who becomes a woman in the grip of a passionate romance, something Penelope realises she briefly enjoyed.

== Cast ==
- Vanessa Redgrave as Penelope Keeling
- Maximilian Schell as Lawrence Sterne
- Sebastian Koch as Cosmo König
- Victoria Hamilton as Nancy Chamberlaine
- Stephanie Stumph as Antonia König
- Victoria Smurfit as Olivia Keeling
- Charles Edwards as Noel Keeling
- Alastair Mackenzie as Richard
- Prunella Scales as Dolly Keeling
- Richard Hope as George Chamberlaine
- Toby Fisher as Ambrose Keeling
- Cherith Mellor as Mrs. Plackett
- Hugh Sachs as Roy Brookner

== Production ==
The mini-series was shot in 2005 in a range of locations such as Cornwall, London and Wales.

== Reception ==
Variety made comparisons between the series and Redgrave's 2007 film, Atonement. The magazine praised her casting, as Redgrave "delivers a fine, flinty performance". It concluded that "the melancholy ending caps it with a satisfying exclamation point."

Redgrave was awarded Best Actress in a Television Film at the Shanghai International TV Festival.
