= Charlotte Bingham =

English novelist (1942–2025)

The Honourable Charlotte Bingham
- Born: Charlotte Mary Thérèse Bingham; 29 June 1942; Haywards Heath, Sussex, England
- Died: 16 November 2025 (aged 83)
- Occupation: Novelist
- Spouse: Terence Brady (m. 1964; died 2016)
- Children: Candida Brady; Matthew Brady
- Parents: John Bingham, 7th Baron Clanmorris; Madeleine Bingham
- Writing career
- Language: English
- Period: 1963–2025
- Genre: Romance
- Notable awards: RoNA Award
- Website: charlottebingham.com

Charlotte Bingham (29 June 1942 – 16 November 2025) was an English novelist who wrote over 30 mainly historical romance novels and also wrote for many television programmes including Upstairs, Downstairs; Play for Today; and Robin's Nest. In her television work, she often worked with her husband, Terence Brady.

== Life and career ==
=== Early life ===
Charlotte Mary Thérèse Bingham was born on 29 June 1942 in Haywards Heath, Sussex. Her father, John Bingham, 7th Baron Clanmorris, wrote detective stories and was a secret member of MI5. Her mother, Madeleine Bingham, née Madeleine Mary Ebel, was a playwright and biographer. Bingham first attended a school in London, but from the age of seven to 16, she went to the Priory School in Haywards Heath. After she left school, Bingham went to stay in Paris with some French aristocrats with the intention of learning French. She had been writing since she was ten years old, and her first piece of work was a thriller called Death's Ticket. Bingham wrote her humorous autobiography, called Coronet Among the Weeds, mostly about her life as a debutante, searching for a "real man", when she was 19, and not long before her twentieth birthday a literary agent discovered her celebrating at the Ritz. He was a friend of her parents and he took off the finished manuscript of her autobiography. In 1963, this was published by Heinemann and was a best seller. It has been compared to How to Stay Married by Jilly Cooper for its portrayal of London.

=== Television work ===
In 1966, her first novel, Lucinda, was published. This was later adapted into a TV screenplay. Coronet Among the Grass, her second autobiography (1972), dealt with the first ten years of her marriage to fellow writer Terence Brady. The couple, who have two children, later adapted Coronet Among the Grass and Coronet Among the Weeds, into the TV sitcom No, Honestly. Bingham and her husband collaborated on the scripts for three early episodes of Upstairs, Downstairs, "Board Wages", "I Dies from Love" and "Out of the Everywhere". They later wrote an accompanying book called Rose's Story. They also wrote the episodes of Take Three Girls featuring Victoria (Liza Goddard). In the 1970s, Brady and Bingham wrote episodes for the TV series Play for Today, Three Comedies of Marriage, Yes, Honestly and Robin's Nest. During the 1980s and 1990s, they continued to write for the occasional TV series and adapted Jilly Cooper's novel Riders for the television film Riders (1993).

Bingham later commented that by the 1970s, writing for television was highly paid. In Britain, £1,000 was a typical payment for a television script, about ten times as much as the advance for a novel, and equivalent to more than £10,000 in 2025.

=== Later work ===
Beginning in the 1980s, Bingham became a romantic novelist, writing novels including To Hear a Nightingale, The Business and In Sunshine or in Shadow. Most of her books are set in the 19th and 20th centuries. In 1996, she won the Romantic Novel of the Year Award from the Romantic Novelists' Association.

== Personal life and death ==
Bingham and Terence Brady were living together by 1963 and were married in 1964. They had one daughter and one son. In the 1980s, the family moved from Richmond upon Thames to the 18th-century Old Rectory in a Somerset village, with paddocks for horses. Brady died in 2016.

Bingham died on 16 November 2025, at the age of 83.

== Bibliography ==
=== Non fiction ===
- Coronet Among the Weeds (1963)
- Coronet Among the Grass (1972)
- MI5 And Me (2018)
- Spies and Stars: MI5, Showbusiness and Me (2019)

=== Novels ===
- Lucinda (1966)
- The Business (1989)
- In Sunshine or in Shadow (1991)
- Stardust (1992)
- Nanny (1993)
- Change of Heart (1994)
- Grand Affair (1997)
- Love Song (1998)
- The Kissing Garden (1999)
- Country Wedding (1999)
- The Blue Note (2000)
- The Love Knot (2000)
- Summertime (2001)
- Distant Music (2002)
- The Magic Hour (2005)
- Friday's Girl (2005)
- Out of the Blue (2006)
- In Distant Fields (2006)
- The White Marriage (2007)
- Goodnight Sweetheart (2007)
- The Enchanted (2008)
- The Land of Summer (2008)
- The Daisy Club (2009)

=== Love Quartet ===
1. Belgravia (1983)
2. Country Life (1985)
3. At Home (1986)
4. By Invitation (1993)

=== Nightingale Saga ===
1. To Hear a Nightingale (1988)
2. The Nightingale Sings (1996)

=== Debutantes Saga ===
1. Debutantes (1995)
2. The Season (2001)

=== The Bexham Trilogy ===
1. The Chestnut Tree (2002)
2. The Wind Off the Sea (2003)
3. The Moon at Midnight (2003)

=== Eden Saga ===
1. Daughters of Eden (2004)
2. The House of Flowers (2004)

=== Mums on the Run Series ===
1. Mums on the Run (2010)
2. A Dip Before Breakfast (2012)

=== With Terence Brady ===
==== Victoria Series ====
1. Victoria (1972)
2. Victoria and Company (1974)

==== Honestly Series ====
1. No, Honestly (1974)
2. Yes, Honestly (1977)

==== Upstairs, Downstairs Series ====
1. Rose's Story (1972)
