= Terence Brady (writer) =

Irish actor and writer (1939–2016)

- Born: Terence Joseph Brady; 13 March 1939; London, England
- Died: 29 September 2016 (aged 77); Somerset, England
- Occupations: Actor, Writer
- Spouse: Charlotte Bingham (m. 1964–2016)
- Children: Candida Brady (born 1965); Matthew Brady (born 1972)

Terence Joseph Brady (13 March 1939 – 29 September 2016) was an Irish actor and writer. He was married to fellow writer Charlotte Bingham, with whom he collaborated on several television series.

Brady was born in London to Irish parents, and went to Trinity College, Dublin, where he acted in student productions. He relocated to London in 1961, where he appeared in Beyond the Fringe and met Bingham, who was looking for a "real man" among the weeds of her life as a debutante. They were living together by 1963, married in 1964, and had two children, Matthew and Candida.

Together, Brady and Bingham wrote for television series such as Upstairs, Downstairs, Yes, Honestly, No, Honestly and Pig in the Middle, and adapted Jilly Cooper's book Riders for the miniseries Riders (1993). As well as being an amateur musician, Brady had an interest in breeding racehorses and wrote a cookery column for the Daily Mail. As an actor, Brady appeared in TV programmes including Nanny, Three Rousing Tinkles, Mrs Thursday, and Z-Cars.
