= News from the Front =

- Upstairs, Downstairs episode
- Episode no.: Series 4 Episode 2
- Directed by: Derek Bennett
- Written by: John Hawkesworth
- Production code: 2
- Original air date: 21 September 1974

Episode chronology
← Previous "A Patriotic Offering"	Next → "The Beastly Hun"

"News from the Front" is the second episode of the fourth series of the period drama Upstairs, Downstairs. It first aired on 21 September 1974 on ITV.

== Background ==
"News from the Front" had the working title of "Straight from the Horse's Mouth" and it was recorded on 18 and 19 April 1974, with the location work being filmed on 8 April 1974. Miles Bennett, who made a brief appearance as a telegraph boy, was the son of director Derek Bennett. The plot has some similarity to the Shell Crisis of 1915 in which the Liberal Government was brought down because it was widely perceived that the production of artillery shells for use by the British Army was inadequate, with the story being reported in The Times.

== Plot ==
"News from the Front" is set in April 1915. Hazel receives a telegram, something which everyone dreads as it usually brings bad news. However, it merely says that James is coming home from the Western Front on leave following the Second Battle of Ypres. On his first night home, he has dinner with Richard, Hazel, Sir Geoffrey Dillon and General Nesfield. During the evening, he talks about the incompetent running of the war, saying the Army is "being squandered by a lot of amateurs who don't know their job". Sir Geoffrey, who is the lawyer for newspaper baron Lord Northcliffe, wants to use James' comments to bring down Asquith's Liberal Government, and days later a report of James' account is published in The Daily Mail, which is owned by Lord Northcliffe. While the account does not name James, his commanding officer, Colonel Buchanan, soon works out it can only have been him, and he is transferred, against his wishes, to the post of General Staff Officer, miles behind the front line. James is furious with the decision, but there is nothing he can do to stop it.

Meanwhile, downstairs, Edward, now Private Barnes, comes back to Eaton Place for the weekend after training on Salisbury Plain. He proposes to Daisy while in a picture palace, and she says yes. The night before he goes back to camp, they have sex for the first time, after both admitting they are still virgins.

== Cast ==
- Angela Baddeley - Mrs Bridges
- Gordon Jackson - Hudson
- Meg Wynn Owen - Hazel Bellamy
- Simon Williams - James Bellamy
- David Langton - Richard Bellamy
- Raymond Huntley - Sir Geoffrey Dillon
- Christopher Beeny - Edward
- Jacqueline Tong - Daisy
- Jenny Tomasin - Ruby
- Barrie Cookson - Colonel Buchanan
- Edward Underdown - General Nesfield
- Miles Bennett - The Telegraph Boy
- Ena Baga - Kinema Pianist

== Reception ==
"News from the Front" was reviewed in The Daily Mail by Shaun Usher, who called the programme "distinguished" and said how John Hawkesworth "takes pains to show what it was like to live half a century ago". However, Usher would later go on to be critical of Upstairs, Downstairs after the episode Missing Believed Killed.
