= Missing Believed Killed =

- Upstairs, Downstairs episode
- Episode no.: Season 4 Episode 11
- Directed by: Christopher Hodson
- Written by: Jeremy Paul
- Production code: 11
- Original air date: 23 November 1974

Episode chronology
← Previous "The Hero's Farewell"	Next → "Facing Fearful Odds"

"Missing Believed Killed" is the eleventh episode of the fourth series of the period drama Upstairs, Downstairs. It first aired on 23 November 1974 on ITV.

== Background ==
Missing Believed Killed was recorded in the studio on 22 and 23 August 1974. The outside scenes at the hospital were filmed at Waddesdon Manor in Buckinghamshire on 13 August. Waddesdon Manor had also been used for the French château scenes in the earlier episode If You Were the Only Girl in the World. In this episode, Gareth Hunt made what was then a one-off appearance as James's batman Trooper Norton. However, he impressed the programme makers and was offered a regular part and in series five returned to become the footman.

== Plot ==
It is October 1917, and it has been a week since James was reported "missing believed killed". His batman, Trooper Norton, delivers his belongings to Eaton Place. However, days later James turns up at Georgina's hospital in France. A piece of shell is removed from just above his right knee, which went slightly gangrenous and a shell also grazed his forehead. He is also suffering from shock and exposure, and he has run a high fever.

James is comforted by Georgina's presence in the hospital, and Georgina has become attached to caring for her step-cousin. Richard and Hazel travel out to France and intend to bring him home with a private ambulance hired by Lady Southwold, Lady Marjorie's mother. Georgina thinks James will not survive the journey and argues with Hazel and Richard, but they take him back anyway. James later lends some credence to Georgina's concerns, admitting that the journey over muddy roads and the channel crossing "nearly killed [him]."

Once back at Eaton Place, James has a private nurse to look after him. He tells Hazel that the scent from the flowers she has placed in his room remind him of the smell of gas, and he expresses regret that she has become a nurse, not a wife. One night he feels hungry, having previously lost his appetite, and a delighted Hazel and Mrs Bridges make him a snack. However, James has begun to exhibit the flashes of irritation and temper that would characterize his behaviour for the rest of the series, lashing out not just about his hunger but about the comfort of his wound dressings and even the appearance of a decorative urn. To thank the servants for their hard work and support, Hazel treats them and pays for them to go and see a George Robey show.

On his father's birthday, James makes it to the Morning Room to surprise him. Hazel is concerned, noting that Dr. Foley asked James to remain in bed for ten weeks, but James dismisses the doctor's ability to appreciate the psychological impact of his experiences after he was injured. He and Hazel appear to mend fences after some rocky times in their relationship, with James expressing profound gratitude at being surrounded by "good care and attention, and love." He asks Hazel to leave him and his father alone when Richard returns, and Richard expresses joy at seeing James up and in the Morning Room. James then tells his father about his ten days missing; a German officer was patrolling the battlefield after the conflict, shooting wounded soldiers. He stopped at the shell hole in which James was lying, raised his weapon, but then lowered it and looked in James's eyes. This gives James enough time to unholster his own pistol and shoot the German soldier in the head, but not before feeling an intense connection with the soldier. After ultimately spending three days in the shell hole, he is taken captive and moved to a German dressing station, but wanders out into the smoke and chaos in a fevered attempt to escape the chatter of the prisoner in bed next to him. He wanders for an indeterminate time before being picked up at a Canadian dressing station. Richard is able to fill in this gap and explains that the Canadians transferred him to Georgina's hospital. James also says he felt his mother's presence while in the shell hole.

The episode ends with James emotionally and physically broken. His encounter with the German soldier leaves him tormented by the feeling that he should have been the one who died, and his few minutes in the morning room plus a glass of champagne leave him giddy and unable to continue to hold himself upright, so Richard helps him up the stairs and back to bed.

== Cast ==
- Meg Wynn Owen - Hazel Bellamy
- Jean Marsh - Rose
- Angela Baddeley - Mrs Bridges
- David Langton - Richard Bellamy
- Lesley-Anne Down - Georgina Worsley
- Simon Williams - James Bellamy
- Christopher Beeny - Edward
- Jenny Tomasin - Ruby
- Jacqueline Tong - Daisy
- Patricia Macrae - Sister Menzies
- Celia Imrie - Jenny
- Gareth Hunt - Trooper Norton
- Brian Badcoe - Surgeon Major Rice
- Ann Martin - Nurse Wilkins
