= The Hero's Farewell =

- Upstairs, Downstairs episode
- Episode no.: Season 4 Episode 10
- Directed by: Bill Bain
- Written by: Rosemary Anne Sisson
- Production code: 10
- Original air date: 16 November 1974

Episode chronology
← Previous "Another Year"	Next → "Missing Believed Killed"

The Hero's Farewell is the tenth episode of the fourth series of the period drama Upstairs, Downstairs. It first aired on 16 November 1974 on ITV.

== Background ==
The Hero's Farewell was recorded in the studio on 8 and 9 August 1974. Rosemary Anne Sisson used the diaries of Lady Cynthia Asquith as inspiration for this episode, as she had for her earlier episode Tug of War. It is set shortly before October 1917.

== Plot ==
Lady Prudence brings Mr. Gerald Maitland, a famous actor, to 165 Eaton Place after German bombing has destroyed many of the prominent houses in London, and persuades Richard to hold a series of historical tableaux, entitled The Hero's Farewell, in aid of the Red Cross. Since Lady Prudence knows Hazel would never agree, she takes advantage of Hazel's being in Eastbourne to plan the event. Lady Prudence and Gerald Maitland present tableaux of "Anthony and Cleopatra", "Lord Nelson and Lady Hamilton", and "Columbus and Queen Isabella". Georgina is home on leave and is chosen to portray Florence Nightingale, while Ruby is to portray a Belgian peasant girl with Lady Prudence as a German officer. Lady Prudence asks Hudson to wear a kilt to show in the guests, but he refuses.

Meanwhile, Mrs Bridges and Ruby go to a "War Cooking" lecture after pressure from Mr Hudson. Mrs Bridges starts to make meals from leftovers, including "Win the War Pie", much to everyone's distaste.

At the dress rehearsal for the historical tableaux, an air raid strikes and Ruby becomes hysterical. The whole household takes shelter in the basement, while Hudson goes out as a special sergeant. When he comes back, he faints, having been hit by a piece of shrapnel and goes to hospital. The day after the raid, a telegraph arrives; James is "missing believed killed".

== Cast ==
- Gordon Jackson - Hudson
- Joan Benham - Lady Prudence Fairfax
- Angela Baddeley - Mrs Bridges
- Jean Marsh - Rose
- David Langton - Richard Bellamy
- Lesley-Anne Down - Georgina Worsley
- Christopher Beeny - Edward
- Jacqueline Tong - Daisy
- Jenny Tomasin - Ruby
- Christopher Good - Major Philip Hanning
- Robin Bailey - Gerald Maitland
- Phyllida Law - Lady Constance Weir
- Fanny Rowe - Duchess of Mitcham
- Alfred Maron - Carpenter
