= Peace Out of Pain =

- Upstairs, Downstairs episode
- Episode no.: Season 4 Episode 13
- Directed by: Christopher Hodson
- Written by: Alfred Shaughnessy
- Production code: 13
- Original air date: 7 December 1974

Episode chronology
← Previous "Facing Fearful Odds"	Next → "On With the Dance"

Peace Out of Pain is the thirteenth and final episode of the fourth series of the period drama Upstairs, Downstairs. It first aired on 7 December 1974 on ITV.

== Background ==
Peace Out of Pain was recorded in the studio on 19 and 20 September 1974. In this episode, Meg Wynn Owen makes her final appearance as Hazel Bellamy. Peace Out of Pain was watched by 7.20 million people.

== Plot ==
It is November 1918 and James and Hazel argue, it is implied that James strikes her, and Hazel runs out crying. When Rose comforts her on the stairs, she realises that Hazel has a temperature. Dr Foley soon comes round and tells Hazel that she has caught the Spanish flu, currently a pandemic. Hazel and James make up, but on 9 November 1918 Hazel dies at Eaton Place. Rose is greatly upset. The funeral is held on 11 November, the day the war ends, at St Mark's Church in Wimbledon. Rose, Hudson, Mrs Bridges and Ruby attend while Edward and Daisy stay behind. Daisy wants to start a new life outside of service and wants to give two weeks' notice, but Edward is more hesitant. That evening, James insists that Georgina, who had been sent home from France due to exhaustion, go to an Armistice Party, while Edward, Daisy and Ruby also go out and celebrate.

Meanwhile, Virginia Hamilton sends a letter to Richard saying she will be arriving in London with her two children that evening. Richard rushes to meet her, and at dinner that evening she agrees to marry him, he having asked her by letter. They plan to move north of Hyde Park after their marriage. Rose discovers she has been left £1200 following Gregory's death.

== Cast ==
- Jean Marsh – Rose
- Gordon Jackson – Hudson
- Lesley-Anne Down – Georgina Worsley
- Simon Williams – James Bellamy
- Meg Wynn Owen – Hazel Bellamy
- David Langton – Richard Bellamy
- Angela Baddeley – Mrs Bridges
- Hannah Gordon – Virginia Hamilton
- Christopher Beeny – Edward
- Jacqueline Tong – Daisy
- Jenny Tomasin – Ruby
- Anthony Woodruff – Dr Foley

== Bridge story ==
This is the last episode of series 4 and is set in November 1918 while the first episode of the fifth series is set in summer 1919. To explain what happens in the meantime, a story written by Alfred Shaughnessy was published in three parts in Woman magazine from 10 February 1975. This story features a storyline where Georgina falls out with her friends Angela Barclay, Harry and Martin after she discovers she is merely being used by Martin to make Angela jealous. In addition, the story explains Edward and Daisy's exit and Lily's entrance, while Richard goes up to Scotland to meet Virginia's father-in-law. Rose meanwhile briefly goes out with a friend of Gregory's, but soon realises that Gregory was her only true love. The story concludes with the marriage of Richard and Virginia.
