= A Patriotic Offering =

- Upstairs, Downstairs episode
- Episode no.: Series 4 Episode 1
- Directed by: Derek Bennett
- Written by: Rosemary Anne Sisson
- Production code: 1
- Original air date: 14 September 1974

Guest appearances
- Madame Chargon (Karen Glaser), Celestine (Lisa Moss), Madame Huguot (Elma Soiron), Monsieur Chargon (Cyril Cross), Mrs. Hollins (Lala Lloyd), Jean-Paul (Ian Hoare) and Lady Berkhamstead (Joyce Heron)

Episode chronology
← Previous "The Sudden Storm"	Next → "News from the Front"

A Patriotic Offering is the first episode of the fourth series of the period drama Upstairs, Downstairs. It first aired on 14 September 1974 on ITV.

== Plot ==
Monsieur Chargon comes to Eaton Place with his daughter (Madame Chargon) and his daughter in law (Madame Huguot). They are refugees of the War in Belgium and they tell a story of death and terror. Monsieur Chargon is the father of Madame Chargon and the grandfather of the little boy Jean-Paul and the little girl Celestine. His wife went missing and was never found. His son and grandson were killed in the fighting at the hands of the invading Germans and his little granddaughter died . Madame Chargon is the daughter of the old man Monsieur Chargon. Her husband was executed by the Germans. She came together with her little son Jean-Paul and her little daughter Celestine. Madame Huguot is married to the old man's son. She lost her husband and son (only 16 years old) in the fighting and her little daughter in her arms was killed in bombing. Only the daughter's doll remained. The refugees are initially met with hostility from the Eaton Place staff but as understanding grows, so does co-operation.

== Cast ==
Regular cast

- Angela Baddeley - Mrs Bridges
- Gordon Jackson - Hudson
- Meg Wynn Owen - Hazel Bellamy
- David Langton - Richard Bellamy
- Christopher Beeny - Edward
- Jacqueline Tong - Daisy
- Jenny Tomasin - Ruby

Guest cast

- Mrs. Hollins (Lala Lloyd)
- grandfather Monsieur Chargon (Cyril Cross)
- daughter Madame Chargon (Karen Glaser)
- daughter in law Madame Huguot (Elma Soiron)
- granddaughter Celestine (Lisa Moss)
- grandson Jean-Paul (Ian Hoare)
- Lady Berkhamstead (Joyce Heron)
