= Another Year (Upstairs, Downstairs) =

- Upstairs, Downstairs episode
- Episode no.: Season 4 Episode 9
- Directed by: Cyril Coke
- Written by: Alfred Shaughnessy
- Production code: 9
- Original air date: 9 November 1974

Episode chronology
| ← Previous "The Glorious Dead" | Next → "The Hero's Farewell" |

"Another Year" is the ninth episode of the fourth series of the period drama Upstairs, Downstairs. It first aired on 9 November 1974 on ITV.

== Background ==
"Another Year" was recorded in the studio on 25 and 26 July 1974. In this episode, Hannah Gordon made her debut as Virginia.

== Plot ==
On 27 December 1916, Daisy gets a letter from Edward telling her that he is coming home for a fortnight's leave and he will arrive at Eaton Place on New Year's Eve. When he arrives, he is subdued and shortly after midnight on 31 December, he leaves the party downstairs and Richard comes across him crying on the stairs. Richard then takes him into the Morning Room and gives him a whisky. Edward then tells him how Charlie Wallace, his best friend and best man, was killed by a shell going off. This talk cheers him up, but shortly after going downstairs, he breaks down again, with Mrs. Bridges comforting him. Shortly after, Richard asks Sir Geoffrey to lean on General Frank Nesfield to get Edward discharged on grounds of severe shell shock. Edward is soon sent to Barnes Hospital for treatment.

Meanwhile, Mrs Charles Hamilton, a widow from Inverness, comes to see Richard. She is the chairman of a committee of Royal Navy widows who want to raise money to educate the children of Navy and Marine officers killed in action. She asks Richard, as Civil Lord of the Admiralty, for Admiralty backing and money, but Richard merely gives her the details of an official to write to. However, the following day Richard is given a dressing down by the First Lord of the Admiralty Sir Edward Carson after Carson had accidentally met Mrs Hamilton at dinner the night before. She had told him about Richard's unhelpful attitude, and the First Lord orders Richard to help. In addition, Mrs Hamilton's father-in-law is the second cousin of Admiral Beatty. Virginia then comes round to apologise for getting Richard into trouble.

Richard is offered a viscountcy in the 1917 New Year's Honours. After taking Sir Geoffrey's advice, he takes the title Viscount Bellamy of Haversham, Haversham being a town two miles from his birthplace in Norfolk.

At 3am on the morning of 20 January 1917, Ruby arrives at Eaton Place. She had been caught up in the Silvertown explosion the previous evening and the whole household listens to her story. Her lodgings have been destroyed along with all her possessions, and she decides to become the kitchen maid again. When Richard and Hazel go up to the Morning Room after this, Hazel says how there are two families living in 165, Eaton Place. There is the Bellamy family, and then the family downstairs. Hudson and Bridges are the father and mother, Edward and Daisy their son and daughter-in-law, Rose is the elder daughter and Ruby the younger daughter. She then says "Perhaps one day, we'll all be one big family, not two". Richard replies "I think we are now in one sense".

== Cast ==
- Jean Marsh - Rose
- Angela Baddeley - Mrs Bridges
- Gordon Jackson - Hudson
- Meg Wynn Owen - Hazel Bellamy
- Hannah Gordon - Virginia Hamilton
- David Langton - Richard Bellamy
- Raymond Huntley - Sir Geoffrey Dillon
- Christopher Beeny - Edward
- Jacqueline Tong - Daisy
- Jenny Tomasin - Ruby

== Reception ==
"Another Year" earned Alfred Shaughnessy a second Emmy nomination for Best Writer. In addition, Peter Knight, writing in The Daily Telegraph, said that while Upstairs, Downstairs was getting "further and further away from its original concept", the "characters and the dialogue all carry a total conviction which makes it the best-quality soap opera around".
