= Facing Fearful Odds =

- Upstairs, Downstairs episode
- Episode no.: Season 4 Episode 12
- Directed by: Raymond Menmuir
- Written by: John Hawkesworth
- Production code: 12
- Original air date: 30 November 1974

Episode chronology
| ← Previous "Missing Believed Killed" | Next → "Peace Out of Pain" |

"Facing Fearful Odds" is the twelfth episode of the fourth series of the period drama Upstairs, Downstairs. It first aired on 30 November 1974 on ITV.

== Background ==
Facing Fearful Odds was recorded in the studio on 5 and 6 September 1974.

== Plot ==
On 27 April 1918, Virginia Hamilton, a navy widow, arrives in London by train and Hazel takes her to 165 Eaton Place after finding her in her canteen. She tells Hazel and Richard how her elder son, Acting Sub-lieutenant Michael Hamilton, was arrested in Dover for cowardice. On 23 April, he was in charge of a coastal motorboat off Ostend after his commanding officer had been killed and was accused of failing to encourage his crew to fight. Sir Geoffrey Dillon is suggested to represent him and Michael tells Sir Geoffrey how he could not move at the time. Sir Geoffrey tells Michael not to admit his feeling of guilt to the hearing, which will be held in Dover.

At the court-martial, Sir Geoffrey summarizes that when Michael originally spoke to his superior after the attack, he blamed himself so the Chief Petty Officer could get the recognition he deserved. While the court finds Michael guilty, Michael is only reprimanded – the minimum sentence – due to the circumstances of the incident. However, days later, Michael is killed in action in Ostend, having acted bravely. Richard feels guilty as he has pulled strings, at Michael's request, to give Michael a chance to prove himself. Virginia reassures him that her late husband would have done the same. Richard is equally impressed by her bravery.

James is feeling depressed and neglected, and Rose is on holiday at Southwold. Edward, meanwhile appointed a lance corporal, goes AWOL the day before he is due to go back to France. The Royal Military Police arrive at 165, and after Hudson tells Daisy that the punishment for going AWOL is the execution by firing squad, she tells them Edward is hiding in his father's bombed-out house in Walthamstow. Edward is then sent to France.

== Cast ==
- Gordon Jackson – Hudson
- Angela Baddeley – Mrs Bridges
- David Langton – Richard Bellamy
- Meg Wynn Owen – Hazel Bellamy
- Hannah Gordon – Virginia Hamilton
- Raymond Huntley – Sir Geoffrey Dillon
- Simon Williams – James Bellamy
- Christopher Beeny – Edward
- Jacqueline Tong – Daisy
- Jenny Tomasin – Ruby
- Richard Reeves – A/SLt. Michael Hamilton, RN
- Hilary Minster – Lt. Lightfoot, RN
- Laurence Harrington – Chief Petty Officer Webb
- Anthony Nash – President of the Court
- Peter Whitaker – Judge Advocate
