= Tug of War (Upstairs, Downstairs) =

- Upstairs, Downstairs episode
- Georgina Worsley as a nurse
- Episode no.: Season 4 Episode 5
- Directed by: Derek Bennett
- Written by: Rosemary Anne Sisson
- Production code: 5
- Original air date: 12 October 1974

Episode chronology
← Previous "Women shall not Weep"	Next → "Home Fires"

"Tug of War" is the fifth episode of the fourth series of the television period drama Upstairs, Downstairs. It first aired on 12 October 1974 on ITV.

== Background ==
Tug of War was filmed on 30 and 31 May 1974. The writer, Rosemary Anne Sisson, had used the diaries of Lady Cynthia Asquith, who like Georgina was a society VAD nurse, while writing this episode. Polly Williams, who played Lady Viola Courtney, was the sister of Simon Williams, who played James Bellamy.

== Plot ==
In a letter to Daisy, Edward suggests that she get a job at a munitions factory. Daisy, who is tired of doing the work Ruby would have been doing as well as sharing Edward's duties with Rose, sees an advert in a newspaper for an omnibus conductor. However, before Daisy can apply, Rose secretly applies and makes Daisy furious when she gets the job. Rose soon starts to work as a bus conductor during the day, and does her household duties in the evening.

Georgina finds that being a nurse is more difficult and less glamorous than she had thought it would be, and finds that she is only nursing sick old women. She also has to look after two new nurses, her good friend Angela Barclay and the fearless Lady Viola Courtney. One night they go to a party, but return too late and the hospital gates are locked. The following day, Georgina is told that her patient, Mrs Carbury, died overnight and was asking for her. She feels very guilty, but the matron does not dismiss her as Georgina has the makings of a good nurse.

Meanwhile, James is home on leave. Richard refuses to help him get back onto the front line from his current staff job. However, Hazel secretly goes to see his company colonel, Colonel Buchanan, and asks for James to be moved back to the front line. The Colonel refuses to discuss the matter but actually agrees, and James is assigned to set up the Guards Division's newly formed Machine Gun Corps.

== Cast ==
- Meg Wynn Owen - Hazel Bellamy
- Lesley-Anne Down - Georgina Worsley
- Jean Marsh - Rose
- David Langton - Richard Bellamy
- Gordon Jackson - Hudson
- Angela Baddeley - Mrs Bridges
- Jacqueline Tong - Daisy
- Simon Williams - James Bellamy
- Valerie Lush - Matron
- Barrie Cookson - Colonel Buchanan
- Betty England - Mrs Carbury
- Betty Romaine - Mrs Blaine
- Mel Churcher - Angela Barclay
- Polly Williams - Lady Viola Courtney (Note: In the closing credits of Tug of War, Polly Williams' character was credited as "Lady Violet Courtney", despite always being referred to in the episode as "Viola".)
- Richenda Carey - Head Nurse
- Christopher Good - Captain Philip Hanning

== Reception ==
Tug of War was praised by Hazel Holt, who wrote in The Stage and Television Today, who said that this was "the best episode for some time". Holt said that Rosemary Anne Sisson wrote so "we knew exactly how it felt to be politician, a VAD or the wife of a serving officer in 1916". However, she said that Sisson did not "breathe life into the downstairs menage", and said the servants were becoming "set and predictable".
