= The Beastly Hun =

- Upstairs, Downstairs episode
- Episode no.: Season 4 Episode 3
- Directed by: Bill Bain
- Written by: Jeremy Paul
- Production code: 3
- Original air date: 28 September 1974

Episode chronology
← Previous "News from the Front"	Next → "Women Shall Not Weep"

"The Beastly Hun" is the third episode of the fourth series of the period drama Upstairs, Downstairs. It first aired on 28 September 1974 on ITV.

== Background ==
"The Beastly Hun" was recorded on 2 and 3 May 1974. It shows the anti-German feeling in Britain at the time it is set and how the press reported it.

== Plot ==
It is May 1915, and Hudson is reading out reports about German spies and horrific atrocities to the other servants. Later, while helping Rose, Daisy and Mrs Bridges pack some items for the Front, Hazel finds a magazine belonging to Hudson called The Beastly Hun. Hazel is disgusted by what she reads, and orders Hudson to stop spreading these "stories". One story Hazel mentions is a true historical event from 1914: that of nurse Grace Hume's supposed torture and murder in Belgium, revealed later as a hoax. Hudson is forced to give in, but clearly his views have not changed on "those pigs, the Huns". He cites two cases of German spies. Soon after, Hudson reads out to the other servants the news report of the Lusitania being sunk by a German submarine. The anti-German feeling in Britain increases. This prompts Hudson into going and volunteering for the Army. However, he is turned away because of poor eyesight and given an exemption certificate. Mrs Bridges then suggests that he become a special constable. He gets permission from Richard, leading to an argument with Hazel who is annoyed that Richard did not ask her first. Within days Hudson has his first shift.

Following the sacking of Winston Churchill as First Lord of the Admiralty, Bonar Law and Arthur Balfour come round to Eaton Place and Richard is offered the post of Civil Lord of the Admiralty. This makes him part of the Government. Also, Lt. Dennis Kemp, who had fallen in love with Georgina, is killed days after arriving at the Front. When Hazel tells Georgina this, she doesn't react, telling Hazel she refuses to "fall in love with any of them" because she doesn't "want to mourn them". She tells Hazel her friends take a similar attitude towards the young officers.

On the evening of Hudson's first shift, guard duty at a power station, the Bellamys' local baker, Albert Schoenfeld and his wife, second-generation British citizens, and his British-born son come to the servants' hall asking for refuge. Their house and shop have been attacked and vandalised because of their German surname. Mrs Bridges, Rose, Ruby and Daisy, for whom the Schoenfelds had baked a special birthday cake days before, invite them in, but when Hudson returns he goes straight up to Mr Bellamy. He says that they may stay the night, but must go to the police first thing in the morning. However, Maria Schoenfeld, aware of Hudson's feeling towards them, insists they go that evening. Mrs Schoenfeld points out that she had heard something else about the Lusitania sinking: far from the official story, Canadian soldiers and armaments were being transported on the ship secretly. After the Schoenfelds leave, Hudson is left visibly upset, confused and alone.

== Cast ==
- Gordon Jackson - Hudson
- Lesley-Anne Down - Georgina Worsley
- Meg Wynn Owen - Hazel Bellamy
- Jean Marsh - Rose
- Angela Baddeley - Mrs Bridges
- David Langton - Richard Bellamy
- Jenny Tomasin - Ruby
- Jacqueline Tong - Daisy
- Timothy Peters - Lt. Dennis Kemp
- Gertan Klauber - Albert Schoenfeld
- Freda Dowie - Maria Schoenfeld
- Keith Jayne - Wilfred Schoenfeld
- Robert Swann - Medical Officer
- Giles Watling - 2nd Lt. James Marriott

== Reception ==
Gordon Jackson won an Emmy Award for Outstanding Single Performance by a Supporting Actor for this episode.
