= A Place in the World (Upstairs, Downstairs) =

- Upstairs, Downstairs episode
- Episode no.: Season 5 Episode 2
- Directed by: Christopher Hodson
- Written by: Jeremy Paul
- Production code: 2
- Original air date: 14 September 1975

Episode chronology
← Previous "On With the Dance"	Next → "Laugh a Little Louder Please"

"A Place in the World" is the second episode of the fifth and final series of the period drama Upstairs, Downstairs. It first aired on 14 September 1975 on ITV.

== Background ==
A Place in the World was recorded in the studio on 23 and 24 January 1975, with the location footage having been filmed in Rotherhithe, London on 20 January.

== Plot ==
It is February 1920, and James writes a letter to The Times about the unemployment, poverty and homelessness of former soldiers, voicing his strong disagreement with how these soldiers are treated. Sir Geoffrey then tells James that Conservative Central Office were impressed and, after some persuading, James agrees to stand in a forthcoming by-election for Parliament. The seat is Rotherhithe East, a safe Labour seat in the working class London Docklands. After James initially ignores his father's help and alienates Conservative Central Office by striking a much more left-wing tone than the Conservatives would like by talking about his experiences in the World War I trenches and his respect for the working class soldiers that he worked alongside at the front, James is soon persuaded by Virginia to allow Richard to help him in his campaign. Richard and Virginia attend a campaign rally that James is holding the day before the by-election, but James is verbally criticized, heckled and attacked by some members of the audience who are Socialists and Marxists, and the hall then descends into chaos. In the election, the Labour Party candidate gets 18,928 votes, and James gets 7,369 votes as the Conservative Party candidate. While Conservative Central Office is pleased with James' performance and wants him to continue with his political career, James is disappointed and says he will not stand for Parliament again. However, James is pleased when Hudson tells him that he reduced the Labour majority in the Rotherhithe East constituency by 639 votes.

Meanwhile, Edward and Daisy visit downstairs. They are visibly experiencing financial hardship and Daisy has had a miscarriage. They leave in embarrassment after Edward argues with Mr Hudson when their poverty becomes clear. Soon after, Frederick delivers a pair of shoes to Daisy from Mrs Bridges, and Edward is enraged when she accepts them. In the meantime, Hudson has suggested to Virginia that she employ the couple. Daisy leaps at the chance when Virginia offers them jobs and the flat above the garage; Edward accepts less enthusiastically. Edward becomes chauffeur and valet to James on a wage of £40 year, while Daisy replaces Rose as head parlourmaid on a wage of £35 a year. Rose, who is away from London following the death of her aunt, is to become Lady Bellamy's lady's maid.

== Cast ==
- Gordon Jackson - Hudson
- Angela Baddeley - Mrs Bridges
- David Langton - Richard Bellamy
- Raymond Huntley - Sir Geoffrey Dillon
- Hannah Gordon - Virginia Bellamy
- Simon Williams - James Bellamy
- Christopher Beeny - Edward
- Karen Dotrice - Lily
- Gareth Hunt - Frederick
- Jenny Tomasin - Ruby
- Jacqueline Tong - Daisy
- Michael Logan - Arthur Knowles
- Ann Mitchell - Militant Woman
- Jay Neill - First Heckler
- Jack Le White - Second Heckler
- Derek Martin - Third Heckler
- Una Brandon-Jones - Mother
- Brian Nolan - Fourth Heckler

== Reception ==
James Murray reviewed A Place in the World for The Daily Express. He praised writer Jeremy Paul for injecting a "remarkable degree of insight". Murray said that "the confrontation made electrifying television" and the episode "rich and faultless". It ended his review by commenting that he could not see how LWT would be able "to snuff out the lives of the marvellous characters of Eaton Place" at the end of this series.
