= Women Shall Not Weep =

- Upstairs, Downstairs episode
- Episode no.: Season 4 Episode 4
- Directed by: Christopher Hodson
- Written by: Alfred Shaughnessy
- Production code: 4
- Original air date: 5 October 1974

Episode chronology
← Previous "The Beastly Hun"	Next → "Tug of War"

"Women Shall Not Weep" is the fourth episode of the fourth series of the period drama Upstairs, Downstairs. It first aired on 5 October 1974 on ITV.

== Background ==
The interior scenes of "Women Shall Not Weep" were recorded on 16 and 17 May 1974. The location footage, at Marylebone station, was filmed on 12 May. Marylebone was chosen because Charing Cross, which was the station actually used for the transportation of troops, looked too modern and it was decided that Marylebone looked most authentic for a 1915 setting.

== Plot ==
It is about September 1915, and Edward and Daisy have a church wedding. However, Edward and his best friend Charlie Wallace, his best man, are to leave for France that evening. Edward does his best to stay cheerful while at Eaton Place, but is terrified. Georgina gets two of her officer friends, who are also going to the Front that evening, to give him advice. Daisy later accompanies him to the station, and cannot stop herself crying as they said goodbye while Edward is on board the train.

Georgina is also at the station with her friend Angela Barclay to say goodbye to her two officer friends, Captain Martin Adams and 2nd Lt. Harry Gurney. After they have left, Georgina tells Angela that she will stay awhile. She then helps out when a hospital train arrives, and hands out cocoa and cigarettes. One soldier she gives a cigarette dies minutes later, with the cigarette still in his mouth, and Georgina immediately volunteers to be a VAD nurse and soon starts training.

Meanwhile, on her afternoon off, Ruby secretly goes off and gets a job at the Silvertown munitions factory in the Docklands. Mrs Bridges is furious, and as Hazel is at her parents in Wimbledon due to her father having pleurisy, she protests to Richard. But he cannot refuse Ruby permission to leave, and she does so.

== Cast ==
- Gordon Jackson – Hudson
- David Langton – Richard Bellamy
- Simon Williams – James Bellamy
- Lesley-Anne Down – Georgina Worsley
- Jean Marsh – Rose
- Angela Baddeley – Mrs Bridges
- Christopher Beeny – Edward
- Neville Barber – Brigadier-General Temple
- Jacqueline Tong – Daisy
- Dennis Blanch – Private Wallace
- Jenny Tomasin – Ruby
- Mel Churcher – Angela Barclay
- James Woolley – Captain Martin Adams
- Edward Hammond – 2nd Lt. Harry Gurney
- Barbara Atkinson – Mrs Galloway
- Kevin Moran – The Sergeant
- Mike Fields – The Wounded Soldier

== Reception ==
The director, Christopher Hodson, was nominated in the Emmy Awards for Outstanding Director for this episode. In a review of this episode in The Sunday Telegraph, Philip Purser said that Upstairs, Downstairs was "most effectively...now catching the character of that war".
