= The Sudden Storm =

- Upstairs, Downstairs episode
- Episode no.: Season 3 Episode 13
- Directed by: Bill Bain
- Written by: John Hawkesworth
- Production code: 13
- Original air date: 19 January 1974

Episode chronology
← Previous "Distant Thunder"	Next → "A Patriotic Offering"

"The Sudden Storm" is the last episode of the third series of the period drama Upstairs, Downstairs. It first aired on 19 January 1974 on ITV.

== Plot ==
Rose the lady's maid awakens Georgina, who raves about the wonderful ball she attended the previous evening. Downstairs, Ruby is reading a newspaper account of the ball to Edward. Edward then explains that Mr. Lyons, a shopkeeper, will be joining them for lunch, and whispers that Lyons has taken a fancy to Mrs. Bridges. Upstairs, Rose and Daisy are cleaning Georgina's room. Daisy talks about how lovely going to balls must be, but Rose berates her for being too fanciful, and warns her that she better hide her relationship with Edward or risk losing her job. In the morning room, James, Richard, and Hazel have coffee. James, in a typically grumpy mood, casually insists the way to solve the Irish Crisis is to "blow up" Belfast and Dublin, then stalks off to work. Hazel admits to Richard that she and James are not suited to each other, and says she will leave him whether he accepts a job offer in India or not. Mrs Bridges admits to Hudson that she has been seeing Mr Lyons and that her longstanding agreement to marry Hudson is now in doubt.

It is August 1914, and the servants are offered a day's holiday in Herne Bay in Kent. They enjoy a rare day out together, and Hudson goes so far as to offer a song on the vaudeville stage, but his performance is curtailed by the announcement that Britain is about to go to war with Germany. Everyone joins Hudson in singing "Rule Britannia" instead. Mrs Bridges feels humiliated by the appearance of a drunken Mr Lyons, and discontinues her relationship with him.

With Germany's invasion of Belgium, Britain is dragged into war and at 11pm Britain declares war on Germany.

== Cast ==
- Angela Baddeley - Mrs Bridges
- Gordon Jackson - Hudson
- Meg Wynn Owen - Hazel Bellamy
- David Langton - Richard Bellamy
- Christopher Beeny - Edward
- Jacqueline Tong - Daisy
- Jenny Tomasin - Ruby
- Frank Middlemass - Albert Lyons

== Awards ==
Director Bill Bain won an Emmy Award in 1975 for Outstanding Directing in a Drama Series for his work this episode.
