= Home Fires (Upstairs, Downstairs) =

- Upstairs, Downstairs episode
- Rose and Gregory
- Episode no.: Season 4 Episode 6
- Directed by: Bill Bain
- Written by: Jeremy Paul
- Production code: 7
- Original air date: 19 October 1974

Episode chronology
| ← Previous "Tug of War" | Next → "If You Were the Only Girl in the World" |

"Home Fires" is the sixth episode of the fourth series of the period drama Upstairs, Downstairs. It first aired on 19 October 1974 on ITV.

== Background ==
Home Fires was filmed in the studio on 25 and 26 June 1974. The location footage was shot on 17 June 1974 at Barnsbury Square, Islington. The episode was set in 1916, and was the second and final episode featuring Keith Barron as Gregory Wilmot.

== Plot ==
Rose's former fiancée Gregory Wilmot arrives to see Rose, but she is working on the buses. He is now a Sergeant in the ANZACs. While Hudson tells Sgt. Wilmot that Rose is too busy at the moment, Daisy privately tells him what bus route she is on, and he surprises Rose on the bus. They then have tea at the bus depot. Later, when speaking to Hazel, Rose says that she would now be happy to go to Australia with Gregory. When Gregory is put on 48-hour leave for France, he goes to see Hudson and tells him that his feelings for Rose have changed and he doesn't love her as he used to. Hudson then helps him write a letter to Rose telling her this. Shortly after, Hamish Matthews, Gregory's old friend, finds Rose on her bus and brings her to see Gregory at his house. After Gregory admits he doesn't love her, Rose throws her engagement ring, which she'd been given when Gregory proposed on 12 April 1914, across the room and walks out. However, Gregory soon catches up with her at the bus depot and tells Rose how his experiences at Gallipoli have changed how he thinks. They agree to marry once the war is over, and soon tell Richard and Hazel, who both like him. Gregory then insists that he and Rose leave by the front door.

Lady Prudence goes to Eaton Place to suggest that Hazel hold a Wounded Officers' Tea Party in the drawing room. Hazel says there are too few servants to hold the event, and also thinks that ordinary soldiers might be a more deserving cause. But on her way out Lady Prudence asks Hudson whether it would be too much and he says it would not be, making Hazel annoyed that Lady Prudence used Hudson to get her own way. Also, Mrs Bridges is in Yarmouth at her sister and brother-in-law's house, helping out after it was bombed. Mrs Ganton is her temporary replacement.

== Cast ==
- Gordon Jackson - Hudson
- Jean Marsh - Rose
- David Langton - Richard Bellamy
- Meg Wynn Owen - Hazel Bellamy
- Joan Benham - Lady Prudence Fairfax
- Jacqueline Tong - Daisy
- Keith Barron - Gregory Wilmot
- Auriol Smith - Mrs Lorimer
- John Lyons - Charlie
- Julia Sutton - Dorothy Matthews
- Robert McBain - Hamish Matthews
- Audrey Joyce - Mrs Ganton
