= On with the Dance (Upstairs, Downstairs) =

- Upstairs, Downstairs episode
- Episode no.: Season 5 Episode 1
- Directed by: Bill Bain
- Written by: Alfred Shaughnessy
- Production code: 1
- Original air date: 7 September 1975

Episode chronology
← Previous "Peace out of Pain"	Next → "A Place in the World"

"On with the Dance" is the first episode of the fifth and final series of the period drama Upstairs, Downstairs. It first aired on 7 September 1975 on ITV.

== Background ==
"On with the Dance" was recorded in the studio on 9 and 10 January 1975, with a retake filmed on the morning of 7 April. It is the first episode to feature Anne Yarker and Jonathan Seeley as Virginia's children, Alice and William, and Karen Dotrice as the maid Lily Hawkins. The events between the end of series 4 and this episode are covered in a bridge story.

== Plot ==
"On with the Dance" opens some months after the end of World War I on 19 July 1919, and the Victory Parade is passing near Eaton Place. Georgina is taking part, and Rose and Lily go on the street to watch while Hudson and Mrs Bridges use Hudson's deerstalking telescope to view the parade from an upstairs window. Edward and Daisy have left service and been replaced by Frederick Norton, James's former batman, and Lily Hawkins. Edward, now a door-to-door salesman, and Daisy, who is pregnant, visit Eaton Place. However, there is a tense atmosphere when the couple see how easily they have been replaced, and they do not stay long.

Richard and Virginia return from their honeymoon in Paris, having also been to Versailles for the signing of the eponymous treaty, and they start looking for a new house. With only Georgina and James living at Eaton Place, there is not enough work for the servants to do. After Virginia refuses to move to 165, James gives the servants a month's notice and says that he will sell the house. However, a week or so later James and Georgina entertain Virginia's children, William and Alice, for the afternoon while she and Richard go shopping. When they return to collect the children, William and Alice say what a wonderful time they have had. James and Georgina then persuade Virginia to move to Eaton Place with Richard and her children.

== Cast ==
- Jean Marsh - Rose
- Angela Baddeley - Mrs Bridges
- Gordon Jackson - Hudson
- Lesley-Anne Down - Georgina Worsley
- Simon Williams - James Bellamy
- David Langton - Richard Bellamy
- Hannah Gordon - Virginia Bellamy
- Christopher Beeny - Edward
- Karen Dotrice - Lily
- Jenny Tomasin - Ruby
- Jacqueline Tong - Daisy
- Gareth Hunt - Frederick
- Anne Yarker - Alice Hamilton
- Jonathan Seely - William Hamilton
