= The Glorious Dead (Upstairs, Downstairs) =

- Upstairs, Downstairs episode
- Episode no.: Season 4 Episode 8
- Directed by: Raymond Menmuir
- Written by: Elizabeth Jane Howard
- Production code: 8
- Original air date: 2 November 1974

Episode chronology
← Previous "If You Were the Only Girl in the World"	Next → "Another Year"

"The Glorious Dead" is the eighth episode of the fourth series of the period drama Upstairs, Downstairs. It was first broadcast on 2 November 1974 on ITV.

== Background ==
"The Glorious Dead" was filmed on 11 and 12 July 1974. While Elizabeth Jane Howard was credited as the writer, the script editor Alfred Shaughnessy largely rewrote Howard's script. The episode was set in 1916.

== Plot ==
Rose gets a letter from Gregory's company commander telling her that her fiancé Gregory has been killed at Fromelles, having been shot by a sniper while returning from morning patrol. Mrs Bridges comforts Rose and tells her how when she was a kitchen maid over 30 years ago, she fell for a groom called Frederick, who later died of a fever in Sudan while he was acting as a batman. Mrs Bridges then advises that Rose goes to see a spiritualist called Madame Francini, which Rose does; but when Waltzing Matilda plays during the séance, she breaks down and runs out of the house.

James is awarded the Military Cross and comes home on leave. Just before James arrives home, Hazel reads in the newspaper that Lt. Jack Dyson MC has been killed in an aerial battle, but she immediately has to comfort Rose when she comes back from Madame Francini's. Then James arrives home and Hazel has to hide her grief. A changed and depressed James tells Hazel all about the war and his latest experiences at the ongoing Battle of the Somme, how he has now lost all faith and belief in the war that he once enthusiastically supported, but that he will continue on with his duties as a soldier. James gives Hazel an account of the war that he has written that he wants published if he is killed. Meanwhile, James speaks to Rose, puts on a strong British soldier personality, and tells Rose how proud she should be of Gregory and herself and that they are heroes of history. Later, when James opens a drawer he sees a photo of Jack Dyson and letters from Jack to Hazel, but closes the drawer and says nothing.

== Cast ==
- Angela Baddeley - Mrs Bridges
- Gordon Jackson - Hudson
- Jean Marsh - Rose
- Meg Wynn Owen - Hazel Bellamy
- Simon Williams - James Bellamy
- Jacqueline Tong - Daisy
- Eileen Way - Madame Francini
- Helena McCarthy - Mrs Speedwell
- Graham Leaman - Mr Price

== Reception ==
In The Evening News, Richard Afton wrote that the programme was "running downhill fast". He said that "The Glorious Dead", "with its sordid intrigues, mumbo-jumbo sense and long, philosophical speeches was a bore".
