= If You Were the Only Girl in the World =

- Upstairs, Downstairs episode
- Episode no.: Season 4 Episode 7
- Directed by: Raymond Menmuir
- Written by: John Hawkesworth
- Production code: 6
- Original air date: 26 October 1974

Episode chronology
| ← Previous "Home Fires" | Next → "The Glorious Dead" |

"If You Were The Only Girl in the World" is the seventh episode of the fourth series of the period drama Upstairs, Downstairs. It first aired on 26 October 1974 on ITV.

== Background ==
If You Were The Only Girl in the World was filmed in the studio on 3 and 18 June 1974, with the location footage being filmed on 12 and 13 June 1974. The rowing scenes were filmed at Frensham Ponds in Surrey and the French château scenes were filmed at Waddesdon Manor in Buckinghamshire. The episode was set in the summer of 1916.

== Plot ==
The tea party that was arranged by Hazel and Lady Prudence in Home Fires takes place in the Morning Room of 165, Eaton Place, and only three officers are there, along with Lady Berkhamstead and Mrs Vowles. Hazel befriends Jack Dyson, a shy, young airman who like her has risen from the lower middle class. Lt. Jack Dyson MC and Hazel Bellamy soon start seeing each other. They go boating, see a show and go dancing, where they kiss passionately. The day before he returns to the Front, Dyson goes to Eaton Place to say goodbye, but Hazel is at the canteen. Jack writes her a note, calling her his "only girl in the world".

Meanwhile, Georgina is now a nurse in France, along with her friend Angela Barclay and Jenny. James is now a Major, and when he arrives at Georgina's hospital, they spend the day together. When they separate at the end of the day, they kiss.

== Cast ==
- Gordon Jackson - Hudson
- Jean Marsh - Rose
- Meg Wynn Owen - Hazel Bellamy
- Joan Benham - Lady Prudence Fairfax
- Joyce Heron - Lady Berkhamstead
- Lesley-Anne Down - Georgina Worsley
- Simon Williams - James Bellamy
- Jacqueline Tong - Daisy
- Mel Churcher - Angela Barclay
- Celia Imrie - Jenny
- Patricia MacRae - Sister Menzies
- Neville Hughes - Lt. Cmdr. Rupert Machin
- Richard Ownes - Lt. Bowman
- Venetia Maxwell - Mrs Vowles
- Sarah Twist - Lucy
- Brian Nolan - Man
- Kenneth MacDonald - Soldier
- William Ashley - Patron
- Andrew Ray - Lt. Jack Dyson RFC
