= On with the Dance =

On with the Dance may refer to:

- On with the Dance (Upstairs, Downstairs), an episode of the British TV series Upstairs, Downstairs
- On with the Dance (film), a 1920 American silent costume drama
- On with the Dance (musical), a 1925 musical revue
