= Elma Soiron =

English actress

- Soiron playing Madame Huguot
- Born: 8 June 1918; Acomb, Yorkshire, England
- Died: 2 May 2016 (aged 97); London, England
- Occupation: Actress
- Years active: 1964–2016

Elma Soiron (8 June 1918 in Acomb, Yorkshire – May 2016 in London) was an English actress, who was best known for playing Madame Dubois in "The Path of Duty", the fourth episode of the first series of the British television series, Upstairs, Downstairs (31 October 1971), and Madame Huguot in "A Patriotic Offering", the first episode of the fourth series, first broadcast on 14 September 1974 on ITV. She also appeared in the soap opera Crossroads (1964).

Other parts include an old French woman in the eleventh episode of the first series of the British television series, The Tripods (24 November 1984).
