= Cyril Cross =

English actor

- Cyril Cross playing Monsieur Chargon
- Born: Cyril Cross
- Occupation: Actor
- Years active: 1964–2003
- Notable work: The Benny Hill Show, Doctor Dolittle, Work Is a Four-Letter Word, The Bill, Holby City

Cyril Cross was an English actor, who is best known for playing Monsieur Chargon in A Patriotic Offering of the first episode of the fourth series of the period drama Upstairs, Downstairs. It first aired on 14 September 1974 on ITV.

He is also known for his film appearances in The Mini-Affair (1967), Work Is a Four-Letter Word (1968), Dulcima (1971), Doomwatch (1972), Operation Daybreak (1975) and The Orchard End Murder (1980).

He was also shot down in a Lancaster Bomber over Berlin, in 1943.
