= Joyce Heron =

British actress (1916–1980)

- in She Shall Have Murder (1950)
- Born: Elizabeth Joyce Heron; 6 November 1916; Port Said, Egypt
- Died: 1 April 1980 (aged 63); London, England
- Years active: 1938–1977
- Spouse: Ralph Michael (m. 1947)

Elizabeth Joyce Heron (6 November 1916 – 1 April 1980) was a British stage, film and television actress. She was a West End stage star from 1937, and was married to the actor Ralph Michael.

== Filmography ==
- Premiere (1938) - Dancer
- Women Aren't Angels (1943) - Karen
- Twilight Hour (1945) - Diana
- Don Chicago (1945) - Kitty Mannering
- The Agitator (1945) - Helen Montrose
- The Body Said No! (1950) - Journalist
- She Shall Have Murder (1950) - Rosemary Proctor
- The Weak and the Wicked (1954) - Prison Matron Arnold
- Three Cornered Fate (1955) - Edna Hastings
- Beyond This Place (1959) - Lady Catherine Sprott
- A Family at War (1971, TV Series) - Mrs MacKenzie / Mrs. Mackenzie
- Au Pair Girls (1972) - Mrs. Stevenson
- Upstairs, Downstairs (1974, Episodes: "A Patriotic Offering" and "If You Were the Only Girl in the World") - Lady Berkhamstead
- Play for Today: Rumpole and the Confession of Guilt (1975, TV Series) - Hilda Rumpole
- Emmerdale Farm (1975, TV Series) - Madge Plunkett

== Selected stage credits ==
- She Follows Me About by Ben Travers (1943)
- The Shop at Sly Corner by Edward Percy Smith (1945)
- Dead Secret by Michael Clayton Hutton (1952)
