= Fanny Rowe =

English actress (1913–1988)

- Photo by Francis Goodman, 1949 © National Portrait Gallery, London
- Born: Frances Mabel Rowe; 26 June 1913; Preston, Lancashire, England
- Died: 31 July 1988 (aged 75); London, England
- Education: Newnham College, Cambridge
- Occupation: Actress
- Years active: 1936–1988
- Spouse: Clive Morton (m. 1954; died 1975)

Frances Mabel Morton (née Rowe, 26 June 1913 – 31 July 1988) was an English stage, film and television actress.

== Early years ==
Rowe was born in Preston, Lancashire, the daughter of a parson, and educated at Channing School For Girls in Highgate and then went on to study at Newnham College, Cambridge.

== Stage ==
Rowe's acting career started in the Marlowe Society, Cambridge. She then worked on the West End and in repertory theatre from 1936 onward, at Newcastle, Coventry, Harrogate, Worthing, Dundee and Windsor.

She appeared in many theatrical productions both on the West End and also in the United States. Her American stage debut was in Man and Superman. In 1951 she was awarded the Clarence Derwent Award (her real name Frances Rowe is listed). She played the part of Alex Cornwall in Who Goes There!. In 1952 she was in John Clements' comedy The Happy Marriage. In 1955 she starred in the J.B. Priestley play Mr. Kettle and Mrs. Moon.

== Radio ==
Rowe made her American radio debut on Grand Central Station.

== Television ==
Rowe's television work included Love Story, Rogues' Gallery, Vanity Fair, The Mill on the Floss (1965 TV adaptation of the book) and as Emily Forsyte in the 1967 BBC TV serial drama The Forsyte Saga. In later years, she appeared in The Ghosts of Motley Hall, and her most famous roles were that of Nancy Penrose, the mother of Hester played by Julia McKenzie in the ITV sitcom Fresh Fields, (1984–86) and Vera Polling in After Henry (1988). She was also in the Tales of the Unexpected episode What Have You Been up to Lately?. (series 5-episode 13) She appeared in an episode of Upstairs, Downstairs, "The Hero's Farewell", as the Duchess of Mitcham, and she made a guest appearance in the final episode of Rising Damp, playing Miss Jones's mother.

== Personal life ==
Rowe married actor Clive Morton in 1954. She died in London on 31 July 1988 at the age of 75.

== Filmography ==
Year	Title	Role	Notes
1944	They Came to a City	Philippa	
1952	Never Look Back	Liz	
1952	Miss Robin Hood	Marion	
1953	Street Corner	C.O.	Uncredited
1954	The Teckman Mystery	Eileen Miller	
1954	Aunt Clara	Maggie Mason	Uncredited
1955	The Dark Avenger	Genevieve	
1957	The Birthday Present	Secretary	
1958	The Moonraker	Lady Dorset	
1970	Jane Eyre	Mrs. Eshton	TV movie
1972	Lady Caroline Lamb	Lady Holland	

== Radio appearances ==
Year	Program	Episode/source
1948	Grand Central Station	NA
