= Derek Bennett (director) =

British television director (1930–2005)

Derek James Bennett (5 November 1930 – 26 June 2005) was a British television producer and director best known for directing the first episode of long running British soap opera Coronation Street.

== Early life ==
Derek James Bennett was born on 5 November 1930 in Birmingham.

== Career ==
In 1960, Bennett began working for Granada Television, directing programmes Skysport, Biggles and Knight Errant Limited.

In December 1960, Bennett produced the first episode of British soap opera Coronation Street. He worked closely with creator Tony Warren and producer Stuart Latham in casting the serial and directed a total of 25 episodes between 1960 and 1962.

Bennett is known for directing programmes such as The Odd Man, Bootsie and Snudge and It's Dark Outside. He also directed 7 episodes of Play of the Week and various episodes of Sunday Night Theatre, Sunday Night Drama and Playhouse. During the 1970s, he directed numerous episodes of Upstairs, Downstairs and Beryl's Lot. Between 1990 and 1992, he directed the soap opera Emmerdale. Bennett often produced the programmes he directed.

In the 2010 drama The Road to Coronation Street Bennett was portrayed by Shaun Dooley.

== Personal life and death ==
Bennett married Hazel Josephine Bryant in 1987 in Stafford. He retired in 1990.

Bennett died in 2005, aged 74, at his home in Shrewsbury, Shropshire. He had been suffering with cancer. Bennett did not have a funeral, at his own request.
