= Christopher Hodson (director) =

British film director (1929–2015)

- Born: Christopher Stacey Hodson; 12 January 1929; Hawarden, Flintshire, Wales
- Died: 26 December 2015 (aged 86); Chichester, West Sussex, England
- Occupations: TV and film director
- Years active: 1958–2000

Christopher Hodson (12 January 1929 – 26 December 2015) was a British television director.

== Career ==
Christopher Hodson (also credited as Chris Hodson) was a director of British TV series and TV movies from 1958 to 2000. He directed episodes of series including Upstairs, Downstairs, The Main Chance, The Bill and EastEnders.

He directed one feature film, The Best Pair of Legs in the Business (1973) with Reg Varney in a tragicomedic role, based on the ITV Playhouse play of the same name he directed in 1968.

== Director credits (television) ==
- 1958–1959: Educating Archie (21 episodes)
- 1958–1967: ITV Play of the Week (4 episodes)
- 1959–1967: No Hiding Place (24 episodes)
- 1959: Find the Singer (7 episodes)
- 1959: ITV Television Playhouse, "The Advocate"
- 1960–1962: Somerset Maugham Hour (4 episodes)
- 1960: Hotel Imperial (6 episodes)
- 1961–1962: Here and Now (7 episodes)
- 1961: Home Tonight (20 episodes)
- 1961: Three Live Wires (17 episodes)
- 1962: Top Secret (3 episodes)
- 1963–1964: Our Man at St. Mark's (5 episodes)
- 1963–1965: Crane (20 episodes)
- 1965: Riviera Police (3 episodes)
- 1966: Seven Deadly Sins (2 episodes)
- 1967: Mr. Aitch, "The Great Pretender"
- 1967: Seven Deadly Virtues, "It's Your Move"
- 1967: The Informer (3 episodes)
- 1968–1969: The Root of All Evil? (3 episodes)
- 1968–1975: Firing Line (3 episodes)
- 1968: ITV Playhouse, "Lucky for Some", "Daddy Kiss It Better", "The Best Pair of Legs in the Business"
- 1968: Sanctuary (2 episodes)
- 1968: The Gamblers (1 episode)
- 1968: Gazette (1 episode)
- 1969–1970: The Main Chance (9 episodes)
- 1969: Mr. Digby Darling (1 episode), also series Producer
- 1969: ITV Sunday Night Theatre (1 episode)
- 1970–1973: Menace (3 episodes)
- 1971–1972: Justice (6 episodes)
- 1971: The Ten Commandments (1 episode)
- 1972–1975: Upstairs, Downstairs (14 episodes)
- 1972: New Scotland Yard (1 episode)
- 1972: The Organization (3 episodes)
- 1972: ITV Playhouse, "Jo" (1972)
- 1973: Helen: A Woman of Today (2 episodes)
- 1974–1978: Within These Walls (11 episodes)
- 1974: Seven Faces of Woman (1 episode)
- 1974: Good Girl (2 episodes)
- 1975–1977: Raffles (7 episodes)
- 1975: Raffles (TV movie)
- 1976: Hadleigh (2 episodes)
- 1976: Murder (2 episodes)
- 1977: Love for Lydia (2 episodes)
- 1978: The Prime of Miss Jean Brodie
- 1978: Enemy at the Door (4 episodes)
- 1978: Lillie (TV Mini Series) (4 episodes)
- 1979: Thomas and Sarah (4 episodes), also Producer (13 episodes)
- 1979: Two People (1 episode)
- 1980–1982: The Gentle Touch (4 episodes)
- 1980: The Marquise (TV Movie)
- 1981: Sunday Night Thriller (2 episodes)
- 1982: We'll Meet Again (TV Mini Series) (4 episodes)
- 1982: ITV Playhouse, "The Houseboy"
- 1982: The Agatha Christie Hour (1 episode)
- 1982: Saturday Night Thriller (2 episodes)
- 1983: Jemima Shore Investigates (1 episode)
- 1983: Storyboard (2 episodes)
- 1983: The All Electric Amusement Arcade (2 episodes)
- 1983–1984: Agatha Christie's Partners in Crime (5 episodes)
- 1984: Chocky (3 episodes)
- 1984–1985: Mr. Palfrey of Westminster (4 episodes)
- 1984–2000: The Bill (40 episodes)
- 1987: A Dorothy L. Sayers Mystery (7 episodes)
- 1989: Chelworth (2 episodes)
- 1990: Campion (2 episodes)
- 1990: EastEnders (4 episodes)
- 1991: Specials (7 episodes)
- 1992: The Mixer (2 episodes)
- 1993: Growing Pains (2 episodes)

== Director credits (film) ==
- 1972: The Telephone at Work (short)
- 1972: Letter Writing at Work (short)
- 1973: The Best Pair of Legs in the Business

== Awards ==
In 1976 Hodson was nominated for a Primetime Emmy for "Outstanding Directing in a Drama Series" for the Upstairs, Downstairs episode "Women Shall Not Weep" (1974), shown in the PBS Masterpiece drama anthology series.
