= Jeremy Paul (screenwriter) =

British film and television writer (1939–2011)

- Born: Jeremy Paul Roche; 29 July 1939; Bexhill-on-Sea, Sussex, England
- Died: 3 May 2011 (aged 71); England
- Occupations: Film and television screenwriter
- Spouse: Patricia
- Children: 4 daughters
- Parent: Joan Haythorne

Jeremy Paul (29 July 1939 – 3 May 2011) was a British film and television writer.

== Early life, family and education ==
Jeremy Paul Roche was born on 29 July 1939 in Bexhill, East Sussex, the son of the actress Joan Haythorne.

== Career ==
Alan Gibson came up with the idea for The Flipside of Dominick Hide (1980), a Play for Today he co-wrote with Jeremy Paul and directed. They collaborated again on its sequel, Another Flip for Dominick (1982).

Additionally, Paul co-wrote the song Mistletoe and Wine, which was a Christmas No. 1 hit for Cliff Richard in 1988.

== Selected film (as writer) ==
- Countess Dracula (1971)

== Selected television (as writer) ==
- Out of the Unknown (1969)
- Shadows of Fear (1970)
- Upstairs, Downstairs (1971–1975)
- The Duchess of Duke Street (1976–1977)
- The Flipside of Dominick Hide (1980)
- Another Flip for Dominick (1982)
- Sherlock Holmes (1984–1994)
- Campion (1989–1990)
