= Hazel Bellamy =

- Hazel Bellamy in "The Sudden Storm"
- First appearance: "Miss Forrest" (1973)
- Last appearance: "Peace Out of Pain" (1974)
- Created by: Upstairs, Downstairs
- Portrayed by: Meg Wynn Owen

In-universe information
- Gender: female
- Occupation: secretary
- Family: Arthur Forrest (father); Mrs Forrest (mother)
- Spouses: Patrick O'Connor (divorced); James Bellamy
- Nationality: British

Hazel Patricia Bellamy (née Forrest; circa 1883–1918) is a fictional character in the British television series, Upstairs, Downstairs. She was portrayed by Meg Wynn Owen.

In the spring of 1912, Richard Bellamy hires Hazel Forrest as a typist for a biography of his late father-in-law, the Earl of Southwold. She is a middle-class young woman who has been earning a living as a secretary for ten years, despite her parents' wishes. This character gives the viewer a rare view of the interior of her parents' middle class home, one of the few locations other than the Bellamys' home. James is immediately attracted to her.

The class divide between James and Hazel causes early conflicts with Hazel's parents, the Bellamys' staff and in the marriage. After about seven months of courting, James proposes in November, but Hazel tearfully refuses him. She does not tell him that she was married before to a violent alcoholic named Patrick O'Connor. Hazel's sad past is now the Forrest's family secret. This leads Hazel's father, Arthur Forrest, to visit James and reveal the family secret. He explains that Hazel was previously married to a drunkard, Patrick O'Connor, who beat her. They divorced and Hazel moved back in with her parents. Mr. Forrest wants his daughter to be happy, while the prickly Mrs. Forrest is sure the Bellamys would never accept Hazel as a divorced woman (there being such a stigma against divorce in 1912). James asks Hazel again, and after talking, during which he informs Hazel that his own sister Elizabeth divorced and remarried, she accepts his second proposal. They marry in late 1912 or early 1913, and honeymoon in Paris.

James and Hazel Bellamy are going for a weekend hunting party to Somerby Park in 1913, the country house of James' school-friend Lord "Bunny" Newbury. The other guests encourage her to surprise James and join the hunt, something she has never done before. Diana Newberry, a childhood friend and love interest of James Bellamy, is jealous and contemptuous of James' middle class wife. Diana secretly switches the horses and gives Hazel a spirited mount. The horse bolts and runs away with Hazel. She is nearly killed. She and James then argue, as he feels humiliated. This, in addition to Major Cochrane-Danby claiming that James and Diana are sleeping together, leads Hazel to flee Somerby with Rose. James follows her back to London and they soon make up.

The tea party that was arranged by Hazel and Lady Prudence in Home Fires takes place in the Morning Room of 165 Eaton Place, and only three officers are there, along with Lady Berkhamstead and Mrs Vowles.

Hazel befriends a shy, young airman called Jack Dyson, who, like her, has risen from the middle class. They soon start going out with each other. They go boating, see a show and go dancing, where they kiss passionately. The day before he goes back to the Front, Dyson goes to Eaton Place to say goodbye, but Hazel is out at the canteen. He then writes her a note, calling her his "only girl in the World".

In the episode The Glorious Dead Rose gets a letter from Captain Peter Graham, Gregory's company commander telling her that her fiancé has been killed. Hazel comforts Rose and tells her that she knows what she is feeling, because she read in the newspaper that Lt. Jack Dyson MC had been killed in an aerial battle: "One grief-stricken woman urges another to be strong and to seek comfort in prayer. Ultimately, Hazel tells Rose – and herself – that time will help accommodate bereavement and loss."

James Bellamy comes home on leave. When he opens a drawer he sees the letters from Jack Dyson and photo of him, but he closes the drawer and says nothing.

It is November 1918 and James and Hazel argue. It is implied that James strikes her, and Hazel runs out crying. When Rose comforts her on the stairs, she realises that Hazel has a temperature. Dr Foley arrives, examines her and tells Hazel that she has caught the Spanish flu that is currently a pandemic. She and James make up, but on 9 November 1918 Hazel dies at Eaton Place. Rose is greatly upset by her death. The funeral is held on 11 November, the day the war ends, at St Mark's Church in Wimbledon. Hazel's parents go also to the funeral. Her mother is cold, but her father Arthur Forrest weeps.

== See also ==
- List of Upstairs, Downstairs (1971 TV series) characters
