= Jean Marsh =

English actress (1934–2025)

Jean Marsh OBE
- Marsh in The Waltons, 1977
- Born: Jean Lyndsey Torren Marsh; 1 July 1934; Stoke Newington, London, England
- Died: 13 April 2025 (aged 90); London, England
- Resting place: Brompton Cemetery, London, England
- Occupations: Actress; writer
- Years active: 1953–2014
- Spouse: Jon Pertwee (m. 1955; div. 1960)

Jean Lyndsey Torren Marsh (1 July 1934 – 13 April 2025) was an English actress and writer. She co-created and starred in the ITV series Upstairs, Downstairs (1971–1975), for which she won the 1975 Emmy Award for Outstanding Lead Actress in a Drama Series for her performance as Rose Buck. She reprised the role in the BBC's revival of the series (2010–2012).

Marsh co-created the television series The House of Eliott in 1991. Her film appearances include Cleopatra (1963), Frenzy (1972), The Eagle Has Landed (1976), The Changeling (1980), Return to Oz (1985), Willow (1988), Fatherland (1994) and Monarch (2000). She is also known for three roles in Doctor Who: as Joan of England in The Crusade; Sara Kingdom, a companion of the First Doctor; and a villain opposite the Seventh Doctor. From 1955 to 1960 she was married to Jon Pertwee, who played the Third Doctor in the series.

== Early life ==
Marsh was born on 1 July 1934, and grew up in Stoke Newington, London, one of two daughters born to Henry and Emmeline (née Bexley) Marsh. She studied ballet, singing, and acting from an early age.

== Career ==
During the 1950s and 1960s, Marsh made many appearances on British and American television, including an episode of The Twilight Zone called "The Lonely" (1959), in which she portrayed a lifelike gynoid; The Moon and Sixpence (1959), opposite Laurence Olivier and Denholm Elliott; The Wonderful World of Disney (1961); an episode of the series Danger Man (1961), entitled "Name, Date and Place" as Kim Russell, Gideon's Way (1965); I Spy (1967); in four episodes of The Saint (1964–1968); and one episode of UFO ("Exposed" 1970, as Janna). She was also a regular alongside Ian Hendry in the ITV series The Informer (1966–67).

Marsh appeared several times in the BBC series Doctor Who. She first appeared alongside William Hartnell in the 1965 serial The Crusade as Lady Joanna, the sister of Richard I (The Lionheart). She returned later that year as companion Sara Kingdom in 9 episodes of the 12-part serial The Daleks' Master Plan. Marsh reprised the role in the audio plays Home Truths (2008), The Drowned World (2009), The Guardian of the Solar System (2010), The Five Companions (2011), The Anachronauts (2012), The Light At The End (2013), An Ordinary Life (2014) and The Sontarans (2016). She also appeared in the 1989 television serial Battlefield as Morgaine, as well as the 2007 audio play The Wishing Beast. She made an un-billed cameo appearance in the 2013 docudrama about Doctor Who, An Adventure in Space and Time.

Marsh featured as Bertha Mason Rochester in the George C. Scott-Susannah York version of Jane Eyre, directed by Delbert Mann. The film was released theatrically in the United Kingdom in 1970 and shown in the United States on NBC television in 1971.

Marsh's 2000 (re-released in cinemas in 2014) film about the death of Henry VIII, Monarch.

With Eileen Atkins, Marsh created the British period television drama Upstairs, Downstairs, and played the role of the house parlourmaid Rose Buck for the duration of the series, from 1971 until 1975. The programme was screened internationally and received numerous awards including two BAFTA Awards, two Royal Television Society awards, eight Emmys and a Golden Globe. Marsh received a Royal Television Society award in 1971 and an Emmy Award for Outstanding Lead Actress for her role in 1975, and was nominated for the same award on three more occasions – 1974, 1976, and (for the show's revival) in 2011. She also received awards from the American Drama Centre and American Drama Critics Circle for the role as well as two Golden Globe Award nominations.

She and Atkins created The House of Eliott, another television series broadcast between 1991 and 1994. This time, Marsh did not act in the series, but she did write some of the episodes.

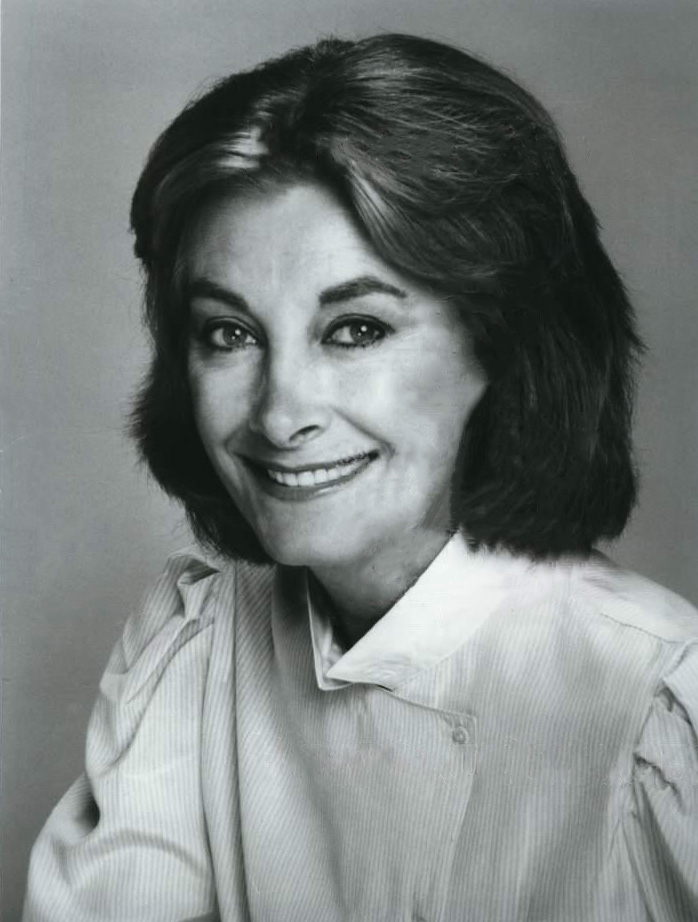
Marsh in a publicity photo for 9 to 5 in 1982

Marsh's film credits include the Tony Hancock film The Rebel (1961), Cleopatra (1963) as Octavia, Unearthly Stranger (1964), Charlie Bubbles (1967), The Limbo Line (1968), Alfred Hitchcock's Frenzy (1972), Dark Places (1973), The Eagle Has Landed (1976), The Changeling (1980) and the fantasy films Return to Oz (1985) and Willow (1988). In 1994, she starred in a villain role in the Nickelodeon/Thames Television remake of The Tomorrow People. Her television films include Goliath Awaits (1981), See China and Die (1981), Master of the Game (1984), The Corsican Brothers (1985), A Connecticut Yankee in King Arthur's Court (1989), Fatherland (1994) for which she won a CableACE award for supporting actress, and The Pale Horse (1997). From 1982 to 1983, she portrayed the part of Roz Keith in the American sitcom 9 to 5.

Marsh served as the presenter for International Animation Festival, an American public television series featuring award-winning animated short films from around the world. The 26-episode series was broadcast in 1975 on PBS.

From 2000 until 2002, Marsh played the title in the CBBC series The Ghost Hunter.

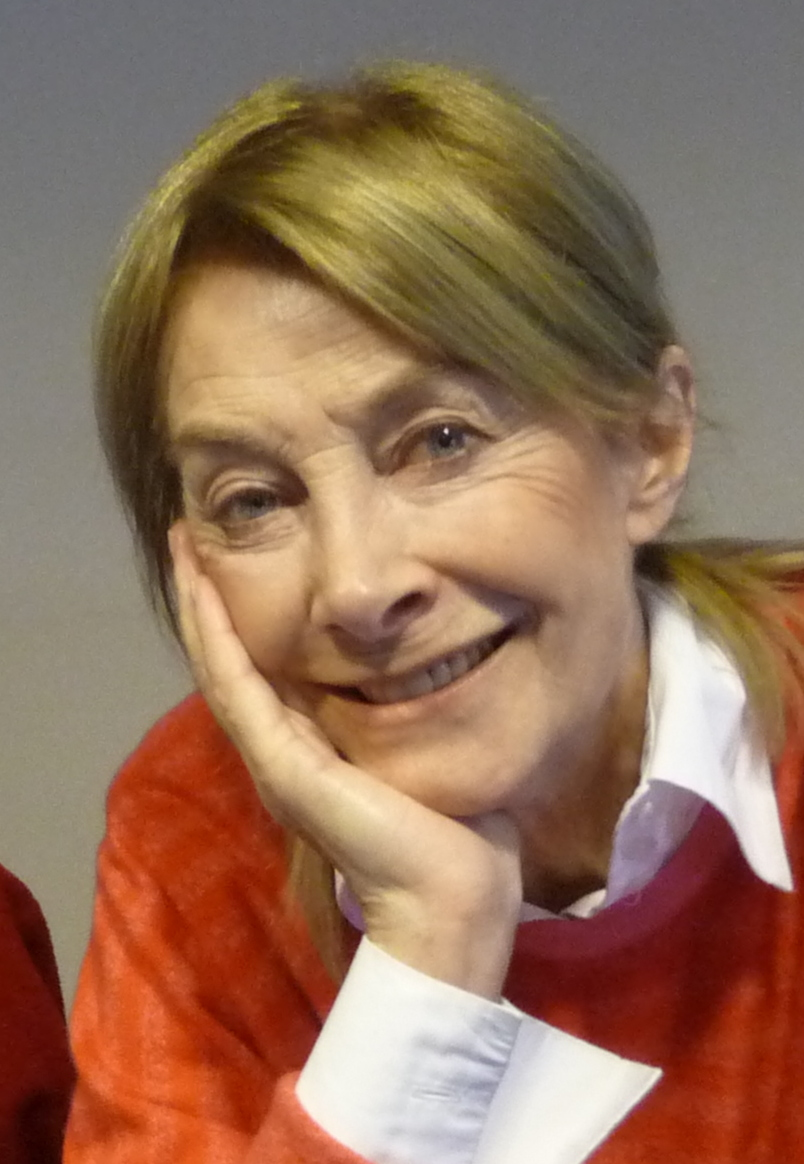
Marsh in 2009

Her many stage credits included the West End stage revival of Boeing Boeing at the Comedy Theatre in 2007 and in Peter Hall's production of The Portrait of a Lady in 2008. She made an appearance in the 2008 BBC adaptation of Jane Austen's Sense and Sensibility; played the recurring character Lizzie Galbraith alongside Joanna Lumley as Davina Jackson (the lead character) in Babycow Productions' Sensitive Skin, which aired on BBC Two in 2005 and 2007. She appeared in December 2008 in a role written for her by Mark Gatiss, in BBC Four's Crooked House.

A three-part revival of Upstairs, Downstairs was commissioned by the BBC with the first episode broadcast on BBC One on 26 December 2010. Marsh reprised her role as Rose Buck, who had returned to London to run an agency for domestic servants after a period spent nursing her mother in Suffolk. Eileen Atkins, who co-created the original series with Marsh, also starred in the revived series. It was set in the same fictional London address as the original ITV series, 165 Eaton Place, resuming in 1936. Subsequently, a six-part second series was commissioned, and began transmission in February 2012 with Marsh's character appearing less frequently due to the stroke suffered by the actress.

Marsh wrote several books: Fiennders Abbey, The House of Eliott, and Iris.

== Personal life and death ==
Marsh met actor Jon Pertwee (1919–1996) while working on the film Will Any Gentleman...? They married on 2 April 1955, though the marriage quickly broke down. They formally divorced in August 1960. Marsh did not remarry or have any children but had relationships with Albert Finney, Kenneth Haigh, and director Michael Lindsay-Hogg.

On 3 October 2011, the BBC announced that Marsh had suffered a minor stroke and would miss the beginning of the second series of the revived Upstairs, Downstairs. She was ultimately only able to appear in two short scenes.

Marsh died from complications from dementia at her London home, on 13 April 2025, at the age of 90.

== Honours ==
Marsh was appointed Officer of the Order of the British Empire (OBE) in the 2012 Birthday Honours for services to drama.

== Filmography ==
=== Film ===
Year	Title	Role	Notes
1947	The Life and Adventures of Nicholas Nickleby	Sewing Girl	Uncredited
1953	Will Any Gentleman...?	Dancer	Uncredited
1953	The Limping Man	The Landlady's Daughter	
1954	The Love Lottery	Dancer in Sally's Dream	Uncredited
1961	Call Me Genius	Strange Woman at Party	Uncredited
1961	The Roman Spring of Mrs. Stone	Party Guest	Uncredited
1963	Cleopatra	Octavia	Uncredited
1963	Unearthly Stranger	Miss Ballard	
1964	Face of a Stranger	Grace	
1967	Charlie Bubbles	Waitress	Uncredited
1968	The Limbo Line	Dilys	
1970	Jane Eyre	Bertha Rochester	
1972	Frenzy	Monica Barling	
1974	Dark Places	Victoria	
1976	The Eagle Has Landed	Joanna Grey	
1980	The Changeling	Joanna Russell	
1985	Return to Oz	Nurse Wilson/Mombi	
1988	Willow	Queen Bavmorda	
2000	Monarch	The Queens	
2009	The Heavy	Mrs. Mason	

== Television ==
Year	Title	Role	Notes
1952	The Infinite Shoeblack		Televised play on the BBC
1956	ITV Television Playhouse	Christine	Episode: "Woman in a Dressing Gown"
1958	Omnibus	Mimi in La bohème	Episode: "What Makes Opera Grand?"
1959	The Third Man	Helene	Episode: "The Angry Young Man"
1959	The Moon and Sixpence	Ata	TV film
1959	The Twilight Zone	Alicia	Episode: "The Lonely"
1961	Danger Man	Kim Russell	Episode: "Name, Date, Place"
1961	The Magical World of Disney	Andrienne	Episode: The Horsemasters
1962	Heart to Heart (The Largest Theatre in the World)	Peggy Mann	TV play
1963–64	ITV Play of the Week	Dorothy Lemonade/Margo Robertson	2 episodes
1964	The Edgar Wallace Mystery Theater	Grace	Episode: "Face of a Stranger"
1964–68	The Saint	Various	4 episodes
1965	Doctor Who	Joanna	Serial: The Crusade
1965	ITV Sunday Night Drama	Sheila	Episode: "Suspense Hour: Curtains for Sheila"
1965–66	Gideon C.I.D.	Elspeth McCrae/Sandra Casey	2 episodes
1965–66	Doctor Who	Sara Kingdom	Serial: The Daleks' Master Plan
1966–67	The Informer	Sylvia Parish	17 episodes
1967	I Spy	Katherine Faulkner	Episode: "The War Lord"
1967	Adam Adamant Lives!	Lady Lydia	Episode: "Face in a Mirror"
1968	Detective	Julie Oliver	Episode: "The Deadly Climate"
1968	The Wednesday Play	Edna	Episode: "A Bit of Crucixion, Father"
1968	Thirty-Minute Theatre	Alex	Episode: "Cross Examine"
1969	The Expert	Sybil Houghton	Episode: "The Yellow Torrish"
1969	Department S	Agatha Pollen	Episode: "The Perfect Operation"
1969	The Root of All Evil?	Anabel	Episode: "What's in It For Me?"
1970	UFO	Janna	Episode: "Exposed"
1970–72	ITV Saturday Night Theatre	Mrs. Philpott/Jenny	2 episodes
1971	The Persuaders!	Nicola	Episode: "Five Miles to Midnight"
1971	Play for Today	Madeline Walsh	Episode: "Skin Deep"
1971–75	Upstairs, Downstairs	Rose Buck	54 episodes, also co-creator
1972	The Befrienders	Miranda Rawling	Episode: "Nobody Understands Miranda"
1973	The Rivals of Sherlock Holmes	Mrs. Vanrenen	Episode: "The Looting of the Specie Room"
1976	Camera Three		Episode: "Mad About the Boy: A Noel Coward Celebration"
1977	The Waltons	Hilary Von Kleist	Episode: "The Hiding Place"
1978	Hawaii Five-O	Sister Harmony	Episode: "The Miracle Man"
1981	See China and Die	Sally Hackman	TV film
1981	Trapper John, M.D.	Claire Browning	Episode: "Earthquake"
1981	Goliath Awaits	Dr. Goldman	Miniseries; 2 episodes
1982–83	9 to 5	Roz Keith	Series regular
1983	The Love Boat	Ceilia Hoffman	Episode: "Japan Cruise"
1984	Master of the Game	Mrs. Talley	Miniseries; 1 episode
1985	The Corsican Brothers	Mazzere	TV film
1985	Tales from the Darkside	Joan Matlin	Episode: "Answer Me"
1989	Danny, the Champion of the World	Miss Hunter	TV film
1989	Act of Will	Eliza Crowther	Miniseries; 1 episode
1989	Doctor Who	Morgaine	Serial: Battlefield
1991–94	The House of Eliott		Co-creator
1992	Screen One	Lisbeth Bede	Episode: "Adam Bede"
1993	Murder, She Wrote	Glenda Highsmith	Episode: "Murder in White"
1994	The Tomorrow People	Dr. Culex	Serial: "The Culex Experiment"
1994	The All New Alexei Sayle Show	Matron in Psycho Ward 11	6 episodes
1994	Fatherland	Anna Von Hogen	TV film
1996	The Ring		TV film
1997	Dangerfield	Mrs. Matthews	Episode: "Guilt"
1999	Kavanagh QC	Lady Tibbit	Episode: "End Game"
2000–02	The Ghost Hunter	Mrs. Croker	18 episodes
2002	Holby City	Vera Engells	Episode: "Pills and Frills"
2003	The Mayor of Casterbridge	Furmity Woman	TV film
2003	Doctors	Liz	Episode: "Today's the Day"
2005	Julian Fellowes Investigates: A Most Mysterious Murder	Violet Sidney	Episode: "The Case of the Croydon Poisonings"
2007	Sensitive Skin	Lizzie Galbraith	Miniseries
2008	Sense and Sensibility	Mrs. Ferrars	Miniseries; 1 episode
2008	Crooked House	Lady Constance de Momery	2 episodes
2010–12	Upstairs Downstairs	Mrs. Rose Buck	5 episodes
2013	An Adventure in Space and Time	Party Guest	Uncredited
2014	Grantchester	Daisy Livingstone	1 episode
2022	Willow	Queen Bavmorda	Episode: "The Whispers of Nockmaar", via archive footage

== Radio ==
Just a Minute – Series 7 and 8, 1973

== Theatre ==
Year	Title	Role	Notes
1959	Much Ado About Nothing	Hero	A Broadway production starring John Gielgud
1961	The Bird of Time	Shirley O'Neill	Royal Court Theatre, Liverpool and Savoy Theatre
1979	Whose Life Is It Anyway?	Dr. Scott	Trafalgar Theatre
1987	Let Us Go Then You and I	Narrator	Lyric Theatre
1992	The Chalk Garden	Miss Madrigal	King's Head Theatre
2006	The Old Country	Bron	Trafalgar Studios 1, Yvonne Arnaud Theatre and other locations
2007–2008	Boeing Boeing	Bertha	Comedy Theatre
2008	The Portrait of a Lady	Mrs. Touchett	Theatre Royal, Bath and Rose Theatre

== Books ==
- Jean Marsh, The House of Eliott, Sidgwick & Jackson (November 1993), 978–0283061554; St. Martin's Press (February 1994), ISBN 978-0-312-10996-7
- Jean Marsh, Fiennders Keepers, Macmillan (1996), ISBN 978-0-333-63211-6; St. Martin's Press (May 1997), ISBN 978-0-312-15528-5
- Jean Marsh, Iris, St Martin's Press (July 2000), ISBN 978-0-312-26182-5; Macmillan (February 2003), ISBN 978-0-333-71154-5
- Jean Marsh, Fiennders Abbey, Pan (5 August 2011), ISBN 978-1-4472-0007-9
