= Jenny Tomasin =

British actress (1938–2012)

- Tomasin as Ruby Finch in Upstairs, Downstairs
- Born: 22 March 1938; Leeds, West Riding of Yorkshire, England
- Died: 3 January 2012 (aged 73); London, England
- Occupation: Actress
- Years active: 1972–2006
- Known for: Role of Ruby Finch in Upstairs, Downstairs (1972–1975)

Jenny Tomasin (22 March 1938 – 3 January 2012) was a British actress, known for her role as kitchen maid Ruby Finch in the LWT period drama series Upstairs, Downstairs, which she played from 1972 to 1975.

== Early life ==
Tomasin was born in Leeds, West Riding of Yorkshire, in 1938 to working class parents. She knew from an early age she wanted to be an actress, although her parents did not support her goal.

== Career ==
Tomasin's first screen role was in 1972 in The Adventures of Barry McKenzie, as the character Sarah Gort. Her first major role came when she was discovered by Upstairs, Downstairs producer John Hawkesworth, who noticed Tomasin's photograph in a casting directory. Soon after, Tomasin joined the cast of Upstairs, Downstairs as Ruby Finch, the kitchen maid to the Bellamy family.

Tomasin appeared in the series from 1972, until it came to an end in 1975. She appeared in 41 episodes. Plans were made for a spin-off series featuring Ruby and fellow Upstairs, Downstairs characters Hudson and Mrs Bridges; however, the series was never made because of the death of actress Angela Baddeley. Although her career on Upstairs, Downstairs had made Tomasin a household name, she also felt that the role left her typecast.

In 1985, Tomasin guest starred in the Doctor Who serial Revelation of the Daleks, the final story before the series went on an 18-month hiatus, as the character Tasambeker. Tomasin also played two roles in the soap opera Emmerdale. In 1981–1982 she played Naomi Tolly, daughter of Enoch Tolly, who was killed in a tractor accident. Her second role was as Noreen Bell, a cantankerous villager who died in July 2006. This would be her last role.

Her other films included roles in Mister Quilp (1975), The Trouble with Spies (1987) and Just Ask for Diamond (1988).

== Death ==
Tomasin died on 3 January 2012, aged 73, from hypertensive heart disease.

== Filmography ==
=== Film ===
Year	Title	Role	Notes
1972	The Adventures of Barry McKenzie	Sarah Gort	
1975	Eskimo Nell	Shy Casting Girl	
1975	Mister Quilp	Mrs Simmons	
1987	The Trouble with Spies	Martha	
1988	Just Ask for Diamond	Traffic Warden	

=== Television ===
Year	Title	Role	Notes
1972–1975	Upstairs, Downstairs	Ruby Finch	
1974–1979	Crossroads	Florence Baker	
1975	The Love School	Jane's Sister	Episode: "Remember Me"
1976	The Dick Emery Show	Actress	Episode: 14.5
1976	Brensham People	Pru	Episode: "William Hart, Wainwright"
1977	The Onedin Line	Mrs Purvis	Episode: "The Hostage"
1977	Midnight Is a Place	Rose Sproggs	4 Episodes
1980–1981	Emmerdale Farm	Naomi Tolly	
1983	Man and Superman	Parlourmaid	Television film
1984	Tripper's Day	Minnie	Episode: "Games People Play"
1985	That's My Boy	Brenda Cross	Episode: "Hello Young Mothers"
1985	Doctor Who	Tasambeker	Episodes: "Revelation of the Daleks: Parts 1 and 2"
1994	Martin Chuzzlewit	Maidservant	2 episodes
2000	Cinderella	Cook	Television film
2005–2006	Emmerdale	Noreen Bell	Recurring role

== Stage ==
Year	Title	Role	Venue	Ref
1978	Hush and Hide		UK National Tour	
1978–1979	See How They Run	Ida	Greenwich Theatre	
1979	Ten Times Table	Philippa	UK National Tour	
1982-1983	Man and Superman	Parlourmaid	Theatre Royal Haymarket	
1988–1989	Blithe Spirit	Edith	UK National Tour	
1991	Lettice and Lovage	Miss Framer	UK National Tour	
2004	The Marquise	Alice	UK National Tour	
