= List of Upstairs, Downstairs (1971 TV series) characters =

This is an alphabetical list of characters from the ITV drama series Upstairs, Downstairs, which aired from 1971 to 1975.

== Cast ==
Key
Regular cast (4 or more episodes)
Recurring cast (2–3 episodes)
Guest cast (1 episode)

Actor	Character	Series				
Actor	Character	1	2	3	4	5
Upstairs
David Langton	Richard Bellamy	Regular	Regular	Regular	Regular	Regular
Rachel Gurney	Lady Marjorie Bellamy	Regular	Regular	Guest		
Simon Williams	James Bellamy	Regular	Recurring	Regular	Regular	Regular
Nicola Pagett	Elizabeth Bellamy	Regular	Regular			
Ian Ogilvy	Lawrence Kirbridge	Recurring	Regular			
Meg Wynn Owen	Hazel Bellamy			Regular	Regular	
Raymond Huntley	Sir Geoffrey Dillon	Guest	Recurring	Regular	Recurring	Recurring
Lesley-Anne Down	Georgina Worsley			Regular	Regular	Regular
Joan Benham	Lady Prudence Fairfax	Recurring	Recurring	Recurring	Regular	Regular
Hannah Gordon	Virginia Bellamy				Recurring	Regular
Anne Yarker	Alice Hamilton					Regular
Downstairs
Pauline Collins	Sarah Moffat	Regular	Regular			
Gordon Jackson	Angus Hudson	Regular	Regular	Regular	Regular	Regular
Angela Baddeley	Kate Bridges	Regular	Regular	Regular	Regular	Regular
Jean Marsh	Rose Buck	Regular	Regular	Regular	Regular	Regular
George Innes	Alfred Harris	Regular		Guest		
Evin Crowley	Emily	Regular				
Patsy Smart	Maud Roberts	Regular	Regular	Recurring		
Christopher Beeny	Edward Barnes	Regular	Regular	Regular	Regular	Regular
Jenny Tomasin	Ruby Finch		Regular	Regular	Regular	Regular
John Alderton	Thomas Watkins		Regular			
Jacqueline Tong	Daisy Barnes			Regular	Regular	Regular
Gareth Hunt	Frederick Norton				Guest	Regular
Karen Dotrice	Lily Hawkins					Regular

== Upstairs ==
=== Bellamy family ===
==== Lady Marjorie Bellamy ====
Portrayed by Rachel Gurney, Lady Marjorie Helen Sybil Bellamy (née Lady Marjorie Helen Sybil Talbot-Carey; 6 May 1860 or 12 July 1864 – 15 April 1912) is married to Richard Bellamy and the mother of James and Elizabeth. In the summer of 1906, she has an affair with a much younger man, Charles Victor Hammond, a captain in the Khyber Rifles and a friend of her son James. Lady Marjorie continues to employ their under-parlour maid Sarah when she becomes pregnant and then miscarries the illegitimate child of James. Blackmail for Lady Marjorie's affair later helps her chauffeur and Sarah in leaving service and purchasing their own business, a garage. Lady Marjorie dies in 1912, a victim of the sinking of the RMS Titanic, while her lady's maid, Miss Roberts, survives.

==== Richard Bellamy ====
Portrayed by David Langton, Richard Pemberton Bellamy, Viscount Bellamy of Haversham (1853–before 1936), (Note: Rose says that the "Bellamys" gave her the silver teapot; she left service before 1936, yet mentions both of them, meaning Richard was dead by 1936 but alive when Rose left.) was the youngest son of the parson of Burnham Trenton in Norfolk, Charles Bellamy, and his wife Hannah. As a young man he won a scholarship to Oxford University, where he excelled. In 1880, he married the wealthy Lady Marjorie Talbot-Carey and became a Conservative MP. They had two children, James and Elizabeth. Richard has an older brother named Arthur (John Nettleton), who bullied Richard as a child. In 1909 Arthur visits Richard, the two have a falling out and they never speak to each other again.

Early in the series he becomes a junior minister (Civil Lord of the Admiralty).

He has a brief, steamy affair with a Vienna-born French Countess de Ternay, which ends on wistfully friendly terms when they both realise neither has the wealth that their public appearances imply.

Widowed by Lady Marjorie's death in 1912, he marries Virginia Hamilton, a war widow, in 1919, having been created Viscount Bellamy of Haversham and a Knight Grand Cross of the Order of St Michael and St George in 1917.

In the 2010 revival of Upstairs, Downstairs, Rose Buck refers to her late master, Lord Richard Bellamy of Haversham, with the implication that Richard had died sometime between 1930 and 1936; Rose later claims that "The Bellamys", meaning Richard and Virginia, gave Rose a teapot for all of her hard work when she left their service sometime between 1930 and 1936.

==== Elizabeth Bellamy ====
Portrayed by Nicola Pagett, Miss Elizabeth Bellamy, later Elizabeth Kirbridge and then The Honourable Elizabeth Wallace after her father's elevation to the peerage (b. 1887), is the daughter of Richard and Lady Marjorie Bellamy and the sister of James. Elizabeth is sent to finishing school in Germany and upon her return to London, finds the upper class life of the Bellamys claustrophobic. Experimenting with socialism and women's liberation without an understanding of the true costs of activism, she marries penniless and sexually ambiguous poet Lawrence Kirbridge. Elizabeth tries to have the marriage annulled, but becomes pregnant by Lawrence Kirbridge's publisher, through a cold-blooded arrangement between Lawrence and the publisher to seduce her. Elizabeth gives birth to a daughter, Lucy Elizabeth, and her father and mother make provision for Lawrence so that the couple can separate. Elizabeth takes up with Julius Karekin, an opportunistic, wealthy businessman who uses her to gain access to her father and his government connections and then gives Elizabeth a hat shop. Elizabeth fails to read her true situation, seeing the gift as loving support of her new-found equality: meanwhile, the businessman uses his new connections to court a Marchioness. Elizabeth moves to New York and marries Dana J. Wallace in about 1911, and never again appears in the series, remaining in America.

==== Georgina Worsley ====
Portrayed by Lesley-Anne Down, Georgina, Marchioness of Stockbridge (née Georgina Worsley, born 28 November 1895) is the step-daughter of Lady Marjorie's brother Hugo, her natural father having died in a hunting accident when she was six years old. Her mother and step-father die along with Lady Marjorie in the sinking of the RMS Titanic in 1912, after which she moves into 165 Eaton Place. She spends the war years serving in France as a VAD Nurse, where her patients include her step-cousin James. During the 1920s, she joins the ranks of young people known as the Bright Young Things – silly, giddy, empty-headed types – but changes her ways after she accidentally runs over and kills a farmworker. She is saved by the testimony of Robert, Marquess of Stockbridge, whom she later marries.

==== James Bellamy ====
Portrayed by Simon Williams, Major The Honourable James Rupert Bellamy MC (1881 – October 1929) is the son of Richard and Lady Marjorie Bellamy and the brother of Elizabeth. He attended the Royal Military Academy at Sandhurst and serves as an officer in the Life Guards of the British Household Cavalry until 1919. He has a series of relationships with women of inferior birth, and fails to launch himself as a responsible adult capable of managing a career, his money and relationships. He is sent off to a military post in India so that he would not be present when his illegitimate child with an underparlour maid is born; the child dies in childbirth. He returned to England with a middle class fiancé, putting pressure on the underparlour maid to find another situation. After losing his fiancé, he leaves the military for a position with an investment firm prior to meeting Hazel Forrest, whom he marries. He rejoins the Army in World War I. Hazel predeceases him in 1918. He commits suicide after losing his fortune in the Wall Street crash of 1929.

==== Hazel Bellamy ====
Portrayed by Meg Wynn Owen, Hazel Bellamy (née Hazel Patricia Forrest; circa 1883–1918) first appears in the episode "Miss Forrest" as secretary to Richard Bellamy; she is a middle class young woman who has been earning a living as a secretary for ten years, against her parents' wishes. This conflict gives the viewer a rare view of the interior of her parents' middle-class home: one of the few domestic locations in the series other than the Bellamys' home. James is immediately attracted to her, and within two years they marry, after she initially declined his proposal, having been married before to a violent alcoholic named Patrick O'Connor. The class divide between James and Hazel causes early conflicts with Hazel's parents, the Bellamys' staff and in the marriage. In the early months of 1914 Hazel suffers a miscarriage which sends her into an extended depression. During the war she falls in love with a young airman named Jack Dyson, who dies in action. Hazel is particularly close to Richard, Georgina and Rose, but Hudson never truly accepts her, a middle-class woman, as mistress of the house. Hazel dies in the Spanish flu pandemic days before World War I ends in 1918.

==== Virginia Bellamy ====
Portrayed by Hannah Gordon, Virginia, Viscountess Bellamy of Haversham (formerly Virginia Hamilton) is the widow of Naval Officer Charles Hamilton (killed during World War I when HMS Monmouth sank in 1914). She meets Richard when she asks for help to establish a fund for the children of naval officers killed in battle, and they initially dislike each other. Virginia returns about a year later, when her seventeen-year-old son Michael (who is at that time serving as a midshipman aboard a British Navy coastal patrol boat) is court-martialled for cowardice. At Hazel's urging, Richard asks family solicitor Sir Geoffrey Dillon to help. Michael is subsequently killed in action. By this point, both Richard and Hazel have become extremely fond of Virginia and her two other children, Alice and William. She becomes a viscountess when she and Richard marry in 1919 and honeymoon in France following the signing of the Versailles Peace Treaty.

=== Other Upstairs characters ===
==== Lady Southwold ====
Veteran actress Cathleen Nesbitt portrayed Mabel Talbot-Carey, Countess of Southwold. She was the mother of Lady Marjorie and grandmother of James and Elizabeth Bellamy. She married Walter Hugo Talbot-Carey, large landowner and influential Conservative politician, sometime in the early 1860s; by this marriage she had two children – Lady Marjorie and Hugo, Lord Ashby and later Earl of Southwold. Her husband also had a brother and at least one nephew, who succeeded Hugo as Earl of Southwold in 1912 when he and his sister Lady Marjorie died in the sinking of the RMS Titanic. She was often accompanied by her useful but snobbish lady's companion Miss Hodges, a clergyman's daughter from Cromer. On a visit to 165 Eaton Place Lady Southwold allegedly loses a valuable brooch, leading to a suspicion of theft by the staff. A Cartier jeweller later arrives at the house stating that she left the item at the shop to have a loose stone reset. At Christmas 1913 she gives Georgina a diamond filigree necklace that has been in the family for four generations. Towards the end of World War I the old lady insists on a private ambulance being used to bring her wounded grandson James back from France. The possibility of Georgina going to 'her grandmother's house at Southwold' is mentioned at the time of Hazel's death, so Lady Southwold was still alive in November 1918. She is not, however, referred to again in any way.

==== Lady Castleton ====
Portrayed by Margaretta Scott, Lady Southwold's sister, Lady Katherine "Kate" Castleton (died 1921), was to have presented Elizabeth to King Edward VII at a Londonderry House ball in 1905. By 1912, she is known as 'stone deaf and not very good company' dying in 1921 and leaving James £1,000, some of which he used to buy an aeroplane.

==== "Bunny," Marquess of Newbury ====
Portrayed by John Quayle, Lord Newbury (later the Marquess of Newbury) is James Bellamy's best friend, who attended the same schools and served as an officer in the Household Cavalry with him. He first appears in the fourth episode of series 1, but was then known as Lieutenant Billy Watson. A meek, quiet, and decent man known to his friends as Bunny, he marries Lady Diana Russell in 1912 having inherited his title and estates the previous year. He served gallantly in the Great War up to 1917 when he was promoted to be an aide-de-camp and taken out of the frontline. Dominated by his spouse, he is happiest playing his expected role of a traditional English country squire, a duty described by his wife as "scratching the backs of pigs with a glazed look in his eye." Faced with his wife's adultery, he refuses to cause a scandal believing that "no man should divorce a woman" and offers to give her grounds instead. When Diana returns to him, he takes her back without a qualm, but the couple remain childless.

==== Diana Newbury ====
Portrayed by Celia Bannerman, Diana, Marchioness of Newbury (née Lady Diana Russell 1883-) is a childhood friend and love interest of James, but taking her mother's advice to 'marry well', weds his wealthy best friend Bunny instead. At a weekend hunting party at Somerby Park in 1913, Diana, jealous and contemptuous of James' middle-class wife Hazel, secretly switches horses on her, nearly causing a disastrous accident. In the spring of 1923 James and Diana meet by chance at an illicit London jazz club and have a weekend fling at a cottage in Sandwich as Diana schemes for them both to run away to the Continent. Diana's plans are thwarted and a divorce scandal looms; James offers to marry her but confesses that the war destroyed the man she once knew and that he cannot 'get on' with life, content instead to watch it go by. Diana, faced with James' ambivalence and defeatism, returns to Bunny who takes her on a world cruise to try and rekindle their relationship.

==== Henrietta Winchmore ====
Portrayed by Jenifer Armitage, Henrietta Winchmore is Elizabeth's best friend; she lives in her own apartment. She is a fellow feminist, and a Fabian socialist who takes Elizabeth in when she runs away from her family after an altercation. Winchmore briefly challenges Richard on his conservative views as opposed to her liberal/radical views, and serves as Elizabeth's maid of honour at her wedding.

==== Julius Karekin ====
Portrayed by Donald Burton, Julius Karekin (born 1875) is a wealthy social climber and a very knowledgeable and talented stockbroker of Armenian descent, who has an affair with the recently separated Elizabeth Kirbridge. He saves Elizabeth from imprisonment by mentioning her family and connections to the police after she takes part in a suffragette attack on a government minister's London home. He uses her to further his career and contacts, and gives Elizabeth a hat shop in Mayfair's Brook Street, and successfully manages the stocks she inherited from a recently deceased great-aunt. To further his influence, Karekin buys the lease on 165 Eaton Place when it is put up for sale upon Lord Southwold's death, subsequently giving the deed to Elizabeth to help save her parents from eviction. Owing to Richard Bellamy's connections, he becomes a good friend of Arthur Balfour, financial adviser to the Tory Party, and a candidate for membership in the exclusive Pall Mall men's club, the Athenaeum. However, Elizabeth and he later part company.

==== Lady Dolly Hale ====
Portrayed by Madeleine Cannon, Lady Dorothy "Dolly" Beatrice Louisa Hale is one of Georgina's closest friends and a fellow "Bright Young Thing". Lady Dolly is the daughter of the Earl of Shelbourne and lives, in 1928, in Mayfair. In 1927, while visiting Georgina, Lady Dolly meets Frederick, the Bellamy's footman, and they soon start an affair. Lady Dolly then secretly arranges for Georgina and Frederick to have to kiss in a film that they are both starring in. Despite this, Georgina and Lady Dolly remain friends, although Frederick leaves service. However, in the summer of 1928, Lady Dolly, Georgina, Lord Stockbridge and three others take part in a scavenger hunt; Georgina drives them down to finish the hunt, and runs over and kills a man on his bicycle. At the ensuing inquest, Lady Dolly, who takes cocaine, gives evidence which harms Georgina's case. After the inquest, Georgina states that she never wants to see Lady Dolly again.

==== Lady Prudence Fairfax ====
Portrayed by Joan Benham, Lady Prudence Fairfax (born 1862) is Lady Marjorie's oldest and closest friend. She makes her first appearance in Series 1, episode 5 "A Suitable Marriage". She can be gossipy and frivolous, but she remains a close and trusted family friend until the end of the complete series. She is informally called "Pru", and James calls her Aunt Pru, although she is not related to the Bellamys. Despite that, she is often included in family celebrations and is considered family by the Bellamys and due to the fact that she is such a constant and familiar presence at 165 Eaton Place, she is well-liked and respected by the Bellamy servants.

The early series reveals that Lady Prudence was married with a daughter in her late teens or early twenties named Agatha. Subsequent series refer to an ageing husband named Archie who dies off screen leaving her a widow; she attends Elizabeth's 1909 wedding with Agatha (her only appearance during the entire run, but with no dialogue). Eventually, Agatha herself gets married. After Lady Marjorie dies, Lady Prudence periodically visits 165 Eaton Place to see how Richard Bellamy and son James are coping. She had also hopes to be the one to marry the widowed Richard, having known him for many years, but even though she did not, remains a close family friend even though Richard is remarried later, to Virginia Hamilton. She was not mentioned in the 2010 continuation, presumably having died in the years (1930 to 1936) between the two incarnations of the show.

==== Mrs. Van Groeben ====
Portrayed by Yolande Turner. A social climbing colonial of Dutch descent, Mrs. Van Groeben (born 1862) is a haughty and unpleasant nouveau riche woman from Cape Town, South Africa. She is married and has a daughter named Wilhelmina, who claims to be 'great, great friends' with Lady Prudence Fairfax's daughter, Agatha, even though they only just met the previous night. Mrs. Van Groeben is an acquaintance of Lady Marjorie, Lady Prudence and Lady Templeton who works with them on a domestic servants aid committee, but her snobbery and condescending attitude result in her being deeply disliked by all three women, especially Lady Templeton. So conceited is she, that she believes that she is a subject of envy in London society. Mrs. Van Groeben employs a young footman named William, whom she adopted from an orphanage (while she was still in South Africa) and appears to be overly fond of. In the episode I Dies from Love, set during the summer of 1907, the scullery maid, Emily, falls in love with William and the two spend most of their days off together. When Mrs. Van Groeben discovers the relationship, she becomes jealous and forbids William from ever having any more to do with Emily, and bribes him with a new uniform and a promotion. When William cruelly drops Emily, Emily is so devastated that she hangs herself. When Lady Marjorie reveals the news about Emily, Mrs. Van Groeben is uncaring about what happened. After the episode, she is mentioned only once more when Lady Marjorie states how much she had liked a dinner that Mrs. Bridges had made.

==== Lawrence Kirbridge ====
Portrayed by Ian Ogilvy, socialist poet Lawrence Arthur Kirbridge (born 1879) is Elizabeth Bellamy's first husband. The maternal grandson of a Dorset baronet, he was educated at the University of Cambridge and married Elizabeth in June 1908 or 1909. (Note: According to Series One, they marry in 1909. In Series Two, however, the date was changed, and they were said to have married in 1908.) Their marriage soon falls apart as Lawrence is not only an unrealistic romantic, but is also uninterested in sex (at least with women; there is the strong suggestion that he is in fact homosexual, such as the all-male parties held at the newlyweds' house, and the rather charged relationship Lawrence has with his manservant). Unwilling to accept marital responsibilities and unable to consummate the marriage, he encourages his publisher to seduce Elizabeth instead. The event occurs at a soiree in the Kirbridge home, but it does little to improve their marriage. When three months later Elizabeth seeks an annulment, the affair and a surprise pregnancy come to light, and to avoid scandal Lawrence is given an allowance and sent abroad, to return only for the sake of appearances at the baby's christening, where he accepts paternity.

==== Robert, Marquess of Stockbridge ====
Portrayed by Anthony Andrews, Lord Robert Charles Algernon St. John Stockbridge, Marquess of Stockbridge (born 1901) is the son of the Duke and Duchess of Buckminster. He is a somewhat reluctant member of Georgina Worsley and Lady Dolly's social group of 'wild young things'. He and Georgina fall in love, but his parents insist that he be sent on a long trip around the world without her before they will give him their permission to marry, which they do in the summer of 1930.

==== Sir Geoffrey Dillon ====
Portrayed by Raymond Huntley, Sir Geoffrey Dillon (born 1838) is the Talbot-Carey family solicitor, as well as the Bellamy family solicitor and a personal friend of Richard and Lady Marjorie. His first loyalty is to the Talbot-Careys, but he often proves helpful to the Bellamys as well. Sir Geoffrey was originally called Sir George Dillon in John Hawkesworth's novelisation of the show's scripts. The character appeared throughout the show until the very last episode, meaning that if the timeline were to be accurate, Dillon was still practising law at the age of 92.

== Downstairs ==
=== Alfred Harris ===
Portrayed by George Innes, Alfred Harris (1868–1913) is the original footman at Eaton Place from 1895. In 1905 he is forced to flee in disgrace after being caught in a sexual situation with an upstairs guest, Baron Klaus von Rimmer. In 1913, Alfred returns to Eaton Place in search of refuge, after murdering his most recent employer (and lover). A dramatic standoff results, with Alfred holding Edward hostage at knifepoint. Alfred is subsequently hanged, although Rose protests against the sentence, arguing it was not right to execute a person 'who's not right in the head.'

=== Daisy Peel (later Barnes) ===
Daisy Barnes (née Daisy Peel) (born 11 May 1895) is the under house parlour maid from 1913 to 1918, and the head house parlour maid from 1919 to 1930, when she goes with Edward to work for Lord and Lady Stockbridge. Daisy was raised in a poor family in the London slums, and she is especially sympathetic to the struggles of the working class. She is portrayed by Jacqueline Tong, who was nominated for an Emmy (Outstanding Continuing Performance by a Supporting Actress).

=== Edward Barnes ===
Portrayed by Christopher Beeny, Edward Barnes (born 24 January 1889) replaces Alfred as footman in 1906, and stays until he leaves to go to war in 1915, having just married Daisy. Edward is a high-spirited, honest and happy person and the source of happy banter, but suffers from severe shell shock after returning from the front. After the war, and following a short period in which he and Daisy leave service, he becomes chauffeur and under butler to the Bellamys, and in 1930 he becomes butler to Lord and Lady Stockbridge.

=== Emily ===
Portrayed by Evin Crowley, the devout Catholic Irish kitchen maid Aoibhinn (pronunciation the same as the Anglicised version of the actress's name) is known in the house as Emily (1881–1907). She is a very kind, if awkward, girl who is frequently scolded by Mrs Bridges. In the episode I Dies From Love, Emily falls hopelessly in love with a footman named William from the household of Lady Bellamy's committee associate, Mrs. Van Groeben. They spend several of their days off together, and Emily desperately wants to marry him. However, when an envious Mrs. Van Groeben tells William he cannot see Emily any more, William drops her, revealing that he never cared about her anyway; he tells his mistress "It was only a bit of fun". But no-one (except for Rose) really understands how much in love Emily is. Mrs. Bridges quite savagely dresses Emily down about her affections for William. She is completely lost without William, and when he cruelly ignores her on his next visit to the house and returns her love letter unopened, Emily is so distraught that she commits suicide. Mrs. Bridges's bad conscience over the suicide is not assuaged until Sarah, an under-parlour maid who has worked for a carnival, leads a fake seance in which Sarah relays Emily's forgiveness to Mrs. Bridges.

=== Frederick Norton ===
Portrayed by Gareth Hunt, Frederick Norton (1885–?) first appears as James Bellamy's Army batman Trooper Norton when he arrives at Eaton Place to return some of James's belongings when James is believed killed in October 1917. After the war, and following Edward's departure, Frederick is hired by James as footman. In June 1927, Frederick and Lady Dolly Hale start an affair, and Frederick resigns to start a new life in films and as an escort.

=== Gregory Wilmot ===
Gregory Wilmot, 1914

Portrayed by Keith Barron, Sergeant Gregory Walter Wilmot (circa 1879 – 1916) is Rose's fiancé. A British sheep farmer living in Australia, he has socialist views. He and Rose meet on a tram in April 1914 when he accidentally sits on a plum cake she is carrying. They soon start courting, and within a week, Rose agrees to go back to Australia with him and become his wife, but hesitant and fearful, she changes her mind at the last minute. A later exchange of letters clears up the alleged rumour that he already had a wife. After the outbreak of war, he becomes a sergeant in the ANZACs and fights at the Battle of Gallipoli. While on leave in London 1916, he seeks out Rose and they agree to marry when the war ends; later there is a brief mention that they will marry on his next leave in London. However, late in 1916 he is killed by a sniper while returning from patrol and dies instantly. He leaves Rose £1200 in his will; Rose keeps the money as a talisman of their relationship until losing it in the 1929 stock market crash, her investment having been advised by James Bellamy.

=== Mr Angus Hudson ===
Angus Hudson (1856–?) is known as "Hudson" to the Bellamys, and as "Mr. Hudson" to the servants. Hudson originally came from Scotland, born to Ian and Margaret Hudson; he also has a brother Donald and a sister Fiona. He works as the butler of Eaton Place, and is known for his conservative views. He is portrayed by Gordon Jackson, who won an Emmy (Supporting Actor, Single Performance, Comedy or Drama Series, for the episode "The Beastly Hun.").

=== Lily Hawkins ===
Portrayed by Karen Dotrice, Lily Hawkins (born circa 1901 in Shoreditch, London) arrives at Eaton Place as under house parlour maid in January or May 1919 to replace Daisy, who has left for a new life with Edward. Lily is a quiet, hardworking and caring girl. In the spring of 1924, Lily and Hudson start to spend their time off together and Hudson expresses a desire to marry her. However, Lily sees Hudson as more of a father figure. She leaves Eaton Place without telling anyone and goes to live with her widowed mother in Banbury.

=== Miss Maude Roberts ===
Portrayed by Patsy Smart, Maude Roberts (1850–?) is Lady Marjorie's long-time Lady's maid (or personal maid). Known as "Roberts" upstairs and "Miss Roberts" downstairs, she is often fussy and suspicious of those around her, both upstairs and downstairs. During an afternoon tea in the servant's hall she reveals a little about herself to the other servants stating that as a young woman her father had caught her dating a young man. Displeased, he later sent her into domestic service where she has risen through the ranks to her lady's maid position and remained to the present. In April 1912, Miss Roberts survives the sinking of the RMS Titanic while travelling to America with Lady Marjorie, who perishes. After being listed as missing, Miss Roberts shows up at 165 Eaton Place, to the astonishment of the household, having not been registered on the Carpathia's manifest of survivors. She is however emotionally disturbed by the sinking and loss of Lady Marjorie, taking the blame personally, and is later sent off by Richard to a psychiatric ward.

=== Mrs Kate Bridges ===
Kate Hudson, née Bridges (1858–sometime after 1931) was the cook at 165, Eaton Place throughout the whole series. She was portrayed by Angela Baddeley, who was nominated twice for an Emmy (Outstanding Continuing Performance by a Supporting Actress). In later life she outwardly appears to be a tyrannical and harsh battle-axe, particularly to the awkward scullery-maid, Ruby, but she is a kind and affectionate woman and regards Ruby as the daughter she never had. When another maid, Emily, commits suicide after her suitor coldly rejected her, Mrs. Bridges felt guilt for constantly nagging and scolding Emily. Information given on-screen about the marital status of Mrs Bridges was contradictory. In the first series episode "Why Is Her Door Locked?", Mrs Bridges mentions a husband who died fifteen years previously; and in the episode featuring a visit to the house by King Edward VII, Lady Marjorie states that their cook was not a French chef but "a temperamental widow from Bristol." However, in the third series finale "The Sudden Storm", Mr Hudson states that there was never a "Mr Bridges", but that the "Mrs" was a courtesy title customarily applied to a cook in a gentleman's household. In the final episode, she and Hudson are married and moved to open a seaside boarding house in Hastings. Kate was still alive and well in 1931 (Rose wrote to 'Mrs Hudson' that year according to the second TV Times Upstairs Downstairs special).

=== Pearce ===
Portrayed by Brian Osborne, Mr Pearce (1872–?), whose first name is never revealed, is the coachman from 1903 until 1909, when he is replaced by the much-more resourceful and motivated Thomas Watkins. According to the narrative, Pearce does not like new-fangled motor cars, and returns to his previous position as head groom to Lady Wanborough tending to her stables.

=== Rose Buck ===
Rose Buck (born 1873) was born to a gamekeeper and his wife on the Southwold estate where Lady Marjorie was born and raised. At the age of 13 she entered service. She says that as a child, she watched a cart arrive on the estate with various goods from London and then leave again and longed to know where it had been, and so went into service with Lady Marjorie when asked. Rose says that, many times during her adult life, she wished she had never noticed the cart. Kind-hearted and loyal but slightly naïve, she is the head house parlourmaid at Eaton Place from 1903 to 1919 (including a short stint as Elizabeth Kirbridge's lady's maid and between maid in Greenwich), and Virginia Bellamy's lady's maid from 1919 to 1930. During the war years she also works as a conductress. She is portrayed by Jean Marsh, who was nominated for an Emmy for Best Actress in a Drama series four times, winning once. In the revival series, Upstairs, Downstairs (2010), in 1936, Rose is running her own domestic service agency but is persuaded to return to 165 Eaton Place and serve as housekeeper for its new household. By 1938, however, she has contracted tuberculosis, and is living in a sanitorium. Rose remains in the sanitorium as the series concludes, just as World War II begins in September 1939.

=== Ruby Finch ===
Portrayed by Jenny Tomasin, Ruby Finch (born Bradford, 1892) is the scullery maid at Eaton Place. She was preceded by Doris, Nellie, and Emily. Ruby first comes to Eaton Place in 1908 or 1909, just after Elizabeth's marriage to Lawrence. She is initially illiterate, guileless, and prone to distraction. During the next several years she learns to read well and makes progress toward becoming a skilled cook. She leaves the house in 1915 to become a munitionette at Silvertown, but returns early in the following year when the factory is destroyed in the Silvertown explosion. She briefly leaves again in 1929 to become maid of all work to the middle class Mrs Waddilove. In 1930 she goes with Mr and Mrs Hudson to work at their boarding house, with hopes to inherit it later.

=== Sarah Moffat ===
Portrayed by Pauline Collins, Sarah Moffat (born July 1882, also known as Clémence Dumas, Clémence Moffat, and Sarah Delice) claims to be the daughter of Albert Moffat and Marianne Dumas and the great-granddaughter of Alexandre Dumas. She had a brother, Charlie, who died young, and a sister named Sophia. Illiterate and inexperienced, she is sent to Eaton Place by an agency for domestic servants. She is given the name Sarah by Lady Marjorie. She quickly strikes up an unlikely friendship with head house parlourmaid, Rose.

In June 1904, Richard Bellamy commissions Guthrie Scone to paint his wife. Sarah is sent to deliver Lady Marjorie's dresses to his studio, and soon Scone is painting her as well. When both paintings are exhibited together as "The Mistress" and "The Maids", Sarah and Rose, whom Scone has painted from Sarah's descriptions, are nearly dismissed, but Scone persuades Richard to keep them on. Two months later, Sarah, upset by James's half-hearted affections, leaves Eaton Place.

In 1908, Sarah returns to Eaton Place but leaves again soon after when she is accused of theft. She then begins a career as music hall entertainer Clémence Dumas/Sarah Delice, known for saucy songs like "What Are We Going to Do with Uncle Arthur?" At about the same time, she starts an affair with James Bellamy and becomes pregnant, resulting in James's being sent to India. Sarah loses the baby and ultimately marries the Bellamys' chauffeur, Thomas Watkins, and they leave service. Their lives after leaving Eaton Place are portrayed in the spinoff series Thomas & Sarah.

=== Thomas Watkins ===
Portrayed by John Alderton, Thomas David Watkins (born circa 1876) grew up in Wales. In June 1909, he becomes manservant and later chauffeur to Lawrence and Elizabeth Kirbridge, and friends with Rose. Thomas is a bright and resourceful man, looking for "scope" (every opportunity to better himself) and so learns everything he can about driving and fixing motor cars. He identifies himself to Richard Bellamy as "chapel", an expression used for members of independent or nonconformist places of worship: and he certainly is an independent thinker. He can be both kind and very harsh. When the Kirbridge marriage ends, Thomas becomes chauffeur to the Bellamys at Eaton Place where he ultimately blackmails Richard and Lady Marjorie, and leaves service to marry Sarah and to set up a garage business together.
