= Meg Wynn Owen =

British actress (1939–2022)

- Wynn Owen in Blue Blood (1973)
- Born: Margaret Shuttleworth; 8 November 1939; Lancaster, Lancashire, England
- Died: June 2022 (aged 82)
- Other name: Margaret Wright
- Occupation: Actress
- Years active: 1961–2011
- Spouse: William Wright (1967–1987)

Margaret Wright (née Shuttleworth, 8 November 1939 – June 2022), better known as Meg Wynn Owen, was a British actress known for her role as Hazel Bellamy in Upstairs, Downstairs. She also appeared in Gosford Park, Love Actually, Pride & Prejudice, Irina Palm, The Duellists and A Woman of Substance.

== Early life ==
Wynn Owen was born Margaret Shuttleworth on 8 November 1939 in Lancaster, daughter of Margaret (née Brinnand) and Miles Shuttleworth. When she was 13, she moved to Hoyland to live with her mother's friend Ruth Wynn Owen, who was a drama coach and actor, and her husband Ian Danby. After graduating from the Royal Academy of Dramatic Art (RADA) in 1956, she used her professional name, Meg Wynn Owen.

== Personal life and death ==
Wynn Owen was married to Australian artist William Wright from 1967 to 1987. In later life she suffered from dementia. She died in June 2022, aged 82.

In November 2022, it was reported that her friend Brian Malam, to whom she had given power of attorney, had pleaded guilty to fraud for stealing £65,000 from her bank accounts, and was sentenced to 32 months in prison.

== Filmography (selected) ==
=== Films ===
Year	Title	Role	Notes
1962	Only Two Can Play	Dilys	
1971	Under Milk Wood	Lily Smalls	
1973	Blue Blood	Beate Krug	
1973	Malachi's Cove	Mally's Mother	
1977	The Duellists	Leonie d’Hubert	
1987	The Dirty Dozen: The Deadly Mission	Julia Flamands	
2001	Last Orders	Joan	
2001	Gosford Park	Lewis	
2002	Possession	Mrs Lees	
2003	Love, Actually	PM's secretary	
2004	Vanity Fair	Lady Crawley	
2005	Pride & Prejudice	Mrs Reynolds	
2006	Scoop	housekeeper	
2007	Irina Palm	Julia	
2010	Hereafter	Mirror lady	

=== Television ===
Year	Title	Role	Notes
1962	The Franchise Affair	Betty Kane	3 episodes
1963	Lorna Doone	Annie Ridd	10 episodes
1964	Esther Waters	Esther Waters	
1970	Smith	Miss Mansfield	5 episodes
1972	Breeze Anstey	Lorn	
1973-1974	Upstairs, Downstairs	Hazel Bellamy, née Forrest	21 episodes
1978	Will Shakespeare	Anne Shakespeare	
1983	On the Razzle	Frau Fischer	TV film
1984	Scarecrow and Mrs King	Lady Gwyneth Bromfield	1 episode
1984	The Wedding	Mrs Jackson	
1984	Travelling Man	Gwen Owen	1 episode
1985	A Woman of Substance	Elizabeth Harte	
1985	The Mimosa Boys	Kathleen	TV film
1987	White Lady	White Lady	
1994	The Lifeboat	Vera Parry	3 episodes
2003	Doctors	Marjorie Blake	1 episode: series 5, episode 28
2004	Family Business	Iris Brooker	6 episodes
2004	Holby City	Anna Jones	1 episode: series 6, episode 38
2007	The Last Detective	Sheila Hopper	1 episode: series 4, episode 3
2008	The Bill	Vera Andrews	1 episode: series 24, episode 5
2009	Doctors	Eloise Beckley	1 episode: series 11, episode 79
2010	Doctor Who	Old Isabella	A Christmas Carol episode
2011	The Jury	Olive Livingstone	Series 2

== Theatre ==
Year	Title	Role	Notes
1965	Macbeth	Lady Macbeth	Assembly Hall, Edinburgh
1975	Travesties	Gwendolen Carr	Albery Theatre, London, Royal Shakespeare Company (RSC)
1977	Absent Friends	Marge	Eisenhower Theater, Washington DC
1978	Night of the Iguana	Hannah Jelks	Center Stage, Baltimore
1979	A Meeting by the River	Penelope	Palace Theater, Broadway
1981	Bodies	Helen	Long Wharf Theatre, New Haven
1982	Good	Helen	The Other Place, Stratford-upon-Avon (RSC)
2009	Pygmalion	Mrs Higgins	Clwyd Theatr Cymru, Mold
2010	In The Pipeline	Joan	Traverse Theatre, Edinburgh
