= Angus Hudson =

Fictional character

Gordon Jackson as Angus Hudson

Angus Hudson is a fictional character from the ITV (Independent Television) drama Upstairs, Downstairs, portrayed by actor Gordon Jackson from 1971, until 1975.

== Biography ==
Hudson was a featured character in sixty episodes from 1971 until 1975 (1903–1930 in the series' timeline). Hudson is portrayed in the show as a Scottish butler of the Bellamy household and acts as supervisor to all the servant staff. The character also mentions having previously worked as a footman on Lady Marjorie's estate. He has a younger brother, Donald, who works as a civil engineer; Hudson marries the character Mrs. Bridges (Angela Baddeley) at the series finale.

== Personality ==
Hudson is characterised as a well-educated man from a working-class background. He is usually portrayed as kind-hearted, organised, neat, and occasionally humorous, although he sometimes shows a darker side to his character. He discusses football periodically in the series and is written as a Chelsea fan. Politically, Hudson is a conservative and monarchist who defers to his "betters", and he regularly speaks out against the Liberal Party, the Labour Party and trade union militancy. Hudson does occasionally say that he would have preferred a Stuart on the British throne, hinting at sympathy for the Jacobite cause. Hudson is shown as generally loyal to the Bellamy Family.

== Awards ==
Gordon Jackson, who portrayed Hudson, won the British Actor of the Year Award in 1974 and an Emmy Award for Outstanding Single Performance by a Supporting Actor in 1975 for the episode "The Beastly Hun".
