= David Langton =

Scottish actor (1912–1994)

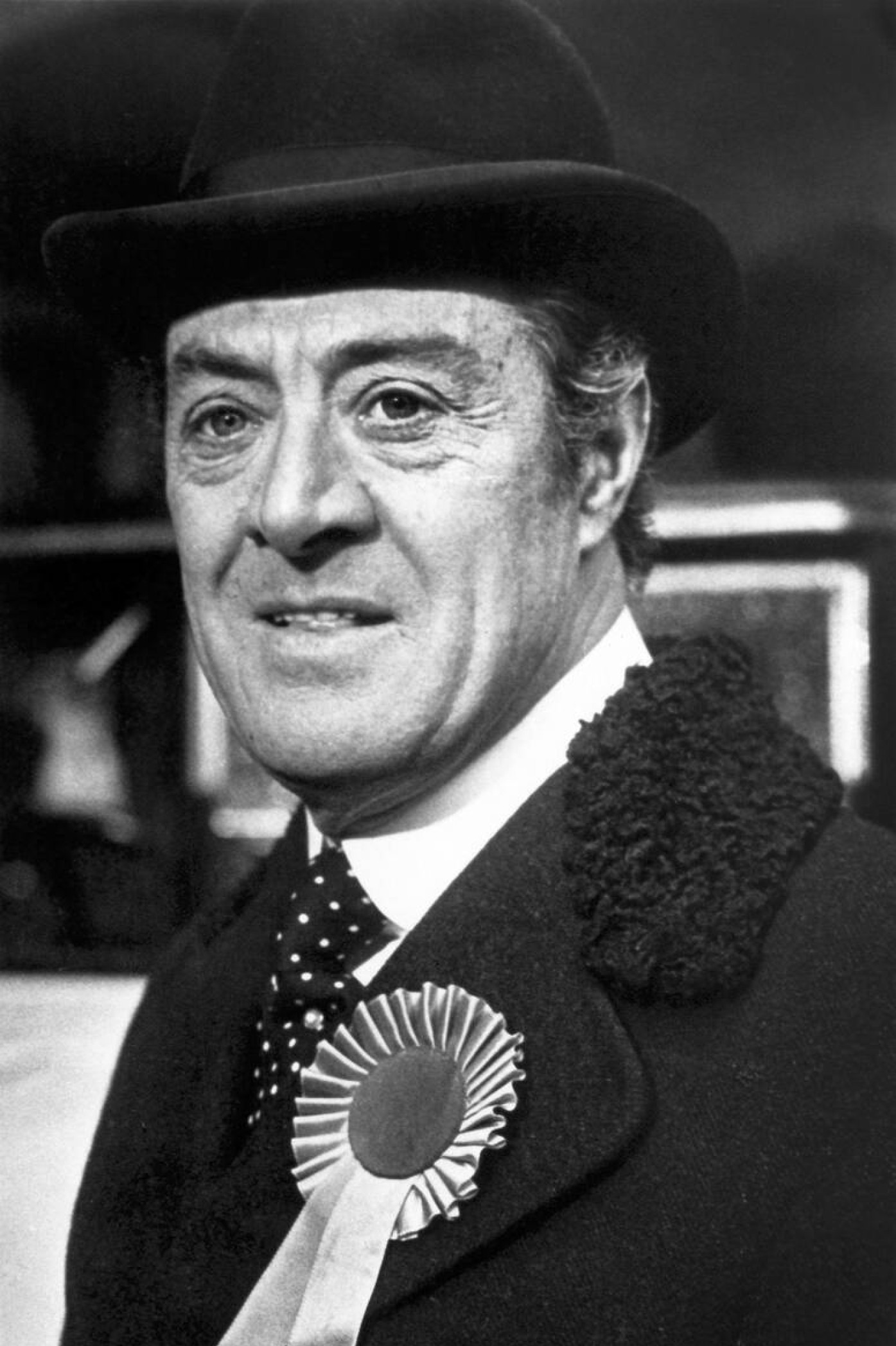
- Langton as Richard Bellamy
- Born: Basil Muir Langton-Dodds; 16 April 1912; Motherwell, Lanarkshire, Scotland
- Died: 25 April 1994 (aged 82); Stratford-upon-Avon, Warwickshire, England
- Years active: 1955–1993
- Spouses: Mona Copeman (m. 1940; div. 1966); Claire Green (m. 1975)
- Children: 3, including Simon

David Muir Langton (born Basil Muir Langton-Dodds; 16 April 1912 – 25 April 1994) was a British actor who is best remembered for playing Richard Bellamy in the period drama Upstairs, Downstairs.

== Early years ==
Langton was born to a middle-class family in Motherwell, Scotland in 1912. His father was a wine merchant. Langton's family moved to England when he was four years old. He attended a prep school in Bath, Somerset, and left education at the age of 16. Langton's father had always encouraged him to go into acting and got him his first job touring with a small Shakespearean company.

At 19 years old, Langton left the theatre and went to live on Yell, a remote island in Shetland, and became a sheep farmer while attempting to become a writer. However, he later admitted this was a "disaster", and when he went back to the mainland when his mother was ill, he realised he did not want to return. In 1938, Langton returned to working full-time in theatre. It was at this time that he changed his name to David Langton, as there was already an actor called Basil Langton, and his legal name was David Muir Langton. However, in 1939 the war broke out and Langton soon enlisted. He first served in the Royal Artillery ending up a sergeant and was later commissioned in the Northumberland Hussars and ended up a major. Langton served in France, Germany and Belgium. He married his first wife, Rosemary, in 1940. When the war ended, they realised that the marriage had been a mistake, but stayed together for the sake of their three sons, Simon, Andrew and Robin. The eldest, Simon, a director, would later work with his father on the set of Upstairs, Downstairs. Langton and his first wife divorced in 1966.

== After the war ==
Within four days of leaving the Army following the end of the war, Langton was cast in a play called Fifty Fifty and in 1950, following some periods of unemployment, he got a part in Seagulls Over Sorrento. Following the death of his father, Langton went missing and was discovered in New York City, where he was en route to see his brother Donald in Canada. He later explained that he needed a break, and soon returned to Seagulls Over Sorrento, which finished its run in 1953. Following Seagulls Over Sorrento, he acted in many plays, including Agatha Christie's Rule of Three and The Devil's Disciple, where he met and formed a friendship with Tyrone Power.

== Television career ==
David Langton had started his television career in the 1950s and went on in the 1960s to appear in The Troubleshooters, Out of the Unknown, The Avengers, The Champions, Dr. Finlay's Casebook and Special Branch. He also appeared in films such as The Trials of Oscar Wilde (1960), A Hard Day's Night (1964) and The Liquidator (1965).

In 1968, director Douglas Camfield chose Langton to portray Colonel Lethbridge-Stewart in the Doctor Who serial The Web of Fear, but Langton dropped out to perform in a TV play before production began. Camfield cast Nicholas Courtney instead, with the character going on to become a long running presence in the show.

Langton achieved international notice for playing husband and father Richard Bellamy in the period drama Upstairs, Downstairs which began in 1971. He was given the role after a chance encounter with producer John Whitney at the Garrick Club in London. During some of Upstairs, Downstairs's run, Langton actually lived in Eaton Place, the square in Belgravia where Upstairs, Downstairs was set and where exterior scenes were filmed.

== Later years ==
Following the success of Upstairs, Downstairs, Langton appeared in the 1972 BBC Television adaptation of Dorothy L. Sayers's Lord Peter Wimsey mystery Clouds of Witness, as the Duke of Denver (older brother to Lord Peter Wimsey); the film The Incredible Sarah (1976); and Robert Altman's science fiction film Quintet (1979), starring Paul Newman. In the 1980s, he appeared on television in The Spoils of War and Witness for the Prosecution (1982); he played Sir Charles Baskerville in the 1983 HBO film The Hound of the Baskervilles, as well as Lord Mountbatten of Burma in Charles & Diana: A Royal Love Story (1982), and H. H. Asquith in Number 10. He played Victor Frankham in Hammer House of Mystery and Suspense (1984), and appeared in the film The Whistle Blower (1986) opposite Michael Caine. His final television appearances were in The Case-Book of Sherlock Holmes (The Illustrious Client) and Absolutely in 1991, and The Good Guys in 1992. Langton also continued to work as a theatre actor, appearing in Night and Day, Ross and Beyond Reasonable Doubt.

Langton married his second wife, Claire Green, the former wife of TV host Hughie Green, in May 1975.

He suffered a fatal heart attack and died in Stratford-upon-Avon in 1994. In his obituaries it was noted that he was 82, ten years older than his "official age". The obituaries also paid tribute to him as a "popular and easygoing man" who always "behaved like a gentleman".

== Filmography ==
Year	Title	Role	Notes
1937	Alibi Breaker	Peter Bradfield Under his real name Basil Langton	
1955	The Ship That Died of Shame	Man in Coastal Forces Club Bar	Uncredited
1957	Seven Waves Away	John Hayden	
1957	Saint Joan	Captain of Warwick's Guard	
1960	The Trials of Oscar Wilde	Frank	Uncredited
1960	The World of Suzie Wong	Police Inspector	Uncredited
1961	The World of Tim Frazer	Roger Thornton	TV series
1964	The Pumpkin Eater	1st Man in Bar	Uncredited
1964	A Hard Day's Night	Actor in Dressing Room	Uncredited
1965	The Liquidator	Station Commander	
1965	Out of the Unknown ('The Dead Past', episode)	Thadeus Araman	
1976	The Incredible Sarah	Duc De Morny	
1978	L'Amour en question	Sir Geoffrey	
1979	Quintet	Goldstar	
1982	Charles & Diana: A Royal Love Story	Lord Mountbatten of Burma	
1982	Witness for the Prosecution	Mayhew	
1983	The Hound of the Baskervilles	Sir Charles Baskerville	
1986	The Whistle Blower	Government Minister	
