= Jacqueline Tong =

English actress

- Born: 21 February 1950 (age 76); Bristol, England
- Other name: Jackie Tong
- Education: Rose Bruford College
- Occupation: Actress
- Years active: 1973–present
- Spouse: Gordon Roberts Nicholas (m. 1983)

Jacqueline Tong (born 21 February 1950) is an English actress. She is best known for playing Daisy Peel in the television series Upstairs, Downstairs (1973–1975), for which she was nominated for a Primetime Emmy Award for Outstanding Continuing Performance by a Supporting Actress in a Drama Series in 1977.

== Early life ==
Tong was born in Bristol in 1950, and attended Rose Bruford College. She started her television career in the 1970s, and one of her early roles was in an episode of Thriller.

== Career ==
In 1973, she joined the cast of Upstairs, Downstairs as the new housemaid Daisy Peel (later Barnes). She played this role for 32 episodes until the programme ended in 1975. After Upstairs, Downstairs, she went back to theatre and played at Coventry rep. She also had roles on television in Hard Times, Spearhead, Thriller (1 episode, 1974), and, alongside Lesley-Anne Down who had appeared with her in Upstairs, Downstairs, in The One and Only Phyllis Dixey. From February to April 1982, Tong made several appearances in Coronation Street as Jackie Moffat, a neighbour of Gail Tilsley. During the 1980s and 1990s, she appeared in Growing Rich, Middlemarch and David Copperfield.

Tong has also appeared in three films, How to Get Ahead in Advertising (1989), Princess Caraboo (1994) and Angel (2007), and has done extensive radio work including Are You Listening? by Jacqueline Wilson (Eileen) in 1981, a ten-part dramatisation of the novel Evelina by Fanny Burney (Mrs Mirvan) in 2002, The Iliad in 2002 and The Hidden Story of Sex also in 2002. Tong's stage credits include The Winter's Tale, What I Did in the Holidays and Albertine in Five Times.

In 2000, she appeared in The Bill and The 10th Kingdom. This was followed in 2001 by The Life and Adventures of Nicholas Nickleby and The Cazalets. Tong played Lynn Walker in the fifth and sixth Trial & Retribution programmes. In 2005, she appeared in Twenty Thousand Streets Under the Sky. She appears as Mrs Todd in the 2016 film of Dad's Army.
