= Gordon Jackson (actor) =

Scottish actor (1923–1990)

Gordon Jackson OBE
- Jackson as Mr. Hudson in Upstairs, Downstairs
- Born: Gordon Cameron Jackson; 19 December 1923; Glasgow, Scotland
- Died: 15 January 1990 (aged 66); South Kensington, London, England
- Occupation: Actor
- Years active: 1942–1990
- Spouse: Rona Anderson (m. 1951)

Gordon Cameron Jackson (19 December 1923 – 15 January 1990) was a Scottish actor. He is best remembered for his roles as the butler Angus Hudson in Upstairs, Downstairs and as George Cowley, the head of CI5, in The Professionals. He also portrayed Capt Jimmy Cairns in Tunes of Glory, and Flt. Lt. Andrew MacDonald, "Intelligence", in The Great Escape.

In 1960, Jackson was nominated for the BAFTA Award for Best British Actor for the film Yesterday's Enemy and in 1975 was nominated for the BAFTA Award for Best Actor for the television series Upstairs, Downstairs. The following year he won the Emmy Award for Outstanding Single Performance by a Supporting Actor in a Comedy or Drama Series.

== Early life ==
Jackson was born on 19 December 1923 in Glasgow, the youngest of five children. He attended Hillhead High School, and in his youth he took part in BBC radio shows including Children's Hour. He left school aged 15 and became a draughtsman for Rolls-Royce.

== Early career ==
Jackson's film career began in 1942, when producers from Ealing Studios were looking for a young Scot to act in The Foreman Went to France and he was suggested for the part. After this, he returned to his job at Rolls-Royce, but he was soon asked to do more films, and he decided to make acting his career. Jackson soon appeared in other films, including Millions Like Us, San Demetrio London, The Captive Heart, Eureka Stockade and Whisky Galore!. In the early years of his career, Jackson also worked in repertory theatre in Glasgow, Worthing and Perth.

In 1949, Jackson starred in the film Floodtide, along with actress Rona Anderson. He and Anderson married two years later on 2 June 1951. They had two sons, Graham and Roddy. The same year, he made his London stage debut, appearing in the play Seagulls Over Sorrento by Hugh Hastings.

In the 1950s and 1960s Jackson appeared on television in programmes such as The Adventures of Robin Hood, ABC of Britain, Gideon's Way and The Avengers. In 1955 he had a small part in The Quatermass Xperiment, the film version of the BBC TV serial. He later had supporting roles in the films The Great Escape, The Bridal Path and The Ipcress File. In 1969, he and his wife had important roles in The Prime of Miss Jean Brodie. That year, he played Horatio in Tony Richardson's production of Hamlet and he won a Clarence Derwent Award for Best Supporting Actor, having also taken part in the film version.

== Later career ==
Jackson became a household name playing the stern Scottish butler Angus Hudson in 60 episodes of the period drama Upstairs, Downstairs from 1971 to 1975. In 1976, he won an Emmy Award for Outstanding Single Performance by a Supporting Actor for the episode "The Beastly Hun". In 1974, he was named British Actor of the Year and in 1979 he was made an OBE. Jackson was cast opposite Bette Davis for the American television film Madame Sin (1972), which was released in overseas markets as a feature film.

Jackson's next big television role was in the hard-hitting police drama The Professionals from 1977. He played George Cowley in all 57 episodes of the programme, which ended in 1983, although filming finished in 1981. He played Noel Strachan in the Australian Second World War drama A Town Like Alice (1981), winning a Logie Award for his performance.

After A Town Like Alice and The Professionals, Jackson continued his television work with appearances in Hart to Hart, Campion and Shaka Zulu and the films The Shooting Party and The Whistle Blower. He also appeared in the theatre, appearing in Cards on the Table, adapted from the novel by Agatha Christie at the Vaudeville Theatre in 1981 and in Mass Appeal by Bill C. Davis at the Lyric Hammersmith in 1982. From 1985 to 1986, Jackson narrated two afternoon cookery shows in New Zealand for TVNZ called Fresh and Fancy Fare and its successor Country Fare. His last role before his death was in Effie's Burning, and this was broadcast posthumously. Jackson also appeared in the 1988 television miniseries Noble House alongside Pierce Brosnan.

== Death ==
In December 1989, Jackson was diagnosed with bone cancer; he died on 15 January 1990, aged 66, in South Kensington, London. He was cremated at Golders Green Crematorium.

== Filmography ==
Year	Title	Role	Notes
1941	Target for Tonight	Rear Gunner	Uncredited
1942	One of Our Aircraft Is Missing		Uncredited
1943	Women Aren't Angels	Man in Small Orchestra	
1943	Nine Men	The Young 'Un	
1943	Millions Like Us	Fred Blake	
1944	San Demetrio London	Messbo John Jamieson	
1945	Pursuit to Algiers	Steward	Uncredited
1945	Pink String and Sealing Wax	David Sutton	
1946	The Captive Heart	Lieutenant Lennox	
1948	Against the Wind	Duncan	
1949	Eureka Stockade	Tom Kennedy	
1949	Floodtide	David Shields	
1949	Stop Press Girl	Jock Melville	
1949	Whisky Galore!	George Campbell	
1950	Bitter Springs	Mac	
1951	Happy Go Lovely	Paul Tracy	
1951	The Lady with a Lamp	Dr. Anson	
1952	Castle in the Air	Hiker	
1953	Death Goes to School	Detective Inspector Campbell	
1953	Malta Story	British Soldier at Anti-Aircraft Battery	Uncredited
1953	Meet Mr Lucifer	Hector	
1954	The Love Lottery	Ralph	
1955	The Delavine Affair	Florian	
1955	Passage Home	Ted Burns	
1955	The Quatermass Xperiment	BBC TV Producer	
1955	Windfall	Leonard	
1956	Women Without Men	Percy	
1956	Pacific Destiny	District Officer	
1956	The Baby and the Battleship	Harry	
1956	Sailor Beware!	Carnoustie Bligh	
1957	Seven Waves Away	John Merritt	
1957	Hell Drivers	Scottie	
1957	Man in the Shadow	Jimmy Norris	
1958	Blind Spot	"Chalky" White	
1958	Rockets Galore!	George Campbell	
1959	Three Crooked Men	Don Wescot	
1959	Yesterday's Enemy	Sgt. Mackenzie	
1959	The Bridal Path	PC Alec	
1959	Blind Date	Sergeant	
1959	The Navy Lark	Leading Seaman Johnson	
1960	The Price of Silence	Roger Fenton	
1960	Tunes of Glory	Captain Jimmy Cairns, M.C.	
1960	Snowball	Bill Donovan	
1961	Greyfriars Bobby	Farmer	
1961	Two Wives at One Wedding	Tom	
1962	Mutiny on the Bounty	Seaman Edward Birkett	
1963	The Great Escape	Flight Lieutenant Andy MacDonald	
1964	The Long Ships	Vahlin	
1964	Daylight Robbery	Sergeant	
1965	The Ipcress File	Jock Carswell	
1965	Operation Crossbow	R.A.F. Pilot	Scenes deleted
1965	Those Magnificent Men in Their Flying Machines	MacDougal	
1966	Cast a Giant Shadow	James MacAfee	
1966	The Fighting Prince of Donegal	Captain Leeds	
1966	Triple Cross	British Sergeant Questioning Chapman	Uncredited
1967	The Night of the Generals	Captain Engel	
1967	Danger Route	Brian Stern	
1969	The Prime of Miss Jean Brodie	Gordon Lowther	
1969	Run Wild, Run Free	Mr. Ransome	
1969	Hamlet	Horatio	
1970	Scrooge	Tom	
1971	Kidnapped	Charles Stewart	
1972	Madame Sin	Commander Cavendish	
1975	Russian Roulette	Hardison	
1977	Golden Rendezvous	Dr. Marston	
1978	The Medusa Touch	Dr. Johnson	
1984	The Shooting Party	Tom Harker	
1986	Heavenly Pursuits	TV News Commentator	
1986	The Whistle Blower	Bruce	

== Television credits ==
Year	Title	Role	Notes
1953	The Quatermass Experiment	Television Director	Episode: "Contact Has Been Established"
1955, 1959	BBC Sunday Night Theatre	John Shand/Dr. Neil McCulloch	2 episodes
1956	Rheingold Theatre	Angus	Episode: "Winning Sequence"
1958	The Adventures of Robin Hood	Andrew	Episode: "The Profiteer"
1958	ITV Play of the Week	Flight Lieutenant Roddy Macintyre RAF	Episode: "No Medals"
1959	The Vise	Sims	Episode: "The Penny Black"
1959	ITV Television Playhouse	Smith	Episode: "Oggie"
1959	Dial 999	Ted Morgan	Episode: "Down to the Sea"
1960, 1973	Armchair Theatre	The Officer/Major Browne	2 episodes
1962	Ghost Squad	Mike Ferrers	Episode: "The Golden Silence"
1963	Suspense	Steven Grainger	Episode: "One Step from the Pavement"
1963	BBC Sunday-Night Play	Kenneth Scoones	Episode: "The Bergonzi Hand"
1965	Gideon C.I.D.	Sgt. McKinnon	Episode: "The Thin Red Line"
1965	The Avengers	Ian D'eath	Episode: "Castle D'eath"
1966	Dr. Finlay's Casebook	Davie Todd	Episode: "The Seniority Rule"
1966	This Man Craig	Kenneth Woodburn	Episode: "Old Flame"
1966	The Troubleshooters	Alan Prescott	Episode: "Happy Landings"
1967	Drama 61-67	Philip	Episode: "Myopia"
1968	Mystery and Imagination	Gayton	Episode: "Casting the Runes"
1968	Theatre 625	Father Joseph	Episode: "Wind Versus Polygamy"
1969	Detective	Tommy Rankin	Episode: "The Singing Sands"
1971	Lollipop Loves Mr Mole	Dr. McGregor	Episode: "Doctor Fruit Cake"
1971–1975	Upstairs, Downstairs	Mr. Angus Hudson	60 episodes
1972	The Befrienders	DI Calder	Episode: "Hunted"
1972	Budgie	Soapy Simon	Episode: "And the Lord Taketh Away"
1975	The Morecambe and Wise Show	The Butler	Christmas Special
1976	Hadleigh	Alan Mannett	Episode: "Favours"
1977	Spectre	Inspector Cabell	TV film
1977	Supernatural	Harold Lawrence	Episode: "Night of the Marionettes"
1977–1983	The Professionals	George Cowley	
1981	A Town Like Alice	Noel Strachan	3 episodes
1983	Hart to Hart	Sir William Belgrave	Episode: "Harts and Hounds"
1984	The Masks of Death	Angus Macdonald	TV film
1986	My Brother Tom	Lockie McGibbon	Miniseries; 2 episodes
1986	Shaka Zulu	Professor Bramston	Miniseries
1989	Campion	Professor Gardner Cairey	Serial: "Look to the Lady"
1989	Theatre Night	Arthur Winslow	Episode: "The Winslow Boy"
1991	The Play on One	Jessop Brown	Episode: "Effie's Burning" (aired posthumously)

== Theatre ==
Year	Title	Role	Notes
1950-1954	Seagulls Over Sorrento	Able Seaman McIntosh ("Haggis") (replacement)	Apollo Theatre, Duchess Theatre and other locations
1960	Serjeant Musgrave’s Dance		Crescent Theatre
1961	Saint's Day		Crescent Theatre
1966	Macbeth	Banquo	Royal Court Theatre
1968	Wise Child	Mr. Brooker	Wyndham's Theatre
1968-1969	This Story of Yours	Baxter	Royal Court Theatre, London and Theatre Royal, Brighton
1969	Hamlet	Horatio	The Roundhouse
1969	A Talent to Amuse	Martin Tickner	Phoenix Theatre, London
1970	Oedipus Rex	Creon	Young Vic, National Theatre
1970	The Soldier's Tale	Narrator	Young Vic, National Theatre
1972	Veterans	Rodney	Royal Court Theatre
1975	Macbeth	Banquo (press night)	Royal Shakespeare Company, Aldwych Theatre
1981	Cards on the Table	Superintendent Battle	Richmond Theatre, Theatre Royal, Brighton, and other locations
