= Angela Baddeley =

English actress (1904–1976)

Angela Baddeley CBE
- Angela Baddeley (1938)
- Born: Madeleine Angela Clinton-Baddeley; 4 July 1904; West Ham, Essex, England
- Died: 22 February 1976 (aged 71); Grayshott, Hampshire, England
- Occupation: Actress

Madeleine Angela Clinton-Baddeley (4 July 1904 – 22 February 1976) was an English stage and television actress, widely remembered for her role as household cook Mrs. Bridges in the period drama Upstairs, Downstairs. Her stage career spanned seven decades.

== Early life and career ==
Madeleine Angela Clinton-Baddeley was born in West Ham, Essex (now London) on 4 July 1904 into a wealthy family; she would later base the character of Mrs. Bridges on one of the cooks her family employed. Her younger sister was actress Hermione Baddeley.

In 1912, Angela and Hermione enrolled as pupils at Margaret Morris's dancing school in Chelsea. Angela described the school as "a wonderful foundation for all my work on the stage." In the same year, the eight-year old Angela made her stage début at the Dalston Palace of Varieties, Dalston, in a play called The Dawn of Happiness. When she was nine, she auditioned at the Old Vic Theatre. In November 1915 she made her début at the Old Vic in Richard III, and she subsequently appeared in many other Shakespeare plays.

During her teenage years, the "consummate little actress", as a national newspaper had once called her when she was 10, starred in many musicals and pantomimes.

== Career ==
After spending some time in Australia touring Barrie comedies, Baddeley established herself as a popular stage actress. At the beginning of the 1930s she appeared in two films: a Sherlock Holmes tale, The Speckled Band (1931), featuring Raymond Massey as Sir Arthur Conan Doyle's sleuth, and in The Ghost Train (also 1931), a screen version of the successful stage thriller. Throughout the 1940s, she played many strong female roles on stage, including Miss Prue in Love for Love and Catherine Winslow in The Winslow Boy.

Baddeley played the bawd in Tony Richardson's production of Pericles, Prince of Tyre at the Shakespeare Memorial Theatre in 1958. She played Mistress Quickly in several episodes of the BBC Shakespeare history series An Age of Kings (1960), performing with her sister Hermione as Doll Tearsheet. In the original version of the television period drama Upstairs, Downstairs (1971–75) she played Mrs. Kate Bridges, the resident cook at 165 Eaton Place, who, when the series ended, married the butler, Mr. Angus Hudson (Gordon Jackson). A spin-off series featuring the characters' married life failed to materialise due to Baddeley's death. After the series ended, Baddeley replaced Hermione Gingold in the original London production of A Little Night Music.

Baddeley received a CBE in 1975 for "services to the theatre".

== Personal life and death ==
Baddeley briefly 'retired' from acting at the age of 18. Her first marriage, to Stephen Thomas, produced one daughter. On 8 July 1929 she married actor and stage director Glen Byam Shaw; they had two children, a son and a daughter.

She was the grandmother of Charles Hart, lyricist of the Andrew Lloyd Webber musical, The Phantom of the Opera. She was the sister of actress Hermione Baddeley and a half-sister of the clergyman Bill Baddeley.

Baddeley died at Grayshott Hall on 22 February 1976 from epidemic influenza H1N1 (swine flu) aged 71, shortly after Upstairs, Downstairs ended its run.

== Filmography ==
Year	Title	Role	Notes
1931	The Speckled Band	Helen Stonor	
1931	The Ghost Train	Julia Price	
1932	Arms and the Man	Louka	
1934	Those Were the Days	Charlotte Verrinder	
1938	The Citadel		
1948	Quartet	Mrs. Garnet	(segment "The Facts of Life")
1957	No Time for Tears	Mrs. Harris	
1957	Zoo Baby	Mrs. Ramsey	
1962	Heart to Heart	Miss Knott	Television film
1963	Tom Jones	Mrs. Wilkins	
