= History of coal miners =

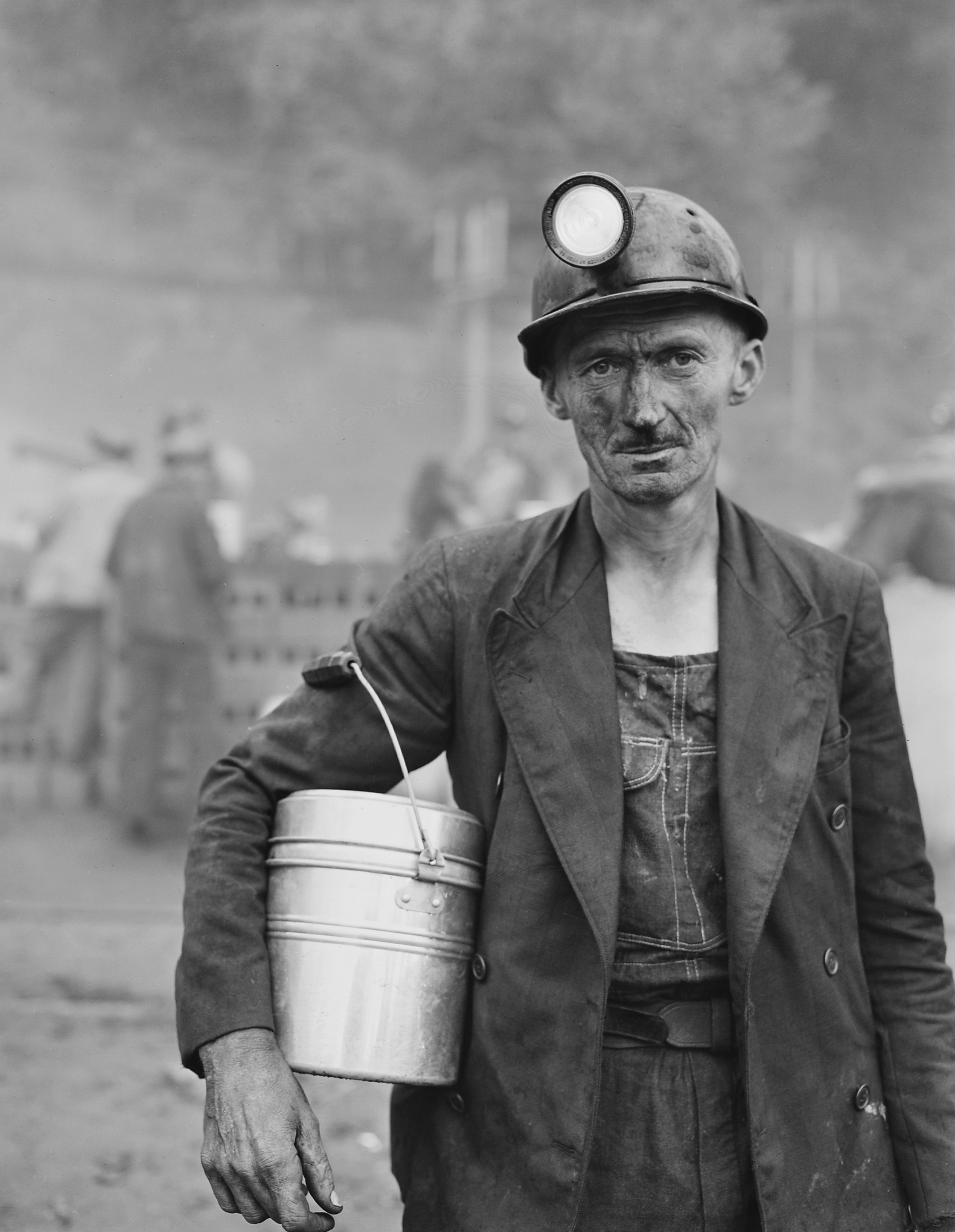
Coal miner in Wheelwright, Kentucky, 1946

People have worked as coal miners for centuries, but the profession became increasingly important during the Industrial Revolution when coal was burned on a large scale to fuel stationary and locomotive engines and to heat buildings. Owing to coal's strategic role as a primary fuel, coal miners have figured strongly in labor and political movements since that time.

After the late-19th century, coal miners in many countries were a frequent presence in industrial disputes with both the management and government. Coal miners' politics, while complex, has occasionally been radical, with a frequent leaning towards far-left political views. A number of far-left political movements have had the support of both coal miners themselves and their trade unions, particularly in Great Britain. In France, on the other hand, coal miners have been much more conservative. In India, Coal Miners Day is celebrated on May 4.

The industry has shifted into developing economies over the course of the twentieth and twenty-first centuries. As of 2024, there are 2.7 million coal miners in the world, according to data from Global Energy Monitor, primarily in China and India.

== Radicalism ==
From the mid-19th century onward, coal miners have often built strong connections with the organized labor movement, and sometimes as well with radical political movements. Coal miners were among the first groups of industrial workers to collectively organize to the protection of both working and social conditions in their communities. Beginning in the 19th century, and continuing through the 20th, coal miners unions became powerful in many countries, the miners becoming leaders of left or socialist movements (as in Britain, Poland, Japan, Canada, Chile and (in the 1930s) in the U.S.) Historians report that, "From the 1880s through the end of the twentieth century, coal miners across the world became one of the most militant segments of the working class in the industrialized world."

The statistics show that from 1889 to 1921 British miners struck between 2 and 3 times more frequently than any other group of workers. Some isolated coal fields had long traditions of militancy and violence; those in Scotland were especially strike-prone. Coal miners formed the core of the political left wing of the Labour Party and the British Communist party.

In Germany, the coal miners demonstrated their militancy through large-scale strikes in 1889, 1905, and 1912. However, in political terms, the German miners were middle-of-the-road and not especially radical. One reason was the formation of different unions—Socialist, liberal, radical, and Polish—that seldom cooperated.

In British Columbia, Canada, the coal miners were "independent, tough, and proud" and became "among the most radical and militant laborers in an extremely polarized province." They were the core of the socialist movement; their strikes were frequent, long, and bitter.

In Chile in the 1930s and 1940s, the miners supported the Communist Party as part of a cross-class alliance that won the presidency in 1938, 1942, and 1946. The long-run political gains were illusory, as a major strike in 1947 was repressed by the military on orders of the president the miners had elected.

In Eastern Europe the coal miners were the most politicized element in society after 1945. They were the primary support group for the Communist governments and were heavily subsidized. Poland's miners were also critical supporters of the anti-Communist Solidarity movement of the 1980s.

== Great Britain ==
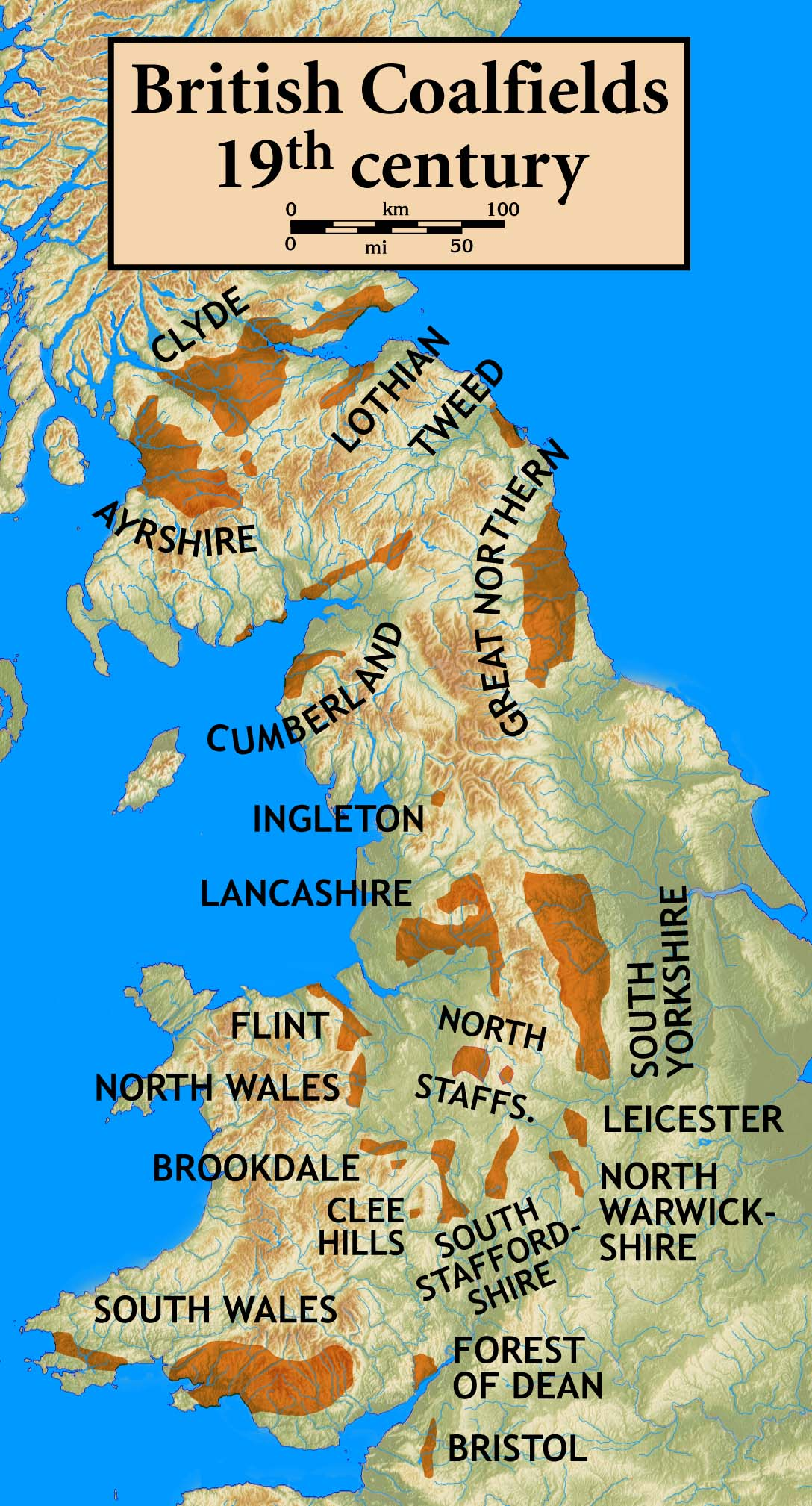
British coalfields in the nineteenth century

=== Pre 1900 ===
Although some deep mining took place as early as the late Tudor period in North East England, and roughly the same time in the Stuart period along the Firth of Forth coast of Scotland, deep shaft mining in Britain began to develop extensively in the late 18th century, with rapid expansion throughout the 19th century and early 20th century when the industry peaked. The location of the coalfields helped to make the prosperity of Lancashire, of Yorkshire, and of South Wales; the Yorkshire pits which supplied Sheffield were only about 300 feet deep. Northumberland and Durham were the leading coal producers and they were the sites of the first deep pits. In much of Britain coal was worked from drift mines, or scraped off when it outcropped on the surface. Small groups of part-time miners used shovels and primitive equipment.

After 1790 output soared, reaching 16 million long tons by 1815. By 1830 this had risen to over 30 million tons The miners, less menaced by imported labor or machines than were the textile workers, had begun to form trade unions and fight their battle for control against the coal owners and royalty-lessees. In South Wales, the miners showed a high degree of solidarity. They lived in isolated villages where the miners comprised the great majority of workers. There was a high degree of equality in lifestyle; combined with an evangelical religious style based on Methodism this led to an ideology of equalitarianism. They forged a "community of solidarity" – under the leadership of the Miners Federation. The union supported first the Liberal Party, then after 1918 Labour, with some Communist Party activism at the fringes.

=== 20th century ===
As well as energy supply, coal became a very political issue, due to the conditions under which colliers worked. Their dominance in remote villages heightened political and industrial solidarily, colliery owners. Much of the 'old Left' of British politics can trace its origins to coal-mining areas, with the main trade union being the Miners' Federation of Great Britain (MFGB), founded in 1888. The MFGB claimed 600,000 members in 1908. (The MFGB later became the more centralised National Union of Mineworkers).

The national coal strike of 1912 was the first national strike by coal miners in Britain. Its main goal of securing a minimum wage. After a million men had walked out for 37 days, the UK Government intervened and ended the strike by passing a minimum wage law. This caused many problems with ships due to the shortage of fuel. As a result, many transatlantic crossings were cancelled and in some cases, passengers were transferred to the Titanic.

=== 1920–45 ===
Total coal output in Britain had been falling since 1914.

- The fall in coal prices resulted from the re-entry in 1925 of Germany to the international coal market by exporting "free coal" to France and Italy as part of their reparations for the First World War.
- The reintroduction of the gold standard in 1925 made the British pound too strong for effective exporting to take place from Britain, and also (because of the economic processes involved in maintaining a strong currency) raised interest rates, hurting all businesses.
- Mine owners wanted to normalize profits even during times of economic instability, which often took the form of wage reductions for miners in their employ. Coupled with the prospect of longer working hours, the industry was thrown into disarray.
- The miners' pay had gone down from £6.00 to £3.90 in the space of seven years.

Mine owners announced their intention to reduce miners' wages. The MFGB rejected the terms: "Not a penny off the pay, not a minute on the day." The TUC responded to this news by promising to support the miners in their dispute. The Conservative government under Stanley Baldwin decided to intervene, declaring that they would provide a nine-month subsidy to maintain the miners' wages and that a royal commission under the chairmanship of Sir Herbert Samuel would look into the problems of the mining industry.

This decision became known as "Red Friday" because it was seen as a victory for working-class solidarity and Socialism. In practice, the subsidy gave the mine owners and the government time to prepare for a major labor dispute. Herbert Smith (a leader of the Miners' Federation) said of this event: "We have no need to glorify about victory. It is only an armistice."

The Samuel Commission published a report on 10 March 1926 recommending that in the future, national agreements, the nationalization of royalties, and sweeping reorganization and improvement should be considered for the mining industry. It also recommended a reduction of 13.5% of miners' wages along with the withdrawal of the government subsidy. Two weeks later, the prime minister announced that the government would accept the report provided other parties also did. A previous royal commission, the Sankey Commission in 1919, had failed to reach an agreement, producing four different reports with proposals ranging from complete restoration of private ownership and control, to complete nationalization. David Lloyd George, the then prime minister, offered reorganization, which was rejected by the miners.

After the Samuel Commission's report, the mine owners declared that, on penalty of a lockout from 1 May, miners would have to accept new terms of employment that included lengthening the work day and reducing wages between 10% and 25%, depending on various factors. The MFGB refused the wage reduction and regional negotiation.

The 1926 United Kingdom general strike was a general strike that lasted nine days, from 4 May 1926 to 13 May 1926. It was called by the Trades Union Congress (TUC) in an unsuccessful attempt to force the British government to act to prevent wage reduction and worsening conditions for 800,000 locked-out coal miners. Some 1.7 million workers went out, especially in transport and heavy industry. The government was prepared and enlisted middle-class volunteers to maintain essential services. There was little violence and the TUC gave up in defeat. The miners gained nothing. In the long run, there was little impact on trade-union activity or industrial relations.

The miners maintained resistance for a few months before being forced by their own economic needs to return to the mines. By the end of November most miners were back at work. However, many remained unemployed for many years. Those that were employed were forced to accept longer hours, lower wages, and district wage agreements. The strikers felt as though they had achieved nothing. The effect on the British coal-mining industry was profound. By the late 1930s, employment in mining had fallen by more than one-third from its pre-strike peak of 1.2 million miners, but productivity had rebounded from under 200 tons produced per miner to over 300 tons by the outbreak in 1939 of the Second World War.

=== Since 1945 ===
All the coal mines in Britain were purchased by the government in 1947 and put under the control of the National Coal Board (NCB). But the industry declined steadily despite protests such as the UK miners' strike (1984–1985). The 1980s and 1990s saw much change in the coal industry, with privatisation, the industry contracting, in some areas quite drastically.Many pits were considered uneconomic to work at then current wage rates compared to cheap North Sea oil and gas, and in comparison to subsidy levels in Europe.

The NCB employed over 700,000 people in 1950 and 634,000 in 1960, but successive governments reduced the size of the industry by closing geographically impaired or low productivity pits. Closures were originally concentrated in Scotland, but then moved into North East England, Lancashire, and South Wales in the 1970s. Closures in all coalfields began in the 1980s as demasnd for British coal was weakened by large subsidies that other European governments gave to their coal industries (West Germany subsidised coal by four times as much and France by three times as much in 1984) and the availability of lower cost, often open-cast, coal mined in Australia, Colombia, Poland and the United States.

The NCB saw three major national strikes. The 1972 and 1974 strikes were both over pay and both saw success for the National Union of Mineworkers. The miners' strike of 1984–1985 ended in victory for the Conservative government of Margaret Thatcher and is still bitterly resented in some parts of Britain that suffered from the aftermath of pit closures. In popular culture this is reflected in Billy Elliot the Musical, a hit play based on the 2000 film Billy Elliot, set in County Durham. The historian Ryan Driskell Tate, who grew up in County Durham, describes the Durham Miner's Gala, an annual trade union event, as "a serious political gathering" for much of its history "forgoing the carnival buzz" until the "strike victories in 1972 and 1974 promoted a more jovial atmosphere," which continues to this day in a celebration of working class and mining heritage.

British Coal (the new name for the national Coal Board), was privatised by selling off a large number of pits to private concerns through the mid-1990s. Because of exhausted seams and high prices the mining industry disappeared almost completely, despite the militant protests of some miners.

In 2008, the South Wales Valleys last deep pit mine closed with the loss of 120 jobs. The coal was exhausted. British coal mines employed only 4,000 workers at 30 locations in 2013, extracting 13 million tonnes of coal.

== West Europe ==
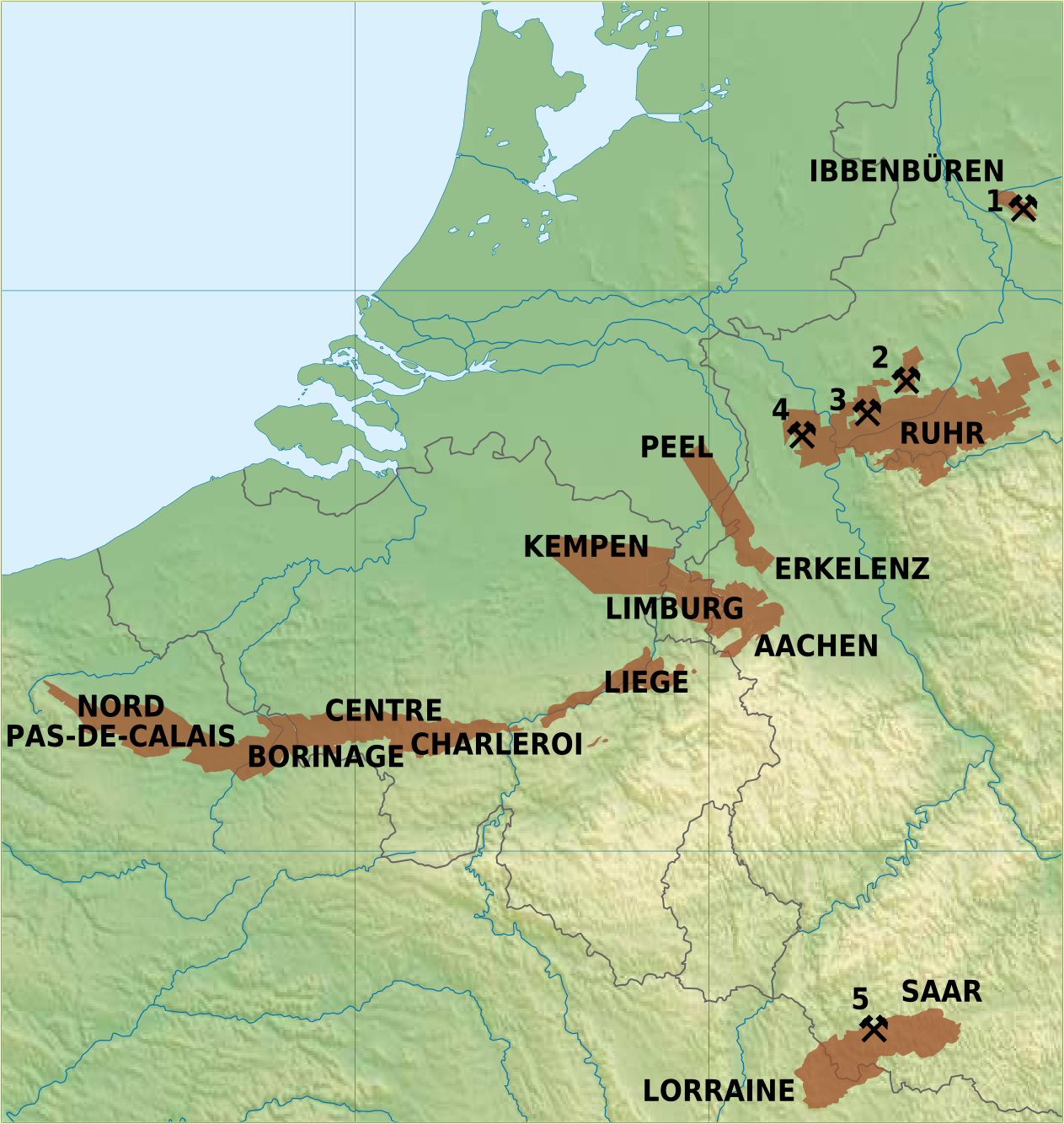
Historical coalfields of Western Germany, Belgium, the Netherlands and Northern France

=== Belgium ===
Belgium took the lead in the industrial revolution on the continent, and began large scale coal mining operations by the 1820s using British made methods. Industrialisation took place in Wallonia (French speaking southern Belgium), starting in the middle of the 1820s, and especially after 1830. The availability of cheap coal was a main factor that attracted entrepreneurs. Numerous works comprising coke blast furnaces as well as puddling and rolling mills were built in the coal mining areas around Liège and Charleroi. The leading entrepreneur was a transplanted Englishman John Cockerill. His factories at Seraing integrated all stages of production, from engineering to the supply of raw materials, as early as 1825. By 1830 when iron became important the Belgium coal industry had long been established, and used steam-engines for pumping. Coal was sold to local mills and railways as well as to France and Prussia.

=== Germany ===
The first important German mines appeared in the 1750s, in the valleys of the rivers Ruhr, Inde and Wurm where coal seams outcropped and horizontal adit mining was possible. After 1815 entrepreneurs in Belgium launched the Industrial Revolution on the Continent by opening mines and associated iron smelters. In Germany (Prussia), the Ruhr Area coalfields opened in the 1830s. Railroads were built around 1850 and numerous small industrial centres sprang up, focused on ironworks, using local coal. The average output of a mine in 1850 was about 8,500 short tons; its employment about 64. By 1900, the average mine's output had risen to 280,000 and the employment to about 1,400. The miners in the German areas were divided by ethnicity (with Germans and Poles), by religion (Protestants and Catholics) and by politics (Socialist, liberal and Communist). Mobility in and out of the mining camps to nearby industrial areas was high. The miners split into several unions, with an affiliation to a political party. As a result, the socialist union (affiliated with the Social Democratic Party) competed with Catholic and Communist unions until 1933, when the Nazis took over all of them. After 1945 the socialists came to the fore.

=== Netherlands ===
Until the middle of the 19th century coal mining in the Netherlands was limited to the direct surroundings of Kerkrade. The use of steam engines enabled exploitation of deeper lying coal seams to the west. Until 1800 mineworkers were organised in small companies who exploited a seam. In the twentieth century the mining companies grew big. The Roman Catholic church actively engaged through Henricus Andreas Poels in the creation of a Roman Catholic miners trade union, to prevent the growing influence of socialism. Starting in 1965 coal mines were dismantled, initiated by social democrat minister Joop den Uyl and with active support of the catholic trade union leader Frans Dohmen. In 1974 the last coal mine was closed, which led to large unemployment in the region.

=== France ===
French miners were slow to organize themselves. When they did organize, they avoided strikes if possible. They placed their faith in the national government to improve their lot through special legislation, and were careful to be moderate. Miner organizations were torn by internal difficulties, but they were all hostile to using strikes. The 1830s saw strikes, but they were not sponsored by the labor unions; rather they were spontaneous complaints against the unity of the owners. Zeldin says, "The miners were clearly backward looking, yearning nostalgically for the days of the small un-mechanized mines, run not by distant engineers but by gang leaders chosen of the men themselves." It was a failed strike in 1869 that undermined one new union. Union leadership insisted the best policy was to seek gradual improvements through lobbying for national legislation. By 1897 there were numerous very small independent mining unions, that together comprised only a small fraction of the miners. When new mines opened up in the Nord and Pas-de-Calais, leadership passed to their unions, which also pursued a moderate policy.

== United States ==
=== Coal mining in the 19th century ===
Miners in remote coal camps were often dependent upon the company store, a store that miners had to use because they were often paid only in company scrip or coal scrip, redeemable at the store, which often charged higher prices than other stores. Many miners' homes were also owned by the mines. Although there were company towns that raised the prices of all goods and made eviction a constant threat, these conditions were not the norm for all coal towns—some owners were paternalistic and others were exploitative.

==== Social structure ====
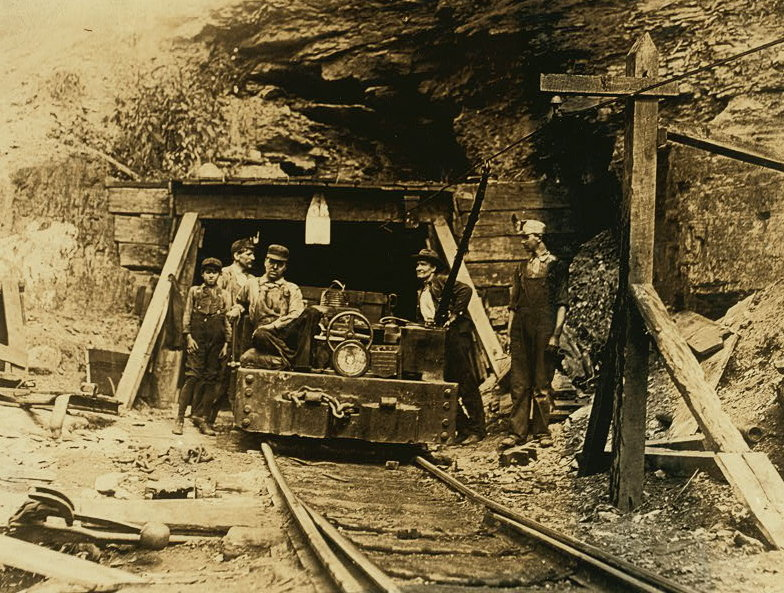
A small local mine in West Virginia, 1908

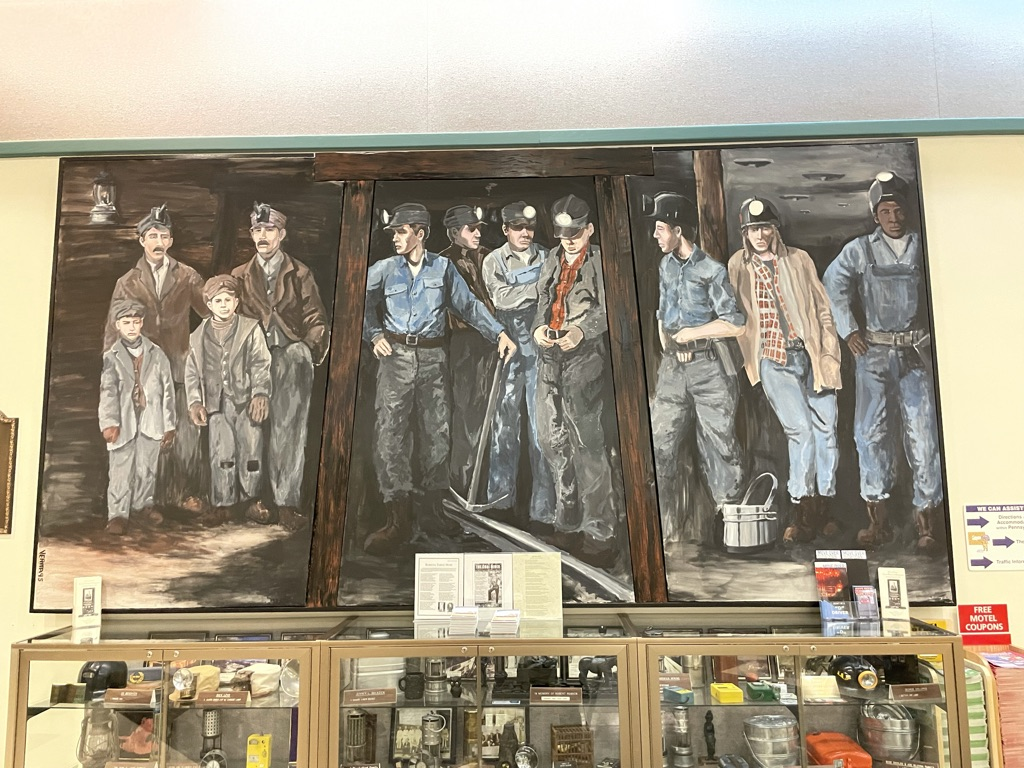
Tribute to coal miners in Pennsylvania.

Coal was typically mined in remote areas, often mountainous. The miners lived in crude housing provided at low cost by the companies, and shopped in company stores. There were few amenities, and few alternative industries besides the railroads and saloons. The anthracite mines of Pennsylvania were owned by large railroads, and managed by bureaucrats. Scranton was at the center. Bituminous mines were locally owned. The social system revolved not so much on occupation (nearly all inhabitants were blue collar workers with similar incomes) but on ethnicity. Welsh and English miners had the highest prestige and the best jobs, followed by the Irish. At a lower status stood recent immigrants from Italy and Eastern Europe; recent arrivals from the Appalachian hills were lower status. The ethnic groups would stick together, seldom mingling. Blacks were sometimes brought in as strike breakers. There was little machinery apart from the railroad. Before mechanization began about 1910 the miners relied on brute force, pick-axe, hand drills and dynamite to smash lumps of coal out of the wall, and shovel them into mule-drawn carts that hauled it to the weighing station, and the railroad cars. The culture held physical courage in high regard. Boxing was the favored sport. Opportunities for women were limited, until textile companies after 1900 started opening small factories in the larger coal towns to employ women. Religion was in high regard, as each group was fiercely loyal to its denomination. Schooling was limited. The aspiration of the boys was to get a job helping around the mines until they were old enough to work underground as "real" miners.

Segundo, Colorado was a company town where the CF&I coal company housed its workers. It offered adequate housing and promoted upward mobility through its sponsorship of a YMCA Center, elementary school, and some small businesses, as well as a company store. However air pollution was a constant health threat; the houses lacked indoor plumbing. As demand for metallurgical coke declined, the mine laid off workers and Segundo's population declined. After a major fire in 1929, CF&I left town and Segundo became practically a ghost town.

==== Company store ====
A company store was typical in more isolated areas. It was company owned and sold a limited range of food, clothing and daily necessities to employees of a company. It is typical of a company town in a remote area where virtually everyone is employed by one firm, such as the coal mine. In a company town, the housing is owned by the company but there may be independent stores there or nearby. Company stores face little or no competition and prices are therefore not competitive. The store typically accepts "scrip" or non-cash vouchers issued by the company in advance of weekly cash paychecks, and gives credit to employees before payday.

Fishback finds that:

The company store is one of the most reviled and misunderstood of economic institutions. In song, folktale, and union rhetoric the company store was often cast as a villain, a collector of souls through perpetual debt peonage. Nicknames, like the "pluck me" and more obscene versions that cannot appear in a family newspaper, seem to point to exploitation. The attitudes carry over into the scholarly literature, which emphasizes that the company store was a monopoly."

The stores served numerous functions, such as a locus for the government post office, and as the cultural, and community center where people could freely gather. Company stores became scarce after the miners bought automobiles and could travel to a range of stores.

==== Safety and health in the mines ====
Being a miner in the 19th century meant long hours of continuous hard labor in the dark mines with low ceilings. Accidents were frequent. Young boys were used outside the mine to sort coal from rocks; they were not allowed underground until age 18.

The breathing of coal dust caused black lung, whose effects few miners knew would have on their bodies.

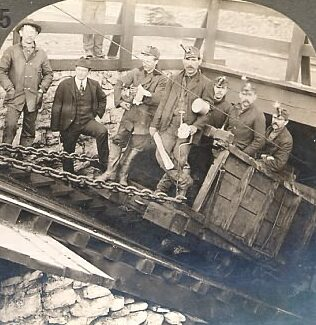
Coal miners at a deep anthracite mine in Hazleton, Pennsylvania, 1900

=== Prosperity 1897–1919 ===
The United Mine Workers (UMWA) had won a sweeping victory in an 1897 strike by the soft-coal (bituminous coal) miners in the Midwest, winning significant wage increases and growing from 10,000 to 115,000 members. The UAW faced much stiffer opposition in the concentration of ownership in the small anthracite region. The owners, controlled by large railroads, refused to meet or to arbitrate with the union; the union struck in September 1900, with results that surprised even the union, as miners of all different nationalities walked out in support of the union.

In the Coal Strike of 1902 the UMW targeted the anthracite coal fields of eastern Pennsylvania. Miners were on strike asking for higher wages, shorter workdays and the recognition of their union. The strike threatened to shut down the winter fuel supply to all major cities (homes and apartments were heated with anthracite or "hard" coal because it had higher heat value and less smoke than "soft" or bituminous coal). President Theodore Roosevelt became involved and set up a fact-finding commission that suspended the strike. The strike never resumed, as the miners received more pay for fewer hours; the owners got a higher price for coal, and did not recognize the union as a bargaining agent. It was the first labor episode in which the federal government intervened as a neutral arbitrator.

Between 1898 and 1908 the wages of coal miners, both in the bituminous and anthracite districts had doubled. Business leaders, led by the National Civic Federation, and political leaders such as Mark Hanna worked with the miners union on favorable terms. Nash notes that the coal operators saw that it was to the advantage to support the union policy of uniform wage rates, for it prevented cutthroat competition and falling prices. The UMW limited the propensity of miners to go on wildcat strikes.

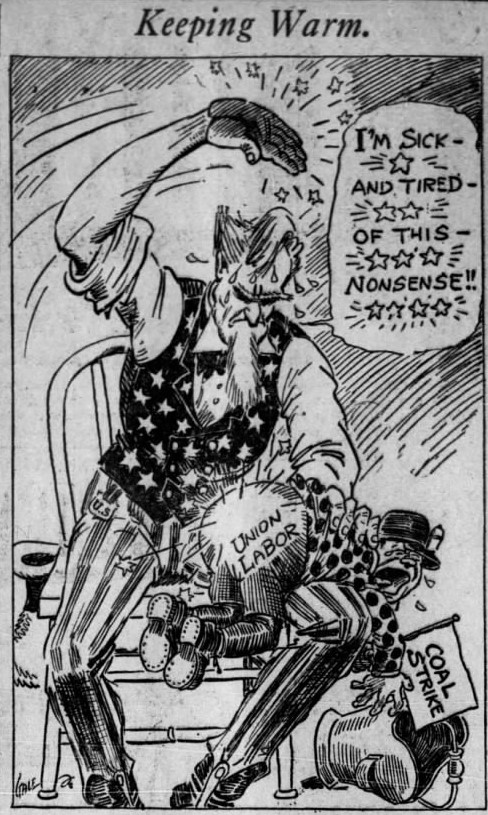
The Los Angeles Times demands federal action to stop the coal strike, November 22, 1919

The UMW under its new young leader John L. Lewis called a strike for November 1, 1919 in all soft (bituminous) coal fields. They had agreed to a wage agreement to run until the end of World War I and now sought to capture some of their industry's wartime gains. The Federal government invoked the wartime measure that made it a crime to interfere with the production or transportation of necessities. Ignoring the court order 400,000 coal workers walked out. The coal operators played the radical card, saying Lenin and Trotsky had ordered the strike and were financing it, and some of the press echoed that language.

Lewis, facing criminal charges and sensitive to the propaganda campaign, withdrew his strike call. Lewis did not fully control the faction-ridden UAW and many locals ignored his call. As the strike dragged on into its third week, supplies of the nation's main fuel were running low and the public called for ever stronger government action. Final agreement came after five weeks with the miners getting a 14% raise, far less than they wanted.

The UMW was weakened by internal factionalism in the 1920s and lost members. Oil was replacing coal as the nation's main energy source and the industry was threatened. The number of coal miners nationwide fell from a peak of 694,000 in 1919 to 602,000 in 1929, and fell sharply to 454,000 in 1939 and 170,000 in 1959.

== Canada ==
Between 1917 and 1926 Cape Breton coal towns changed from company towns to labor towns, reflecting a change in the local balance of power. The main union, the Amalgamated Mine Workers of Nova Scotia, started in 1917 and won union recognition, wage increases, and the eight-hour day. The union mobilized its voters and took control of town councils. They challenged coal companies on the use of company police and assessment of taxes. The most dramatic change was the town council's success in restricting the authority of the company police, who had often served as special, unpaid town police officers. The town councils also intervened in the strife of the 1920s, assisting the miners against the British Empire Steel Corporation's wage-cutting.

The Amalgamated became Communist-led in the 1930s and promoted militancy, extreme rank-and-file democracy and radical resistance to company demands for wage cuts. During the Second World War, after the Soviet Union was invaded by Germany in 1941 the union overnight became intense supporters of the war effort, and maximum output of coal. The rank and file miners, however, were primarily interested in regaining lost income, and began slow-downs to force the company to pay higher wages. When wages did go up, output fell as absenteeism increased and the younger men left for better-paying factory jobs, and the remaining men resisted any speedup. The union leaders were unable to control a dissatisfied and militant work force, as the miners fought both the company and their own union leaders.

The political unity and radicalism of coal miners has traditionally been explained in terms of the isolation of a homogeneous mass of workers in conditions of economic and cultural deprivation. However local studies in Nova Scotia show that mechanizing the mines gave miners significant control over underground operations. In addition, the cooperative nature of the work enabled the miners to forge close friendships. By contrast in another coalfield, where miners were largely unskilled, owners could replace men easily and undermine the unions.

Women played an important, though quiet, role in support of the union movement in coal towns in Nova Scotia, Canada during the troubled 1920s and 1930s. They never worked for the mines but provided psychological support especially during strikes when the pay packets did not arrive. They were the family financiers and encouraged other wives who otherwise might have coaxed their menfolk to accept company terms. Women's labor leagues organized a variety of social, educational, and fund-raising functions. Women also violently confronted "scabs, policemen, and soldiers. They had to stretch the food dollar and show inventiveness in clothing their families.

== Disasters ==
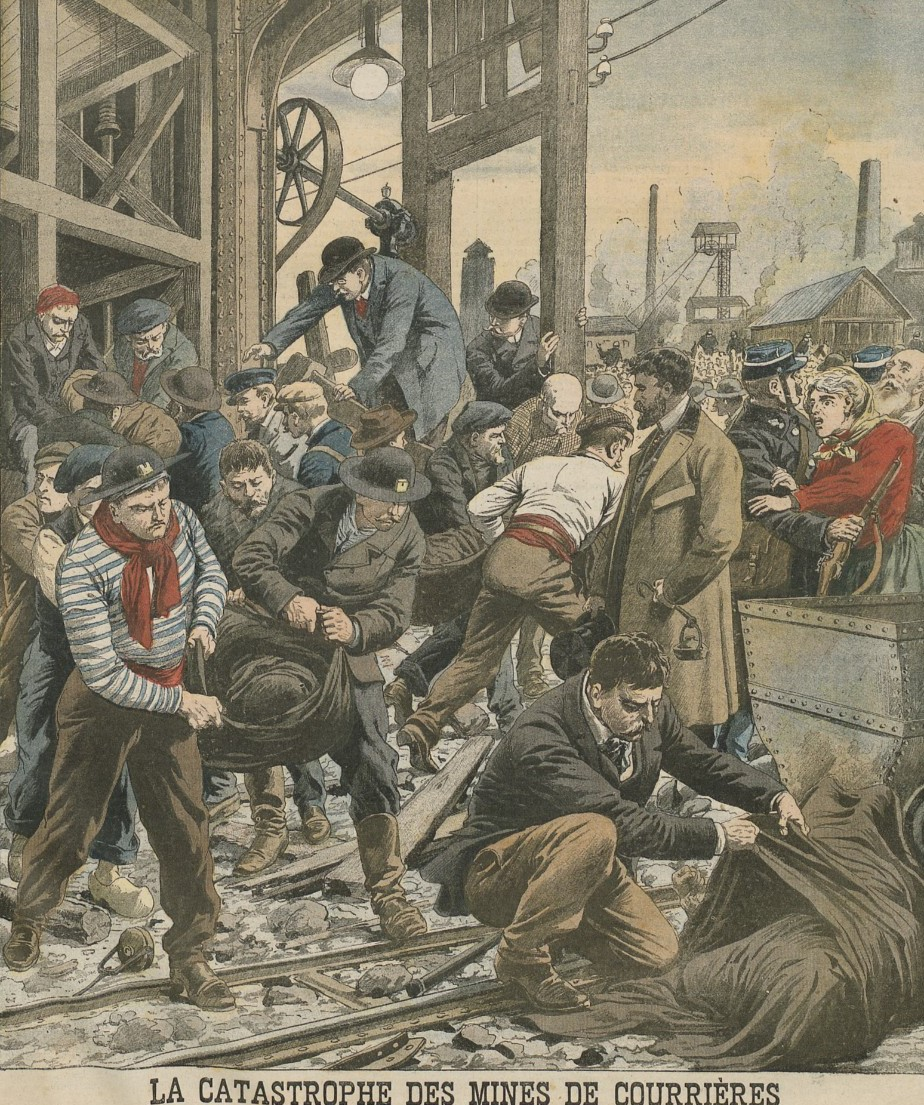
The 1906 Courrières mine disaster in France

Mining has always been dangerous, because of methane gas explosions, roof cave-ins, and the difficulty of mines rescue. The worst single disaster in British coal mining history was at Senghenydd in the South Wales coalfield. On the morning of 14 October 1913 an explosion and subsequent fire killed 436 men and boys. It followed a series of many extensive Mining accidents such as The Oaks explosion of 1866 and the Hartley Colliery Disaster of 1862. Most of the explosions were caused by firedamp ignitions followed by coal dust explosions. Deaths were mainly caused by carbon monoxide poisoning or asphyxiation.

The Courrières mine disaster, Europe's worst mining accident, caused the death of 1,099 miners in Northern France on 10 March 1906. This disaster was surpassed only by the Benxihu Colliery accident in China on April 26, 1942, which killed 1,549 miners.

As well as disasters directly affecting mines, there have been disasters attributable to the impact of mining on the surrounding landscapes and communities. The Aberfan disaster which destroyed a school in South Wales can be directly attributed to the collapse of spoil heaps from the town's colliery past.

Often the victims were memorialized by songs. For example, at least 11 folk songs were composed about the 1956 and 1958 disasters at Springhill, Nova Scotia, that involved 301 miners (113 died and 188 were rescued). Also, the songs "Trip to Hyden", "The Hyden Miners' Tragedy", and "The Caves of Jericho" were written to memorialize the Hurricane Creek mine disaster.

== See also ==
- History of coal mining
- Coal
- Coal mining
- Coal-mining region

=== Britain ===
- Coal mining in the United Kingdom
- 1926 United Kingdom general strike
- South Wales Miners' Federation
- National Union of Mineworkers (Great Britain)
- Midland Counties Miners' Federation
- Northumberland Miners' Association
- Leicestershire Miners' Association
- Thomas Ashton (trade unionist)

=== Czechoslovakia ===
- Mine workers council elections in the First Czechoslovak Republic

=== India ===
- List of trade unions in the Singareni coal fields

=== United States and Canada ===
- Canadian Mineworkers Union
- Cape Breton coal strike of 1981, Canada
- John L. Lewis, American leader 1920–60
- United Mine Workers, U.S. union
- Mary Harris Jones, (Mother Jones), Labor leader
- Coal mining in Plymouth, Pennsylvania
- Hurricane Creek mine disaster
