= The Nine Days Wonder =

- Upstairs, Downstairs episode
- Episode no.: Season 5 Episode 9
- Directed by: Simon Langton
- Written by: Jeremy Paul
- Production code: 9
- Original air date: 2 November 1975

Episode chronology
← Previous "Such a Lovely Man"	Next → "The Understudy"

"The Nine Days Wonder" is the ninth episode of the fifth and final series of the period drama Upstairs, Downstairs. It first aired on 2 November 1975 on ITV.

== Background ==
"The Nine Days Wonder" was recorded in the studio on 1 and 2 May 1975. The location footage was filmed on 22 April in Eaton Place in Belgravia, and in nearby Theed Street. The director of the episode, Simon Langton, was the son of David Langton, who played Richard Bellamy.

== Plot ==
"The Nine Days Wonder" opens on 1 May 1926. Two days later, the General Strike is called. Virginia is in Scotland, and unable to return because of the strike, while Mrs Bridges is in Felixstowe on holiday. She telephones 165 Eaton Place, worried about food shortages, and unknown to anyone else, orders some food to be delivered to Eaton Place. Hudson gets permission from Richard to volunteer as a Special Constable, as he had during World War I. At the start of the strike, Edward is attacked by a striker while out in the car fetching milk.

Georgina and her circle of friends see the event as a chance to have fun by volunteering to drive buses or trains. She delivers copies of the government-issued British Gazette. James takes it far more seriously in political terms, but volunteers to drive a bus with Frederick along as an unofficial special constable. On one journey, they encounter a group of strikers who block the road. The bus conductor is university student Andrew Bouverie. When Bouverie is at Eaton Place during a break, he remembers having briefly met Georgina at a party, and drops hints about not having anywhere nice to stay. However, Lady Prudence offers him a bed in her house, as she has decided to help out by becoming a "landlord", with two university students already staying.

Ruby's uncle Len Finch comes from Barnsley with a friend, Arnold Thompson. Both are in London for a union meeting. They take tea in the servants' hall, when Mr. Hudson is out, and Thompson gives Edward, who is sympathetic to the strikers, a copy of the British Worker newspaper. When Hudson comes back and finds the newspaper, he tears it up. On 12 May, minutes after the strike is called off, Finch and Thompson arrive to say goodbye to Ruby. When told of the ending of the strike, they both leave deflated.

== Cast ==
- Simon Williams as James Bellamy
- Gordon Jackson as Hudson
- Jean Marsh as Rose
- David Langton as Richard Bellamy
- Joan Benham as Lady Prudence Fairfax
- Lesley-Anne Down as Georgina Worsley
- Christopher Beeny as Edward
- Gareth Hunt as Frederick
- Jacqueline Tong as Daisy
- Jenny Tomasin as Ruby
- Martin Wimbush as Andrew Bouverie
- Tommy Wright as Picket Leader
- John Breslin as Len Finch
- Roy Pattison as Arnold Thompson
