= Harold Heslop =

English author, activist, and coalminer

- Born: 1 October 1898; Hunwick, County Durham, England
- Died: 10 November 1983 (aged 85)
- Education: King James I Academy; Central Labour College
- Political party: Independent Labour Party

Harold Heslop (1 October 1898 – 10 November 1983) was an English writer, left-wing political activist, and coalminer, from near Bishop Auckland, County Durham. Heslop's first novel Goaf was published in 1926, but it was in a Russian translation as Pod vlastu uglya and did not appear in England until 1934. In 1929, he also published his first novel in England, The Gate of a Strange Field, about the 1926 United Kingdom general strike. His last novel, The Earth Beneath, was published in 1946.

== Early life and education ==
Heslop was born on 1 October 1898 in the village of Hunwick, near Bishop Auckland, County Durham, to William Heslop, coalminer, and his wife, Isabel (née Whitfield). The Heslops had been miners for several generations. Heslop attended King James I Academy on a scholarship until he was thirteen, when the family moved to Boulby on the north Yorkshire coast. Because his new home was too far from the nearest grammar school, Heslop began working underground at Boulby ironstone mine, where his father was now the manager. Shortly after, his mother died, his father remarried, and the family moved to Northumberland. Heslop then moved to South Shields and started work at Harton colliery, where he remained for eleven years.

After World War I, Heslop became active in left-wing politics as secretary of a local Independent Labour Party branch and represented the miners of Harton colliery on the council of the Durham Miners' Association. In 1923, he won a scholarship to study at the Central Labour College, a British higher education institution supported by trade unions, in London which he attended from 1924 to 1926.

== Career ==
In 1926, Heslop's first novel Goaf was published, but it was in a Russian translation as Pod vlastu uglya and did not appear in England until 1934. This novel, about mining in northern England, "sold half a million copies in Russia and made Heslop's name there", though he was only able to transfer a small part of his royalties to England.

Heslop returned to Harton in 1926, where he unsuccessfully contested a seat on the South Shields Town Council for the Labour Party, sponsored by the Miners Lodge, but because of the contraction of the coal industry he became unemployed and the Heslops moved to London, where he worked at various things. Heslop's political activity included working for the British Communist Party's general secretary, Harry Pollitt against Ramsay MacDonald for the Seaham division of Durham in the 1929 election. In 1929,

he also published his first novel in England, The Gate of a Strange Field, which was about the General Strike of 1926. The following year, another novel Journey Beyond, about unemployment in London, was published. Also in 1930, he was invited to attend the Second Plenum of the International Bureau of Revolutionary Literature in the Soviet Union. Subsequently, four of his novels were published in the Soviet Union, including Red Earth (1931), a utopian novel about a successful revolution in Britain which was never published in the UK. He also worked in London for the Soviet trading mission and later Intourist. In 1934, his novel Goaf was released in English. Heslop also published a detective novel, The Crime of Peter Ropner. In 1935, Last Cage Down was published, and in 1937, under the pseudonym Lincoln J. White, Abdication, was released.

During the war the Heslops evacuated to Taunton in Somerset, where he worked on his most successful novel in Britain, The Earth Beneath which was published in 1946 and sold 9000 copies. Although he continued to write, this was his last novel. While in Somerset Heslop joined the Labour Party and, in 1948, won a seat on the Taunton Town Council; however, he failed in a later attempt to become a Labour Member of Parliament for North Devon, coming third in the 1955 general election.

After Heslop's death in 1983, his complete writings were donated to Durham University.

== Works ==
Heslop's literary career began in 1926 with the Russian version of Goaf and then, starting with The Gate of a Strange Field, Heslop published five novels in England between 1929 and 1946, while his autobiography, Out of the Old Earth, was published posthumously. Harold Heslops's first novel published in England, The Gate of a Strange Field is about the General Strike of 1926, which he had witnessed in London. The novel took its title from a phrase in H. G. Wells' novel Meanwhile. It was generally well-reviewed, The New York Times, for example, commented, that "the sheer honesty of the book makes it powerful", but the critic of The Communist Review found it "full of cliches" and "unending literary jargon" A more recent discussion, however, found that "the most interesting feature of the novel ... is not the study of the labour movement but of the hero's sexual repression".

Heslop's next novel Journey Beyond (1930) deals with the subject of unemployment. In 1934, the original English version of Heslop's novel Goaf was published, as well as The Crime of Peter Ropner, which is an "attempt at a crime novel from a left-wing perspective". Crime novelist Dorothy L. Sayers reviewed it, and while disliking much about it, found that it had "a crude and sordid power". Last Cage Down, set in a coal-field, was released in 1935.

Over ten years after his death, Heslop's autobiography Out of the Old Earth was published, which has been described, as a "rich recollections of childhood in the coalfield, [and] portraits of his family [along with a] fine descriptions of working life above and below ground".

== Personal life ==
On 27 March 1926 Harold Heslop married Phyllis Hannah Varndell, a clerk at Selfridges whose family was active in left-wing politics. Heslop died 10 November 1983.

== Bibliography ==
Published works

- Pod vlastu uglya, translation by Zinaida Vengerova-Minskaia. Moscow: Priboj, 1926.
- The Gate of a Strange Field. London: Brentano, 1929; New York:Appleton, 1929. There was also a Russian translation.
- Journey Beyond. London: H. Shaylor, 1930.
- The Crime of Peter Ropner. London: Fortune Press, 1934.
- Goaf. London: Fortune Press, 1934; published first in 1926 in Russia as Pod vlastu uglya (Under the Sway of Coal)
- Last Cage Down. London: Wishart, 1935; London : Wishart, 1984.
- The Abdication of Edward VIII: A Record With All the Published Documents. (Published under the pseudonym of J. Lincoln White, this was a joint work with Robert Ellis). London: Routledge, 1936.
- The Earth Beneath. London: Boardman, 1946; New York: J. Day Co., 1947.
- Out of the Old Earth (autobiography), ed. Andy Croft and Graeme Rigby. Newcastle upon Tyne: Bloodaxe, 1994.
  - Heslop also published two penny-pamphlets in 1927 attacking the anti-trade union sentiments of the local Northern Press newspapers, Who are your Masters? and Who Are Your Masters Now? No.2. The Northern Press, The Runcimans, and South Shields. South Shields: Harold Heslop,1927, and regular reviews for The Worker c.1929–1932. Heslop also published in other left wing journals such as Left Review, and contributed "short stories and literary criticism to a range of publications, from Labour Monthly to Plebs, the Communist to International Review ".

Secondary sources

- Eichler, Tanja, "Women characters in Harold Heslop's Last Cage Down and Lewis Jones' Cwmardy". In Behrend, Hanna and Neubert, Isolde (eds), Working-class and feminist literature in Britain and Ireland in the 20th century proceedings of the 3rd conference in Berlin, 20 to 22 March 1989. Berlin: Humboldt UP, 1990. 2 vols. (Gesellschaftswissenschaften Studien.) [1997:851997:85]. pp. 17–24.
- Andy Croft, Red Letter Days: British Fiction in the 1930s. London: Lawrence and Wishart, 1990) and
  - "Introduction" to Out of the Old Earth by Harold Heslop, ed. Andy Croft and Graeme Rigby. Newcastle upon Tyne: Bloodaxe, 1994 and
  - "Heslop, Harold (1898–1983)", Oxford Dictionary of National Biography. Oxford: Oxford University Press, 2004. accessed 30 Oct 2012.
- E. Elistratova, "The work of Harold Heslop", International Literature, 1 (1932), pp. 99–102.
- Ian Haywood, Working-Class Fiction from Chartism to Trainspotting. Plymouth: Northcote House, 1997.
- John Fordham, "A Strange Field: Region and Class in the Novels of Harold Heslop" in Intermodernism: Literary Culture in Mid-Twentieth-Century Britain, ed. Kristin Bluemel. Edinburgh: Edinburgh University Press, 2009.
- H. Gustav Klaus, "Harold Heslop: miner novelist", The Literature of Labour: Two Hundred Years of Working-Class Writing. Brighton: Harvester Press, 1985.
- Alick West, "Harold Heslop and The Gate of a Strange Field", Crisis and Criticism. London: Lawrence and Wishart, 1937.

== See also ==
- Social novel
- Proletarian literature
- Welsh literature in English: for Welsh mining novelists
