= 1926 United Kingdom general strike =

Sympathy strike to support miners' negotiations

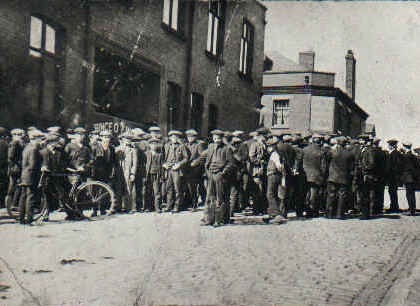
- Tyldesley miners outside the Miners' Hall during the strike
- Date: 4–12 May 1926
- Location: United Kingdom
- Caused by: Mine owners' intention to reduce miners' wages
- Goals: Higher wages and improved working conditions
- Methods: General strike
- Result: Strike called off

Parties
Trades Union Congress: Miners' Federation; Sympathy strikers; Communist Party of Great Britain	Government of the United Kingdom: Conservative Party

Lead figures
Walter Citrine; A. J. Cook; Jessie Eden	Stanley Baldwin

Number
1.5–1.75 million	

A general strike took place in the United Kingdom from 4 to 12 May 1926. It was called by the General Council of the Trades Union Congress (TUC) in an unsuccessful attempt to force the UK government to act to prevent wage reductions and worsening conditions for 1.2 million locked-out coal miners. Some 1.7 million workers went out, especially in transport and heavy industry.

It was a sympathy strike, with many of those who were not miners and not directly affected striking to support the locked-out miners. As well as workplace stoppages, other organisation included Councils of Action, food distribution, and support for picket lines in some places. The government was well prepared, and enlisted middle- and upper-class volunteers to maintain essential services. There was little violence and the TUC gave up in defeat.

== Causes ==
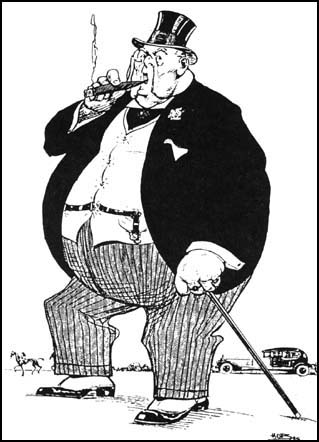
The Subsidised Mineowner—Poor Beggar! from Trade Union Unity Magazine (1925)

From 1914 to 1918, the UK fought in WWI. Heavy use of coal during the war depleted once-rich seams. The 'Peak was 1913 when [the UK was] exporting 100 million tons at a price of around £1 per ton'. In the early 1880s, coal production was at a peak of 310 tons per man annually, but in the four years preceding the war, this amount had fallen to 247 tons. By the 1920–1924 period, this had fallen further to just 199 tons. Total coal output had been in decline since 1914 as well.

In 1924, the Dawes Plan was implemented. It allowed Germany to re-enter the international coal market by exporting "free coal" to France and Italy, as part of their reparations for the war. This extra supply reduced coal prices. In 1925, Winston Churchill, the chancellor of the Exchequer, reintroduced the gold standard. This made the British pound too strong for effective exporting to take place from Britain. Furthermore, because of the economic processes involved in maintaining a strong currency, interest rates were raised, which hurt some businesses.

Mine owners wanted to maintain profits even during times of economic instability, and to do so they reduced wages for miners in their employment. Miners' weekly pay had been lowered from £6 to £3 18s. over seven years. Owners eyed increasing working hours too.

Special Committee of the General Council of the Trades Union Congress at Downing Street, ready to discuss the mining crisis with Baldwin

When mine owners announced their intention to reduce miners' wages further, the Miners' Federation of Great Britain rejected the terms: "Not a penny off the pay, not a minute on the day." The Trades Union Congress responded by promising to support the miners in their dispute. The Conservative government, under Prime Minister Stanley Baldwin, decided to intervene by declaring that a nine-month subsidy would be provided to maintain the miners' wages and that a royal commission, under the chairmanship of Sir Herbert Samuel, would look into the problems of the mining industry and consider its impact on other industries, families, and organisations dependent on coal supply.

The Samuel Commission published its report on 10 March 1926, recommending that national agreements, the nationalisation of royalties, and sweeping reorganisation and improvement should be considered for the mining industry. It also recommended a reduction of 13.5% of miners' wages, along with the withdrawal of the government subsidy. Two weeks later, the prime minister announced that the government would accept the report if other parties also did.

A previous royal commission, the Sankey Commission in 1919, had failed to reach an agreement, producing four different reports with proposals ranging from complete restoration of private ownership and control, to complete nationalisation. David Lloyd George, the then prime minister, offered reorganisation, which was rejected by the miners.

Following the Samuel Commission's report, the mine owners declared that miners would be offered new terms of employment including lengthening the work day and reducing wages depending on various factors. The Miners' Federation of Great Britain refused the wage reduction and regional negotiation.

== General strike, May 1926 ==
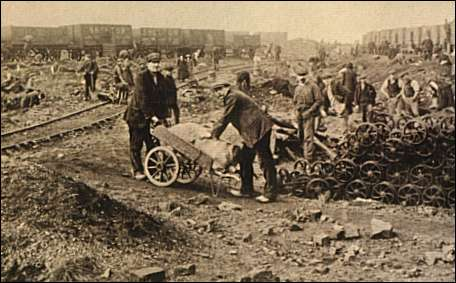
Foraging for coal during the strike

The final negotiations began on 1 May but failed to achieve an agreement, leading to an announcement by the TUC that a general strike "in defence of miners' wages and hours" was scheduled to begin on Monday, 3 May, at one minute to midnight.

The leaders of the Labour Party were troubled about the proposed general strike because they were aware of the revolutionary elements within the union movement and of the damage that they might do to the party's new reputation as a party of government. During the next two days, frantic efforts were made to reach an agreement between the government and the mining industry representatives. However, they failed, mainly because of an eleventh-hour decision by printers of the Daily Mail to refuse to print an editorial ("For King and Country") condemning the general strike. They objected to the following passage: "A general strike is not an industrial dispute. It is a revolutionary move which can only succeed by destroying the government and subverting the rights and liberties of the people". Baldwin was now concerned about the TUC and printers' action interfering with the freedom of the press. King George V tried to stabilise the situation and create balance saying, "Try living on their wages before you judge them."

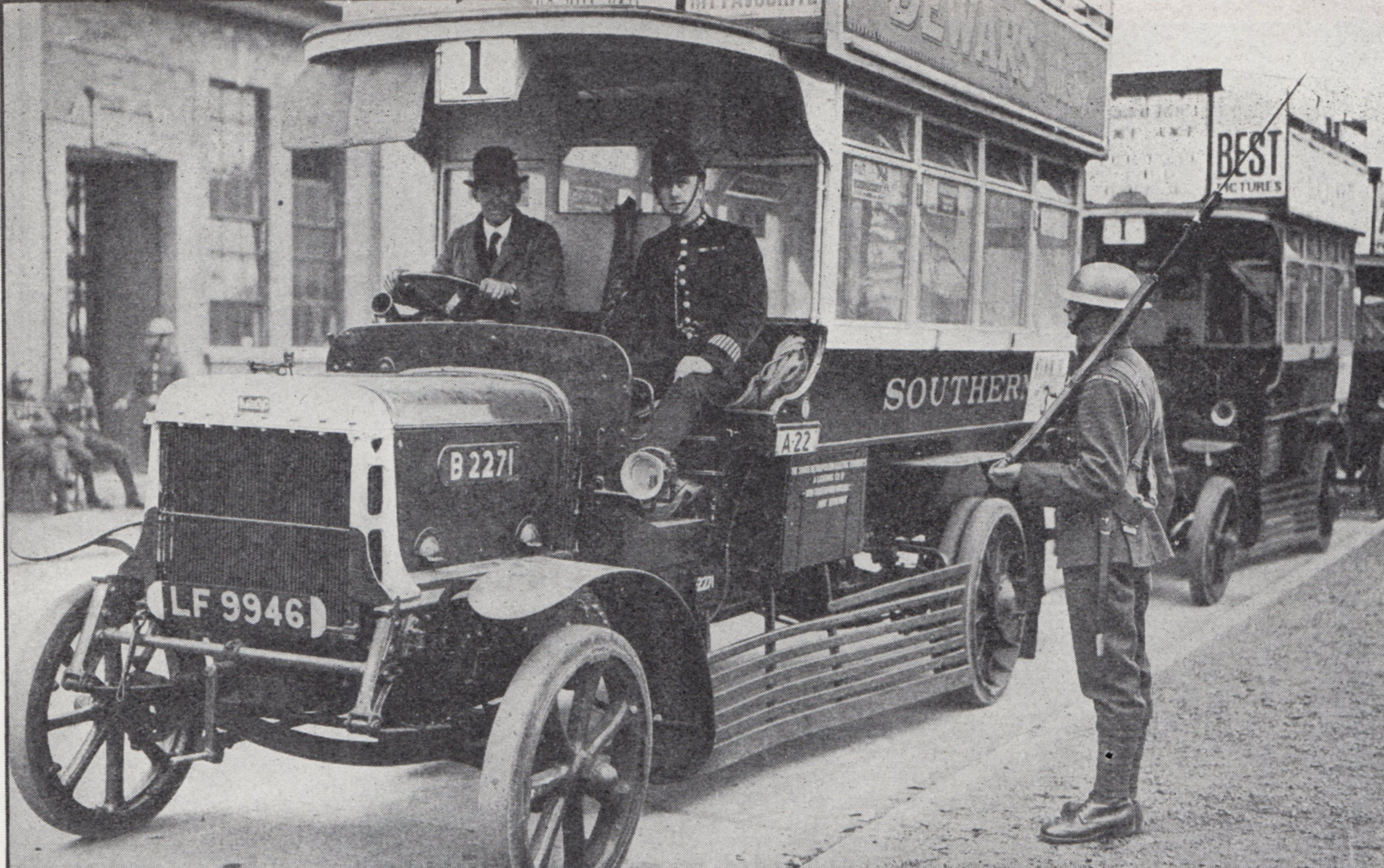
Troops on guard at a bus station; each bus had a police escort during the strike

The Communist Party of Great Britain aided the strikers and distributed manifestos throughout the strike. The TUC feared that an all-out general strike would bring revolutionary elements to the fore and limited the participants to railwaymen, transport workers, printers, dockers, ironworkers, and steelworkers, as they were regarded as pivotal in the dispute. In a rare political radio broadcast, Archbishop Francis Cardinal Bourne, the leading Catholic prelate in Britain, condemned the strike, knowing that many strikers were Catholic. He advised that "It is a direct challenge to lawfully constituted authority. ... All are bound to uphold and assist the Government, which is the lawfully constituted authority of the country and represents therefore ... the authority of God Himself."

The government had been preparing for the strike over the nine months in which it had provided a subsidy by creating organisations such as the Organisation for the Maintenance of Supplies. The government had also stockpiled five months worth of coal reserves, and recruiting many new volunteer special constables. It rallied support by emphasizing the revolutionary nature of the strikers. The armed forces and volunteer workers helped maintain basic services. The government used the Emergency Powers Act 1920 to maintain essential supplies.

On 4 May 1926, the number of workers on strike was estimated at between 1½ million and 1¾ million. There were strikers "from John o' Groats to Land's End". The reaction to the strike call was immediate and overwhelming, surprising both the government and the TUC; the latter not being in control of the strike. Troops were deployed to Canning Town to load lorries in place of striking workers. Police clashed with picketers, injuring multiple strikers.

"Constitutional Government is being attacked. Let all good citizens whose livelihood and labour have thus been put in peril bear with fortitude and patience the hardships with which they have been so suddenly confronted. Stand behind the Government, who are doing their part, confident that you will cooperate in the measures they have undertaken to preserve the liberties and privileges of the people of these islands. The laws of England are the people's birthright. The laws are in your keeping. You have made Parliament their guardian. The General Strike is a challenge to Parliament and is the road to anarchy and ruin".

— Prime Minister Stanley Baldwin, 6 May 1926, British Gazette

On 5 May 1926, both sides gave their views. Churchill commented as editor of the government newspaper British Gazette: "I do not agree that the TUC have as much right as the Government to publish their side of the case and to exhort their followers to continue action. It is a very much more difficult task to feed the nation than it is to wreck it". Baldwin wrote, "The general strike is a challenge to the parliament and is the road to anarchy". The British Worker, the TUC's newspaper, wrote: "We are not making war on the people. We are anxious that the ordinary members of the public shall not be penalized for the unpatriotic conduct of the mine owners and the government". Striking dockworkers in Canning Town overturned several lorries and again clashed with police. Mounted police charged into a crowd of strikers in Poplar. Meetings organized by supporters of the strike in the East End were disrupted by police. Lockmen at the Royal Docks joined the strike. Workers at West Ham Power Station threatened to cut off all power to the area if electricity was used to open the bascule bridge when Navy sailors were deployed to replace Royal Docks workers, forcing the sailors to operate the bridge by hand. Navy submarines were stationed at Royal Docks to supply power to the docks and cold warehouses.

In the meantime, the government put in place a "militia" of special constables called the Organisation for the Maintenance of Supplies (OMS) of volunteers to maintain order in the street. A special constable said: "It was not difficult to understand the strikers' attitude toward us. After a few days I found my sympathy with them rather than with the employers. For one thing, I had never realized the appalling poverty which existed. If I had been aware of all the facts, I should not have joined up as a special constable". It was decided that fascists would not be allowed to enlist in the OMS without first giving up their political beliefs, as the government feared a right-wing backlash so the fascists formed the so-called "Q Division" under Rotha Lintorn-Orman to combat the strikers. Striking workers attempted to convince Royal Marines stationed at Surrey Docks to defect by inviting them to drink at local pubs and distributing communist propaganda. MI5 wrote the effort was "without much result, apart from the consumption of an inordinate amount of beer."

On 6 May 1926, there was a change of atmosphere. The government newspaper, British Gazette, suggested that means of transport into London began to improve compared to the first day with volunteers, car sharing, cyclists, private buses, as well as strikebreakers. A statement on the front page indicated 200 London General Omnibus Company buses 'on the streets'. Only 86 LGOC buses, however, were operating. Workers at a Shell fuel depot in Thames Haven joined the strike. Picketers cut telegraph wires, pulled down fences, and obstructed the road with trees to impede a convoy of special constables traveling to Thames Haven.

On 7 May 1926, the TUC met Samuel and worked out a set of proposals designed to end the dispute. The Miners' Federation rejected the proposals. The British Worker was increasingly difficult to operate, as Churchill had requisitioned the bulk of the supply of the paper's newsprint so it reduced its size from eight pages to four. In the meantime, the government took action to protect the men who decided to return to work.

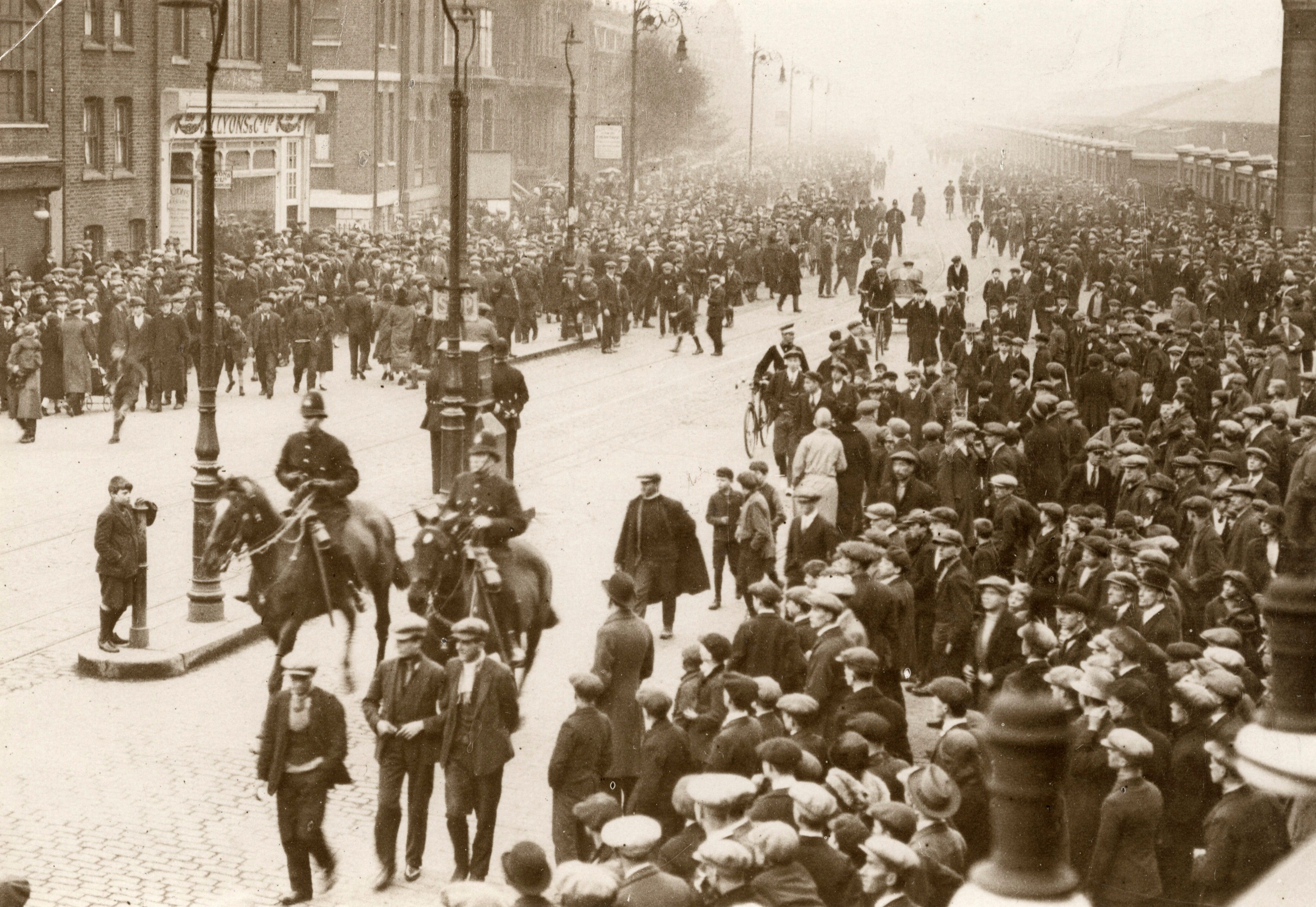
Striking dockworkers in Poplar, London, during the General Strike of May 1926

On 8 May 1926, there was a dramatic moment on the London Docks. Lorries were protected by the Army. They broke the picket line and transported food to Hyde Park. Churchill had wanted, in a move that could have proved unnecessarily antagonistic to the strikers, to arm the soldiers. Baldwin, however, had insisted otherwise. It was the first breaking of the strikers' blockade. In Plymouth, tram services were restarted, with some vehicles attacked and windows smashed. However, not all strike actions in the city were confrontational; a football match, attended by thousands, occurred between a team of policemen and strikers, with the strikers winning 2–0. The supporters included a delegation of 4,000 strikers, which marched to the grounds accompanied by a marching band.

On 9 May 1926, George Kidwell, secretary of the 'San Francisco Bakery Wagon Drivers' Union' sent a cable to Ben Tillett, leader of the dockers union congratulating them and other workers on a 'wonderful demonstration of working-class power'.

On 10 May 1926, the Flying Scotsman was derailed by striking miners at Cramlington, a short distance north of Newcastle upon Tyne. The British Worker, alarmed at the fears of the General Council of the TUC that there was to be a mass drift back to work, claimed: "The number of strikers has not diminished; it is increasing. There are more workers out today than there have been at any moment since the strike began".

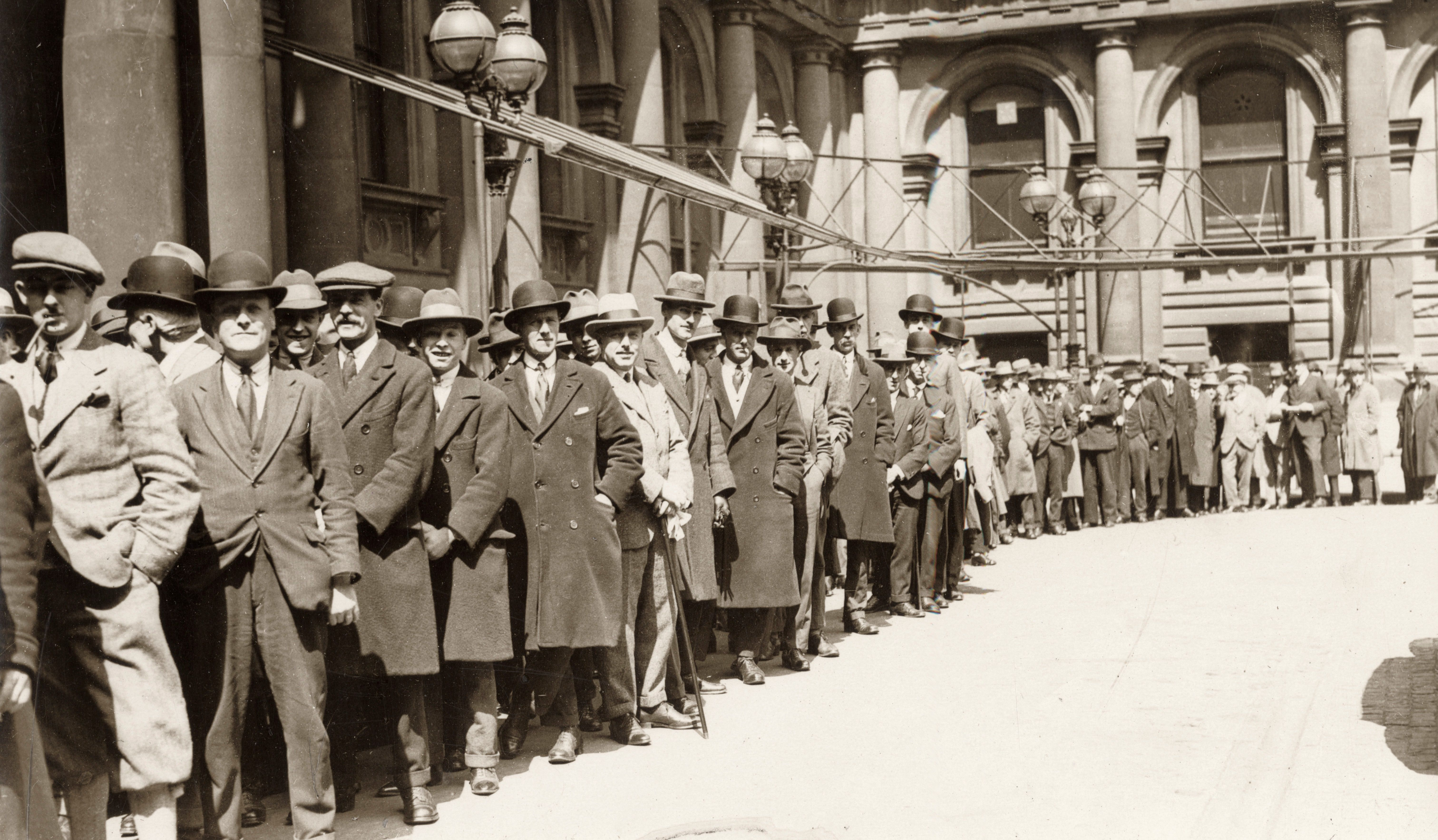
Men registering as volunteers at the Foreign Office

However, the National Sailors' and Firemen's Union applied for an injunction in the Chancery Division of the High Court to enjoin the General-Secretary of its Tower Hill branch from calling its members out on strike. Mr Justice Astbury granted the injunction by ruling that no trade dispute could exist between the TUC and "the government of the nation" and that except for the strike in the coal industry, the general strike was not protected by Trade Disputes Act 1906. In addition, he ruled that the strike in the plaintiff union had been called in contravention of its own rules. As a result, the unions involved became liable, at common law, for incitement to breach of contract and faced potential sequestration of their assets by employers. Over 1,000 strikers and police clashed in Tilbury. Leadership of the National Sailors' and Firemen's Union opposed the strike and worked to break it; members of the Tower Hill and Liverpool branches joined the strike against union leadership.

On 12 May 1926, the TUC General Council visited 10 Downing Street to announce its decision to call off the strike if the proposals worked out by the Samuel Commission were respected and the government offered a guarantee there would be no victimization of strikers. The government stated that it had "no power to compel employers to take back every man who had been on strike". However, the TUC agreed to end the dispute without such an agreement. Various strikes continued after this as their unions negotiated deals with companies for their members to return to work. In the evening in Poplar, strikers and police clashed. Police drove a car through a crowd and crashed into the town hall building. The National Union of Railwaymen office was raided by police, with over 150 people injured. Reverend St John Groser and Poplar mayor Joseph Hammond were assaulted by police.

The TUC's decision to call off the strike unconditionally, without input from those striking or winning any guarantees or improvements, led to criticism and feelings of betrayal from workers and weakened unions, as well as victimization of the strikers as they returned to work.

== Aftermath ==
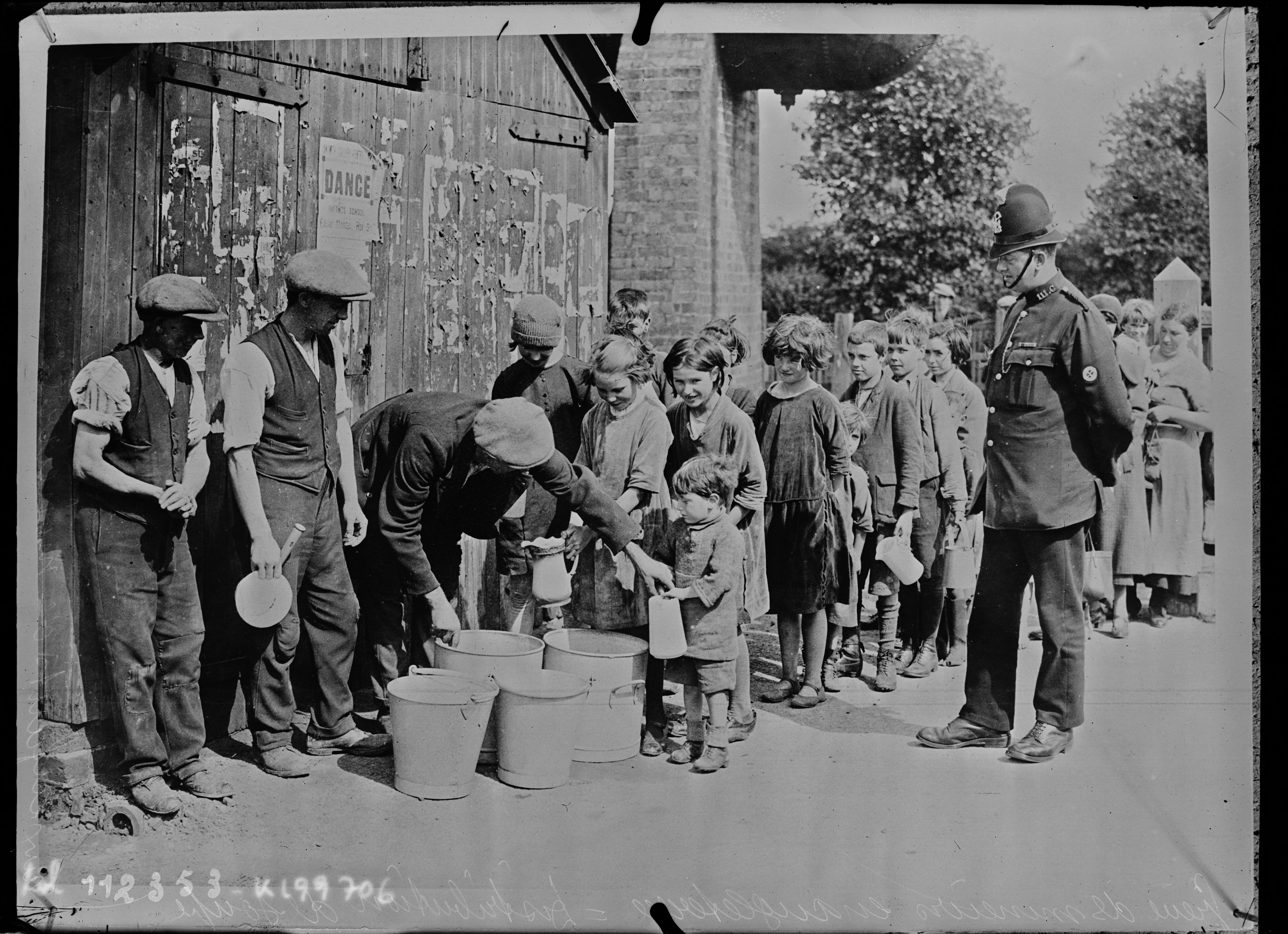
Soup distribution to children of striking miners in England, August 1926

The miners maintained resistance for a few months before being forced by their own economic needs to return to the mines. By the end of November, most miners were back at work. However, many remained unemployed for many years. Those still employed were forced to accept longer hours, lower wages, and district wage agreements.

The effect on British coal mines was profound. By the late 1930s, employment in mining had fallen by more than a third from its pre-strike peak of 1.2 million miners, but productivity had rebounded from under 200 tons produced per miner, to over 300 tons by the outbreak of the Second World War.

The split in the miners that resulted from Spencerism and the agreement of the Nottinghamshire miners to return to work, against the policy of the Miners' Federation of Great Britain, divided the coal miners as a national bargaining force until the establishment of the National Union of Mineworkers.

The Trade Disputes and Trade Unions Act 1927 banned sympathy strikes, general strikes, and mass picketing, creating a system whereby trade union members had to 'opt-in' to paying the political levy to the Labour Party.

Following the strike, the TUC and trade union movement remained intact and did not change their basic policies. Keith Laybourn says that historians mostly agree that "In no significant way could the General Strike be considered a turning point or watershed in British industrial history." Trade union membership, on the other hand, reduced substantially and the unions were weakened. There have been no further general strikes in Britain. Union leader Ernest Bevin, who had coordinated the strike, considered the strike a mistake; he decided that action by political parties was a better solution. Rank and file workers, however, felt betrayed by the TUC. An issue of the Worker's Bulletin published around the time the TUC called off the strike described the decision to call it off as "the greatest crime that has ever been permitted ... against the working class of Great Britain".

The country came close to a one-day general strike on 31 July 1972 over the imprisonment of the Pentonville Five. There was a general strike amongst loyalists in Northern Ireland in 1974.

== In popular culture ==
- Young Anarchy (1926) by Philip Gibbs was the first novel to mention the general strike.
- Meanwhile (1927) by H. G. Wells was the first novel to feature the general strike and describes its effect on the British labour movement.
- Swan Song, a 1928 novel by John Galsworthy that is part of The Forsyte Saga, depicts the response of the English upper classes to the strike.
- The poet Hugh MacDiarmid composed an ultimately pessimistic lyrical response to the strike, which he incorporated into his long modernist poem of the same year, "A Drunk Man Looks at the Thistle". His imagistic depiction of how events unfolded occurs in the extended passage beginning "I saw a rose come loupin oot..." (line 1119).
- Harold Heslop's 1929 novel The Gate of a Strange Field is set during the strike and describes the events from the viewpoint of striking miners.
- Ellen Wilkinson's 1929 novel Clash focuses on a woman activist's involvement with the strike.
- The strike functions as the endpiece of the satirical novel, The Apes of God, by Wyndham Lewis. In that novel, the half-hearted nature of the strike, and its eventual collapse, represents the political and moral stagnation of 1920s Britain.
- The strike forms the climax of Cloud Howe (1933), by Lewis Grassic Gibbon, part of his A Scots Quair series of novels.
- In James Hilton's 1934 novel Goodbye, Mr. Chips, the retired schoolmaster Chipping calls the strike "a very fine advertisement" since there was "not a life lost" and "not a shot fired".
- The failure of the strike inspired Idris Davies to write "Bells of Rhymney" (published 1938), which Pete Seeger made into the song "The Bells of Rhymney" (recorded 1958).
- In the 1945 novel, Brideshead Revisited by Evelyn Waugh, the main character, Charles Ryder, returns from France to London to fight against the workers on strike.
- Not Honour More (1955) by Joyce Cary is a historical novel revolving around the strike.
- In Raymond Williams's 1960 novel Border Country, Matthew Price's father is a part of the strike, alongside his signalmen colleagues.
- The LWT series Upstairs, Downstairs devoted an episode, "The Nine Days Wonder" (Series Five, episode 9; original airing date, 2 November 1975), to the general strike.
- The strike is referred to in several episodes of the BBC sitcom You Rang, M'Lord?.
- Touchstone, a 2007 novel by Laurie R. King, is set in the final weeks before the strike. The issues and factions involved, and an attempt to forestall the strike are key plot points.
- A BBC series, The House of Eliott, included an episode depicting the general strike.
- In the novel Any Human Heart by William Boyd, the protagonist Logan Mountstuart volunteers himself as a special constable in the strike.
- In Peter Dickinson's 1981 novel A Summer in the Twenties, the protagonist, having served as a volunteer train driver during the strike, becomes involved with the labor movement on the Hull docks.
- Robert Rae's 2012 film The Happy Lands is set amongst coal miners in Fife during the strike.
- The fourth part of Ken Loach's film tetralogy Days of Hope is devoted to the strike.
- In the alternate history short story "If the General Strike Had Succeeded" by Ronald Knox contained in the anthology If It Had Happened Otherwise, the story is in the form of an article from The Times of 1931, which describes Great Britain under communist rule.
- The strike is mentioned in David Peace's novel GB84 at New Year of 1985 when two old neighbours talk about parallels with the long miners' strike of 1984–85.
- The fourth series of the BBC Two television show Peaky Blinders is set in the period immediately prior to and during the strike. The series emphasises the involvement of revolutionary communist elements including Jessie Eden.
- The Future in our Past: The General Strike, 1926/2026 by Callum Cant and Matthew Lee covers the strike.
- The Edge of Revolution: The General Strike that Shook Britain by David Torrance covers the strike.
