= Andrew Thorpe =

British historian

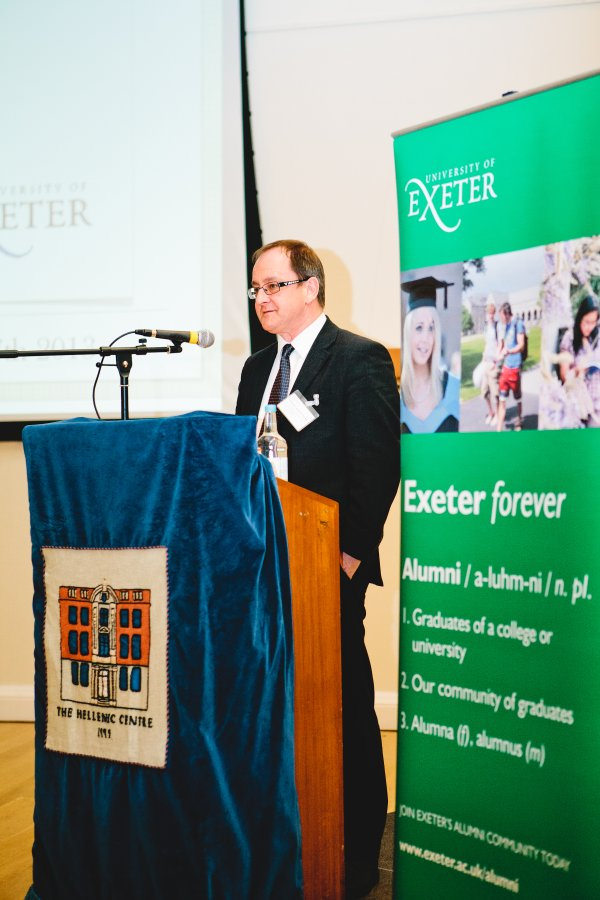
Andrew Thorpe speaking at the Leventis Lectures Alumni event 2013 at the University of Exeter.

Andrew Thorpe (born 1962) is a British historian. He is Professor of Modern History and (from 2004 to 2007) was Head of History at the University of Exeter. He went on to be Exeter's Director of Research for Humanities and Social Sciences before moving to the University of Leeds in 2019.

He is a noted historian on the British Labour Party and Communist Party particularly in the era of the Communist International, having been one of the few foreign, non-party historians to have had access to archives in Moscow following the fall of the Soviet Union. Historian Helen McCarthy calls Thorpe "One of the historical profession’s leading authorities on British party politics in the twentieth century."

January 2009 saw the publication of Thorpe's new work titled Parties at War, which examined all the major parties in Britain during the Second World War. The subject of the book has been the topic of his taught undergraduate module of the same name at the University of Exeter and is the product of over five years research. Reviewer Keith Laybourn calls it a "pioneering work" stating:

What Thorpe has done is examine more than 250 collections of regional and constituency records drawn from the Labour, Conservative and Liberal parties, and examined what occurred in the wartime period of political truce. Although he admits that the records cannot be balanced absolutely, statistically, or in some representative manner, he has produced what is surely going to be the standard work on wartime British politics during the Second World War."

Reviewer Duncan Tanner states, "As a result of this unparalleled research effort, Thorpe convincingly refutes the claim that the Conservatives were uniquely distracted by the needs of the country [i.e. that the Conservative Party withered away, contributing to their election defeat of 1945, because Conservatives were engaged in waging the war whilst Labour were engaged in party politics].

Currently Professor Thorpe is working on the biography of Labour leader and Nobel prize winner Arthur Henderson.

In September 2019 it was announced that Professor Thorpe will become the Executive Dean of the Faculty of Arts, Humanities and Cultures at the University of Leeds as well as becoming Professor of Modern History from 1 January 2020.

== Works ==
- The British general election of 1931, Oxford: Clarendon Press, 1991
- Britain in the 1930s: the deceptive decade, Oxford: Blackwell/Historical Association, 1992
- The Longman Companion to Britain in the Era of the World Wars, 1914-1945, London: Longman, 1993
- A History of the British Labour Party, London: Macmillan, 1997; 2nd edition: Palgrave, 2001
- Britain 1916-1940, Bedford: Sempringham Press, 1998
- International Communism and the Communist International, 1919-43, Manchester: Manchester University Press, 1998
- The British Communist Party and Moscow, 1920-1943, Manchester: Manchester University Press, 2000
- Parties at War: Political organization in Second World War Britain, Oxford: Oxford University Press, 2009
