= 1981 Cape Breton coal strike =

Miners' strike in Nova Scotia, Canada

- Date: July 17–October 8, 1981
- Location: Cape Breton Island, Nova Scotia
- Goals: Wage increases
- Methods: Strike, sabotage, bombing
- Result: Schism within the union, lower than asked-for wage increase

Parties
United Mine Workers of America District 26	Cape Breton Development Corporation

Number
4,000 miners	

The Cape Breton coal strike of 1981 was a strike by coal miners who were members of the United Mine Workers of America (UMW) District 26 against the Cape Breton Development Corporation (DEVCO) of Cape Breton Island, Nova Scotia, Canada. It was the first strike by District 26 since 1947. The high double-digit inflation of the late 1970s and early 1980s affected the buying power for the miners. The strike, which was bitter and violent, began on July 17, 1981. It ended on October 8, 1981, after the fourth contract vote.

In the aftermath of the strike, the UMW leadership, both locally and internationally were criticized. The UMW did not issue the pre-paid strike fund, so the miners went 13 weeks without any pay. The local's president and executive were removed by the president of the UMW in 1983. It was a move to stop a challenge from a new Canadian union trying to decertify the UMW. In the end, the UMW prevailed, but the strike left bitter feelings between the local and the international union.

== Historical context ==
Coal miners in Nova Scotia were first organized by the Provincial Workmen's Association (PWA) in 1881. The United Mine Workers of America (UMWA) attempted to organize the miners and supplant the PWA in 1909. The two unions fought for control, but in 1917 joined forces and formed the Amalgamated Mine Workers of Nova Scotia. The Amalgamated affiliated fully with UMWA within three years. Miners were represented continuously by District 26 of UMWA over the next 80 years. Strikes during this period were exceedingly rare. Nevertheless, major and often violent work stoppages occurred in 1920s.

=== BESCO/DOSCO ===
In 1920, the British Empire Steel Corporation (BESCO) took ownership of all coal mines on Cape Breton Island. UMWA and BESCO had an extremely adversarial relationship. Three strikes in 1921, 1922 and 1925 eventually damaged BESCO.

The company was not making a profit and was reorganized, emerging in 1928 as the Dominion Steel and Coal Corporation. In the post-war period of the 1950s and 1960s, technological innovation, the difficulty of mining coal (coal in Cape Breton was increasingly mined from veins under the sea floor), and the availability of natural gas (piped from oil fields in Western Canada) led to rapid decreases in the amount of coal mined as well as the number of miners. The economic viability of the Cape Breton mines declined significantly to the point that they were only operable because of federal government subsidies.

=== DEVCO ===
On July 7, 1967, the Cape Breton Development Corporation (DEVCO) – a federal crown corporation – was founded. Its original mandate was to close the mines, but when it took ownership of the Cape Breton mines management discovered they could continue for at least another 15 years with modernization. Relations between the District 26 and the various companies that owned the mines post-war were good. These amicable labour relations meant there was over 33 years of labour peace since the previous strike in 1947.

== Strike ==
=== Lead-up to the Strike ===
Wages became a major issue as the 1980-81 recession and double-digit inflation eroded a miner's buying power. The miners were without a contract since December 31, 1980 and were making a base pay of $58 per day (roughly $181 CAD in 2023). Nova Scotia judge Nathan Green wrote a conciliation report in spring 1981 recommending an $8.50 (roughly $26 CAD in 2023) per day raise, each year, over a two-year contract that DEVCO accepted. However, when District 26's president, Ray Holland, brought it to a ratification vote on July 7, the rank and file members rejected it 1,954 to 827. On July 13, Holland informed DEVCO president Steve Rankin that they were in a legal strike situation, and would strike if they didn't get a better offer from the new federal mediator.

=== Strike begins ===
On July 17, 1981, 4,000 miners in the Cape Breton coal fields went on strike against DEVCO. The miners sought a 50 percent wage increase over two years. It was the first strike since nationalization of the mines in 1968. The 13-week strike was a bitter one. When the Cabinet of Canadian Prime Minister Pierre Trudeau met in Sydney, Nova Scotia, in mid-September 1981, striking miners forced their way onto the airport tarmac and cornered Mark MacGuigan and local Member of Parliament Russell MacLellan to demand an end to the strike. The 125 or so strikers were expecting Prime Minister Trudeau but his plane arrived a few hours later. Three federal mediators attempted to negotiate an end to the strike, and three times the miners rejected tentative contracts (the last one proposing a 50 percent wage hike over three years).

Vandalism against company property began in August, and quickly escalated. In mid-September, a bomb was detonated at a DEVCO mine, and DEVCO coal rail cars derailed at the company's Lingan mine in New Waterford.

A fourth federal mediator arrived just days after the bombings. The strike finally ended on October 8, 1981, when a tentative agreement which raised wages 50 percent over two years was ratified.

=== Missing UMW Strike Fund ===
160,000 UMW members were on a 72-day strike in the United States during the spring of 1981. This major strike only ended on June 6, 1981. There was no money left in the international union's strike fund. The Cape Breton miners were deeply angered when the UMW was unable to support their District 26 strike after paying the American union millions of dollars in dues since their last strike. A delegation from District 26 went to the UMW's headquarters in Washington, D.C. during the strike and were told "it was their responsibility to provide a strike fund." To support the strike effort, the local union organized a United Mine Workers Wives Association to raise funds and provide food, financial support, and other charity for strikers' families.

== Aftermath ==
Seething over the international union's inability to fund the strike, dissident miners attempted to organize their own union with the help and support of the Confederation of Canadian Unions (CCU). The attempt to decertify the United Mine Workers and replace it with a new union was part of a larger movement among Canadian labour unions to split away from their parent "international" unions in the United States. Widespread discontent existed over the amount of dues sent to international union headquarters in America (many Canadian unions called them "profits") and the relatively minor attention given to the problems of Canadian workers in return.

The CCU founded the Canadian Mineworkers Union, and began an organizing campaign in 1982. In a federally-supervised union election in March 1983, the miners voted 1,750 to 1,393 against affiliating with the CMU. CMU forced a second election in March 1984 when it signed up a majority of DEVCO's 3,400 workers. The UMWA's new president, Richard Trumka, flew in from Washington about a week before the second vote. His visit boosted the UMWA and the miners rejected disaffiliation a second time by a vote of 1,795 to 1,242. CMU's support declined quickly thereafter, as miners became disenchanted with the constant campaigning for votes. UMWA was never challenged again, and continued to represent miners on Cape Breton Island for the next 17 years.

However, the economic viability of the Cape Breton coal mines continued to decline. On September 13, 1999, DEVCO's Lingan Phalen mine was abruptly closed a year earlier than expected because of safety concerns, making 430 miners jobless. DEVCO closed all mines in 2001, and UMWA Local 26 disbanded.

== See also ==
- Canadian Mineworkers Union
- List of incidents of civil unrest in Canada
- William Davis Miners' Memorial Day
