= King James I Academy =

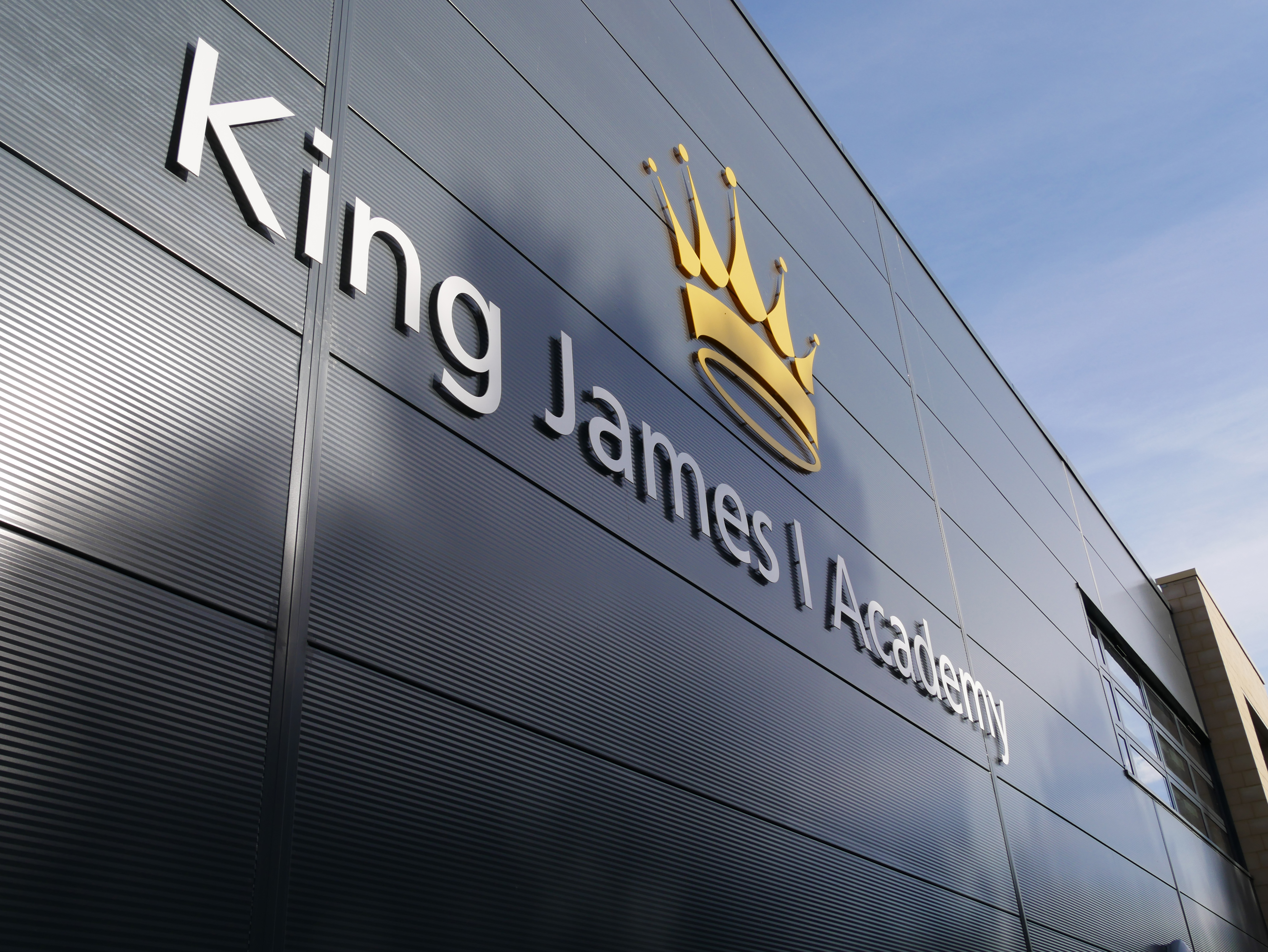

Location
- South Church Road; Bishop Auckland, County Durham, DL14 7JZ; England
- Coordinates: 54.6598°N 1.67°W

Information
- Type: Academy
- Established: 1605; 421 years ago
- Local authority: Durham County Council
- Department for Education URN: 136770 Tables
- Ofsted: Reports
- Chair: Elizabeth Varley
- Headteacher: S. Whitehead
- Gender: Coeducational
- Age: 11 to 18
- Colours: Black and Gold
- Former names: King James I Community Arts College; King James I Community College; King James I Comprehensive; King James I Grammar School
- Website: Official website

King James I Academy (formally known as King James I Community Arts College) is a medium size academy school and sixth form centre for mixed gender aged 11–18 in the town of Bishop Auckland in County Durham in northeast England. It traces its history to the early 17th century. The site currently consists of two large two-storey buildings as well as a few small cabins, including the "Kings Feast" which is used to sell food at breaks, lunches and special occasions. The others are used as classrooms or form rooms similar to the rooms inside the other buildings.

== History ==
Opened in 1605, by King James I of England it went through multiple transformations and renaming. It was mainly known as King James 1st Grammar School and became the first secondary school in south-west Durham to be upgraded to academy status.

In an interview, Elizabeth Varley (Chair Of Governors For The Academy and former student) described how many years ago, students had to pass a test to be able to attend the academy since at the time it was a Grammar School where boys and girls were educated separately. She also revealed that the current Art block was not part of the original Middle School building, and that it was added at a later date to house a school swimming pool (which has since been blocked up).

In 2022 there were 944 students in the academy, with 136 of them being sixth formers. Its staff including representatives from Connexions and the NHS.

== Ofsted inspections ==
As of the last inspection in 2022, Ofsted reports this in regards to attending the school:

Pupils are involved in shaping life in the school. Leaders’ high expectations of pupils are set out in the school’s '7 Standards'. These include values such as ‘be prepared’ and ‘engage and succeed’. Pupils understand the importance of these expectations. They enjoy coming to school. Pupils conduct themselves well in lessons and make visitors feel welcome. Pupils feel safe. They value the help that they can get from the student support team. Pupils who are less confident speaking to staff can ask for help by email or put a message in the letterboxes around the school. Most pupils told us that when bullying occurs, it is handled well by staff. Students in the sixth form enjoy a wide range of academic and vocational courses. This includes programmes to support students who otherwise might struggle to stay in education at the end of Year 11.

== Uniform ==
The uniform exists for students in years 7 to 11 and consists of:

- Black trousers or skirt.
- A blazer with the King James logo or a plain black v-neck jumper.
- Smart, black shoes. (No trainers or sandals).
- A plain white t-shirt or shirt.
- A school tie (black, blue and gold in colour).

== Notable former pupils ==
- William Armstrong, 1st Baron Armstrong, who founded Armstrong Whitworth
- Keith Hampson, Conservative MP from February 1974 - 1983 for Ripon, then Leeds Northwest from 1983 to 1997
- Harold Heslop, writer
- Derek Hodgson, priest
- Stan Laurel, comedian
- Andrew Nelson, footballer for Dundee F.C.
- Harold Orton, Professor of English Language and Medieval English Literature from 1946 to 1964 at the University of Leeds
- Tom Stanage, Bishop of Bloemfontein from 1982 to 1997
- Thomas Wright, astronomer
