= Disillusion (Upstairs, Downstairs) =

- Upstairs, Downstairs episode
- Lily Hawkins
- Episode no.: Season 5 Episode 7
- Directed by: Bill Bain
- Written by: Alfred Shaughnessy
- Production code: 7
- Original air date: 19 October 1975

Episode chronology
← Previous "An Old Flame"	Next → "Such A Lovely Man"

"Disillusion" is the seventh episode of the fifth and final series of the period drama Upstairs, Downstairs. It first aired on 19 October 1975 on ITV.

== Background ==
Disillusion was recorded in the studio on 3 and 4 April 1975, and was the final appearance of Karen Dotrice as Lily Hawkins.

== Plot ==
It is the spring of 1924, and Georgina returns from New York, having stayed with Elizabeth in her city apartment. Meanwhile, Daisy gets annoyed when Lily is given time off by Mr Hudson to go shopping. A few days later, while at the Wembley Exhibition, Georgina spots Hudson and Lily holding hands. That evening, she tells Virginia, and Virginia asks Rose if Lily is seeing anyone. Rose says she knows nothing, but visits Lily and asks if she is going out with Mr Hudson. Lily confirms this and tells Rose how he has taken her to concerts and museums. Very soon, the whole house knows what has been going on.

Hudson explains to Mrs Bridges that Lily brings him hope and joy, and he tells Virginia that he has "very deep feelings" for her. Mrs Bridges is upset, as she and Hudson had agreed that one day they would marry. Hudson soon decides to resign and gives four weeks notice. Hudson wants to go with Lily on Sunday to see her mother in Banbury to ask for Lily's hand in marriage. However Lily cannot bring herself to tell him that she does not love him. On Sunday morning, having spoken to Georgina, Lily talks to Hudson, and deliberately hurts him by saying insulting things about him.

Early the following morning, Lily leaves without telling anyone and goes back to live with her mother. She leaves a note for Mr Hudson, explaining she did not mean the hurtful things she said the day before; she had only wanted to stop him caring for her. Hudson withdraws his resignation, and Virginia writes a good reference for Lily.

== Cast ==
- Gordon Jackson - Hudson
- Jean Marsh - Rose
- Angela Baddeley - Mrs Bridges
- Lesley-Anne Down - Georgina Worsley
- David Langton - Richard Bellamy
- Hannah Gordon - Virginia Bellamy
- Karen Dotrice - Lily
- Christopher Beeny - Edward
- Jenny Tomasin - Ruby
- Gareth Hunt - Frederick
- Jacqueline Tong - Daisy
