= Such a Lovely Man =

- Upstairs, Downstairs episode
- Episode no.: Season 5 Episode 8
- Directed by: Christopher Hodson
- Written by: Rosemary Anne Sisson
- Production code: 8
- Original air date: 26 October 1975

Episode chronology
← Previous "Disillusion"	Next → "The Nine Days Wonder"

"Such a Lovely Man" is the eighth episode of the fifth and final series of the period drama Upstairs, Downstairs. It first aired on 26 October 1975 on ITV.

== Background ==
"Such a Lovely Man" was recorded in the studio on 17 and 18 April 1975. John Hawkesworth and Alfred Shaughnessy wished an episode to revolve around Hannah Gordon's character Virginia, and Rosemary Anne Sisson wrote "Such A Lovely Man". The character of Sir Guy Paynter was inspired by Sir Philip Sassoon, who was the Conservative Member of Parliament for Hythe from 1912 until his death in 1939.

== Plot ==
It is the summer of 1925, and Richard finds out that the post of Under-Secretary of State for Foreign Affairs is soon to be vacant. He thinks that Sir Guy Paynter, a wealthy and influential bachelor industrialist, would be able to use his influence with senior ministers to help Richard obtain the post. Virginia agrees, and invites Sir Guy to lunch. However, the lunch ends abruptly when Sir Guy makes a remark about death by firing squad for cowardice, not knowing that Virginia's son Michael was court-martialled for such an offence, but only reprimanded, sent back into action, and killed (this is dealt with in the earlier episode Facing Fearful Odds). Sir Guy sends flowers to Virginia to apologise, and he then takes her to a small political luncheon as his hostess. As a thank you, he gives her a signed first edition of Browning's poems.

Meanwhile, Ruby answers a newspaper advert for pen pals, and she chooses to write to Herbert Turner, a 35-year-old post office clerk who lives with his parents in Balham. They soon go to the cinema together, and Hudson and Mrs Bridges invite him to Eaton Place for Sunday tea in the servants' hall.

Virginia agrees to attend a weekend party at Sir Guy's house, Shelburne, while Richard is in Paris for meetings. Richard tells James that he does not mind Virginia spending time with Sir Guy, because Paynter is not the "marrying kind". On the Sunday night, all the other guests leave Shelburne, leaving Sir Guy and Virginia alone except for the staff. He provides champagne and caviar. Virginia then drops hints about the Foreign Office post. Shortly afterwards, the gossip columns of the newspapers are filled with rumours about the pair. The Eaton Place servants speculate that Herbert Turner, who has shown a great interest in the aristocracy, may be the source, but it later emerges that one of the other Shelburne guests had told the newspapers.

Richard then asks Virginia not to see so much of Sir Guy, and Virginia turns down Sir Guy's invitation to join him and others on a holiday cruise. He then comes to Eaton Place and asks for the Browning book back, saying that he had only lent it to her. After he leaves with the book, Richard returns and says he has been offered the Foreign Office post by Prime Minister Stanley Baldwin. Baldwin had received a note from Sir Guy recommending someone else, saying Richard was too old, and this made Baldwin decide on Richard as he did not like people being "in Sir Guy's pocket".

A few weeks after their first meeting, Turner asks Ruby to marry him, but she turns him down, partly because he does not look like Rudolph Valentino. Instead, she plans a cruise of her own.

== Cast ==
- Gordon Jackson - Hudson
- Hannah Gordon - Virginia Bellamy
- Angela Baddeley - Mrs Bridges
- David Langton - Richard Bellamy
- Jean Marsh - Rose
- Robert Hardy - Sir Guy Paynter
- Joan Benham - Lady Prudence Fairfax
- Simon Williams - James Bellamy
- Christopher Beeny - Edward
- Gareth Hunt - Frederick
- Jenny Tomasin - Ruby
- Polly Adams - Mrs. Polly Merivale
- Jacqueline Tong - Daisy
- John Normington - Herbert Turner
- Leonard Kavanagh - Parsons
- Steve Ismay - Footman (uncredited)
