= West Ham Power Station =

Former coal-fired power station in London, England

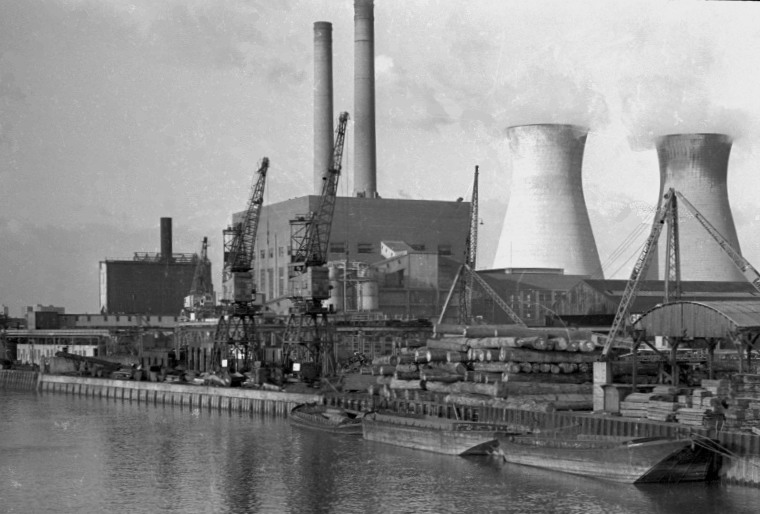
- West Ham 'B' Power Station 1974
- Country: England
- Location: Greater London
- Coordinates: 51.5180°N 0.0014°E
- Status: Decommissioned and demolished
- Commission date: 1904 (West Ham A); 1951 (West Ham B)
- Decommission date: 1968 (West Ham A); 1983 (West Ham B)
- Operators: West Ham Borough Council (1904–1947); British Electricity Authority (1947–1955); Central Electricity Authority (1955–1957); Central Electricity Generating Board (1958–1983)

Thermal power station
- Primary fuel: Coal
- Chimneys: 3
- Cooling towers: ? × Wooden, 2 × concrete parabolic
- Cooling source: Recirculating water

Power generation
- Units operational: 1 × 30 MW, 3 × 130 MW
- Units decommissioned: All
- Nameplate capacity: 114 MW
- Annual net output: (See graph in text)

External links
- Commons: Related media on Commons

West Ham Power Station was a coal-fired power station on Bow Creek (the tidal mouth of the River Lea) at Canning Town, in east London. It was often referred to informally as Canning Town Power Station.

== History ==
The first power station at Canning Town was opened by West Ham Borough Council in 1904, in part to supply the borough's tramways. It replaced an earlier station built in 1898 at Abbey Mills. At opening the station contained seventeen Babcock & Wilcox boilers six of which had been relocated from Abbey Mills.These supplied steam to 2 x 300kW, 2 x 600 kW, 2 x 1,200 kW and 3 x 500 kW Ferranti engines and dynamo/alternators. In 1907 a 1,500 kW Willans steam turbo alternator was added. The station was extended several times between 1908 and 1930, making West Ham one of the largest municipal electricity suppliers in London.

The generating capacity, maximum load, and electricity generated and sold was as follows:

West Ham A power station generating capacity, load and electricity produced and sold, 1912–57
Year	Generating capacity, MW	Maximum load, MW	Electricity generated, GWh	Electricity sold, GWh
1912/3	14.100	11.362	33.974	27.466
1918/9	17.900	11.450	45.751	38.216
1919/20	17.900	12.850	49.701	41.628
1923/4	35.500	19.040	59.998	50.612
1936/7	76.500	39.940	146.182	55.240
1946		59.570	146.151	132.803
1953/4	51			27.859
1954/5	51			22.102
1955/6	48			20.276
1956/7	48			26.001
1957/8	48			22.367
1960/1	48			6.97
1961/2	48			4.72
1962/3	48			12.82

In 1923 the AC plant comprised: 2 × 600 kW and 1 × 1,200 kW reciprocating engines and generators and 2 × 1,500 kW, 2 × 3,000 kW, 1 × 5,000 kW and 1 × 10,000 kW turbo-alternators. The DC supply was generated by 3 × 500 kW reciprocating engines and generators. The DC supply was at 550V and was used for traction current. The 2-phase AC supply was at 100 and 200V and at 200 and 400V. The total installed generating capacity was 27,900 kW. The boiler plant (four Vickers-Spearling and two Stirling boilers) produced a total of 618,440 lb/hr (77.9 kg/s) of steam. In 1923 the station generated 53.965 GWh of electricity, some of this was used in the plant, the total amount sold was 45.782 GWh. The revenue from sales of current was £330,110, this gave a surplus of revenue over expenses of £112,084.

In 1930 a 30,000 kW English Electric turbo alternator was commissioned. At the time it was the largest set running at 3,000 rpm. This necessitated an extension to the boiler plant comprises the two Stirling boilers each capable of a maximum evaporation of 177,000 lb. per hour (normal 147,500). The Central Electricity Board had instructed the installation of an additional 30,000 kW set in 1939 but the interruption of World War 2 prevented its installation. Post the Second World War it was determined a bigger station would be required which led to West Ham B being constructed.

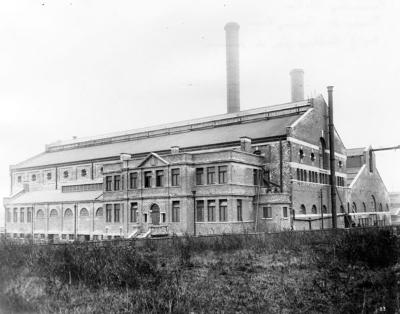
The power station seen from the Lea in 1904.

West Ham A Power Station used two phase generators as compared with conventional three phase. The local undertaking in West Ham also distributed two phase electricity. In its later life it was connected to the National Grid using Scott connected transformers that converted two phase to three phase electricity.

The station was located off the long-demolished Tucker Street. It was damaged in a bombing raid in September 1940 during the Second World War. Upon nationalisation of the electricity industry in 1947 the operating of the station was taken over by British Electricity Authority. In 1959 there were two 10 MW Metropolitan-Vickers, one 12.5 MW Metropolitan-Vickers, and one 30 MW English Electric turbo-alternators. By 1964 the Metro.-Vickers units had been decommissioned, the A station had a single 30 MW generator, installed in 1923. The station ran for 696 hours in 1961 and gave an output of 5.91 GWh, and had a thermal efficiency of 8.21 per cent. The steam capacity of the boilers was 600,000 lb/hr (75.6 kg/s). Steam conditions at the turbine stop valve was 190/200 psi (13.1/13.8 bar) and 318/371 °C. The A Station used the original wooden cooling towers. The generator and the A station was decommissioned in 1968.

== West Ham B ==
The BEA completed a new West Ham B Power Station to the south of the original station in 1951. Initially it contained 2 × 30 MW English Electric turbo-alternators and four John Thompson 'Radiant' water tube boilers each with a capacity of 180,000 lb/hr giving a steam capacity of 1,440,000 lb/hr (181.4 kg/s). Steam conditions at the turbine stop valve was 625 psi (43.18 bar) and 460 °C.

The station was expanded to four turbo alternators and eight boilers but had originally been planned for six 30 MW sets. This had two prominent concrete cooling towers each with a capacity of 2.8 million gallons per hour (3.54 m^{3}/s). Make up water was abstracted from the River Lea. As well as burning coal the B Station burnt coke blended with coal in its chain grate boilers. The coke was supplied from the adjacent Bromley Gas works.The railway sidings linked to the North London Line at Stephenson Street. Electricity output from the B power station during 1954-1983 was as follows.

West Ham B annual electricity output GWh

On 28 June 1966 the temporary scaffolding in one of the cooling towers collapsed, killing a worker.

== Closure ==
Having been taken over by the CEGB in 1958, the B station was closed on 31 October 1983 with a generating capacity of 114 MW. It was subsequently demolished, and the site of the power station is now occupied by the Electra Business Park.
