= British Worker =

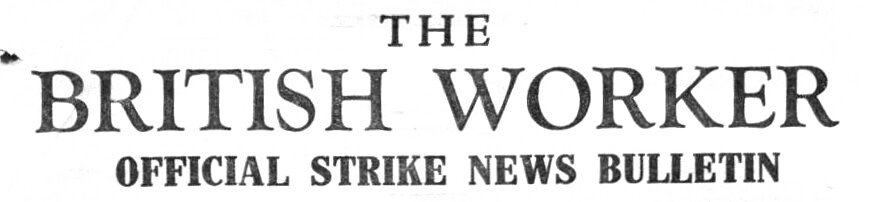

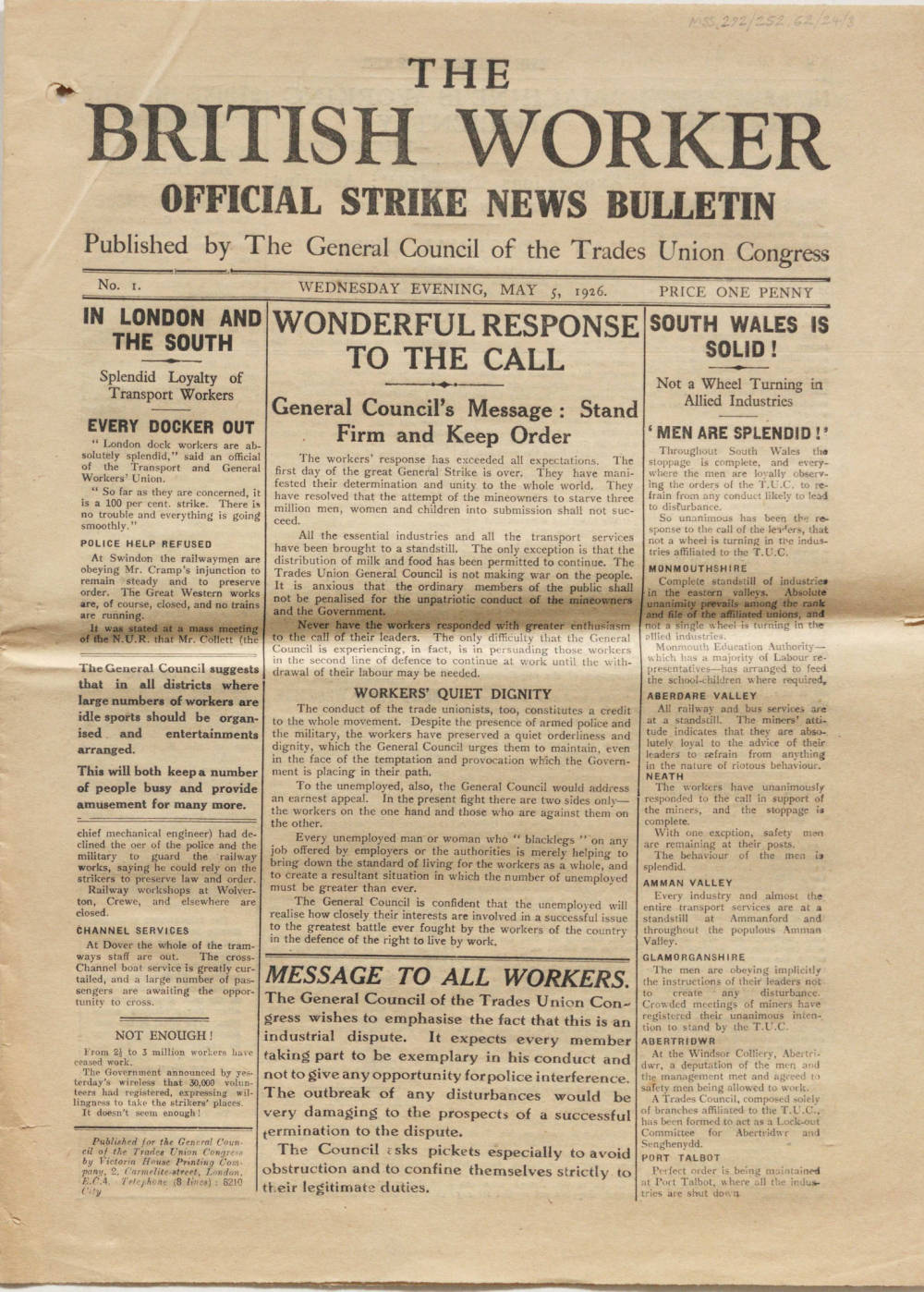
- Front Page of the first issue (5 May 1926)
- Type: Daily newspaper
- Owner: Trades Union Congress General Council
- Editor: Hamilton Fyfe
- Founded: 5 May 1926
- Ceased publication: 17 May 1926
- Circulation: 320,000 to 700,000

The British Worker was a newspaper produced by the General Council of the Trades Union Congress for the duration of the 1926 United Kingdom general strike. The first of eleven issues was printed on 5 May and publication stopped on 17 May after the official cessation of the strike. The principal objective of the newspaper was to circulate information and maintain the strikers' morale throughout the stoppage.

== History ==
On 3 May 1926, the TUC General Council called a general strike in an unsuccessful attempt to force government action in the ongoing miners dispute over wages and worsening conditions. The printing press workers were among those withdrawn at the outset, effectively preventing the publication of most daily national newspapers (most London national newspapers continued in truncated form, with many local newspapers also producing strike sheets. The TUC, therefore, did not initially anticipate the use of a newspaper and instead issued bulletins, through its Press and Publicity Committee, containing brief news and instructions.

The production of a newspaper was not initially favoured by the Publicity Committee. Suggestions were first made on the eve of the strike by the national officers of the Printing and Kindred Trades Federation. It was more seriously considered on the first day of the strike. The editor of the Daily Herald, Hamilton Fyfe, accompanied by his night editor, William Mellor, and General Manager, Robert Williams, approached the TUC General Council's Press and Publicity Committee to discuss the production of a newspaper to articulate the TUC's case. The decision to create the Worker was, however, mostly reactionary, as Fyfe disclosed government plans to produce a publication called the British Gazette.

The cabinet newspaper, edited by Winston Churchill, attempted to diminish strike credibility and morale. With its launch, the Publicity Committee quickly appreciated the advantages of producing a newspaper: it enabled communication with the workers on strike, it afforded the General Council a powerful instrument of control over strike conduct and could combat any misleading messages published in the Gazette. The Daily Herald offices on Tudor Street in London were preferred for printing as the newspaper was forced to cease production during the strike, while Hamilton Fyfe oversaw the editorship. The first issue therefore appeared just before midnight on 5 May, containing eight pages of strike news and information, costing one penny.

The transitory publication encountered problems from the very start. It caused considerable disquiet among the printers who feared it would be determined as strike-breaking, but objections were overcome after receiving an official letter from the General Council. Further difficulties arose when ministerial authority intervened in production. A police raid on the Herald offices was undertaken on 5 May. Policemen entered the building with a warrant to seize all copies of the 4 May edition of the Herald. It soon became clear that they were distinctly more interested in the future publication of the Worker, and they obtained a dozen copies to be sent to London's Chief Commissioner. Printing was, however, allowed to continue. A more devious tactic developed on 7 May, when Churchill requisitioned the bulk of the supply of the Worker's newsprint. Such provocative action compelled the Publicity Committee to reduce the paper's size from eight pages to four. It continued in this format until the last issue was produced on 17 May.

== Provincial editions ==
As the strike continued, the production of the British Worker increased, running 320,000 copies for the first issue, multiplying to a peak of 700,000 on 12 May. They were readily distributed and sold by wholesalers and newsagents. Distribution however became perhaps the greatest difficulty confronting the Press and Publicity Committee. Early reports suggested that the TUC publication was struggling to penetrate whole districts around the country. The rival government newspaper combated this problem through the acquirement of hundreds of lorries and cars, reinforced by the use of aircraft flying each night from Northolt and Biggin Hill which circulated the paper in Yorkshire, Liverpool and Plymouth.

The Publicity Committee decided to launch provincial editions to control the spread of strike news throughout the country. It was welcomed by strike committees in certain localities who urged the importance of improved publicity, strike information and a counter to virulent blackleg publications. The Publicity Committee discouraged local printed bulletins, persistently worried that provocative material would emerge in the local sheets.

Publication was planned for Leicester, Manchester, Cardiff, Liverpool, Glasgow, Newcastle and other areas. However, the establishment of these centres never fully materialised as the General Council faced opposition from the printing unions, and were themselves wary of handing control of the newspaper over to localities, fearing the insertion of rash statements.

Manchester and Newcastle were selected as the first locations for provincial production. Both faced opposition, forcing them to change printing locations: in Newcastle, production was relocated to a Sunderland printing shop because of local resentment surrounding food delivery permits. The production costs were also elevated because some involved demanded pay. Nevertheless, both provincial editions were launched. Manchester produced 50,000 copies on 10 May, doubling its output by 12 May - it distributed papers to the Midlands, Yorkshire and the North West. Sunderland circulated 16,000 copies on 11 May.

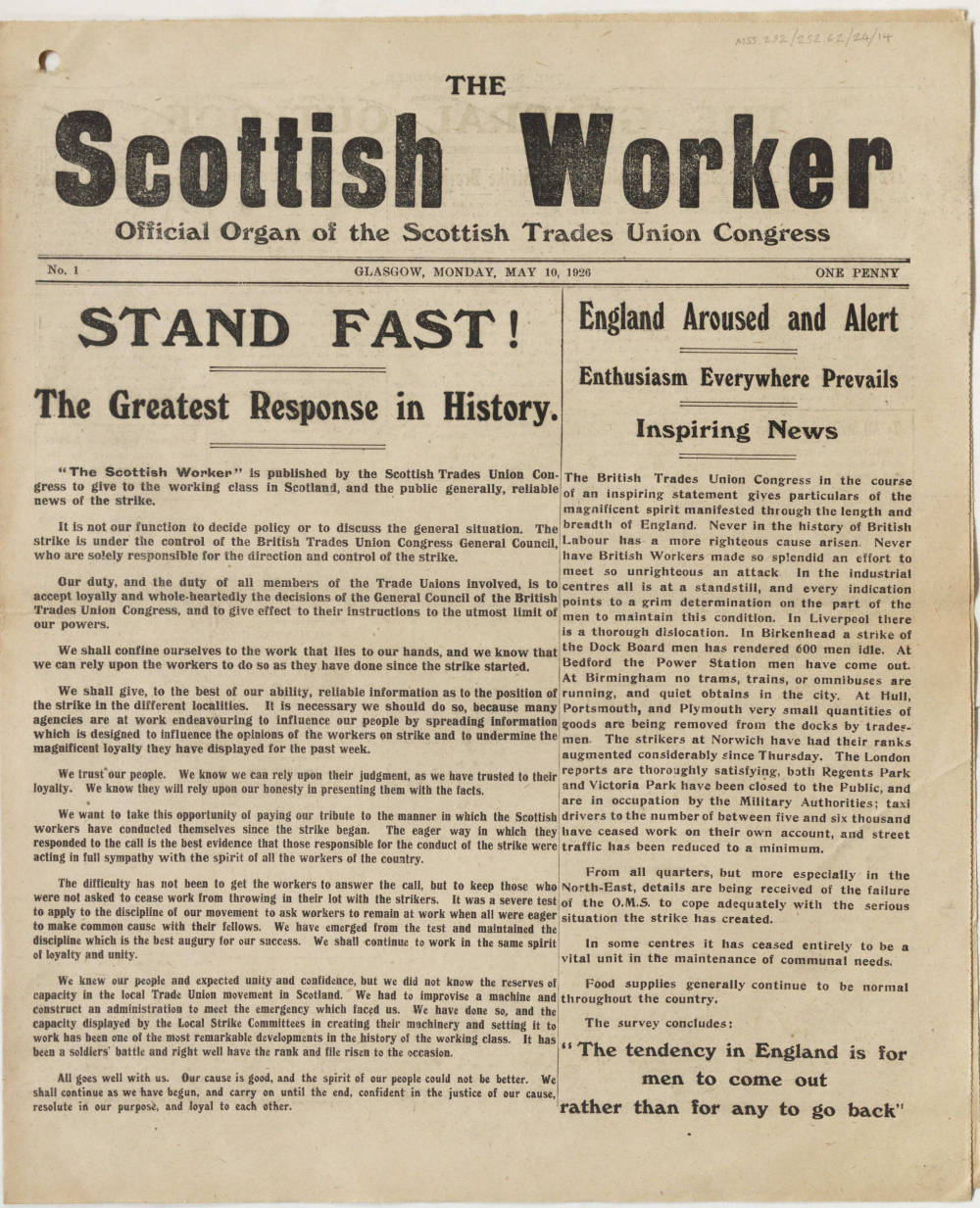
Front page of the first edition of the Scottish Worker

The Scottish TUC intended to create their own newspaper, the Scottish Worker, but its proposal was not well received by the Publicity Committee, instructing to relinquish their plans and instead produce the British Worker on Clydeside. The project was however slow, so the Scottish Worker was published until 15 May, when there was an unsuccessful attempt to deliver a copy of the British Worker from Manchester.

The plan to publish provincial issues of the British Worker was effectively carried out in South Wales, printed in Cardiff and Newport under the supervision of W. H. Stevenson from 10 May. They also intended to print the newspaper in Swansea, but this plight was abandoned because of objections from the local Typographical Association.

As the strike neared its conclusion and production eventually ceased, the demand for local news outlets had not been satisfied as the Publicity Committee were still considering decentralisation to facilitate production in areas not penetrated - editions of the British Worker outside London were simply appearing too late. Furthermore, the use of local outlets assisted the Publicity Committee more than local strike organisations. The intention to widen circulation weakened the stance of the Typographical Associations and Unions around the country who considered it strike-breaking.

== Editorial policy ==
The Worker's editorial policy remained consistent throughout the strike. Its content was controlled and censored by the Publicity Committee, illustrated by the constant presence of a representative at Fyfe's office.

The committee's three publication objectives emanate in each edition of the newspaper. To maintain the morale of the strikers, articles exude optimism and confidence, commending the worker's "wonderful response", encouraging "All's Well". The paper persistently attempts to ensure calm and order among the strikers by offering guidelines to occupy oneself, perhaps through "Do's for Difficult Days" or through "Sports for the Masses". It further ensured that government claims of illegality and revolution were rebuffed by repeating messages and countering claims. These objectives were to be the only focus of the newspaper. The Publicity Committee refused the inclusion of general news as they did not want anything to detract from the defence of the strike. However, a small weather summary was inserted on the front page in the third issue.

== Competition with British Gazette ==
The general strike had forced the closure of most printing presses, allowing the British Worker and the British Gazette to engage the country's readership with little competition. The production of a government and TUC newspaper revealed how the situation had polarised, representing the strike division, with both attempting to appeal to the public through propagandist methods.

The Gazette attacked the TUC leaders for an "Assault on Rights of the Nation" and the thread of possible revolutionary panic radiated in articles, detailing ominous predictions of ruin:

"rumours would poison the air, raise panics and disorders, inflame fears and passions together, and carry us all to depths which no sane man of any party or class would care even to contemplate."

Such inflammatory accusations are widely discredited as great falsifications and provocations. However this stance changed during the course of the strike so that towards the end of the stoppage, the Gazette ceased proclamations of democracy in danger.

The Worker was less inclined to prevarication, and possibly had the better of the polemical arguments as it successfully rejected government accusations by giving more reassurance to its readers. Every edition carried a boxed, bold message to deliberately counter government claims:

The General Council does NOT challenge the Constitution. It is not seeking to substitute unconstitutional government. Nor is it desirous of undermining our Parliamentary institutions. The sole aim of the Council is to secure the miners a decent standard of life. The Council is engaged in an Industrial dispute. There is no Constitutional crisis.

== Legacy: success or failure? ==
The British Worker was widely credited by contemporaries for its efficient production, neat appearance and moderate opinions. However it has been criticised for its tedious tone and the exclusion of general news. The way in which the General Council controlled its newspaper therefore restricted its appeal: if they had created a newspaper that supported the strike, yet included general news, it might have been read by a wider audience. Instead it was read by those already convinced of the justice of the striker's cause.

The Gazette however boasted a wider appeal as it could address the whole nation. Despite its intemperate tone and falsifications, the Gazette was particularly influential in forming opinion outside London as the British Worker could not effectively counter across the country because of distribution problems. The circulation figures confirm the Gazette's greater attraction as it posted circulation figures of 2.2 million on 12 May, compared to the Worker's peak production of 700,000 copies. Furthermore, most London national newspapers resumed production during the strike and although appeared in truncated form, most were powerfully opposed to the strike. Therefore, the TUC possessed only the British Worker to counter all strike resistance. The use of radio broadcasting through the BBC, although restrained by the government, was more ruthless and effective in disseminating news and information to the public.

== Bibliography ==
- Griffiths, D. A. A History of the NPA: 1906-2006 (London: Newspapers Publishers Association, 2006)
- Morris, M. The General Strike (London: Journeyman Press, 1980)
- Phillips, G. A. The General Strike: The Politics of Industrial Conflict (London: Weidenfeld and Nicolson, 1976)
- Robertson, D. H. 'A Narrative of the General Strike of 1926' The Economic Journal Vol. 36, No. 143 (September 1926)
- Symons, J. The General Strike (London: The Cresset Press, 1957)
