= British Gazette =

1926 British Government newspaper

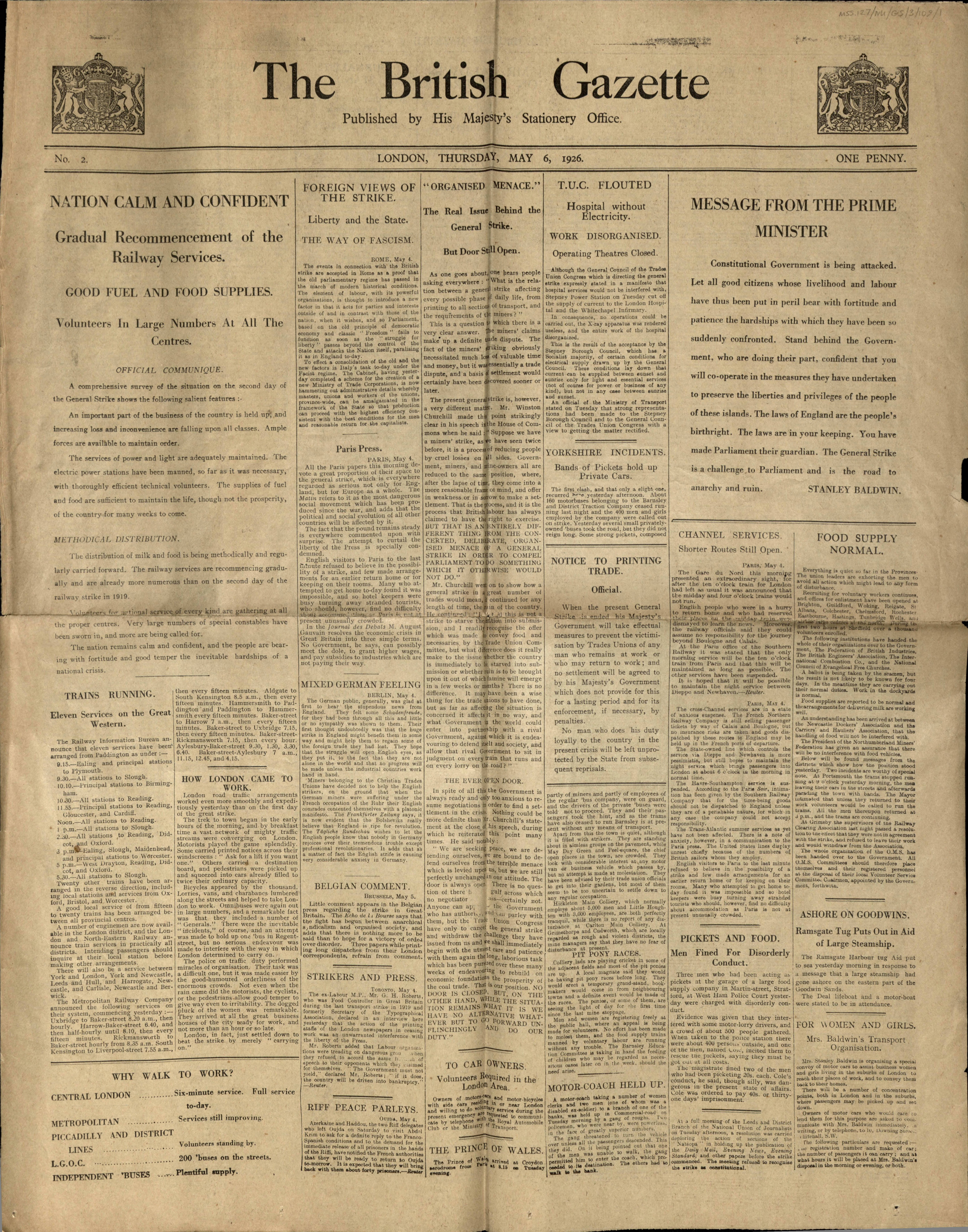
- Type: Daily newspaper
- Format: Broadsheet
- Owner: HM Government
- Editor: Winston Churchill
- Founded: 5 May 1926
- Ceased publication: 13 May 1926
- Political alignment: Opposition to the General Strike
- Circulation: 200,000 to 2 million

The British Gazette was a short-lived British state newspaper published by the government during the General Strike of 1926.

One of the first groups of workers called out by the Trades Union Congress when the general strike began on 3 May were the printers, and consequently most national newspapers appeared only in truncated form during the strike. In order to present its point of view, the government decided to produce an official anti-strike newspaper, to be published by His Majesty's Stationery Office. The Gazette was based out of the offices of the conservative Morning Post, selected because the site could not be easily blocked by strikers. It was run by a mix of government employees and staff from the Morning Post and Daily Express. Chancellor of the Exchequer Winston Churchill, a former journalist, was appointed the paper's editor and wrote much of its material.

The Gazette first appeared on the morning of 5 May. It was highly condemnatory of the strike and was open that it had no editorial independence. The TUC produced its own newspaper, the British Worker (subtitled Official Strike News Edition), however they were unable to match the government's ability to produce and distribute the Gazette, with the Gazette's circulation rising as high as 2,000,000. From issue 4, the masthead contained the invitation "Please pass on this copy or display it". The Gazette ran to only eight editions before the strike collapsed; the last edition, on 13 May 1926, had the headline "General Strike Off".

On 7 July 1926, at the end of a debate in Parliament on whether to grant the money to pay for the British Gazette, Churchill responded to Labour MP A. A. Purcell's speculation about what would happen in future general strikes with the words "Make your minds perfectly clear that if ever you let loose upon us again a general strike, we will loose upon you (pause) another British Gazette!" The statement drew laughter and applause from both sides and defused some of the lingering political tension in the debate.
