= Samuel Commission =

1925 UK Royal Commission

The Samuel Commission was a Royal Commission set up by the United Kingdom Prime Minister, Stanley Baldwin in 1925 to look into the mining industry. It took its name from Herbert Samuel, the former High Commissioner of Palestine who had just returned to the United Kingdom. The Samuel Commission opposed nationalisation and recommended the government cut the wages of miners by 13.5%, contributing to the 1926 general strike.

The Royal Warrant for the Commission was issued on 5 September 1925 with visits to coal mines arranged for late September and early October. The first public sitting was held on 15 October 1925.
