= Meanwhile (novel) =

1927 novel by H. G. Wells

Meanwhile (The Picture of a Lady)
- First edition
- Author: H. G. Wells
- Language: English
- Publisher: Ernest Benn
- Publication date: 1927
- Publication place: United Kingdom
- Pages: 320

Meanwhile is a 1927 novel by H. G. Wells set in an Italian villa early in 1926.

== Plot summary ==
Meanwhile is divided into two books: "The Utopographer in the Garden" and "Advent".

In the first book, Cynthia and Philip Rylands, a wealthy British couple, are entertaining guests at Casa Terragena, an Italian villa with a famous garden on the Italian Riviera. Among the party are a prominent author, "the great Mr. Sempack," an American aesthete, Mr. Plantagenet-Buchan, the beautiful, vivacious Lady Catherine, Col. and Mrs. Bullace, Lady Grieswold, and a number of others. At dinner, Sempack, a brilliant talker with ideas similar to Wells's, expounds the idea that a "Great Age" is certain to come, and that contemporaries are obliged in the present to live, as it were, "meanwhile": "Since nothing was in order, nothing was completely right. We lived provisionally. There was no just measure of economic worth; we had to live unjustly .... We were justified in taking life as we found it; in return if we had ease and freedom we ought to do all that we could to increase knowledge and bring the great days of a common world-order nearer, a universal justice, the real civilisation, the consummating life, the days that would justify the Martyrdom of Man."

A crisis is precipitated when Cynthia Rylands, who is pregnant with her first child, surprised her husband engaged in a dalliance "in the little bathing chalet" with one of their guests, a Miss Clarges. She is distraught and confides in Sempack, who offers her wise advice in a long letter: she should not forgive her husband, but rather "realize that there is nothing to forgive." Mrs. Rylands accepts Sempack's notion that her husband's real problem is not infidelity but idleness, and the first book ends with him departing at her urging for a visit to England, where his family's vast coal holdings are at risk in the crisis that culminated in the 1926 general strike.

The novel's second "book" is dominated by Philip Rylands's letters describing the British political situation ("many of the leading participants in the strike appear in the novel without disguise") and his recruitment to the Open Conspiracy, Wells's plan for establishing a World Republic. But it is also punctuated with a number of subplots, some comic, some dramatic. Lady Catherine undertakes the seduction of an unwilling Mr. Sempack, but before this affair can be consummated, she flees to join a British fascist committed to fighting the class war back at home. Mrs. McManus, a nurse from Ulster who comes to assist Mrs. Rylands in the last stages of her pregnancy, is a memorable comic character. And Mrs. Rylands, with the help of Mrs. McManus, comes heroically to the aid of Signor Vinciguerra, a liberal Italian leader being hunted by Italian fascists in her garden; she succeeds in helping him escape to France. Meanwhile concludes with the return of a now devoted, engagé Philip to Cynthia after she has given birth to their son.

== Commercial success ==
Meanwhile was chosen as an alternate selection of the recently founded Book of the Month Club and was translated into a number of languages, including Danish, Norwegian, Polish, and Czech. In England, 30,000 copies sold within two months, and by the summer of 1929 50,000 had been sold.

== Criticism ==
Bertrand Russell read Meanwhile "with the most complete sympathy" and told Wells he agreed with it entirely. Beatrice Webb called it an "inspiring essay." Wells's concept of the Open Conspiracy was taken seriously in its day, and he developed it in a book-length treatment published in the following year, discussing it with Lloyd George, Harold Macmillan, Harold Nicolson, and many others.

Meanwhile is regarded variously by later critics. Writing in the 1980s, David C. Smith considered the novel "badly neglected" and praised "excellent descriptions of the rich on the Riviera just before the deluge, as well as a poignant and sharp analysis of the fascist system under stress" and "a strong statement of the Open Conspiracy." But Wells's most recent biographer, Michael Sherborne, judged it "not a successful novel" whose "dull characters ... share predictable views about the state of the world and engage in token romantic entanglements." Some biographies do not mention it at all.
