= Canadian Mineworkers Union =

Canadian trade union

The Canadian Mineworkers Union (CMU) was a Canadian trade union of coal miners based in Cape Breton Island, Nova Scotia. Although it never won an election or legally represented workers, it was part of an important movement among Canadian unions in the 1980s to break away from their international American counterparts.

The CMU is distinguished from a local, independent union of the same name which existed at the Clinton Creek mine in the Yukon. This local union, which existed from late 1972 into 1978, was formed when miners decertified the United Steel Workers of America and formed their own union.

== Miners' unions in Nova Scotia ==
Coal miners in Nova Scotia were first organized by the Provincial Workmen's Association (PWA) in 1879. The United Mine Workers of America (UMWA) attempted to organize the miners and supplant the PWA in 1908. The two unions fought for control, but in 1917 joined forces and formed the Amalgamated Mine Workers of Nova Scotia. The Amalgamated affiliated fully with UMWA a year later. Miners were represented continuously by UMWA over the next 60 years, with strikes exceedingly rare.

== 1981 strike and formation ==
On July 17, 1981, 3,500 miners in the Cape Breton coalfields went on strike against the Cape Breton Development Corporation (DEVCO), seeking a 60 percent wage increase over two years. It was the first strike since the nationalization of the Nova Scotia mines in 1967. But after a three-month-long strike in the spring of 1981, UMWA had little money left in it international union strike fund. The Nova Scotia miners were angry that UMWA was unable to support their strike, but nevertheless remained on the picket line. To support the strike effort, the local union organized a United Mine Workers Wives Association to raise funds and provide food, financial support, and other charity for strikers' families. The 13-week strike was a bitter one. When the Cabinet of Canadian Prime Minister Pierre Trudeau met in Sydney, Nova Scotia, in early September 1981, striking miners forced their way onto the tarmac and cornered Finance Minister Allan MacEachen and External Affairs Minister Mark MacGuigan to demand an end to the strike. Three federal mediators attempted to negotiate an end to the strike, and three times the miners rejected tentative contracts (the last one proposing a 50 percent wage hike over three years). Vandalism against company property began in August, and quickly escalated. In mid-September, a bomb was detonated at a DEVCO mine and DEVCO coal rail cars derailed at DEVCO's Lingan mine in New Waterford. A fourth federal mediator arrived just days after the bombings. The strike finally ended on October 3, 1981, with a tentative agreement which raised wages 50 percent over two years. The pact was ratified by the union a few days later.

Seething over the international union's inability to fund the strike, dissident miners attempted to organize their own union with the help and support of the Confederation of Canadian Unions (CCU). Miner Archie Kennedy contacted CCU Secretary-Treasurer John Lang and asked for assistance. Lang dispatched organizers John St. Amand and Sue Vohanka to Cape Breton to organize a union. The attempt to decertify the United Mine Workers and replace it with a new organization was part of a larger movement among Canadian labour unions to split away from their parent American "international" unions. Widespread discontent existed over the amount of dues sent to union headquarters in the U.S. (many Canadian unions called them "profits") and the relatively minor attention given to the problems of Canadian workers in return.

The CCU founded the Canadian Mineworkers Union, and began an organizing campaign in late 1981. Roughly half the Cape Breton miners joined the CMU, forcing a federally supervised union election. The Cape Breton miners voted 1,750 to 1,393 in March 1983 against affiliating with the CMU. The election was seen as a victory for UMWA president Richard Trumka. Trumka had defeated incumbent Sam Church for the international union presidency in the fall of 1982, and observers felt Cape Breton miners wanted to give the international union a second chance. But the CCU and CMU continued their organizing efforts. Member anger over the level of service given by UMWA remained high, and CMU forced a second election in March 1984. The miners rejected CMU a second time by a vote of 1,795 to 1,242. CMU's support declined quickly thereafter, as miners became disenchanted with the constant campaigning for votes.

The Canadian Mineworkers Union elected Donald MacLellan its national president at its founding convention. Dave Odo was elected vice president, Joe MacNeil the general secretary, and Allan MacDonald the treasurer.

UMWA continued to represent miners on Cape Breton Island for the next 17 years. All the island's coal mines were closed in 2001, and the local union disbanded.
