= Keith Laybourn =

British professor of history (born 1946)

- Born: 13 March 1946; Barnsley, England, United Kingdom of Great Britain and Ireland
- Occupations: Historian, Professor
- Known for: Labour history

Keith Laybourn FRHistS FHEA (born 13 March 1946) is Diamond Jubilee Professor of the University of Huddersfield and professor of history. He is a British historian of the late nineteenth and early twentieth century specialising in labour history and the working class in Britain. He has published extensively, and has authored over 51 books on subjects including women's history, social policy and administration, and policing. In 2012 he took over presidency of the Society for the Study of Labour History following the death of the previous president, Eric Hobsbawm. He has also appeared on television, including Who Do You Think You Are? In 2016 he signed a public letter along with many other academic historians opposing Brexit.

Laybourn was born in Barnsley, South Yorkshire on the 13th March 1946 and is married with three children (Rosie, Peter and Lizzie). He lives in Leeds, West Yorkshire.

== Select bibliography ==
- The Rise of Socialism in Britain (Sutton Publishing Ltd 1997)
- Britain on the Breadline: A Social and Political History of Britain, 1918-39 (Sutton Publishing Ltd; New edition 1998)
- Under the Red Flag: The History of Communism in Britain. Stroud: Sutton Publishing, 1999.
- Marxism in Britain: Dissent, Decline and Re-emergence 1945-c.2000. Oxon: Routledge, 2006.
- The Battle for the Roads of Britain: Police, Motorists and the Law, c. 1890 to 1970 (Palgrave Macmillan, 2015).
- Going to the Dogs: A History of Greyhound Racing in Britain, 1926-2017 (Manchester University Press, 2019)
