= List of Upstairs, Downstairs episodes =

Upstairs, Downstairs is a British television drama series created by Jean Marsh and Eileen Atkins, and developed by Alfred Shaughnessy for London Weekend Television. The series consists of 68 hour-long episodes that aired in the United Kingdom on ITV from 1971 to 1975, in Ireland on RTÉ from 1972 to 1976 and in the United States as part of Masterpiece Theatre on PBS from 1974 to 1977. It was eventually broadcast in over 70 countries to an audience of over one billion viewers.

The series is set during the period 1903–1930 and takes place largely in the London town house of the Bellamy family. The "upstairs" and "downstairs" of the title refers to, respectively, the Bellamys and their servants. The first season introduced David Langton as Richard Bellamy, Rachel Gurney as his wife, Marjorie, Nicola Pagett as their daughter, Elizabeth, and Simon Williams as their son, James. The household servants were Gordon Jackson as Angus Hudson (the butler), Angela Baddeley as Mrs Bridges (the cook), Jean Marsh as Rose Buck (the head maid), Pauline Collins as Sarah Moffat (maid), Patsy Smart as Maude Roberts (Lady Marjorie Bellamy's personal maid), Christopher Beeny as Edward (first servant), and George Innes as Alfred (the footman). In the second series Jenny Tomasin was introduced as Ruby (a kitchen/scullery maid) and George Innes was replaced by John Alderton as Thomas Watkins. Alderton and Pauline Collins later played their characters in a spin-off series, Thomas and Sarah.

Rachel Gurney and Nicola Pagett both left the show after the second series. The third series introduced Meg Wynn Owen as Hazel Forrest, Lesley-Anne Down as Georgina Worsley (Richard Bellamy's "niece" – the stepdaughter of Lady Marjorie's late brother Hugo), and Jacqueline Tong as Daisy Peel (another maid). Owen was dropped from the cast after the fourth series and replaced in the fifth by Hannah Gordon as Virginia Hamilton, who becomes Richard Bellamy's second wife. Anthony Andrews also became a regular in the fifth series in the role of Lord Robert Stockbridge, as did Karen Dotrice as Lily Hawkins, another maid in the Bellamy household.

During its run Upstairs, Downstairs won two BAFTA Awards, seven Emmys, and a Peabody and Golden Globe Award. The complete series has been released on DVD in regions one, two, and four.

== Series overview ==
| Series | Episodes | Originally released | |
| Series | Episodes | First released | Last released |
|---|---|---|---|
| 1 | 13 | 10 October 1971 | 20 March 1972 |
| 2 | 13 | 21 October 1972 | 19 January 1973 |
| 3 | 13 | 27 October 1973 | 19 January 1974 |
| 4 | 13 | 14 September 1974 | 7 December 1974 |
| 5 | 16 | 7 September 1975 | 21 December 1975 |

== Episodes ==
A total of 68 hour-long episodes were produced and broadcast during the original run of Upstairs, Downstairs. They are listed in order of their original airing in the UK.

=== Series 1 (1971–72) ===
The first series is set from November 1903 to June 1908 and consists of 13 episodes that aired in two separate sections (October–November 1971 and January–March 1972). For this series the show won the BAFTA for Best Drama.

The first six episodes were made in black and white due to a strike at the ITV companies. When colour facilities became available again midway through production of the series, London Weekend Television remade the first episode in colour at the end of the first series block, thus making the series more marketable for overseas broadcasts. The original black-and-white version was subsequently destroyed. Two colour versions of the episode were edited, with the episode intended for overseas broadcast showing Sarah (Pauline Collins) leaving Eaton Place (as she does in "Board Wages") to maintain the series' continuity with the black-and-white episodes omitted.

For original showings in the United States, three episodes from the first British series and ten from the second were merged into a single season of 13 episodes. These 13 episodes that were shown in the US were the Series 1 episodes 1, 10 and 13, and the Series 2 episodes 1, 2, 4, 5, 8, 9, 10, 11, 12 and 13. The 13 unused episodes in the US from the first two series were eventually shown in the autumn/fall of 1988 under the banner "The Missing Episodes".

| No. overall | No. in series | Title | Directed by | Written by | Original release date |
|---|---|---|---|---|---|
| 1 | 1 | "On Trial" | Raymond Menmuir | Fay Weldon | 10 October 1971 |
November 1903: Lady Marjorie hires newcomer Sarah Moffat as a parlour maid on a trial basis.
| 2 | 2 | "The Mistress and the Maids" | Derek Bennett | Alfred Shaughnessy | 17 October 1971; 1989 in the US |
June 1904: Richard hires a Bohemian artist, Scone (Anton Rodgers), to paint a portrait of Lady Marjorie, but Scone becomes interested in painting Sarah in the nude.
| 3 | 3 | "Board Wages" | Derek Bennett | Terence Brady & Charlotte Bingham | 24 October 1971; 1989 in the US |
In August 1904, the Bellamys are away summering in Scotland. The senior servants are also away. The junior servants carouse drunkenly through the house and mock their employers whilst dressed up as the family. They are caught by James Bellamy (Simon Williams), the son of the family, who takes on the role of butler. Sarah continues her mocking and James kisses her. He promises not to disclose her misbehaviour. After this Sarah Moffat, annoyed by James's high-handed attitude, leaves Eaton Place.
| 4 | 4 | "The Path of Duty" | Joan Kemp-Welch | John Harrison | 31 October 1971; 1989 in the US |
In May, 1905 Elizabeth Bellamy (Nicola Pagett), introduced in this episode, returns from studying in Germany. She wants to make the entrée into London society and her society debut. She has an abundance of "radical" notions and a noncomformist behaviour. During her first society ball, at which she is to be presented to King Edward VII she runs away.
| 5 | 5 | "A Suitable Marriage" | Joan Kemp-Welch | Jeremy Paul | 7 November 1971; 1989 in the US |
In December 1905, Elizabeth Bellamy falls in love with Baron Klaus von Rimmer, a German who turns out to be homosexual. He claims to be in Britain to work in his family's bank but that doesn't fool Richard. The Baron eventually admits to being an arms dealer who wants to sell a new naval gun mount to the British. Richard realizes exactly what he's up to - especially after the Baron offers him a bribe. Before the police arrive to arrest him for arms dealing, he flees Eaton Place with the footman Alfred to Germany after they are caught by Rose in a compromising situation (i.e. having sexual relations.) Not wishing Elizabeth to know any of the real reasons for his departure, she is told that he is a spy. The ″baron fled, dumping Elizabeth and taking Alfred with him instead!″
| 6 | 6 | "A Cry for Help" | Derek Bennett | Julian Bond | 14 November 1971; 1989 in the US |
In 1906 Lady Marjorie Bellamy leaves with Rose for the country, but while Rose is gone the new under-house-parlour maid, Mary Stokes, arrives in service pregnant. She says that she has found herself pregnant after being sexually assaulted and raped by Myles Radford, the son of Mary's previous employer and Richard's powerful politician and family friend. Richard Bellamy takes pity on Mary and attempts to help her. But the Radfords refuse to take responsibility and the legal system proves ineffective. Richard finds himself threatened with legal action if he continues with his accusations against Radford and finds himself facing rumours that he was the father. Sir Geoffrey tells Richard to send Mary away, so she quits her job with the Bellamys, but she departs with a small gift of money from some of the servants.
| 7 | 7 | "Magic Casements" | Joan Kemp-Welch | John Hawkesworth | 23 January 1972; 1989 in the US |
Lady Marjorie has an affair with Charles Hammond, a friend of her son James.
| 8 | 8 | "I Dies from Love" | Raymond Menmuir | Terence Brady & Charlotte Bingham | 30 January 1972; 1989 in the US |
| 9 | 9 | "Why Is Her Door Locked?" | Brian Parker | Alfred Shaughnessy | 6 February 1972; 1989 in the US |
| 10 | 10 | "A Voice from the Past" | Raymond Menmuir | Jeremy Paul | 13 February 1972 |
| 11 | 11 | "The Swedish Tiger" | Brian Parker | Raymond Bowers | 20 February 1972; 1989 in the US |
| 12 | 12 | "The Key of the Door" | Raymond Menmuir | John Hawkesworth & Alfred Shaughnessy | 27 February 1972; 1989 in the US |
| 13 | 13 | "For Love of Love" | Herbert Wise | Rosemary Anne Sisson | 20 March 1972 |

=== Series 2 (1972–73) ===
For its second series Upstairs, Downstairs is set from 1908 to 1910. As with the first series a total of 13 episodes were produced. This time all were made in colour. As mentioned above, the first season broadcast in the United States was a conglomeration of three and ten episodes from, respectively, the first and second British series. For its first American season, Upstairs, Downstairs won the 1974 Emmy Award for Outstanding Drama Series while Jean Marsh was nominated for an Emmy as Best Lead Actress in a Drama Series.

| No. overall | No. in series | Title | Directed by | Written by | Original release date |
|---|---|---|---|---|---|
| 14 | 1 | "The New Man" | Raymond Menmuir | Rosemary Anne Sisson | 21 October 1972 |
| 15 | 2 | "A Pair of Exiles" | Cyril Coke | Alfred Shaughnessy | 28 October 1972 |
| 16 | 3 | "Married Love" | Raymond Menmuir | John Harrison | 4 November 1972; 1989 in the US |
| 17 | 4 | "Whom God Hath Joined..." | Bill Bain | Jeremy Paul | 10 November 1972 |
| 18 | 5 | "Guest of Honour" | Bill Bain | Alfred Shaughnessy | 17 November 1972 |
King Edward VII attends a dinner party hosted by the Bellamys on the same night that Sarah turns up in labour with James's baby.
| 19 | 6 | "The Property of a Lady" | Derek Bennett | Alfred Shaughnessy | 24 November 1972; 1989 in the US |
| 20 | 7 | "Your Obedient Servant" | Derek Bennett | Fay Weldon | 1 December 1972; 1989 in the US |
| 21 | 8 | "Out of the Everywhere" | Christopher Hodson | Terence Brady & Charlotte Bingham | 8 December 1972 |
| 22 | 9 | "An Object of Value" | Raymond Menmuir | Jeremy Paul | 15 December 1972 |
| 23 | 10 | "A Special Mischief" | Raymond Menmuir | Anthony Skene | 29 December 1972 |
| 24 | 11 | "The Fruits of Love" | Christopher Hodson | John Hawkesworth | 5 January 1973 |
Set in the summer of 1909, Elizabeth Wallace, formerly Elizabeth Kirbridge née Elizabeth Bellamy, (b. 1887) is the daughter of Richard and Lady Marjorie Bellamy and the sister of James. Julius Karekin is a wealthy Armenian gentleman and businessman and he is Elizabeth's new lover. Julius successfully manages the stocks Elizabeth inherited from a recently deceased great-aunt and buys her a hat shop in Mayfair's Brook Street to manage. She renames it Madame Yvonne. Her parents don't like Julius and they don't want to receive him. To further his influence, Karekin buys the lease on 165 Eaton Place. The £5600 lease is put up for sale upon Lord Southwold's death in 1909. He offers the lease to Elizabeth to help save her parents from eviction. She then gives the deed to her parents. He uses her to further his career and contacts. Owing to Richard Bellamy's connections, he becomes a good friend of Arthur Balfour, a financial adviser to the Tory Party, and a candidate for membership in the exclusive Pall Mall men's club, the Athenaeum.
| 25 | 12 | "The Wages of Sin" | Christopher Hodson | Anthony Skene | 12 January 1973 |
| 26 | 13 | "A Family Gathering" | Raymond Menmuir | Alfred Shaughnessy | 19 January 1973 |

=== Series 3 (1973–74) ===
The third series is set in the pre-World War I era of 1912–1914 and consists of 13 colour episodes. For this series Upstairs, Downstairs won the BAFTA for Best Drama Series and the Emmy and Golden Globe Awards for Outstanding Drama Series. Jean Marsh won the Emmy for Outstanding Lead Actress in a Drama Series and a Golden Globe nomination for Best Actress in a drama. Angela Baddeley was nominated for Emmy for the Outstanding Continuing Performance by a Supporting Actress.

| No. overall | No. in series | Title | Directed by | Written by | Original release date |
|---|---|---|---|---|---|
| 27 | 1 | "Miss Forrest" | Bill Bain | Alfred Shaughnessy | 27 October 1973 |
| 28 | 2 | "A House Divided" | Christopher Hodson | Rosemary Anne Sisson | 3 November 1973 |
| 29 | 3 | "A Change of Scene" | Bill Bain | Rosemary Anne Sisson | 10 November 1973 |
| 30 | 4 | "A Family Secret" | Derek Bennett | Alfred Shaughnessy | 17 November 1973 |
| 31 | 5 | "Rose's Pigeon" | Bill Bain | Jeremy Paul | 24 November 1973 |
| 32 | 6 | "Desirous of Change" | Lionel Harris | Fay Weldon | 1 December 1973 |
| 33 | 7 | "Word of Honour" | Christopher Hodson | Anthony Skene | 8 December 1973 |
| 34 | 8 | "The Bolter" | Cyril Coke | John Hawkesworth | 15 December 1973 |
| 35 | 9 | "Goodwill to All Men" | Christopher Hodson | Alfred Shaughnessy & Deborah Mortimer | 22 December 1973 |
| 36 | 10 | "What the Footman Saw" | Cyril Coke | Jeremy Paul | 29 December 1973 |
| 37 | 11 | "A Perfect Stranger" | Christopher Hodson | Jeremy Paul | 5 January 1974 |
| 38 | 12 | "Distant Thunder" | Bill Bain | Alfred Shaughnessy | 12 January 1974 |
| 39 | 13 | "The Sudden Storm" | Bill Bain | John Hawkesworth | 19 January 1974 |

=== Series 4 (1974) ===
Series Four of Upstairs, Downstairs is set during the period of World War I (1914–1918) and consists of 13 colour episodes. This series won an Emmy for Outstanding Limited Series, and Gordon Jackson won the Primetime Emmy Award for Outstanding Guest Actor in a Drama Series. Jean Marsh, Angela Baddeley and Christopher Hodson received Emmy nominations for, respectively, Outstanding Lead Actress in a Drama Series, Outstanding Continuing Performance by a Supporting Actress, and Outstanding Directing in a Drama Series.

| No. overall | No. in series | Title | Directed by | Written by | Original release date |
|---|---|---|---|---|---|
| 40 | 1 | "A Patriotic Offering" | Derek Bennett | Rosemary Anne Sisson | 14 September 1974 |
| 41 | 2 | "News from the Front" | Derek Bennett | John Hawkesworth | 21 September 1974 |
| 42 | 3 | "The Beastly Hun" | Bill Bain | Jeremy Paul | 28 September 1974 |
| 43 | 4 | "Women Shall Not Weep" | Christopher Hodson | Alfred Shaughnessy | 5 October 1974 |
| 44 | 5 | "Tug of War" | Derek Bennett | Rosemary Anne Sisson | 12 October 1974 |
| 45 | 6 | "Home Fires" | Bill Bain | Jeremy Paul | 19 October 1974 |
| 46 | 7 | "If You Were the Only Girl in the World" | Raymond Menmuir | John Hawkesworth | 26 October 1974 |
| 47 | 8 | "The Glorious Dead" | Raymond Menmuir | Alfred Shaughnessy & Elizabeth Jane Howard | 2 November 1974 |
| 48 | 9 | "Another Year" | Cyril Coke | Alfred Shaughnessy | 9 November 1974 |
| 49 | 10 | "The Hero's Farewell" | Bill Bain | Rosemary Anne Sisson | 16 November 1974 |
| 50 | 11 | "Missing Believed Killed" | Christopher Hodson | Jeremy Paul | 23 November 1974 |
| 51 | 12 | "Facing Fearful Odds" | Raymond Menmuir | John Hawkesworth | 30 November 1974 |
| 52 | 13 | "Peace out of Pain" | Christopher Hodson | Alfred Shaughnessy | 7 December 1974 |

=== Series 5 (1975) ===
The fifth and final series is set in the post-war period of 1919–1930 and consists of 16 colour episodes. Once again Upstairs, Downstairs won an Emmy for Outstanding Drama Series while Jacqueline Tong received a nomination for Outstanding Continuing Performance by a Supporting Actress in a Drama Series. The series also received a Peabody Award for this season.

| No. overall | No. in series | Title | Directed by | Written by | Original release date |
|---|---|---|---|---|---|
| 53 | 1 | "On With the Dance" | Bill Bain | Alfred Shaughnessy | 7 September 1975 |
| 54 | 2 | "A Place in the World" | Christopher Hodson | Jeremy Paul | 14 September 1975 |
| 55 | 3 | "Laugh a Little Louder Please" | Derek Bennett | Rosemary Anne Sisson | 21 September 1975 |
| 56 | 4 | "The Joy Ride" | Bill Bain | Alfred Shaughnessy | 28 September 1975 |
| 57 | 5 | "Wanted - A Good Home" | Christopher Hodson | John Hawkesworth | 5 October 1975 |
| 58 | 6 | "An Old Flame" | Derek Bennett | John Hawkesworth | 12 October 1975 |
| 59 | 7 | "Disillusion" | Bill Bain | Alfred Shaughnessy | 19 October 1975 |
| 60 | 8 | "Such a Lovely Man" | Christopher Hodson | Rosemary Anne Sisson | 26 October 1975 |
| 61 | 9 | "The Nine Days Wonder" | Simon Langton | Jeremy Paul | 2 November 1975 |
| 62 | 10 | "The Understudy" | James Ormerod | Jeremy Paul | 9 November 1975 |
| 63 | 11 | "Alberto" | Christopher Hodson | Alfred Shaughnessy | 16 November 1975 |
| 64 | 12 | "Will Ye No Come Back Again" | Bill Bain | Rosemary Anne Sisson | 23 November 1975 |
| 65 | 13 | "Joke Over" | Bill Bain | Rosemary Anne Sisson | 30 November 1975 |
| 66 | 14 | "Noblesse Oblige" | Cyril Coke | John Hawkesworth | 7 December 1975 |
| 67 | 15 | "All the King's Horses" | Simon Langton | Jeremy Paul | 14 December 1975 |
| 68 | 16 | "Whither Shall I Wander?" | Bill Bain | John Hawkesworth | 21 December 1975 |
