= The Swedish Tiger =

- Upstairs, Downstairs episode
- Episode no.: Season 1 Episode 11
- Directed by: Brian Parker
- Written by: Raymond Bowers
- Original air date: 20 February 1972

Guest appearances
- Geoffrey Whitehead (Captain Axel Ryttsen); Sven-Bertil Taube (Torkel Kraft); Peter Clay (The Jeweller); Gillian Lind (Flossie); Dorothy Black (Flo); Veronica Lang (The Jeweller's Wife); Colin Rix (The Policeman); Rex Robinson (Inspector Hurst); Doel Luscombe (The Art Dealer)

Episode chronology
← Previous "A Voice from the Past"	Next → "The Key of the Door"

"The Swedish Tiger" is the eleventh episode of the first series of the British television series, Upstairs, Downstairs. The episode is set in October 1908.

"The Swedish Tiger" was among the episodes omitted from Upstairs, Downstairs initial Masterpiece Theatre broadcast in 1974, and was consequently not shown on US television until 1989.

A website dedicated to the series considers it the weakest episode of the series, due to its muddled dialogue and confusing nature.

== Plot ==
In October 1908, James Bellamy has invited a dashing Swedish military officer, Axel Ryttsen, to 165 Eaton Place. Sarah Moffat falls in love with Ryttsen's valet, Torkel Kraft. Kraft removes valuable household objects from the Bellamy house in order to pay off Ryttsen's gambling debts. They use Sarah as a patsy. Sarah thinks that she is helping Kraft who promises her that he will take her to Sweden. But Ryttsen and Kraft leave Sarah alone with the music: "one hapless servant girl who will certainly be dismissed".

== Cast ==
Regular cast

- Nicola Pagett (Elizabeth Bellamy)
- Simon Williams (James Bellamy)
- Pauline Collins (Sarah)
- Christopher Beeny (Edward)

Guest cast

- Geoffrey Whitehead (Captain Axel Ryttsen)
- Sven-Bertil Taube (Torkel Kraft)
- Peter Clay (The Jeweller)
- Gillian Lind (Flossie)
- Dorothy Black (Flo)
- Veronica Lang (The Jeweller's Wife)
- Colin Rix (The Policeman)
- Rex Robinson (Inspector Hurst)
- Doel Luscombe (The Art Dealer)
