= A Family Gathering =

- Upstairs, Downstairs episode
- Episode no.: Season 2 Episode 13
- Directed by: Raymond Menmuir
- Written by: Alfred Shaughnessy
- Original air date: 19 January 1973

Episode chronology
← Previous "The Wages of Sin"	Next → "Miss Forrest"

"A Family Gathering" is the thirteenth episode of the second series of the British television series, Upstairs, Downstairs. The episode is set in 1910.

== Plot ==
Julius Karekin is a very savvy, opportunistic, wealthy businessman who uses Elizabeth to gain access to her father and his government connections. Elizabeth Bellamy fails to read her true situation, seeing the gift as loving support of her new-found equality: Her relationship with Julius Karekin fizzles out when after a few months he starts a relationship with a Marchioness. He always made it clear that he was a philanderer. Elizabeth is last seen celebrating Lady Marjorie's birthday.

James Bellamy returns from India just before his mother's birthday on 6 May 1910 (which coincides with the death of King Edward VII), and brings with him his brash and gushing fiancée, Phyllis, the daughter of an army vet. At his mother's birthday James sees Sarah Moffat, who returned to visit the servants and to give Lady Marjorie a birthday present, on 6 May 1910. The subsequent celebration downstairs ended when the news of Edward VII's death broke.

== Cast ==
Guest cast

- Nicola Pagett (Elizabeth Kirbridge)
- Donald Burton (Julius Karekin)
- Mairhi Russell (Mademoiselle Jeanette)
