= A Voice from the Past =

- Upstairs, Downstairs episode
- Episode no.: Season 1 Episode 10
- Directed by: Raymond Menmuir
- Written by: Jeremy Paul
- Original air date: 13 February 1972

Episode chronology
← Previous "Why Is Her Door Locked?"	Next → "The Swedish Tiger"

"A Voice from the Past" is the tenth episode of the first series of the British television series, Upstairs, Downstairs.

== Plot ==
In Autumn 1908, Sarah Moffat was discovered starving and destitute in a soup kitchen in Whitechapel by Elizabeth Bellamy and James Bellamy. Elizabeth insisted on taking Sarah back to Eaton Place, and installed her as scullery maid, the only vacant position. Sarah was not happy with this, and determined to become under house parlour maid again. She managed to upset Alice (the under house parlourmaid) so Alice left, and Sarah then became under house parlourmaid. Sarah is sad to hear of Emily's death. She claims to be a medium and she says that she has acquired psychic powers during her time out of service. (In 1900 she was taken in by a spiritualist medium called Lydia Pagenell, who lived in Bloomsbury. Sarah then worked as Miss Pagenell's assistant for three and a half years until someone reported them for fraud, and they were both sent to Holloway Prison in October 1903. Miss Pagenell died weeks later in prison, while Sarah was released on 1 November 1903). Sarah leads a séance and tries to conjure up Emily's spirit and claims to conjure Emily's ghost. They hear Emily's voice from the past during the séance in which Sarah relays Emily's forgiveness to Mrs. Bridges.
