= The Mistress and the Maids =

- Upstairs, Downstairs episode
- Episode no.: Season 1 Episode 2
- Directed by: Derek Bennett
- Written by: Alfred Shaughnessy
- Original air date: 17 October 1971

Episode chronology
← Previous "On Trial"	Next → "Board Wages"

"The Mistress and the Maids" is the second episode of the first series of the British television series, Upstairs, Downstairs. The episode is set in 1904. It is one of five episodes shot in black-and-white due to an industrial dispute.

"The Mistress and the Maids" was among the episodes omitted from Upstairs, Downstairs' initial Masterpiece Theatre broadcast in 1974, and was consequently not shown on US television until 1989.

== Plot ==
In June 1904, Richard Bellamy commissions Guthrie Scone, (played by Anton Rodgers), a Bohemian artist, to paint his wife. Lady Marjorie Bellamy duly poses for Scone, and Sarah Moffat is sent to deliver Lady Marjorie's dresses to his studio. Soon Scone simultaneously paints a nude portrait of Sarah and (an imagined) Rose Buck, whom he paints from Sarah's descriptions. Both paintings are exhibited together as "The Mistress and the Maids" at the Royal Academy causing a scandal. Sarah and Rose are nearly sacked but Scone persuades Richard to retain them.
