= Guest of Honour (Upstairs, Downstairs) =

- Upstairs, Downstairs episode
- Episode no.: Season 2 Episode 5
- Directed by: Bill Bain
- Written by: Alfred Shaughnessy
- Original air date: 17 November 1972

Guest appearances
- Joan Benham (Lady Prudence Fairfax); Elvi Hale (Mrs. Millicent Hartfield); Ailsa Grahame (Lady Wanborough); Lockwood West (King Edward VII); Mary Kenton (Alice Keppel); Anthony Woodruff (Dr. Foley)

Episode chronology
← Previous "Whom God Hath Joined..."	Next → "The Property of a Lady"

"Guest of Honour" is the fifth episode of the second series of the British television series, Upstairs, Downstairs. The episode is set in 1909.

== Plot ==
Early in 1909, the Bellamys host a dinner, attended by King Edward VII. The servant Sarah, who is heavily pregnant by James Bellamy, has been sent to Lady Marjorie's family estate at Southwold to be out of the way, but finds it too boring and returns to Eaton Place, turning up on the evening the king is dining upstairs. Sarah goes into labour and gives birth to a boy the same evening, but the baby dies minutes after birth.

== Cast ==
=== Regular cast ===
- Rachel Gurney (Lady Marjorie Bellamy)
- Gordon Jackson (Mr. Angus Hudson)
- Angela Baddeley (Mrs. Kate Bridges)
- Jean Marsh (Rose Buck)
- David Langton (Richard Bellamy)
- Pauline Collins (Sarah)
- Christopher Beeny (Edward)
- Patsy Smart (Roberts)
- Jenny Tomasin (Ruby)

=== Guest cast ===
- Joan Benham (Lady Prudence Fairfax)
- Elvi Hale (Mrs. Millicent Hartfield)
- Ailsa Grahame (Lady Wanborough)
- Lockwood West (King Edward VII)
- Mary Kenton (Alice Keppel)
- Anthony Woodruff (Dr. Foley)
