= Evin Crowley =

Northern Irish actress

- Born: 5 December 1945 (age 80); Bangor, County Down, Northern Ireland
- Occupation: Actress

Evin Crowley (born 5 December 1945) is an actress from Northern Ireland. She started as a Lyric Player at the home of Mary O'Malley and her husband (later to become the Lyric Theatre, Belfast).

== Career ==
Crowley first appeared on stage from the mid-to-late 1960s.

In 1970, she made her television debut in The Sinners, playing the part of Sister Magdalene. In the same year, she played Moureen in David Lean's Ryan's Daughter. Her role was memorable as a mischief-making hussy. In the following year, Evin was Nominated for a BAFTA Film Award (Best Supporting Actress) for her role in Ryan's Daughter.

Notable television roles also include that of scullery maid Emily in Upstairs, Downstairs, where Crowley was critically praised for her performance in the episode I Dies from Love, wherein; she falls for a footman from another home, and is rejected.

Crowley also played Biddy Hall in the ABC historical drama Ben Hall (1975).

== Filmography ==
Film
Title	Role	Director	Year	Notes #
Ryan's Daughter	Moureen	David Lean	1970	prominent supporting role

Television
Title	Episode #	Role	Director	Year	Notes #
The Sinners	The Man Who Invented Sin	Sister Magdalen	Donald McWhinnie	1970	Season 1, Episode 2
ITV Saturday Night Theatre	The Dead	Miss Daly		1971	Season 3, Episode 7
Upstairs, Downstairs	On Trial	Emily	Raymond Menmuir	1971	Season 1, Episode 1
Upstairs, Downstairs	Board Wages	Emily	Derek Bennett	1971	Season 1, Episode 3
Upstairs, Downstairs	The Path of Duty	Emily	Joan Kemp-Welch	1971	Season 1, Episode 4
Upstairs, Downstairs	A Cry for Help	Emily	Derek Bennett	1971	Season 1, Episode 6
Upstairs, Downstairs	I Dies from Love	Emily	Raymond Menmuir	1972	Season 1, Episode 8
Thirty-Minute Theatre	The Judge's Wife	Peg	James Ferman	1972	Season 8, Episode 8
ITV Saturday Night Theatre	God Send Sunday	Meg		1972	Season 5, Episode 7
Within These Walls	When the Bough Breaks	Theresa O'Donovan	Christopher Hodson	1974	Season 1, Episode 11
South Riding	The Number of Our Days	Miss Vane	Alastair Reid	1974	Season 1, Episode 11
Churchill's People	King Alfred	Fat Legs	Herbert Wise	1975	Season 1, Episode 4
Ben Hall	13 episodes	Biddy Hall	Don Chaffey	1975	Season 1, Episodes 1-13
Softly, Softly: Task Force	At Risk	Joan Fisher	Frank Cox	1976	Season 8, Episode 10
