= John Quayle (actor) =

English actor

- Born: John D S Quayle; 21 December 1938 (age 87); Lincoln, England
- Relatives: Anna Quayle (sister)

John Quayle (born 21 December 1938) is an English actor who had roles in many sitcoms including All Gas and Gaiters, Terry and June, Steptoe and Son and The Liver Birds.

== TV career ==
The younger brother of actress Anna Quayle, his first main TV role was that of Jim Hawkins in the 1951 BBC serialisation of Treasure Island alongside Bernard Miles as Long John Silver. He also appeared in a 1952 episode of Billy Bunter of Greyfriars School. His roles in the 1960s included appearances in The Power Game and No Hiding Place. He also appeared in a 1964 episode of Coronation Street as an army bomb disposal officer.

He appeared in the sitcom All Gas and Gaiters in 1970. Later appearances included Steptoe and Son, The Liver Birds, Doomwatch, The Dick Emery Show, The Good Life, The Duchess of Duke Street, Happy Ever After, Rising Damp, Citizen Smith, Mind Your Language and The Fall and Rise of Reginald Perrin.

Quayle also made numerous appearances in London Weekend Television's popular period drama Upstairs, Downstairs. His first appearance was in the episode The Path of Duty (1971) as Lieutenant William "Billy" Watson, an army friend of James Bellamy and potential suitor of Bellamy's younger sister Elizabeth. Quayle was then cast in the recurring role of Bunny Newbury, again a close friend of James Bellamy.

The 1980s saw Quayle play the two roles that he is perhaps the most remembered for. Firstly, he played the Duke of Broughton in the BBC period drama Nanny. Secondly, in 1985 he became the third actor (after Terence Alexander and Tim Barrett) to play the Medfords' best friend Malcolm in the sitcom Terry and June. He also played a lead role in Yorkshire Television's sitcom Farrington of the F.O. alongside Joan Sims and Angela Thorne. Other appearances in the 1980s included roles in Johnny Speight's The Nineteenth Hole and Only When I Laugh. In 2006, he appeared in The Line of Beauty as Geoffrey Titchfield.

In more recent years Quayle played Mr Wilcox in Hippies, Anthony Stephens in Coronation Street, as well as roles in The Bill, Midsomer Murders, Monarch of the Glen, and Lab Rats.

== Theatre career ==
Appearances include Agatha Christie's Afternoon at the Seaside, and Light Up The Sky, together with For Services Rendered by Somerset Maugham at the National Theatre in 1979. He played the role of Bernard in Don't Dress for Dinner in the West End in 1991 and a New Zealand tour in 1993.

== Film career ==
In 1953, Quayle played the office boy in the film The Story of Gilbert and Sullivan. Other films include Night Train to Paris, Privates on Parade, Longitude, Seeing Red, A.K.A. and Fish Tales.

== Animal sanctuary ==
At the time of the filming of series 2 of Farrington, John Quayle and his wife Petronell were using their farmhouse home as an animal sanctuary. They began in 1976 when they adopted two donkeys from the Donkey Sanctuary near Sidmouth in Devon. In 1984 they adopted their third donkey, Jacob. Other animals included a pony, a horse, three pugs, a Russian Blue cat and a giraffe named Binkie.
