= A Change of Scene =

- Upstairs, Downstairs episode
- Episode no.: Season 3 Episode 3
- Directed by: Raymond Menmuir
- Written by: Alfred Shaughnessy
- Original air date: 10 November 1973

Guest appearances
- Richard Vernon (Major Cochrane-Danby); Helen Lindsay (Mrs. Cochrane-Danby); Celia Bannerman (Lady Diana Russell); Christopher Benjamin (Max Weinberg); Clive Morton (Makepiece); Jane Baxter (Lady Newbury); Anthony Ainley (Lord Charles Gilmour); John Quayle (Bunny Newbury); Patricia Lawrence (Mrs. Kenton); Anthony Dawes (Breeze); John Flint (Henry); Annette Woollett (Miss Celia Grey); Tricia Scott (Betsy); Elisabeth Day (Cecile)

Episode chronology
| ← Previous "Miss Forrest" | Next → "A Family Secret" |

A Change of Scene is the third episode of the third series of the British television series, Upstairs, Downstairs and is set in 1912.

== Plot ==
James Bellamy, accompanied by Angus Hudson to act as his valet, goes for a weekend visit to Somerby, the country house of James' school friend, Lord "Bunny" Newbury. Hudson is depicted as an exemplary butler at Somerby Park when he keeps things running smoothly after failings by the butler, Makepiece. Another guest, Max Weinberg, is a wealthy Jewish gentleman and businessman, and shows his appreciation for Hudson's capabilities and his manner. Hudson then gets a job offer, to replace the butler at Somerby. Hudson is tempted, but his loyalty towards the Bellamy family wins out.

== Cast ==
Regular cast

- Gordon Jackson (Mr. Angus Hudson)
- Angela Baddeley (Mrs. Kate Bridges)
- David Langton (Richard Bellamy)
- Simon Williams (James Bellamy)

Guest cast

- Richard Vernon (Major Cochrane-Danby)
- Helen Lindsay (Mrs. Cochrane-Danby)
- Celia Bannerman (Lady Diana Russell)
- Christopher Benjamin (Max Weinberg)
- Clive Morton (Makepiece)
- Jane Baxter (Lady Newbury)
- Anthony Ainley (Lord Charles Gilmour)
- John Quayle (Bunny Newbury)
- Patricia Lawrence (Mrs. Kenton)
- Anthony Dawes (Breeze)
- John Flint (Henry)
- Annette Woollett (Miss Celia Grey)
- Tricia Scott (Betsy)
- Elisabeth Day (Cecile)
