= Thomas Watkins =

Fictional character in ITV dramas

Thomas Watkins

Thomas David Watkins (c. 1876 – ?) is a fictional character in the ITV drama Upstairs, Downstairs and its spin-off Thomas & Sarah. He was portrayed by John Alderton.

== Greenwich ==
Thomas Watkins was born in about 1876, the fifth of seven children, and grew up in Abergavenny, Wales. In June 1909 he responded to an advert for the position of manservant to Lawrence Kirbridge. When newly married Elizabeth arrived with Rose at her new home in Greenwich, Thomas was waiting outside her new house. He soon struck up a friendship with Rose, and the two witnessed the collapsing marriage of Lawrence and Elizabeth. When the two separated six months later, Lawrence was given an allowance and sent to travel the world and he wanted to take Watkins with him. However, Thomas decided to stay and became chauffeur to the Bellamys at Eaton Place.

== Sarah ==
From the moment Thomas Watkins came to Eaton Place, he and Sarah quickly became close. They joined forces to defeat an Irishman who was trying to blackmail the Bellamys, and their closeness resulted in her becoming pregnant. Sarah told everyone that this was the result of an encounter with a gentleman while she sheltered from the rain. Thomas then offered marriage to solve the problem, and went to Richard Bellamy to ask permission to do so. He liked the idea, as it would solve many problems. However, his wife Lady Marjorie Bellamy became furious when she learned of this, as it was no longer acceptable to have Sarah living on the premises, as her son James Bellamy was returning from Army service in India; Sarah had become pregnant by James who was then exiled for a period. Their baby was stillborn. To buy the couple's silence, Richard gave Thomas £500 to start his own garage. Thomas always had ambitions above domestic service, and he and Sarah left service when they received the £500. They returned to visit the servants and to give Lady Marjorie a birthday present, on 6 May 1910. The subsequent celebration downstairs ended when the news of Edward VII's death broke.

== Life away from service ==
When they left service, Thomas and Sarah went their separate ways. Sarah gave birth at an aunt's house in the East End to a girl, who died at about an hour old. Soon after this, Thomas and Sarah got back together, although they never married. They began by trying at the garage business, but when this failed they tried many different schemes to make money, and even had servants of their own for a short time after Thomas won on a gamble. Thomas and Sarah were later forced back into service in the employ of Richard de Brassey, an eccentric man. Sarah and Richard had an affair, but when Thomas became trapped in a burning stable Richard attempted to save him and the stable collapsed. Richard died in the fire, while Thomas survived.
