= The Wages of Sin =

The Wages of Sin originates from the starting of the biblical verse Romans 6:23 "For the wages of sin is death, but the gift of God is eternal life in Christ Jesus our Lord."

It may also refer to:

== Film and television ==
- The Wages of Sin (1918 film), a British silent drama film
- The Wages of Sin (1929 film), a drama film
- The Wages of Sin (1938 film), a drama film
- The Wages of Sin (1956 film), a French drama film
- The Wages of Sin (Upstairs, Downstairs), an episode of the British television series Upstairs, Downstairs

== Literature ==
- The Wages of Sin, an 1891 novel by British author Lucas Malet
- The Wages of Sin (novel), a 1999 Doctor Who book by David A. McIntee
- Educated Youth (novel), a 1991 Chinese novel by Ye Xin, also translated as The Wages of Sin
- The Wages of Sin, a 2023 alternate history novel by Harry Turtledove

== Music ==
- Wages of Sin, a 2001 album by death metal group Arch Enemy
- The Wages of Sin, a song from the 1985 musical The Mystery of Edwin Drood
- The Wages of Sin, a 2019 digital release by English musician Pig

== Other ==
- Sin Mission Pack: Wages of Sin, a 1999 expansion for the first person video game SiN
