= A Special Mischief =

- Upstairs, Downstairs episode
- Episode no.: Season 2 Episode 10
- Directed by: Raymond Menmuir
- Written by: Anthony Skene
- Original air date: 29 December 1972

Episode chronology
← Previous "An Object of Value"	Next → "The Fruits of Love"

"A Special Mischief" is the tenth episode of the second series of the British television series, Upstairs, Downstairs. The episode is set in 1909.

== Plot ==
Elizabeth Bellamy becomes involved in the Suffragette movement and she joins a group of militant suffragettes . She is participating in an attack on a government minister's London home. Elizabeth is arrested, along with her innocent housemaid Rose. Julius Karekin, who exiting the MP's house, finds Elizabeth's card. Julius Karekin (born 1875) is a wealthy social climber and a very knowledgeable and talented stockbroker of Armenian descent. He saves Elizabeth from imprisonment by mentioning her family and connections to the police and at Court gets her off with a 40 shilling fine, which he then pays. Elizabeth thinks that Karekin is Jewish, but he is an Armenian. All the others, including Rose, are sent to prison. This makes Elizabeth feel incredibly guilty, and with the help of Karekin she gets Rose freed after the discovery they are being force fed. Julius Karekin becomes Elizabeth's new lover.

== Cast ==
- Donald Burton (Julius Karekin)
- Claire Nielson (Ellen Bouverie)
- Rosamund Greenwood (Lady Jessica Barnstaple)
- Veronica Doran (Bessie Purdoe)
- Deirdre Costello (Mabel Tomkins)
- Harold Innocent (Arthur Granville MP)
- Gerald Cross (Magistrate)
