= The Wages of Sin (Upstairs, Downstairs) =

- Upstairs, Downstairs episode
- Episode no.: Season 2 Episode 12
- Directed by: Christopher Hodson
- Written by: Anthony Skene
- Original air date: 12 January 1973

Episode chronology
← Previous "The Fruits of Love"	Next → "A Family Gathering"

"The Wages of Sin" is the twelfth episode of the second series of the British television series, Upstairs, Downstairs. The episode is set in 1910.

== Plot ==
Sarah and Thomas Watkins, who had previously been employed as the valet of Lawrence Kirbridge, fall in love, resulting in Sarah becoming pregnant again. They marry.

== Cast ==
Guest cast

- Nicola Pagett (Elizabeth Kirbridge)
- Donald Burton (Julius Karekin)
- Mairhi Russell (Mademoiselle Jeanette)
