= Miss Forrest =

- Upstairs, Downstairs episode
- Episode no.: Season 3 Episode 1
- Directed by: Raymond Menmuir
- Written by: Alfred Shaughnessy
- Original air date: 27 October 1973

Episode chronology
← Previous "A Family Gathering"	Next → "A House Divided"

"Miss Forrest" is the first episode of the third series of the British television series, Upstairs, Downstairs. The episode is set in 1912, and is the last appearance of Rachel Gurney as Lady Marjorie Bellamy. It also introduces Hazel Forrest (Meg Wynn Owen), who becomes the new mistress of 165 Eaton Place later in the series.

== Plot ==
In April 1912 Lady Marjorie Bellamy and her lady's maid, Miss Roberts are preparing to visit Elizabeth Bellamy in New York.

Richard hires Hazel Forrest to type the biography of his father-in-law, the late Earl of Southwold, which he is writing. Hazel is a lower middle class young woman who has been earning a living as a secretary for ten years, against her parents' wishes. She immediately catches the eye of James Bellamy, much to Lady Marjorie and Hudson's concern. The matter is resolved shortly before Lady Marjorie departs, after which it is revealed she is aboard the RMS Titanic.
