= The Key of the Door =

- Upstairs, Downstairs episode
- Episode no.: Season 1 Episode 12
- Directed by: Brian Parker
- Written by: Raymond Bowers
- Original air date: 27 February 1972

Episode chronology
← Previous "The Swedish Tiger"	Next → "For Love of Love"

"The Key of the Door" is the twelfth episode of the first series of the British television series, Upstairs, Downstairs. The episode is set in the winter of 1908.

"The Key of the Door" was among the episodes omitted from Upstairs, Downstairs' initial Masterpiece Theatre broadcast in 1974, and was consequently not shown on US television until 1988.

== Plot ==
In Winter 1908 Elizabeth Bellamy is influenced by Evelyn Larkin and makes a party for Larkin's bohemian companions, in which she falls in love with the poet Lawrence Kirbridge.
