= The Bolter =

- Upstairs, Downstairs episode
- Episode no.: Season 3 Episode 8
- Directed by: Cyril Coke
- Written by: John Hawkesworth
- Original air date: 15 December 1973

Episode chronology
← Previous "Word of Honour"	Next → "Goodwill to All Men"

"The Bolter" is the eighth episode of the third series of the British television series, Upstairs, Downstairs. The episode is set in 1913.

== Plot ==
James and Hazel Bellamy are going for a weekend hunting party to Somerby Park in 1913, the country house of James' school-friend Lord "Bunny" Newbury. The other guests encourage her to surprise James and join the hunt, something she has never done before. Diana Newberry, a childhood friend and love interest of James Bellamy, is jealous and contemptuous of James' middle-class wife Hazel. Diana secretly switches the horses on James' wife Hazel and gives her one that is too spirited. It bolts and runs away so that she almost has a fatal accident. She and James then argue, as he feels humiliated. This, in addition to Major Cochrane-Danby claiming that James and Diana are sleeping together, leads Hazel to flee Somerby with Rose. James follows her back to London when he discovers she has left, and they soon make up.

== Cast ==
Guest cast

- Major Cochrane-Danby (Richard Vernon)
- Mrs. Cochrane-Danby (Helen Lindsay)
- Bunny Newbury (John Quayle)
- Diana Newbury (Celia Bannerman)
- Colonel Harry Tewkesbury (Bernard Archard)
- Mrs. Tewkesbury (Kate Coleridge)
- Lord Charles Gilmour (Anthony Ainley)
- Breeze (Anthony Dawes)
- Joseph (Tony Bateman)
- Cecile (Elisabeth Day)
- Henry (John Flint)
