= An Object of Value =

- Upstairs, Downstairs episode
- Episode no.: Season 2 Episode 9
- Directed by: Raymond Menmuir
- Written by: Anthony Skene
- Original air date: 15 December 1972

Episode chronology
← Previous "Out of the Everywhere"	Next → "A Special Mischief"

"An Object of Value" is the ninth episode of the second series of the British television series, Upstairs, Downstairs. The episode is set in 1909.

== Plot ==
Thomas Watkins continues his liaison with Sarah and they fall in love. Rose and Thomas are showing their jealousy over Sarah's affections and they duel over Sarah's affections. They both love Sarah. Thomas Watkins wants to get into the motorcar business. He is the inciter who seeks to influence the mind of Sarah to steal a bottle of wine. Thomas becomes a suspect in the brooch theft. Rose thinks that he also influenced the mind of Sarah to steal the brooch. Thomas Watkins and Mr. Donaldson fight a duel over Sarah's honor and over Sarah's love. In the fight scene between Watkins and Donaldson the furniture and fittings have been completely destroyed by Thomas Watkins.

== Cast ==
Regular cast

- Gordon Jackson (Angus Hudson)
- Jean Marsh (Rose Buck)
- Joan Benham (Lady Prudence Fairfax)
- David Langton (Richard Bellamy)
- Simon Williams (James Bellamy)
- Angela Baddeley (Mrs. Bridges)
- Jenny Tomasin (Ruby)

Guest cast

- Mr. Donaldson (Christopher Biggins)
- Mr. Curtis (John Kidd)
- Lady Southwold (Cathleen Nesbitt)
