= Ain't Misbehavin' (TV series) =

- Genre: Sitcom
- Created by: Roy Clarke
- Starring: Peter Davison; Nicola Pagett; John Duttine; Polly Hemingway
- Country of origin: United Kingdom
- Original language: English
- No. of series: 2
- No. of episodes: 12

Production
- Production locations: Harrogate, North Yorkshire, England, UK
- Running time: 30 minutes

Original release
- Network: BBC1
- Release: 20 March 1994 – 14 February 1995

Ain't Misbehavin' is a British sitcom that aired on BBC1 from 20 March 1994 to 14 February 1995. It stars Peter Davison and Nicola Pagett and was written by Roy Clarke, the writer of Last of the Summer Wine and Keeping Up Appearances.

== Cast ==
- Peter Davison as Clive Quigley
- Nicola Pagett as Sonia Drysdale
- Lesley Manville as Melissa Quigley (series 1)
- Karen Drury as Melissa Quigley (series 2)
- John Duttine as Dave Drysdale
- Polly Hemingway as Ramona Whales
- Barry Stanton as Lester Whales (series 2)
- Ian McNeice as Chuck Purvis (series 1)
- Paul Brooke as Chuck Purvis (series 2)

== Plot ==
Clive Quigley starts the series thinking he is happily married to his wife Melissa, but Sonia Drysdale comes along and informs him that her husband Dave is having an affair with Melissa. Clive believes her only after spying on Melissa and Dave together, and even contemplates suicide. He and Sonia then join forces to split up the affair, but they do not know that Melissa and Dave haven't actually committed adultery yet. Sonia and Clive hire a private detective called Chuck Purvis. The other characters were Lester and Ramona Whales. Ramona was Clive's secretary, whom her jealous husband Lester always thought was having an affair with Clive.

== Air dates ==
=== Series One (1994) ===
1. Episode One (20 March 1994)
2. Episode Two (27 March 1994)
3. Episode Three (3 April 1994)
4. Episode Four (10 April 1994)
5. Episode Five (17 April 1994)
6. Episode Six (24 April 1994)

=== Series Two (1995) ===
1. Episode One (10 January 1995)
2. Episode Two (17 January 1995)
3. Episode Three (24 January 1995)
4. Episode Four (31 January 1995)
5. Episode Five (7 February 1995)
6. Episode Six (14 February 1995)
