= For Love of Love =

- Upstairs, Downstairs episode
- Episode no.: Season 1 Episode 13
- Directed by: Herbert Wise
- Written by: Rosemary Anne Sisson
- Original air date: 5 March 1972

Episode chronology
← Previous "The Key of the Door"	Next → "The New Man"

"For Love of Love" is the thirteenth and final episode of the first series of the British television series, Upstairs, Downstairs. The episode is set in 1909.

In the episode, Elizabeth falls in love with a poet and dreams of living with him out of wedlock, while he falls in love with her family's money and social status. Meanwhile, James has an unlikely affair with Sarah, a music hall singer.

== Plot ==
It is June, 1909, and Elizabeth has not been in contact with the family since walking out at the end of the previous episode. Only Rose knows that she is staying with her friend Henrietta in rented lodgings. A frequent visitor is Lawrence Kirbridge, a poet, and Elizabeth and Lawrence fall in love. Eventually, Richard and Lady Marjorie learn where their daughter is, and Richard goes to visit her. Richard has read some of Kirbridge's poems in the paper, and becomes impressed with him, and the Bellamys invite Elizabeth and Lawrence to tea. Even though Elizabeth is against the very idea of marriage, her parents manage to talk her into marrying Lawrence. Meanwhile, James has been visiting Sarah, who had previously been dismissed as underhouse parlourmaid. Sarah is now a music hall singer. Sarah shows up at Elizabeth's wedding, apparently uninvited.
