= All the King's Horses (Upstairs, Downstairs) =

- Upstairs, Downstairs episode
- Episode no.: Season 5 Episode 15
- Directed by: Simon Langton
- Written by: Jeremy Paul
- Production code: 12
- Original air date: 14 December 1975

Episode chronology
← Previous "Noblesse Oblige"	Next → "Whither Shall I Wander?"

"All the King's Horses" is the fifteenth episode of the fifth and final series of the period drama Upstairs, Downstairs. It first aired on 14 December 1975 on ITV.

== Background ==
All the King's Horses was recorded in the studio on 12 and 13 June 1975. The director of the episode, Simon Langton, was the son of David Langton, who played Richard Bellamy. All the King's Horses is the final appearance of Simon Williams as James Bellamy.

== Plot ==
James Bellamy returns from America with renewed enthusiasm for life and hope for his future. He has taken to speculating on the New York Stock Exchange and has made a lot of money. After bestowing lavish gifts on Virginia, Richard and Georgina, James proposes to pay for Georgina's wedding and even suggests moving to a bigger house as a direct result of his increasing wealth. Rose invests her entire inheritance from the estate of her deceased fiancé Gregory after taking advice from James, but sadly this is just before the Wall Street crash of 1929. James and Rose lose everything.

The disclosure of the losses – particularly Rose's – leads to an argument in which James is berated by his father for his failures in life. Richard tells James he is glad his mother did not live to see how James is today. Retreating to his room, James later upsets Georgina by burning the letters she wrote to him in happier times. He then leaves Eaton Place, ostensibly to stay with a friend. James actually goes to a hotel in Maidenhead, where he commits suicide with his service revolver. The police arrive at Eaton Place late at night with the news.

== Cast ==
- Simon Williams – James Bellamy
- Gordon Jackson – Hudson
- Hannah Gordon – Virginia Bellamy
- David Langton – Richard Bellamy
- Lesley-Anne Down – Georgina Worsley
- Angela Baddeley – Mrs Bridges
- Jean Marsh – Rose
- Christopher Beeny – Edward
- Pippa Page – Mary
- Jacqueline Tong – Daisy
- Lindsay Campbell – Inspector Rodwell
