= Noblesse Oblige (Upstairs, Downstairs) =

- Upstairs, Downstairs episode
- Episode no.: Season 5 Episode 14
- Directed by: Cyril Coke
- Written by: John Hawkesworth
- Production code: 15
- Original air date: 7 December 1975

Episode chronology
← Previous "Joke Over"	Next → "All the King's Horses"

"Noblesse Oblige" is the fourteenth episode of the fifth and final series of the period drama Upstairs, Downstairs. It first aired on 7 December 1975 on ITV.

== Background ==
Noblesse Oblige was recorded in the studio on 24 and 25 July 1975.

== Plot ==
It is June 1929. Georgina and Lord Stockbridge are seeing a lot of each other; Robert tells Georgina he is in love with her, and she admits she feels the same. When Stockbridge proposes, Georgina accepts. Richard is delighted for them. However, Robert's mother, the Duchess of Buckminster, says she and the Duke disapprove - mainly because of the inquest Georgina was involved in (dealt with in the previous episode "Joke Over"), and the press coverage Georgina received over the years as one of the London bright young things. However, a few days later Georgina is invited to tea with the Duchess, who tells Georgina that she and the Duke are sending Robert around the world for some months. They feel their son is not yet ready to marry or to run their large estates. Georgina and Robert agree to marry in exactly one year's time, 12 June 1930.

Meanwhile, after getting fed up with Mrs Bridges' constant hectoring, Ruby leaves Eaton Place during the night. She writes to Richard Bellamy to ask for a reference, and gets a job in the London suburb of Ruislip as a cook-general on £46 a year. In Lady Bellamy's absence, Georgina interviews Mabel Wilks as a replacement, and she is employed despite asking for higher wages. However, Mabel is insubordinate, does not do her work properly and is rude to everyone. Mrs Bridges is unable to cope.

Ruby's new mistress, Mrs Gladys Waddilove, is a bully who treats her badly. Mrs Bridges reads a letter from Ruby to Daisy and visits Ruby, sensing she is unhappy. After hearing how exhausted Ruby is and witnessing Mrs Waddilove's abusive treatment, Mrs Bridges brings Ruby back to Eaton Place. Mabel leaves.

As a result of the 1929 general election, Richard loses his government post.

== Cast ==
- Angela Baddeley - Mrs Bridges
- Lesley-Anne Down - Georgina Worsley
- David Langton - Richard Bellamy
- Ursula Howells - Duchess of Buckminster
- Christopher Beeny - Edward
- Jacqueline Tong - Daisy
- Jenny Tomasin - Ruby
- Anthony Andrews - Robert, Marquess of Stockbridge
- Elaine Donnelly - Mabel
- Joan Sanderson - Mrs Waddilove
- Deddie Davies - Mrs Tibbitt
- Frank Duncan - Wireless Announcer
