= Whither Shall I Wander? =

- Upstairs, Downstairs episode
- Episode no.: Season 5 Episode 16
- Directed by: Bill Bain
- Written by: John Hawkesworth
- Original air date: 21 December 1975

Episode chronology
← Previous "All the King's Horses"	Next → "The Fledgling"

Whither Shall I Wander? is the final episode of the fifth series of the period drama Upstairs, Downstairs, and the concluding episode of the original 1970s run of the programme. It first aired on 21 December 1975 on ITV. For many years it represented the conclusion of the story of 165 Eaton Place, until 2010 when the BBC revived the programme with a new series.

== Plot ==
In the summer of 1930, family solicitor Sir Geoffrey Dillon calls at Eaton Place to advise everyone about the estate left by the late James Bellamy. Georgina is the main legatee but will inherit nothing; No. 165 Eaton Place has to be sold to help meet the debts charged against James' estate, and the family and staff will need to find new homes.

Robert returns to England and still wants to marry Georgina. However, Georgina, without any money and refusing to accept charity, decides her wedding must be put off due to the financial obligations it entails. Virginia and Sir Geoffrey conspire to secretly transfer £2000 from Virginia's investments to Georgina as a fictitious remainder from James' estate and the wedding is set for 12 June, the reception at a hotel having a massive cake baked by Mrs. Bridges. The staff attend the reception, and the episode shows people going their respective ways after being allowed to take keepsakes from their time at Number 165.

Richard, Virginia, and her children move away to a small house in Dorset, retaining Rose as a lady’s maid, while Daisy and Edward will work Lord and Lady Stockbridge at their new home on the Buckminster estate. Mr. Hudson and Mrs. Bridges announce they have married in a brief civil ceremony ("...in the eyes of the Lord, better late than never.") Ruby aspires to become a cinema usherette, but Mr. and Mrs. Hudson, feeling Ruby would be unable to fend for herself, decide to take her with them to run their seaside boarding house in Hastings.

The series concludes with Rose walking alone through the empty 165 Eaton Place, recalling memories associated with each room, and finally leaving the property, which bears a sign showing it is for sale.

== Cast ==
- Lesley-Anne Down - Georgina Worsley
- Raymond Huntley - Geoffrey Dillon
- Hannah Gordon - Virginia Bellamy
- David Langton - Richard Bellamy
- Gordon Jackson - Angus Hudson
- Jean Marsh - Rose Buck
- Angela Baddeley - Kate Bridges
- Joan Benham - Lady Prudence Fairfax
- Ursula Howells - Duchess of Buckminster
- Christopher Beeny - Edward Barnes
- Jacqueline Tong - Daisy Peel Barnes
- Jenny Tomasin - Ruby Finch
- Anthony Andrews - Marquis of Stockbridge
- Anne Yarker - Alice Hamilton
