= Thomas & Sarah =

1979 British TV drama series

- Genre: Drama
- Created by: Alfred Shaughnessy
- Based on: Characters by Jean Marsh; Eileen Atkins; John Hawkesworth; John Whitney
- Starring: Pauline Collins; John Alderton
- Country of origin: United Kingdom
- Original language: English
- No. of seasons: 1
- No. of episodes: 13

Production
- Executive producer: Tony Wharmby
- Producer: Christopher Hodson
- Running time: 50 minutes
- Production company: LWT

Original release
- Network: ITV
- Release: 14 January – 8 April 1979

Thomas & Sarah is a British drama series that aired on ITV in 1979. A spin-off from the BAFTA Award-winning series Upstairs, Downstairs, it stars John Alderton and Pauline Collins reprising their Upstairs, Downstairs roles.

== Background ==
Following the end of Upstairs, Downstairs in 1975 there were many ideas for spin-offs, and the idea for Thomas & Sarah was originally given the name In Confidence by Alfred Shaughnessy and John Hawkesworth. At a memorial service for Cyril Bennett, the LWT Controller who had died in November 1976, his successor Michael Grade agreed to do a programme with John Alderton and Pauline Collins, now a celebrated television couple, reprising their former roles. In October 1977, John Hawkesworth was commissioned to write a synopsis for the programme, and it was filmed from September 1978 to March 1979. The writers, many of whom had worked on Upstairs, Downstairs, were Terence Brady and Charlotte Bingham, Alfred Shaughnessy, Jeremy Paul, Anthony Skene, Alick Rowe and Angharad Lloyd.

== Plot ==
Thomas & Sarah follows the adventures of Thomas Watkins, the chauffeur, and Sarah, the house and nursery maid, after leaving service at Eaton Place in 1910. Sarah is pregnant, and according to their last episode of Upstairs, Downstairs they have married, but according to Thomas & Sarah they "never got round to it". In addition, a two-part short story, entitled The Spin of the Wheel, that bridges the gap between them leaving Eaton Place and the start of Thomas & Sarah, was written by Alfred Shaughnessy and published in the TV Times in the 23 December and 6 January issues.

== Episodes ==
No.	Title	Original release date
1	"Birds of a Feather"	14 January 1979
Thomas and Sarah have split, and Sarah is working in a village in Surrey, thinking Thomas is a part of her past. However, he soon appears in the village.
2	"The Silver Ghost"	21 January 1979
After a Rolls-Royce is delivered to Thomas's garage for servicing, Thomas unwittingly becomes involved in a smuggling operation involving stolen property.
3	"The Biters Bit"	28 January 1979
Having been mistaken for members of the aristocracy, Thomas and Sarah gatecrash a weekend house party. However, the hostess soon realises they're not who they say they are.
4	"The Vanishing Lady"	4 February 1979
Sarah is back working in the music halls, and after seeing a vanishing act, wonders if she and Thomas could turn this into their own act.
5	"Made in Heaven"	11 February 1979
Thomas decides to start a matchmaking business for lonely couples, and an empty house he is caretaking will be the ideal base for the business.
6	"Alma Mater"	18 February 1979
Thomas and Sarah get jobs in a rundown boarding school, and soon discover that the headmaster is swindling the parents of the pupils.
7	"A Day at the Metropole"	25 February 1979
The couple travel to Brighton so Thomas can use his skills to help a wealthy gentleman win a motor race.
8	"The Poor Young Widow of Peckham"	4 March 1979
After a photograph of Sarah taken on the streets of London brings Thomas both to the point of death and nationwide fame.
9	"There Is a Happy Land"	11 March 1979
After Sarah tricks Thomas into turning his back on his dream of emigrating to the United States, he seeks his revenge.
10	"Return to Gethyn"	18 March 1979
Thomas and Sarah's visit to his family in rural Wales gives Sarah the opportunity to establish whether Thomas really did rape Bessie Evans.
11	"Putting on the Ritz"	25 March 1979
The pair plan a con trick at the Ritz Hotel, but they wonder whether the waiter is all he seems.
12	"The New Rich"	1 April 1979
After a lucky gamble, Thomas and Sarah move up in the world and get servants of their own. However, their butler (Nigel Hawthorne) is not impressed by their behaviour.
13	"Love Into Three Won't Go"	8 April 1979
Thomas and Sarah have to return to domestic service, in the employ of the reclusive Richard de Brassey. Between him and Sarah a strange love blossoms.

=== Cliffhanger ===
The last minutes of the first series saw Sarah mourning at a graveside. The public were not to know whether this was Thomas or Richard de Brassey, her last employer, but the public knew that a second series had been commissioned, so it was clear that it couldn't have been Thomas in the grave.

== Second series ==
The public reaction to the series was good enough to have a second series commissioned, and some location work was filmed in July 1979. However, a strike at ITV which took the channel off the air for 75 days from 10 August to 24 October 1979 meant that work on the second series of Thomas & Sarah was postponed, and ultimately cancelled. The location work has since been wiped. The names of four of the episodes are known, "Where There's A Will"', "For Richer, For Poorer", "Favours" and "Flying the Foam". Again, these were written by Terence Brady & Charlotte Bingham and Jeremy Paul.

== Novelisations ==
Like Upstairs, Downstairs, novelisations of the series were written. The first book, titled simply Thomas & Sarah, was published in 1978 by Sphere Books and covers the first seven episodes of the programme. The second book, titled Thomas & Sarah: Two for a Spin, was also published by Sphere Books and released in 1979. Both books were written by Mollie Hardwick, who also wrote many Upstairs, Downstairs books.

== Home releases ==
Thomas & Sarah was released in Region 2 (UK) by VCI in 2004. This followed releases of all episodes of Upstairs, Downstairs by VCI in similar packaging. VCI stopped making copies of the DVDs in 2005. The whole series was released by Network DVD on 16 April 2007, Network having previously released all episodes of Upstairs, Downstairs.

A&E Home Video released the entire series on DVD in Region 1 on 27 April 2004.

In 2012 Acorn Media re-released the series (as they had Upstairs, Downstairs in 2006 with DVD commentaries) in a 4-disc DVD set indicating the best possible digital resolution was attained in conjunction with the age of the series and the technology (1978–79) used to make it. There is no DVD commentary from either Alderton or Collins or surviving cast or crew.

== Bibliography ==
- Richard Marson, "Inside UpDown - The Story of Upstairs, Downstairs", Kaleidoscope Publishing, 2005
