= On Trial (Upstairs, Downstairs) =

- Upstairs, Downstairs episode
- Episode no.: Season 1 Episode 1
- Directed by: Raymond Menmuir / Derek Bennett
- Written by: Fay Weldon / Alfred Shaughnessy
- Original air date: 10 October 1971

Episode chronology
← Previous —	Next → "The Mistress and the Maids"

"On Trial" is the first episode of the first series of the British television series, Upstairs, Downstairs. The episode is set in November 1903.

Due to an industrial dispute over extra payments for using newly introduced colour equipment, during which broadcasting unions refused to allow their members to use colour cameras, the first six episodes of the first series were shot in black-and-white, and when colour production resumed, the first episode was remade in colour.

There are 2 endings shot for the colour version of this episode, one where Sarah quits was to air when the black and white season 1 episodes are not part of the broadcast package, as was the case for the original USA broadcasts, and one where she stays (she eventually leaves in the later episode 3, which was black and white).

The original black-and-white version of this episode is believed to have been wiped.

== Plot ==
Sarah Moffat is engaged at 165 Eaton Place, on trial. Rose Buck and Sarah become good friends. Sarah tells the staff she is French but is caught out in making out she is above her station.
