= Pauline Collins =

British actress (1940–2025)

Pauline Collins OBE
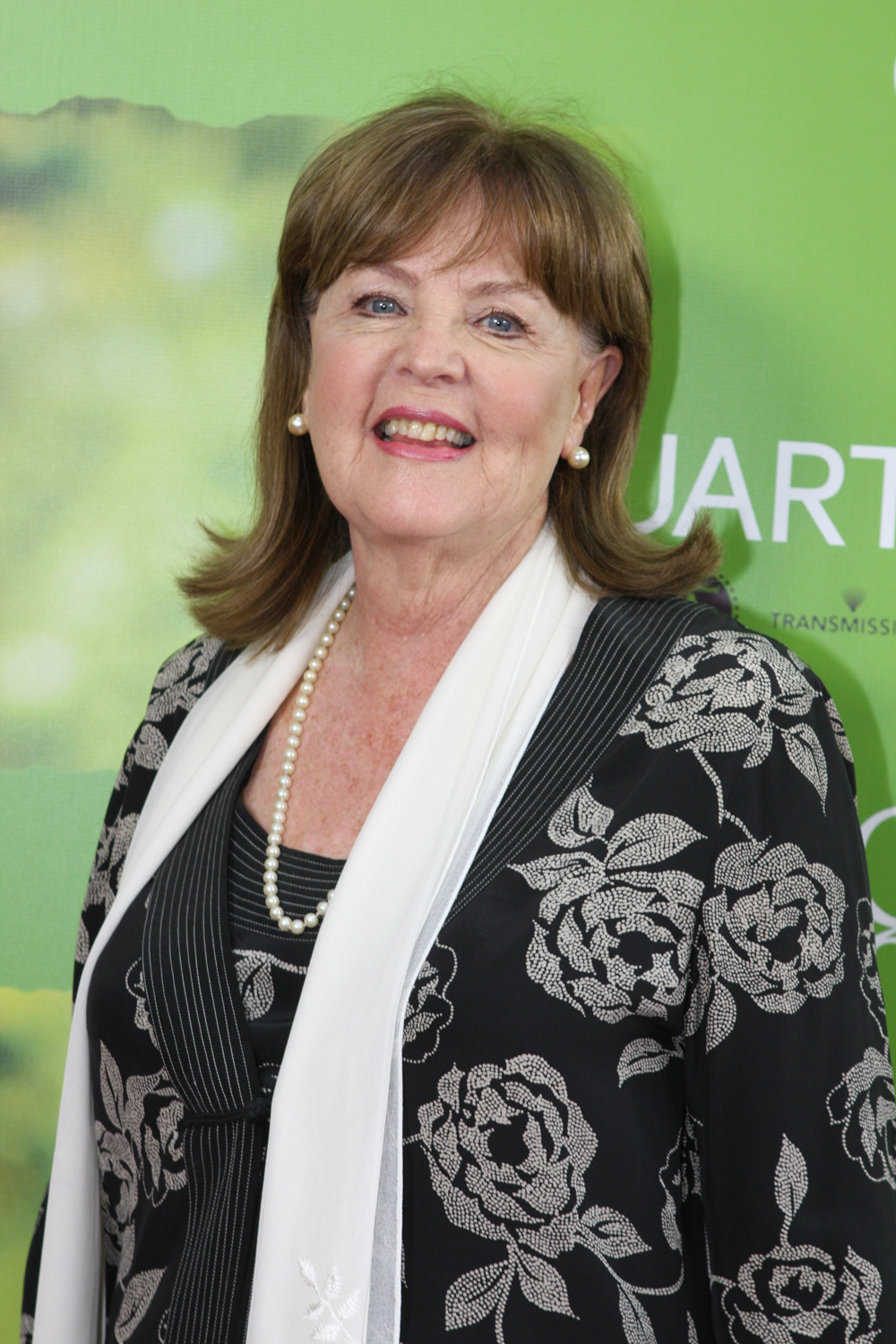
- Collins in 2012
- Born: Pauline Angela Collins; 3 September 1940; Exmouth, Devon, England
- Died: 5 November 2025 (aged 85); Highgate, London, England
- Education: Central School of Speech and Drama
- Occupation: Actress
- Years active: 1962–2017
- Spouse: John Alderton (m. 1969)
- Children: 4

Pauline Angela Collins (3 September 1940 – 5 November 2025) was a British actress who first rose to fame portraying Sarah Moffat in Upstairs, Downstairs (1971–1973) and its spin-off Thomas & Sarah (1979). In 1992, she published her autobiography, Letter to Louise.

Collins played the title role in the play Shirley Valentine for which she won the Laurence Olivier Award for Best Actress, and the Tony Award for Best Actress in a Play. She reprised the role in the 1989 film adaptation of the play, winning a BAFTA Award for Best Actress in a Leading Role, an Evening Standard British Film Award, and nominations for both an Academy Award for Best Actress and a Golden Globe Award for the Best Performance by an Actress – Motion Picture. Collins also starred in the television dramas Forever Green (1989–1992) and The Ambassador (1998–1999). Her other film appearances include City of Joy (1992) and Paradise Road (1997).

== Early life and career ==
Pauline Angela Collins was born on 3 September 1940 in Exmouth, Devon, the daughter of Mary Honora (née Callanan), a schoolteacher, and William Henry Collins, a school headmaster. She was of Irish descent on both her mother's and father's side, and was brought up as a Catholic in Wallasey, Cheshire. Her great-uncle was the Irish poet Jeremiah Joseph Callanan.

Collins was educated at Sacred Heart High School in London and later studied at the Central School of Speech and Drama also in London. Before turning to acting, she worked as a teacher until 1962. She made her stage debut in A Gazelle in Park Lane in 1962 in Windsor, Berkshire, and her West End debut in Passion Flower Hotel in 1965. During the play's run, she made her first film, Secrets of a Windmill Girl, released in 1966. More stage roles followed.

Collins played Samantha Briggs in the 1967 Doctor Who serial The Faceless Ones and was offered the chance to continue in the series as a new companion for the Doctor, but declined the role.

Collins's other early television credits include the UK's first medical soap, Emergency Ward 10 (1960), and the pilot episode and first series of The Liver Birds, both in 1969.

Collins first became well known for her role as the maid Sarah Moffat in the 1970s drama series Upstairs, Downstairs. The character appeared regularly throughout the first two series, the second of which starred her actor husband John Alderton, with whom she later starred in the spin-off Thomas & Sarah (1979), the sitcom No, Honestly and a series of short-story adaptations titled Wodehouse Playhouse (1975–1976). She co-narrated the animated British children's television series Little Miss with Alderton in 1983.

In connection with her role on Upstairs, Downstairs, Collins recorded the 1973 single "What Are We Going to Do with Uncle Arthur?" (performed by her character several times during the series) backed with "With Every Passing Day" (a vocal version of the show's theme).

She was a subject of the television programme This Is Your Life in April 1972 when she was surprised by Eamonn Andrews.

== Shirley Valentine and later years ==
In 1988, Collins starred in the one-woman play Shirley Valentine in London, reprising the role on Broadway in 1989 and in the 1989 film version. The film won a number of awards and nominations; Collins was nominated for both an Oscar as Best Actress, as well as for a Golden Globe Award for Best Actress in a Comedy or Musical. Both the play and the feature film used the technique known as breaking the fourth wall as the character Shirley Valentine directly addresses the audience throughout the story.

After Shirley Valentine, Collins starred with her husband in the popular ITV drama series Forever Green.

Collins was voted sexiest woman in Britain in 1990.

Collins's film credits included 1992's City of Joy, 1995's My Mother's Courage, 1997's Paradise Road, and 2002's Mrs Caldicot's Cabbage War, which also featured Alderton. In 1999 and 2000, Collins starred as Harriet Smith in the BBC television drama Ambassador. Her other later television career credits include The Saint, The Wednesday Play, Armchair Theatre, Play for Today, Tales of the Unexpected, Country Matters, and The Black Tower.

In 2002, she appeared in Man and Boy, a television adaptation based on Tony Parsons' bestselling novel. In 2005, she appeared as Miss Flite in the BBC production of Charles Dickens's Bleak House.

In 2006, she became the third actor to have been in both the original and new series of Doctor Who, appearing in the episode "Tooth and Claw" as Queen Victoria.

Later in 2006, she appeared in Extinct, a programme where eight celebrities campaigned on behalf of an animal to save it from extinction.

In December 2007, she appeared as the fairy godmother in the pantomime Cinderella at the Old Vic in London.

In 2011, she was cast as part of the comedy-drama Mount Pleasant.

In late 2015, she appeared as Mrs Gamp in the BBC TV series Dickensian.

Collins was appointed an Officer of the Order of the British Empire in the 2001 Birthday Honours for services to drama.

== Personal life and death ==
Collins married actor John Alderton in 1969; they and their three children lived in Hampstead, London. With actor Tony Rohr, Collins had a daughter, Louise, whom she placed for adoption in 1964. She and Louise were reunited 21 years later. Collins's book, Letter to Louise, documents these events.

Later in life, Collins had Parkinson's disease. She died at a care home in Highgate, London, on 5 November 2025 aged 85.

== Filmography ==
=== Film ===
Year	Title	Role	Notes
1966	Secrets of a Windmill Girl	Pat Lord	
1989	Shirley Valentine	Shirley Valentine-Bradshaw	
1992	City of Joy	Joan Bethel	
1995	My Mother's Courage	Elsa Tabori	
1997	Paradise Road	Daisy 'Margaret' Drummond	
2000	One Life Stand	Karaoke Crowd	
2002	Mrs Caldicot's Cabbage War	Thelma Caldicot	
2009	From Time to Time	Mrs Tweedie	
2010	You Will Meet a Tall Dark Stranger	Cristal	
2011	Albert Nobbs	Margaret 'Madge' Baker	
2012	Quartet	Cissy Robson	
2015	Dough	Joanna	
2017	The Time of Their Lives	Priscilla	
2017	Byrd and the Bees	Beatrice	

=== Television ===
Year	Title	Role	Notes
1957	Emergency – Ward 10	Nurse Elliott	1 episode
1966	The Marriage Lines	Jean	Episode: "Big Business"
1966	Pardon the Expression	Miss Wainwright / Val	3 episodes
1966	The Saint	Marie-Therese	Episode: "The Better Mousetrap"
1966	Blackmail	Freida Straker	Episode: "Please Do Not Disturb"
1967	The Avengers	Miss Peadbody (voice, uncredited)	Episode: "Dead Man's Treasure"
1967	Doctor Who	Samantha Briggs	Serial: "The Faceless Ones"
1968	Armchair Theatre	Betty / Mary Murtagh	2 episodes
1969	The Old Campaigner	Winnie Haldane	Episode: "French Farce"
1969	Comedy Playhouse	Dawn / Marjorie	2 episodes
1969	The Liver Birds	Dawn	5 episodes
1969	Parkin's Patch	Doreen Ashworth	Episode: "A Pair of Good Shoes"
1972	Country Matters	Ruby	Episode: "Crippled Bloom"
1971–1973	Upstairs, Downstairs	Sarah Moffat	13 episodes
1974	No, Honestly	Clara Burrell-Danby	13 episodes
1975	BBC Play of the Month	Lady Teazle	Episode: "The School for Scandal"
1975–1976	Wodehouse Playhouse	various characters	13 episodes
1979	Thomas & Sarah	Sarah Moffat	13 episodes
1979	Play for Today	Eileen	Episode: "Long Distance Information"
1980	Tales of the Unexpected	Pat Lewis	Episode: "A Girl Can't Always Have Everything"
1984	Knockback	Sylvia	TV movie
1985	The Black Tower	Maggie Hewson	5 episodes
1988	Tales of the Unexpected	Eve Peregrine	Episode: "The Colonel's Lady"
1989–1992	Forever Green	Harriet Boult	18 episodes
1996	Flowers of the Forest	Aileen Matthews	TV movie
1998–1999	The Ambassador	Harriet Smith	13 Episodes
2000	Little Grey Rabbit		TV series
2002	Man and Boy	Betty Silver	TV movie
2003	Sparkling Cyanide	Catherine Kendall	TV movie
2005	Bleak House	Miss Flite	10 episodes
2006	Doctor Who	Queen Victoria	Episode: "Tooth and Claw"
2006	What We Did on Our Holiday	Lil Taylor	TV movie
2010	Agatha Christie's Marple	Thyrza Grey	Episode: "The Pale Horse"
2010	Merlin	Alice	Episode: "Love in the Time of Dragons"
2011–2012	Mount Pleasant	Sue	14 episodes
2015–2016	Dickensian	Mrs Gamp	20 episodes

== Theatre ==
Year	Title	Role	Notes
1962	A Gazelle in Park Lane	Sabiha, an Arab maid-servant	Theatre Royal, Windsor
1965-1966	Passion Flower Hotel	Lady Janet Wigton	Prince of Wales Theatre
1968	The Importance of Being Earnest	Cecily Cardew	Theatre Royal, Haymarket
1969	The Night I Chased the Women with an Eel	Brenda Cooper	Comedy Theatre, London, Chester Gateway Theatre, and other locations
1970	The Happy Apple	Nancy Gray	Apollo Theatre, Theatre Royal, Brighton, and other locations
1970	Come As You Are		New Theatre, London and Strand Theatre, London
1974	Judies	Judy	Comedy Theatre
1975	Engaged	Minnie Symperson	The Old Vic, London
1975–1976	Confusions		Theatre Royal, Bath
1976–1977	Confusions	Lucy / Paula / Polly / Milly / Beryl	Apollo Theatre
1980–1981	Rattle of a Simple Man	Cyrenne	Savoy Theatre, Theatre Royal, Windsor, and other locations
1983	Romantic Comedy	Phoebe Craddock	Apollo Theatre
1986–1987	Woman in Mind	Susan (replacement)	Vaudeville Theatre and Richmond Theatre
1988-89	Shirley Valentine	Shirley Valentine	Vaudeville Theatre; Booth Theatre
1992	Shades	Pearl	Albery Theatre, Richmond Theatre, London, and other locations
2007–2008	Cinderella	Fairy Godmother	The Old Vic, London

== Awards and nominations ==
Year	Awards	Category	Nominated works	Results	Ref.
1973	British Academy Television Awards	Best Actress	Upstairs, Downstairs / Country Matters / Crippled Bloom	Nominated	
1976	Laurence Olivier Awards	Actress of the Year in a New Play	Engaged	Nominated	
1987	CableACE Awards	Best Actress in a Theatrical or Dramatic Special	Knockback	Nominated	
1988	Laurence Olivier Awards	Actress of the Year in a New Play	Shirley Valentine	Won	
1989	Drama Desk Award	Outstanding Actress in a Play	Shirley Valentine	Won	
1989	Drama League Award	Distinguished Performance Award	Shirley Valentine	Won	
1989	Outer Critics Circle Awards	Outstanding Actress in a Play	Shirley Valentine	Won	
1989	Theatre World Award	Best Actress	Shirley Valentine	Won	
1989	Golden Apple Award	Female Discovery Of The Year	Shirley Valentine	Won	
1989	Tony Awards	Best Actress in a Play	Shirley Valentine	Won	
1990	Academy Awards	Best Actress	Shirley Valentine	Nominated	
1990	British Academy Film Awards	Best Actress in a Leading Role	Shirley Valentine	Won	
1990	Evening Standard British Film Awards	Best Actress	Shirley Valentine	Won	
1990	Golden Globe Awards	Best Actress in a Motion Picture – Musical or Comedy	Shirley Valentine	Nominated	
