= Lady Marjorie Bellamy =

Fictional character from Upstairs, Downstairs

Lady Marjorie with Captain Hammond, 1906

The Lady Marjorie Helen Sybil Bellamy (née Talbot-Carey; 6 May 1860 or 12 July 1864 – 15 April 1912) is a fictional character in the ITV drama Upstairs, Downstairs. The character was a regular member of the show in series one and two, and a guest in series three. She was portrayed by Rachel Gurney, who initially declined the role.

== Backstory ==
In the narrative of Upstairs, Downstairs, Lady Marjorie was born on 6 May 1860 (according to the episode "A Family Gathering"). "A Family Gathering" is the second series finale and the 26th episode overall of the 1970s UK period drama Upstairs, Downstairs. It was written by Alfred Shaughnessy, and directed by Raymond Menmuir.

She was married to Richard Bellamy (David Langton) in 1880 and had two children, James (Simon Williams) and Elizabeth (Nicola Pagett). Their home was at 165 Eaton Place.

At the end of the second series, the character departed the show by boarding RMS Titanic, after which she was presumed dead.

"Miss Forrest" is the first episode of the third series of the British television series Upstairs, Downstairs. The episode is set in 1912, and is the last appearance of Rachel Gurney as Lady Marjorie Bellamy. It also introduces Hazel Forrest (Meg Wynn Owen), who becomes the new mistress of 165 Eaton Place later in the series.
