= Nicola Pagett =

English actress (1945–2021)

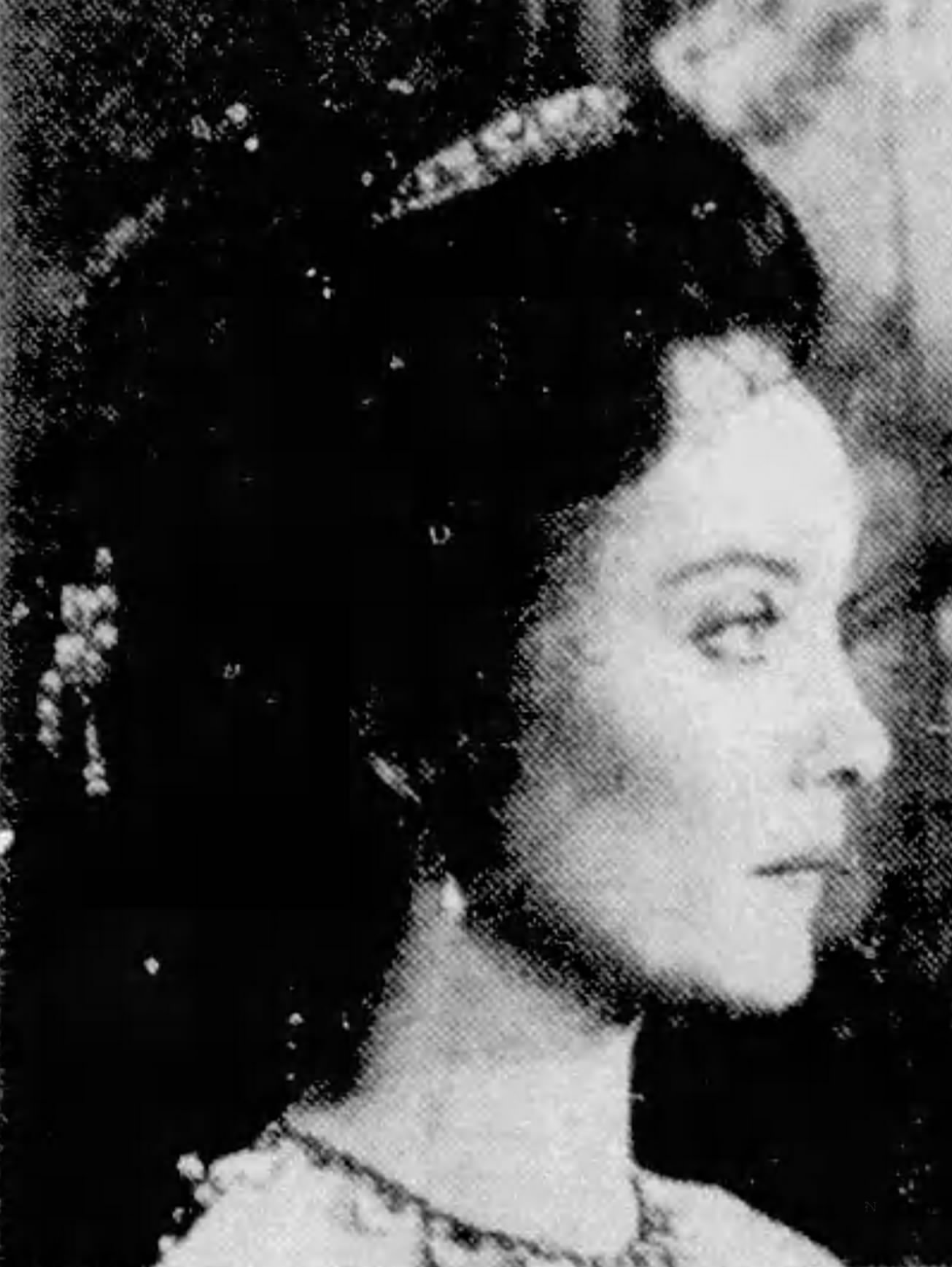
- Pagett in 1977
- Born: Nicola Mary Pagett; 15 June 1945; Cairo, Kingdom of Egypt
- Died: 3 March 2021 (aged 75); London, England
- Occupation: Actress
- Years active: 1964–2000
- Spouse: Graham Swannell (m. 1975; div. 1997)
- Children: 1

Nicola Mary Pagett (15 June 1945 – 3 March 2021), known professionally as Nicola Pagett, was a British actress, known for her role as Elizabeth Bellamy in the 1970s TV drama series Upstairs, Downstairs (1971–1973), as well as being one of the leads in the sitcom Ain't Misbehavin' (1994–1995). Her film appearances included Anne of the Thousand Days (1969), Frankenstein: The True Story (1973), Operation Daybreak (1975), Privates on Parade (1983) and An Awfully Big Adventure (1995).

== Early life ==
Born in Cairo, Egypt, Nicola Pagett spent most of her childhood out of Britain—in Hong Kong, Cyprus and Japan, the family moving with her father who worked for a major oil company. She was educated at Saint Maur International School, in Yokohama, Japan. In 1962, Pagett entered Britain's Royal Academy of Dramatic Art where she studied for two years.

== Career ==
In 1964, Pagett appeared in several productions with Worthing Repertory Company and the Glasgow Citizen's Theatre. Then her performance in the television play The Girl in the Picture caught the attention of Sir Robert Helpmann who cast her to tour with Vivien Leigh in the stage play La Contessa.

In 1965, she appeared in the Incorporated Television Company (ITC) production of Gideon's Way, episode 10, "How to Retire without Really Working" in an uncredited role as girl at railway station. Also in 1965, under the name Nicola Paget, she appeared in Gideon's Way series 1 episode 15 called "The Alibi Man".

She also appeared in the British TV series Danger Man in an episode called "The Mirror's New". She appeared in The Persuaders! in the episode "The Long Goodbye", and two episodes of Special Branch.

Between 1971 to 1973 she appeared as Elizabeth Bellamy in the British series Upstairs, Downstairs.

This was followed in 1975 by an appearance in the British television police drama, The Sweeney. Pagett appeared in the episode Stoppo Driver in which she played the character of Sara Prince, part of a family of criminals involved in the kidnap of the wife of Detective Constable Brian Cooney, a Flying Squad driver.

In May 1976, she appeared as Bella Manningham in Gas Light at the Criterion Theatre, London, with Peter Vaughan and Anton Rodgers.

She played the title role in the 1977 BBC adaptation of Anna Karenina and gave a memorable performance in David Nobbs's TV series A Bit of a Do. She appeared in films such as The Viking Queen (1967), Come Back Peter (1969), Anne of the Thousand Days (1969), There's a Girl in My Soup (1970), Frankenstein: The True Story (1973), Operation Daybreak (1975), Oliver's Story (1978), Privates on Parade (1983), Scoop (1987) and An Awfully Big Adventure (1995). She appeared in leading roles (as the young Irish bride Conor) in the 1980 Australian mini-series The Timeless Land and Sonia Drysdale in the 1994 to 1995 sitcom Ain't Misbehavin'.

== Selected filmography ==
Year	Title	Role	Notes
1964–1966	Armchair Theatre	Kitty Black/ Barbera	2 episodes
1965	Danger Man	Nicola	Episode: "The Mirror's New"
1965	Gideon's Way	Girl at Railway Station/ Cathy Bellman	2 episodes
1965	Hereward the Wake	Princess Anja	2 episodes
1966–1969	The Wednesday Play	Mary/ Adele Dobbs	2 episodes
1967	Mr. Rose	Susan	Episode: "The One Woman"
1967	Sexton Blake	Patricia	Episode: "The Vanishing Snowman"
1967	The Viking Queen	Talia	Film
1968	The Avengers	Lady Adriana Beardsley	Episode: "Have Guns, Will Haggle"
1968	The Caesars	Messalina	Episode: "Claudius"
1968	Man in a Suitcase	Carla Faversham	Episode: "Burden of Proof"
1968	Softly, Softly	Margery Anderson	Episode: "The Good Girl"
1968	The Troubleshooters	Christina Van Der Hoep	Episode: "A Girl to Warm Your Feet On"
1969	Anne of the Thousand Days	Princess Mary	Film
1969	Come Back Peter	Jenny (uncredited)	Film
1969–1970	Special Branch	Margot/ Lydia Tamarova	2 episodes
1970	There's a Girl in My Soup	Clare	Film
1970	Wicked Women	Florence Maybrick	Episode: "Florence Maybrick"
1971	Barlow at Large	Despina Economides	Episode: "Heat of the Sun"
1971	The Persuaders!	Carla Wilks	Episode: "The Long Goodbye"
1971–1973	Upstairs, Downstairs	Elizabeth Bellamy	13 episodes
1973	Frankenstein: The True Story	Elizabeth Fanshawe	Film
1973	The Rivals of Sherlock Holmes	Countess Nadja	Episode: "Anonymous Letters"
1974	Napoleon and Love	Mlle. George	Episode: "Georgina"
1975	Operation Daybreak	Anna	Film
1975	The Sweeney	Sara Prince	Episode: "Stoppo Driver"
1977	Anna Karenina	Anna Karenina	10 episodes
1978	Oliver's Story	Joanna Stone	Film
1980	The Timeless Land	Conor Mannion	6 episodes
1983	Privates on Parade	Acting Lieutenant Sylvia Morgan	Film
1985	A Woman of Substance	Adele Fairley	3 episodes
1987	Scoop	Julia Stitch	Film
1987	Screen Two	Elizabeth	Episode: "Visitors"
1988	Beryl Markham: A Shadow on the Sun	Emma Orchardson	TV movie
1989–1990	A Bit of a Do	Liz	13 episodes
1992	Party Time	Charlotte	TV movie
1994–1995	Ain't Misbehavin'	Sonia Drysdale	12 episodes
1995	An Awfully Big Adventure	Dotty Blundell	Film
1998	Dangerfield	Anna Harris	Episode: "Angel"
2000	Up Rising	Sally Kegworthy	5 episodes

== Personal life ==
Pagett married actor/writer Graham Swannell in 1975. They had one daughter. The couple divorced in 1997.

Pagett was diagnosed with bipolar disorder in 1997, after having become obsessed with the then prime minister's chief press secretary Alastair Campbell. She related in her book Diamonds Behind My Eyes that she later recovered.

Pagett died on 3 March 2021, aged 75, after suffering from a brain tumour.
