= Elizabeth Bellamy =

- Elizabeth with her husband Lawrence Kirbridge on her Wedding Day
- First appearance: "The Path of Duty" (1971)
- Last appearance: "A Family Gathering" (1973)
- Portrayed by: Nicola Pagett

In-universe information
- Nickname: Miss Lizzie
- Family: Richard Bellamy (father); Lady Marjorie Bellamy (mother); Virginia Bellamy (stepmother); James Bellamy (brother); Alice Hamilton (stepsister); William Hamilton (stepbrother)
- Spouses: Lawrence Kirbridge; Dana Wallace
- Children: Lucy Elizabeth Kirbridge
- Relatives: Charles Bellamy (grandfather); Hannah Bellamy (grandmother); Walter Talbot-Carey, 12th Earl of Southwold (grandfather); Mabel Talbot-Carey, Countess of Southwold (grandmother); Arthur Bellamy (uncle); Hugo Talbot-Carey, 13th Earl of Southwold (uncle); Lady Katherine Castleton (great-aunt); Georgina Worsley (step-cousin)

Elizabeth Bellamy (also Kirbridge) is a fictional character in the ITV period drama Upstairs, Downstairs, originally broadcast for five series from 1971 to 1975. She was portrayed by Nicola Pagett.

Elizabeth is the daughter of Richard and Lady Marjorie, and was a main character for the first two series, appearing in 13 episodes. She grew up at 165, Eaton Place (exterior shots were the actual 65 Eaton Place, with a "1" painted in front of "65") in fashionable Belgravia. The spoiled, self-absorbed younger sister of James, Elizabeth takes a somewhat fleeting, but serious, interest in various social causes, including socialism and the Suffragette movement. The impulsive Elizabeth marries a poet, Lawrence Kirbridge, but he turns out to have no interest in sex and arranges for his publisher to have sex with Elizabeth, and a child is conceived. Soon after, Lawrence is sent abroad with an allowance, and Elizabeth has a relationship with an Anglo-Armenian. Elizabeth is close to the maid Rose, who frequently calls her "Miss Lizzie", even after marriage.

Elizabeth leaves Upstairs, Downstairs between the second and third series when she moves to New York. The reason for the departure was Nicola Pagett's refusal to appear again, after she was not selected to appear in an Upstairs, Downstairs film. The film was never made.

== Early life ==
Elizabeth is born in 1886 to Richard Bellamy, a Conservative MP, and Lady Marjorie Bellamy, the daughter of the 12th Earl of Southwold, a prominent Conservative politician. She finishes her education at Frau Beck's Finishing School, in Dresden, Germany, in 1905 and has her coming out ball in May of that year at Londonderry House. She was due to be presented to King Edward VII by her aunt Kate (Lady Castleton), but runs away from the ball. Unlike her elder brother James, she is close to her father, while having a somewhat strained relationship with her mother (with whom she shares a tendency to haughty behaviour, though Elizabeth lacks her mother's kindness or maternal feeling).

In December 1905, she falls in love with Baron Klaus von Rimmer, a German who turns out to be a homosexual. Her maid Rose discovers that he is having an affair with the footman Alfred. Alfred warns Klaus that the police are coming to arrest him and they flee 165 Eaton Place. Not wishing Elizabeth to know about the baron's sexual preference, she is told that he is an agent for the German armaments firm Krupp seeking to bribe members of Parliament (which is also true, and the reason for the arrival of the police).

Elizabeth is a member of the Young Women's Christian Fellowship, and while working with them in a soup kitchen, she sees the former housemaid Sarah, and saves her from poverty by arranging for her re-employment, as the scullery maid at 165 Eaton Place.

== Marriage to Lawrence Kirbridge ==
In the winter of 1908, she becomes involved with a group of socialist poets, and upsets her parents by inviting them to tea whilst they are away. She also, under the influence of one member, Evelyn Larkin, accrues a bill of over £4 on shoes and socks for street children, then refuses to pay for them and is arrested. Her father intervenes, and pays for the shoes. After an argument with her parents, she runs away from home to stay with her friend Henrietta Winchmore, and is only discovered after Rose is forced to tell Hudson where Elizabeth is staying. Her father visits, and shortly afterwards, Elizabeth and poet Lawrence Kirbridge have tea at Eaton Place.

While Elizabeth is reluctant to marry rather than having a relationship outside marriage, Rose persuades her that it is the right thing to do. She and Lawrence Kirbridge, who is the Cambridge-educated maternal grandson of a Dorset baronet, marry in June 1909. They take their honeymoon in Vienna, and set up home in Greenwich.

== Sir Edwin Partridge and birth of daughter ==
The marriage is unhappy from the start, and Lawrence does not wish to consummate the relationship. He later angrily asks his valet Thomas whether he thinks that Lawrence is homosexual. Lawrence 'arranges' for his publisher, the much older Sir Edwin Partridge, to have sex with Elizabeth at a soiree the couple host. During Christmas 1908, Elizabeth informs her parents that her marriage has failed. The family solicitor, Sir Geoffrey Dillon, prepares for an annulment of the marriage on the grounds that it has not been consummated. However, after an examination by a doctor, it is discovered that Elizabeth is three to four months pregnant and she is forced by her father to divulge the identity of the father. Lawrence is sent abroad with an allowance, and the Greenwich house is sold.

Later, Elizabeth gives birth to a daughter, Lucy Elizabeth, in a London nursing home. To avoid scandal, and since Lawrence is the legal father, he is asked to attend the baby's christening. Following the ceremony, he is never heard from again. Elizabeth, lacking maternal feelings, is indifferent to the baby and content to have Lucy be brought up in the nursery by Sarah and the servants.

== Suffragettes and affair with Julius Karekin ==
Elizabeth becomes involved in the Suffragette movement, participating in an attack on an MP's house. She is arrested, along with the innocent Rose. A businessman and investor of Armenian descent, Julius Karekin, who exiting the MP's house, finds Elizabeth's card, and at the court hearing gets her off with a 40 shilling fine, which he then pays. All the others, including Rose, are sent to prison. This makes Elizabeth feel guilty, and with the help of Karekin she gets Rose freed after the discovery that the women are being force fed.

Elizabeth soon starts an affair with Karekin, and he gives her a hat shop, which she names Madame Yvonne. He also buys 165, Eaton Place when the £5600 lease is up for sale following the death of Lady Marjorie's father, and gives the house to Richard and Lady Marjorie. Her relationship with Julius Karekin fizzles out after a few months when he starts a relationship with someone else. He had always made it clear that he was a philanderer. Elizabeth is last seen celebrating Lady Marjorie's birthday, about two years before Lady Marjorie dies in the sinking of the Titanic in 1912.

== Move to New York City, 1911–1929 ==
Although Elizabeth is last seen on the series in 1910, it is mentioned that she has moved to New York, and has married an attorney named Dana J. Wallace. No other information is given as to why she moved, and how she met Wallace.

In 1914, when talking to Georgina, Rose refers to Elizabeth and "her husband and children", meaning that she and Wallace have at least one child, since Elizabeth had only one child prior to her second marriage. Lady Marjorie is on her way to see Elizabeth in New York when the Titanic sinks and Lady Marjorie drowns. Elizabeth becomes entitled to the style 'The Honourable' when her father is raised to the peerage in 1917.

In 1924, Georgina stays with Elizabeth in New York, and while James is in America in 1928-1929, he visits Elizabeth. While James is in New York, he and Wallace invest in the stock market and James becomes wealthy. The 29 October 1929 stock market crash occurs and Wallace loses money, but manages to pull some funds out in time. James, back in London, does not hear about the stock market crash for many hours, and by then, it is too late - he has lost all of his money.

== Bibliography ==
- John Hawkesworth, In My Lady's Chamber, Sphere Books Limited, 1973

== See also ==
- The Fruits of Love
- A Special Mischief
- Married Love (Upstairs, Downstairs)
