= Sarah Moffat =

Fictional character in the ITV drama Upstairs, Downstairs

- Upstairs, Downstairs character
- Sarah (right) with Rose Buck (Jean Marsh)
- First appearance: "On Trial"; 10 October 1971
- Last appearance: "Love Into Three Won't Go"; 8 April 1979
- Created by: Jean Marsh; Eileen Atkins; John Hawkesworth; John Whitney
- Portrayed by: Pauline Collins

In-universe information
- Aliases: Clémence Moffat; Clémence Dumas; Sarah Delice; Sarah Watkins
- Gender: Female
- Occupation: Actress; Domestic servant
- Family: Albert Moffat (father); Marianne Dumas (mother); Charlie Moffat (brother); Sophia Moffat (sister)
- Children: Stillborn son Infant daughter
- Relatives: Alexandre Dumas (alleged ancestor)

Sarah Moffat is a fictional character in the ITV drama Upstairs, Downstairs and its spin-off Thomas & Sarah. She was portrayed by Pauline Collins.

== Character biography ==
Sarah was the daughter of Albert Moffat and Marianne Dumas, who said she was the granddaughter of Alexandre Dumas, however she was baptized as Clémence Moffat. Her parents met at the Theatre Royal in 1879 and Clémence was conceived about three months before her parents' marriage and born in July 1882. She had two younger siblings: a brother, Charlie, born in 1887 and a sister named Sophia. Charlie, whom she had to spend much time in her childhood looking after due to his ill health, died in the final days of 1899. At the age of 6, she first went on the stage with the help of Agnes Hewitt, the manager of the Olympic Theatre in Drury Lane, and earned three shillings a week. Her father, who was let go from many jobs due to drunkenness, died after being run over by an omnibus when Clémence was 15. Her mother committed suicide days later and they were buried in a double funeral.

Clémence soon got work at a tailor's shop, but when a male member of staff tried to assault her, she was rescued by a pastor, and then went to work at his Hope Mission for a year. She left there in 1900, after the pastor, Martin Blackwood, offered her marriage and wanted her to beat him. After wandering the streets of London trying to find somewhere to stay, she caught pneumonia and was taken in by a spiritualist medium called Lydia Pagenell, who lived in Bloomsbury. Clémence worked as Miss Pagenell's assistant for three and a half years until someone reported them for fraud, and they were both sent to Holloway Prison in October 1903. Miss Pagenell died weeks later in prison, while Clémence was released on 1 November. She went to Pratt's, an agency for domestic servants, who sent her to Eaton Place.

== Storylines ==
=== Early days ===
When she arrived at 165 Eaton Place, Sarah rang the front doorbell instead of going to the servants' entrance as was proper. Moments later in the morning room, she was interviewed by Lady Marjorie, who declared Clémence was "not a servant's name" and renamed her "Sarah". Sarah had problems fitting into service as an under-house parlour maid, and within her first week she stole from the kitchen. When Hudson and Mrs. Bridges made her write out a passage from the Bible, she was forced to reveal she was illiterate. She quickly struck up a friendship with the head house parlour maid, Rose. The footman Alfred Harris made unwanted romantic advances, but Sarah was frightened by his manner and distanced herself from him.

In June 1904, Richard Bellamy commissioned a painter, Guthrie Scone, to paint his wife. Sarah was sent to deliver Lady Marjorie's dresses to Scone's studio, and soon Scone was painting Sarah as well, lying in bed. He also painted Rose from Sarah's description of her and both maids appeared half-naked. When the paintings were exhibited together as "The Mistress and the Maids", Sarah and Rose were nearly sacked, but Scone persuaded Richard to keep them on. Two months later in August, while the family and senior servants were away, the junior servants dressed up as the family. This ended in disaster when James came back and found them in the morning room. After this, Sarah, annoyed by James's high-handed attitude, left Eaton Place.

=== Discovery in Whitechapel ===
In 1908, Sarah was discovered starving and destitute in a soup kitchen in Whitechapel by Elizabeth and James. Elizabeth insisted on taking Sarah back to Eaton Place and installed her in the only vacant position as a scullery maid. Sarah was unhappy; determined to become under-house parlourmaid again, upset Alice (the under-house parlour maid) so she left, and Sarah took her place. However, her second stint at Eaton Place didn't last long. In October 1908, she was set up by Thorkil Kraft, the batman of a Swedish Captain staying at Eaton Place, was framed for theft, and left.

Sarah then began a stage career as music hall entertainer Clémence Dumas (or Sarah Delice) and was known for saucy songs such as "What Are We Going to Do with Uncle Arthur?". At about the same time, she began an affair with James Bellamy which included their spending a weekend in Paris. To everyone's surprise, she appeared at Elizabeth's wedding (apparently at James's invitation) and at the reception Hudson, quite reluctantly, had to address her as "Miss".

=== Pregnancy ===
Sarah and James's affair came to a head when Sarah became pregnant, telling James she was expecting a "little Captain". This, along with James's considerable debts, meant he had to tell his parents. The family solicitor, Sir Geoffrey Dillon, arranged for Sarah to stay in a cottage on the Southwold Estate. The child was to be educated, and Sarah found local work. James was sent to India.

However, she found Southwold too boring, and ran away to Eaton Place, turning up the evening the King was dining upstairs in early 1909. She gave birth the same evening, but the baby boy died minutes after birth. Sarah was then given light work around the house, and after Elizabeth gave birth, she became baby Lucy's nursery maid.

=== Thomas Watkins ===
From the moment Thomas Watkins came to Eaton Place in December 1909, he and Sarah quickly became close. The Welsh Thomas had been employed as manservant to Lawrence Kirbridge, and always had ambitions above domestic service. When the Kirbridges separated, Lawrence offered to take him around the world as his manservant, but Thomas instead decided to come to Eaton Place as a chauffeur. He and Sarah joined forces to defeat an Irishman who was trying to blackmail the Bellamys, and this closeness resulted in Sarah's second pregnancy. Sarah asserted to the fellow servants that a gentleman had assaulted her while seeking shelter from the rain. In response, Thomas proposed marriage as a solution and sought permission from Richard Bellamy. Richard, seeing the advantages of this arrangement, approved and provided Thomas with £500 to establish his own garage. Consequently, Thomas and Sarah departed from their service. They later returned to visit the servants and present Lady Marjorie with a birthday gift on May 6, 1910. The ensuing celebration downstairs came to an abrupt halt with the news of the death of Edward VII.

== Life away from service ==
When they left service, Thomas and Sarah went their separate ways. Sarah gave birth at an aunt's house in the East End to a girl, who died at about an hour old. Soon after this, Thomas and Sarah got back together, although they never married. Initially, they attempted the garage business, but it failed. They then explored various money-making schemes, briefly enjoying the luxury of having their own servants after Thomas won a gamble. Subsequently, Thomas and Sarah were compelled to return to service under Richard de Brassey, an eccentric individual. An affair ensued between Sarah and Richard. However, tragedy struck when Thomas got trapped in a burning stable. In an attempt to rescue him, Richard's efforts led to the collapse of the stable, resulting in his death, while Thomas managed to survive.
