= James Bellamy (Upstairs, Downstairs) =

Fictional character (1881–1929)

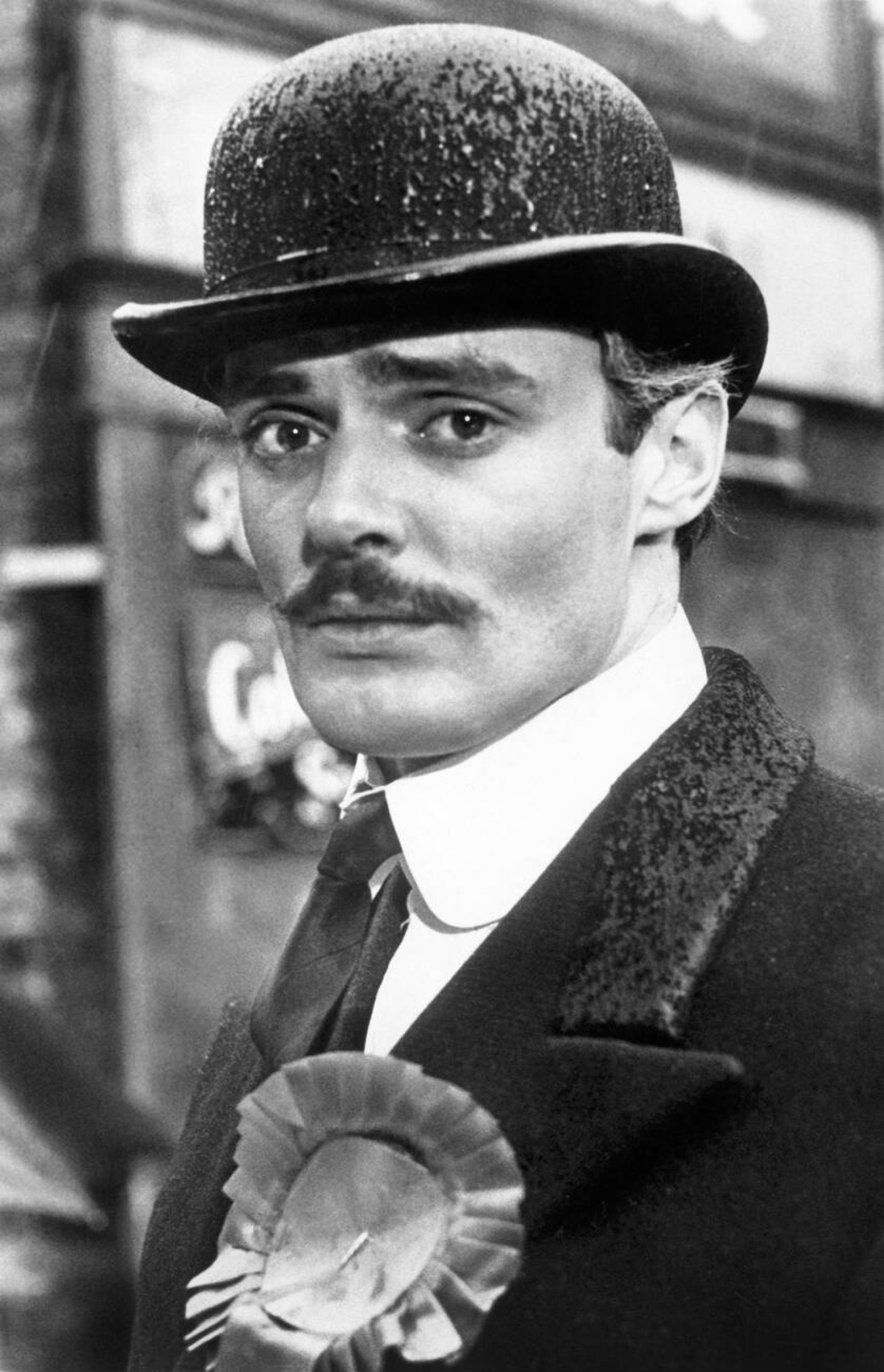
- First appearance: "Board Wages"
- Last appearance: "All the King's Horses"
- Portrayed by: Simon Williams

In-universe information
- Family: Richard Bellamy (father); Lady Marjorie Bellamy (mother); Virginia Bellamy (stepmother); Elizabeth Bellamy (sister); Alice Hamilton (stepsister); William Hamilton (stepbrother)
- Spouse: Hazel Forrest (1912–1918; her death)
- Children: Stillborn son
- Relatives: Lucy Elizabeth Kirbridge (niece); Charles Bellamy (grandfather); Hannah Bellamy (grandmother); Walter Talbot-Carey, 12th Earl of Southwold (grandfather); Mabel Talbot-Carey, Countess of Southwold (grandmother); Arthur Bellamy (uncle); Hugo Talbot-Carey, 13th Earl of Southwold (uncle); Lady Katherine Castleton (great-aunt); Georgina Worsley (step-cousin)

Major The Honourable James Rupert Bellamy (1881 – October 1929) is a fictional character in the ITV period drama Upstairs, Downstairs, that was originally broadcast for five series from 1971 to 1975. He was portrayed by Simon Williams.

James Bellamy is one of the main characters in Upstairs, Downstairs, appearing in 37 episodes, from the third episode of the first series "Board Wages" to the penultimate episode of the fifth and final series "All the King's Horses". Handsome, arrogant, irresponsible, and selfish, James is his mother's favourite child. James never truly recovers from her death on the Titanic in 1912. After a few unsuccessful relationships, James marries Hazel Forrest, but their happiness is short-lived due to their disparate backgrounds; she dies in the Spanish flu pandemic of 1918. James serves in the Great War but is seriously wounded at Passchendaele on the Western Front in 1917 and subsequently never finds a purpose in life or true love. He commits suicide in 1929 after losing his fortune in the Wall Street crash.

== Early life ==
While his birth date is never directly referenced, James Rupert Bellamy is likely born in the summer of 1881 (Lady Prudence, an old family friend, reminds his father that he was 30 years of age when he proposed to Hazel in November 1912, in the episode "A Family Secret". However, Hawkesworth explicitly states in the first novelisation of the show's scripts that James is 23 years old in 1904 making 1881 more than likely his birth year), the first child of Richard, a Conservative MP and Lady Marjorie Bellamy, the daughter of the 12th Earl of Southwold. He has a sister, Elizabeth who was born in 1886 (or 1887). James is portrayed as going to Eton and then attends the Royal Military Academy Sandhurst, and by 1904 he has been commissioned as a lieutenant in the Life Guards in the British Army. James is his mother's favourite, but he has a difficult relationship with his father, who finds his son weak and irresponsible.

== Beau of Lady Cynthia ==
James was paired with Cynthia Cartwright (portrayed by Jessica Benton) in the episode "The Path of Duty". His sister Elizabeth and Cynthia Cartwright have their coming-out ball in May 1905 at Londonderry House. Elizabeth was due to be presented to the King and Queen by her Aunt Kate (Lady Castleton), but she ran away from the ball. Cynthia, James, Richard and Marjorie don't know what to do at the ball without Elizabeth.

== Affair with Sarah ==
In about 1908, James, now a Captain, starts an affair with the former house maid Sarah, who is now a music hall singer and who attends Elizabeth's wedding. Soon, Sarah becomes pregnant by James, who is in debt of around £1350. Sarah gives him some of her earnings. James's regiment in Windsor contacts his parents about his debts, and he confesses everything to them. The family solicitor, Sir Geoffrey Dillon, arranges for Sarah to be sent to Lady Marjorie's family home, Southwold, and for James to be transferred to India with the Sind Horse Regiment, although Lady Marjorie is furious that James has been sent abroad. While he is gone, in the early months of 1909, Sarah returns to Eaton Place, fed up with life at Southwold. The same night she returns, Sarah gives birth to a boy, who dies almost immediately.

== Fiancé of Phyllis Kingman ==
When James returns from India in May 1910, he brings home with him a well-meaning, middle-class, Army Veterinarian Major's daughter named Phyllis Kingman, to whom he has become engaged. The engagement does not last, however, as he later admits he does not love her, nor believes she would fit in.

== Marriage to Hazel ==
In early March 1912, Richard hires a secretary, Hazel Forrest, and James quickly takes an interest in her. While his parents are away one weekend in April (right before Lady Marjorie's ill-fated trip aboard the Titanic), James insists that Hazel lunch with him in the Dining Room, much to butler Hudson's disapproval. After about seven months of courting, James proposes in November, but Hazel tearfully refuses him. It causes Hazel's father, Arthur Forrest, to visit James. He explains that Hazel was previously married to a drunk, Patrick O'Connor, who beat her. They divorced, and Hazel moved back in with her parents. Mr. Forrest wants his daughter to be happy, while the prickly Mrs. Forrest is sure the Bellamys would never accept Hazel as a divorced woman. James asks Hazel again, and after talking and James letting Hazel know his own sister Elizabeth is a divorced and remarried woman, she accepts his second proposal. They marry in late 1912 or early 1913, and honeymoon in Paris.

The middle-class Hazel has difficulty adapting to James' upper-class world. On a hunting weekend to Somerby, Lord Newbury's country house, the other guests encourage her to surprise James and join the hunt, something she has never done before. However, Diana Newbury, a childhood friend of James, had secretly swapped the horses and gives Hazel a spirited horse that bolts and runs away with Hazel, who escapes largely uninjured. She and James then argue as he feels humiliated. This, in addition to Major Cochrane-Danby claiming that James and Diana are sleeping together, leads Hazel to flee Somerby with Rose. James follows her back to London and they soon make up. In mid-1914, Hazel suffers a miscarriage. By now, James has left the Army and is working for Jardines in London and plans to transfer to India in 1915, until the Great War intervenes. James and Hazel's relationship quickly deteriorates, and, by August 1914, they are sleeping in separate bedrooms. The often-unfaithful James has grown increasingly fond of Georgina, his stepcousin and father's ward, who arrived to live at Eaton Place right before Christmas in December 1913.

== The Great War ==
As the Great War approaches, James is recalled to service as he is on the Army's Reserve of Officers. He serves at the Western Front and fought in the Second Battle of Ypres. In April 1915, he returns home on leave and during dinner, at which Sir Geoffrey Dillon is present, makes comments about the incompetent running of the war. These comments are soon published in The Daily Mail, and while the comments are unattributed, it is traced to James. James is transferred to become a General staff officer and posted miles behind the front line, much against James's wishes. The following year, while James is again home on leave, Hazel sees how unhappy he is. She secretly asks the colonel to transfer him back to the front line. The colonel agrees, and James is reassigned to the Guards Division of the Machine Gun Corps.

When Georgina arrives in France as a VAD nurse in June 1916, she meets James, who is now a major. They spend the day together, and before they part at the end of the day, they kiss. For his part in the Battle of the Somme, James is awarded the Military Cross. In October 1917, James participates in one of the many skirmishes in the Battle of Passchendaele and is reported: "missing believed killed". After ten days, he turns up seriously wounded at Georgina's hospital. Against Georgina's advice, Richard and Hazel take him back to London in a private ambulance (a converted limousine provided by James' maternal grandmother, the old Dowager Duchess of Southwold). When back home, James tells Richard about his ten days missing; a German officer was about to shoot him when he found him injured in a shell hole but, for some unknown reason, he did not and gave James the chance to shoot him instead. James also says he felt his mother's presence while in the shell hole. James sees no further active service for the rest of the war. On 8 November 1918, days before its end, Hazel dies during the Spanish flu pandemic and is buried on Armistice Day.

== Post-war years ==
After the war, James has difficulty adapting to life outside the army. In February 1920, he writes a letter to The Times regarding the treatment of former soldiers. On the strength of that letter, he is persuaded to stand as the Conservative candidate in an upcoming by-election in the Docklands seat of Rotherhithe East, a safe Labour seat. While he loses the election, he reduces the Labour majority and Conservative Central Office want him to stand again. However, he has no further interest in politics. A chance encounter with Diana Newbury, his former flame and wife of his best friend, in May 1923 leads to them staying in a country cottage together for a week. They decide to almost-elope. However, a note left by Diana to Bunny is read earlier than expected and, before they can leave Britain, Richard finds out and insists that James return to London. While Bunny says that Diana may divorce him if that is what she truly wants, James and Diana agree that time has moved on and they could not live together.

In 1927 or 1928, while holidaying in Scotland, James tells Georgina that he loves her. But she says that she does not love him in that way anymore, and early the next morning he leaves without saying goodbye to anybody. He then goes to Liverpool and sails to New York City to stay with Elizabeth, who had moved there with her husband Dana around 1911. James does not return until October 1929 and has more money thanks to the stock market. However, on 24 October, the stock market crashes and James loses his entire fortune. Days before the crash, he had encouraged Rose to invest the £1200 she had received from Gregory Wilmot in his will, and she too loses all her money. He and Richard have a heated argument about this, as James cannot repay Rose, and about how James has failed to make anything of himself despite his upbringing and all his advantages. James privately goes to a hotel in Maidenhead and commits suicide by shooting himself.
