= Upstairs, Downstairs (1971 TV series) =

British drama television series (1971–1975)

- Genre: Drama
- Created by: Jean Marsh; Eileen Atkins; John Hawkesworth; John Whitney
- Developed by: Alfred Shaughnessy
- Written by: Jean Marsh; Alfred Shaughnessy; John Hawkesworth; Fay Weldon
- Starring: David Langton; Rachel Gurney; Simon Williams; Nicola Pagett; Gordon Jackson; Angela Baddeley; Patsy Smart; Jean Marsh; George Innes; Evin Crowley; Pauline Collins; Christopher Beeny; Jenny Tomasin; John Alderton; Meg Wynn Owen; Lesley-Anne Down; Jacqueline Tong; Hannah Gordon; Gareth Hunt; Karen Dotrice; Joan Benham
- Theme music composer: Alexander Faris
- Opening theme: "The Edwardians"
- Ending theme: "What Are We Going to Do with Uncle Arthur?"
- Country of origin: United Kingdom
- Original language: English
- No. of series: 5
- No. of episodes: 68 (list of episodes)

Production
- Executive producer: Rex Firkin
- Producer: John Hawkesworth
- Running time: 50 minutes
- Production company: LWT

Original release
- Network: ITV
- Release: 10 October 1971 – 21 December 1975

Related
- Upstairs Downstairs (2010 TV series)

Upstairs, Downstairs is a British drama television series produced by London Weekend Television (LWT) for ITV. It ran for 68 episodes divided into five series on ITV from 1971 to 1975.

Set in a large townhouse at 165 Eaton Place in Belgravia in central London, the series depicts the servants—"downstairs"—and their masters, the family—"upstairs"—between 1903 and 1930, and shows the slow decline of the British aristocracy. Great events feature prominently in each episode but minor or gradual changes are also noted. The show may be regarded as a fictional view of the social and technological changes that occurred during those 27 years, including the Edwardian period, women's suffrage, the First World War, the Roaring Twenties, and the Wall Street crash. It was a ratings success for ITV and received outstanding acclaim worldwide, winning multiple awards.

The BBC Wales and Masterpiece-produced continuation Upstairs Downstairs was broadcast by BBC One in 2010.

== Background ==
Upstairs, Downstairs was originally an idea by two actress friends, Jean Marsh and Eileen Atkins, for a comedy titled Behind the Green Baize Door. It focused on two housemaids, played by Marsh and Atkins, in a large English country house in the Victorian era. They soon added a family upstairs, as Marsh recognised "Servants have to serve somebody". In summer 1969, they took this idea to Sagitta Productions, which was run by John Hawkesworth and John Whitney. They soon removed the comedy element, changed the setting to a large townhouse in Edwardian London and the title became Below Stairs. It was first offered to Granada Television in Manchester, but it declined as it already had a period drama, titled A Family at War, about to start. However, Stella Richman, the controller of Programmes at London Weekend Television, saw potential, and in April 1970, the first series was commissioned.

Characters were then developed, but when Alfred Shaughnessy, an old friend of John Hawkesworth, was called in as script editor, he changed much of the detail to make the characters more realistic. Honor Blackman was short-listed for the role of Lady Marjorie and George Cole for that of the butler, Hudson. Jean Marsh was already slated to take the part of Rose Buck, the head house parlourmaid. Eileen Atkins was scheduled to play the other maid, Sarah Moffat, opposite Jean Marsh's Rose, but was playing Elizabeth I in Vivat! Vivat Regina! at the time, so Pauline Collins took the role. Gordon Jackson was offered the role of Hudson after it was decided that Londoner George Cole was not suitable to play a Scotsman. The programme took many names, including Two Little Maids in Town, The Servants' Hall and That House in Eaton Square. It was titled 165 Eaton Place until just before the production of the first episode when it was changed to Upstairs, Downstairs, following a suggestion from John Hawkesworth.

Despite having a champion in Stella Richman, the show suffered from internal politics at the station, most notably from the sales department who could not see the attraction of a period drama, and the programme's videotapes spent nearly a year in storage awaiting a transmission date. Eventually the network had a space in its schedule at the unfashionable time of Sunday nights at 10:15 and called upon LWT to fill it. It chose Upstairs, Downstairs, and with no promotion of the show, there was little expectation of success. However, audiences steadily grew, and the series became a hit. In the United States, Upstairs, Downstairs was aired as part of PBS' Masterpiece Theatre.

== Plot ==
The stories depict the lives of the wealthy Bellamy family ("upstairs"), who reside at 165 Eaton Place in London's fashionable Belgravia, and their servants ("downstairs").

The series opens in 1903 London. Lady Marjorie Bellamy (née Talbot-Carey), the daughter of the Earl and Countess of Southwold, and her husband Richard Bellamy MP, a country parson's son, reside at 165 Eaton Place, one of several properties Lord Southwold owns. Several plots revolve around Richard's political ambitions and conflicts arising from his ethical beliefs and allegiance to his father-in-law's politically conservative Tory party.

Richard and Lady Marjorie Bellamy have two grown children, James, who is in his early 20s, and Elizabeth, who is in her late teens. In 1912, James's wife Hazel becomes the mistress of the house following Lady Marjorie's death. In 1913, Richard's ward, Georgina, comes to live at 165 Eaton Place.

The original servants are the authoritarian butler Mr. Angus Hudson, cook Mrs. Kate Bridges, pragmatic head house parlour maid, Rose Buck, sweet Irish kitchen maid Emily, eccentric footman Alfred, mischievous under-house parlour maid Sarah, coachman Pearce, and Lady Marjorie's lady's maid Maude Roberts. Over the years they are joined by Edward, a cheeky footman who later becomes a chauffeur; Daisy, the parlour maid who eventually marries Edward; Thomas Watkins, the devious chauffeur who dallies with Sarah's affections; and Ruby, the slow-witted kitchen maid.

In the episode "Another Year" from series 4, Hazel Bellamy notes that two families live in the house, one upstairs and also the other downstairs: Mr Hudson and Mrs Bridges are the father and mother; Rose, the eldest daughter; their son Edward and daughter-in-law Daisy; and Ruby, the youngest child.

=== Series One (set 1903–1908) ===
The first and second series span the period 1903 to 1910, during the reign of Edward VII. In 1903, Sarah Moffat applies to be under-house-parlour maid for the Bellamy family, pretending to be of French parentage but soon revealed to be illiterate, English, and with no work history. Later in the year, Lady Marjorie poses for bohemian artist Mr Scone (which he pronounces "skoon"), who over the same period paints an intimate portrait of Sarah and (an imagined) Rose, the Bellamy's head house maid; he exhibits both paintings juxtaposed at the Royal Academy. Fearing a scandal, Bellamy threatens to sack the two maids but is dissuaded by Scone. Later, the Bellamys holiday in Scotland. With Mr Hudson also absent, the servants carouse drunkenly through the house only to be caught by the Bellamy son James, who promises not to disclose their misbehaviour. James and Sarah later have an affair that results in Sarah's pregnancy. James is banished to India, while Sarah is sent to the Southwold estate for the duration of her pregnancy.

Around 1905, daughter Elizabeth returns from Germany and prepares to be presented to the King and the Queen Consort at a social event. Her rebellious, headstrong nature causes her to flee the event. She later talks with servant Rose, who lectures her about the importance of duty and how it applies to the entire household.

Elizabeth soon falls in love with German Baron Klaus von Rimmer, unaware that he is gay and is using her in a scheme to obtain naval secrets from her father. Rose catches him having sex with Alfred, the footman, and he flees Eaton Place before the police arrive to arrest them. To spare Elizabeth the real reason for his departure, she is told that he is a spy. Alfred is replaced by Edward Barnes, a young and naive footman whose fun-loving and immature nature initially annoys Mr Hudson.

In the summer of 1906, Lady Marjorie has brief affair with her son James's friend, Captain Charles Hammond. While Lady Bellamy and Rose are away in the country, a new under-house-parlour maid, Mary Stokes, arrives. She is pregnant, having been raped by Myles Radford, the son of a powerful politician and a Bellamy family friend. Richard Bellamy attempts to help Mary, but the Radfords refuse to take responsibility and the legal system proves ineffective. Mary quits, but departs with a small gift of money from some of the servants.

The following year, 1907, Mrs Van Groeben arrives from South Africa. Housemaid Emily falls passionately in love with Mrs Van Groeben's footman, William. Mrs Van Groeben learns of the affair, and, considering Emily beneath William, forbids him to see her. William drops Emily when he learns of his mistress's disapproval, suggesting he never really cared about her. Emily takes her own life. Mrs Bridges, distraught with remorse over Emily's death, steals a baby from its pram outside a shop and hides it in her room. The baby is returned to its parents by Richard and Lady Marjorie, and Mrs Bridges only escapes a jail sentence after Hudson agrees to marry her once they are no longer in service. The scullery maid position is first filled by Doris, then by Nellie, and finally by Ruby, who is rather slow and is frequently scolded by Mrs Bridges.

In 1908, daughter Elizabeth Bellamy marries Lawrence Kirbridge, a young poet.

=== Series Two (set 1908–1910) ===
Somewhat indifferent to his new responsibilities as a householder, Lawrence also avoids marital relations with Elizabeth, claiming he prefers her to be pure and muse-like, leaving their marriage unconsummated. Elizabeth has a brief affair with Lawrence's publisher, which Lawrence facilitates. Elizabeth becoming pregnant, giving birth to a daughter, Lucy Elizabeth. Elizabeth joins militant suffragettes who attack the home of a prominent politician, resulting in her being arrested. A wealthy Armenian, Julius Karekin, bails her out. They become romantically involved, and he buys a hat shop for her to manage. Karekin is more interested in buying his way into British society than Elizabeth's affections. He buys the lease of 165 Eaton Place after the Bellamys are forced to sell after Lady Marjorie's father dies 1909. He offers the lease to Elizabeth who then gives it to her parents. Richard and Lady Marjorie are now morally in Karekin's debt.

A pregnant Sarah returns to Eaton Place the night the Bellamys host the king for dinner; Sarah goes into labour, but the baby, a son, is stillborn. James eventually returns from India just before his mother's birthday on 6 May 1910 (which coincides with the death of King Edward VII). He brings his brash and gushing fiancée, Phyllis, the daughter of an army veterinarian. James eventually breaks off the engagement, however, realising that Phyllis is wrong for him.

Elizabeth moves to America in 1910 after splitting from Karekin and divorcing Kirbridge. She later married a man named Dana. Sarah falls in love with chauffeur, Thomas Watkins, who previously worked as Lawrence Kirbridge's valet. Sarah becomes pregnant again and will be dismissed. Thomas offers to marry her, though no one knows it is actually his child. To avoid any scandal, Lord Bellamy arranges for them to leave service and start their own business. While in the Upstairs, Downstairs episode "A Family Gathering" it is stated that Thomas and Sarah were married; this fact is disregarded in the spin-off series Thomas & Sarah.

In episode 9, "An Object of Value", veteran British actress Cathleen Nesbitt appears as Lady Southwold, Lady Marjorie's mother. At the end of the second season, actresses Rachel Gurney (as Lady Marjorie) and Nicola Pagett (as Elizabeth) permanently left the series, but Gurney appeared briefly in the premiere episode of the third season ("Miss Forrest"). Pagett's character of Elizabeth never was seen again but was mentioned throughout the remainder of the series. Actresses Meg Wynn Owen as Hazel Forrest Bellamy, James's wife; and Lesley-Anne Down as Georgina Worsley, Richard's ward and James's cousin became the major female upstairs characters.

=== Series Three (set 1912–1914) ===
In 1912, Lady Marjorie, her brother, Hugo Talbot-Carey (the Earl of Southwold), and his wife (widow Marion Worsley) all perish in the RMS Titanic disaster. Miss Roberts, Lady Marjorie's maid, also thought to have died, survived and unexpectedly returns to Eaton Place. She refuses to relinquish Marjorie's jewellery box, believing she is keeping it for her. Richard's new secretary, Hazel Forrest, gently persuades Miss Roberts to accept that Lady Marjorie is gone; she breaks down sobbing, saying she tried to save her.

Hazel Forrest was hired to type the biography of Richard's father-in-law, the old Earl of Southwold, that he is writing. She and James fall in love and eventually marry. Hazel, from a respectable middle-class family, becomes mistress of the household. She and James are happy for a time but grow apart due to their differing backgrounds. Their estrangement is worsened by Hazel's miscarriage in the spring of 1914.

Georgina Worsley, James's 18-year-old cousin, comes to live with the Bellamys at Christmas 1913. Georgina is the orphaned stepdaughter of Lady Marjorie's brother Hugo. She befriends Daisy, the new parlour maid. Georgina decides she and Daisy should take food to Daisy's struggling family. She is shocked to see that Daisy's family live in miserable, abject poverty.

Rose, the head house parlour maid, is shocked when Alfred, the Bellamys' former footman, turns up at Eaton Place one night. He claims his former employer sacked him and is now homeless. She hides him in a basement room. It later transpires that Alfred is actually on the run from the police for murdering his previous employer. Alfred is arrested and eventually hanged for murder. The following year, Rose briefly becomes engaged to an Australian sheep-farmer named Gregory Wilmot whom she meets on a tram. She agrees to move to Australia with him, but at embarkation she decides to remain at Eaton Place, a plot line that echoes the story "Eveline" in James Joyce's Dubliners.

Richard, who has sold the house's lease to James after Lady Marjorie's death (all her money passed on to James and Elizabeth), makes money after a share tip-off from a member of his gentleman's club. Richard later is unjustly accused of insider dealing. It is only Hazel's and Hudson's intervention that saves his career and reputation. This plot was inspired by the Marconi scandal of 1912.

During a visit to Somerby, the country house of James's school-friend Lord "Bunny" Newbury in the autumn of 1913, Edward unwittingly becomes a witness in an impending divorce when he spies rising Tory MP Lord Charles Gilmour leaving the bedroom of a fellow MP's wife. Edward is pressured to change his story, but he refuses, and the case is withdrawn due to Richard's influence.

The servants are offered a day's holiday in Herne Bay in Kent in August 1914. They enjoy a rare day out together. Hudson is persuaded to sing on the vaudeville stage but their enjoyment is curtailed by an announcement that Germany has invaded Belgium. Hudson instead sings "Rule Britannia". Back in London, they gather to mark the hour when Britain goes to war.

In the Christmas episode, "Goodwill to All Men", Cathleen Nesbitt returns for a second and final appearance as Lady Southwold.

=== Series Four (set 1914–1918) ===
James serves in World War I, is seriously injured and brought home, amid much difficulty, to recover. He is nursed by his step-cousin Georgina, who now volunteers as a VAD Nurse and serves in France during the war. Georgina and James develop a close affection during the war but do not become lovers. Downstairs, Edward signs up and fights in the trenches, Hudson serves as a Special Constable, Rose works as a bus conductress, and Ruby leaves Eaton Place to work in a munitions factory in Silvertown, returning to service after the Silvertown explosion. Hazel, unknowingly echoing her late mother-in-law Lady Marjorie, has a brief affair with an RFC Lieutenant named Jack Dyson who, like herself, has risen from the ranks of the middle classes. He is killed while James is home on leave. Rose meets up with Gregory Wilmot again. After overcoming their emotional and practical hurdles, she agrees to marry him on his return from the war and follow him to Australia. However, he is killed in action. Rose is heartbroken but Gregory has left her £1,275 in his will, enough for an independent retirement. Edward returns, and while not physically wounded, suffers from severe shell shock and goes into hospital. Richard comforts him, assuring Edward that mental wounds are as real as physical, and no mark on his character.

The fourth season ends in 1918 with World War I ending and James and Georgina returning home. Hazel contracts influenza in the worldwide pandemic and dies. Grief-stricken, Georgina comfort him, but stops him from any closeness. Richard is elevated to the House of Lords as Viscount Bellamy of Haversham in the New Year Honours List of 1919.

At the end of the fourth series Meg Wynn Owen left the show, with her character Hazel dying of influenza in the Spanish flu pandemic. The character of Virginia Hamilton, played by Hannah Gordon, was introduced in the fourth series when she asked Richard for help regarding her son.

=== Series Five (set 1919–1930) ===
At the start of the fifth season, James is grieving Hazel's death. Richard marries widow Virginia Hamilton, after the events of the fourth series when she asked Richard and his solicitor Sir Geoffrey Dillon (Raymond Huntley), to defend her son, Michael, who was charged with cowardice during the war. He was acquitted but later killed. Richard and Virginia return from their honeymoon. With only himself and Georgina living at Eaton Place, James considers dismissing the servants and selling the house. He wants Richard and Virginia to move in, but Virginia wants her own home. Collaborating with Georgina, James invites Richard, Virginia, and her two children, Alice, aged 10 and William, aged 6, to tea. The house comes alive with their visit. James, Georgina, and the servants welcome them wholeheartedly and Virginia is convinced this is perfect home. Alice becomes attached to Rose, whose duties keep her upstairs with the children and the new Lady Bellamy.

Downstairs, Edward and a pregnant Daisy have left Eaton Place and are replaced by Frederick (James's batman during the war) and Lily, respectively. Edward's job prospects are dim, and Daisy miscarries due to malnutrition; both are re-hired at Eaton Place as chauffeur and house parlour maid, respectively. Rose tends the children and is Lady Virginia's lady's maid.

William is sent to a boarding school while Alice resumes her schooling with Miss Treadwell. To compensate for William's absence, Rose gives Alice a cairn terrier named Thimble. While Lord and Lady Bellamy are away, Miss Treadwell quickly assumes the role as head of the house alienating the servants and mentally and physically abuses Alice and her dog. Upon their return, Lord and Lady Bellamy dismiss Miss Treadwell. Richard and Virginia then decide that Alice should go to a day school for her studies. After that instalment, Alice, William, and the dog are never seen again, but they are frequently referred to, and Alice returns for a brief appearance in the final episode.

Downstairs, romance blooms between Hudson and Lily, but she spurns him and Lily leaves her position. Frederick leaves service at the Bellamy house when he discovers the allure of escorting young upper-class women to balls and other functions. Also during this season, the roles played by actresses Jenny Tomasin and Joan Benham were expanded to show character depth. For Tomasin, the role of the childlike, simple-minded kitchen maid Ruby Finch was showcased in two episodes – the eighth instalment "Such A Lovely Man" where Ruby meets a man named Herbert through magazine correspondence, but rejects him because "he was no Rudolph Valentino"; and the fourteenth chapter of the series, "Noblesse Oblige" in which Ruby, fed up and disgusted with Mrs. Bridges's treatment of her, temporarily leaves her position at Eaton Place after they have a bitter quarrel. Benham's character of Lady Prudence Fairfax (or Pru as she was affectionately referred to) had been featured throughout the previous four series as a long time close friend of the Bellamy family who was a delightful social butterfly always welcome at family parties and events, as well as a harmless gossipy woman. However, in the fifth series, Benham was able to show another side of Lady Prudence – as a wise, kind, loyal, loving, and devoted friend to the Bellamys in two instalments – in the fourth episode "Joy Ride" and the eleventh episode, "Alberto".

In the roaring 1920s, Georgina and her friends rebel against the depression and hard times of the post-war period, but her frivolity and merriment quickly end – first after the suicide of a friend who professed his love for her and threatened to kill himself unless she married him, and then killed himself during a Roaring 20s party at the Bellamy house. Second, Georgina accidentally kills a working-class man after taking Richard's car without permission and driving it herself to compete in a scavenger hunt. Her friends, part of the moneyed, bored and pleasure-seeking "bright young things", desert her at the inquest. Only the rich but shallow Lady Dolly Hale and also the seemingly dull Lord Robert Stockbridge, heir to a dukedom, defend her. Georgina and Robert quickly fall in love. James suffers long-term emotional stress from his war experiences and Hazel's death. Restless, he stands for Parliament, but loses the election.

Lord Stockbridge's parents send their son on a trip around the world to try to wean him from Georgina, under the guise of helping him discover whether his feelings are true. James returns from America in October 1929, where he has visited Elizabeth and become rich through speculation on Wall Street. Rose allows James to invest the money Gregory left her when he died in the war, but the market crashes and James loses everything. James had also "borrowed a fair bit" that he now is unable to repay. He has disgraced his family and taken advantage of a member of staff who trusted him. Depressed and ashamed, he goes to a hotel in Maidenhead and kills himself.

The final episode, set in 1930, finds things looking up at Eaton Place as Georgina marries Lord Stockbridge on 12 June 1930. Mr Hudson and Mrs Bridges also finally marry, and take the uneducated but surprisingly shrewd kitchen maid, Ruby Finch, to the seaside with them, to run a guest house. When asked by Rose how she feels about becoming part of the Hudsons' household, Ruby says, "They'll not last long, and I'll have guest house all to meself." Lord Bellamy has delivered his retirement speech to the House of Lords. He and Virginia retreat to a small villa in Dorset, keeping Rose Buck in their employ. Young Edward and his wife, Daisy, are elevated to the posts of butler and head house parlourmaid in the country household of the marquess and new marchioness of Stockbridge.

The last scene shows Rose taking a final walk through the now empty rooms at 165 Eaton Place, which is for sale. She 'hears' in her head the voices of Lady Marjorie, Mr. Hudson, and others, as well as the many incidents she witnessed over the years. On hearing James reassuring her about Gregory's honourable death in the war echoing in her ears, she becomes spooked and hurriedly leaves through the front door.

== Episodes ==
Series	Episodes	Originally released	
Series	Episodes	First released	Last released
1	13	10 October 1971	20 March 1972
2	13	21 October 1972	19 January 1973
3	13	27 October 1973	19 January 1974
4	13	14 September 1974	7 December 1974
5	16	7 September 1975	21 December 1975

Upstairs, Downstairs ran for five series from 10 December 1971 to 21 December 1975. The first four series had thirteen episodes each, while the final series had sixteen. Due to an industrial dispute over extra payments for using newly introduced colour equipment, during which broadcasting unions refused to allow their members to use colour cameras, the first six episodes of the first series were shot in black-and-white, and when colour production resumed, the first episode was remade in colour. Two endings were made, which could be shown depending on whether the black and white episodes were broadcast by the channel. The original black-and-white version of the first episode is believed to have been wiped.

The opening credits of each episode featured a cartoon from the magazine Punch, and the lettering was drawn by the graphic designer Terry Griffiths. The theme tune was composed by Alexander Faris and titled The Edwardians. It won an Ivor Novello Award. Part of this tune was made into the song What Are We Going to Do with Uncle Arthur?, sung by Sarah, with lyrics written by Alfred Shaughnessy. Pauline Collins released this as a single in 1973. The theme tune was used as the processional march for the church wedding of Elizabeth and Lawrence in series 1, episode 13: For Love of Love.

Many writers wrote episodes throughout the five series, including Alfred Shaughnessy, John Hawkesworth, Fay Weldon, Terence Brady and Charlotte Bingham, John Harrison, Julian Bond, Raymond Bowers, Jeremy Paul, Rosemary Anne Sisson, Anthony Skene and Elizabeth Jane Howard.

== Production ==
Each episode of Upstairs, Downstairs was made in a fortnightly production schedule. The book Inside Updown has a detailed production history. The first week and a half were spent rehearsing, with two days in the studio, and the latter part of the second day being used for recording. Location footage was usually shot beforehand. The exterior shots of 165 Eaton Place were filmed at 65 Eaton Place with the "1" painted on. Upstairs, Downstairs was one of the first major colour productions to be made by LWT. Interior sequences were first recorded in LWT's first studio facility in Wembley in London, for all of series one and the episode "A Pair of Exiles" in series two. For the rest of series two, and for the remaining three series, the interior sequences were recorded in LWT's new studio complex named Kent House (later known as The London Studios) on London's Southbank.

According to Jean Marsh and Simon Williams, at the end of the fourth series they, along with other cast members, were eager to move on to other projects. However, with much persuasion by the producers and writers, they, along with the rest of the cast, agreed to do a fifth and final series showing the Bellamy family and staff entering the decade of the twenties and ending the series with the start of the Great Depression. During the final series, Marsh and Williams reduced their appearances on the show, both appearing in only 11 instalments out of the sixteen episodes produced. In addition, eight new cast members were added to the series, which included two servants, Frederick and Lily, played by Gareth Hunt and Karen Dotrice; Richard Bellamy's new wife, Virginia (played by Hannah Gordon); Virginia's two children Alice and William (Anne Yarker and Jonathan Seely); Shirley Cain as Miss Treadwell, the children's governess; Madeleine Cannon as Lady Dorothy (Dolly) Hale, Georgina's self-centred, catty, fair weather friend; and Anthony Andrews as Lord (Robert) Stockbridge, Georgina's fiancé and husband.

Herne Bay features in series three, episode thirteen "The Sudden Storm", when the staff take a day out to the seaside.

The show featured the song "What Are We Going to Do with Uncle Arthur?", written by Alexander Faris and Alfred Shaughnessy. Faris had also written the instrumental theme tune for the series. The song is a mildly bawdy music hall number performed by the character Sarah Moffat. Her performance of the song in the episode "For Love of Love" draws the interest of James Bellamy, leading to a dramatic subplot within the ongoing story of the Bellamys. A lively instrumental version of the song was played over the closing credits of each programme in the series.

== Awards ==
Upstairs, Downstairs was nominated for and won many national and international awards, winning two BAFTA awards, two Royal Television Society awards, three Writers Guild Awards, eight Emmys, and a Golden Globe. It was nominated for a further seven BAFTAs, nine Emmys and four Golden Globes. It was nominated for the BAFTA Television Award for Best Drama Series in 1972, 1973, 1975, and 1976, winning in 1972 and 1974. Pauline Collins was nominated for Best Actress in 1973 for her portrayal of Sarah Moffat, and Gordon Jackson was nominated for Best Actor for playing Mr. Hudson in 1975.

In the United States, Upstairs, Downstairs was honoured with both the Primetime Emmy Awards and the Golden Globe Awards. In 1974, 1975, and 1977 it won the Primetime Emmy Award for Outstanding Drama Series. In 1975, Jean Marsh won the Primetime Emmy Award for Outstanding Lead Actress in a Drama Series, and Bill Bain won the Primetime Emmy Award for Outstanding Directing for a Drama Series. The following year, it won for Outstanding Limited Series, and Gordon Jackson won for Outstanding Single Performance by a Supporting Actor in Comedy or Drama Series, and Angela Baddeley was nominated for Outstanding Continuing Performance by a Supporting Actress in a Drama Series. In 1977, Jacqueline Tong was nominated for Outstanding Continuing Performance by a Supporting Actress in a Drama Series. For the Golden Globes, Upstairs, Downstairs won the Golden Globe Award for Best TV Show – Drama in 1975 and was nominated again for the same award in 1978. Jean Marsh was nominated in 1975 and 1977 for Best TV Actress – Drama.

Alfred Shaughnessy, script editor and frequent writer, was nominated for a Primetime Emmy Award twice for the episodes "Miss Forrest" and "Another Year". John Hawkesworth, frequent writer and producer, was nominated for Outstanding Writing for a Drama Series for the episode "The Bolter". Fay Weldon won a Writers Guild of America Award for Best British TV Series Script of 1971 for "On Trial".

In 2013, the Writers Guild of America ranked Upstairs, Downstairs at number 79 on its list of the 101 Best Written TV Series.

== Spin-offs ==
Following the final episode of Upstairs, Downstairs many ideas for spin-offs evolved. These included having the new Lord and Lady Stockbridge buying back 165 Eaton Place and an American company wanted to make a programme based around Hudson and Rose emigrating to the United States. Jack Webb was interested in a series of Marsh and Gordon Jackson reprising their roles as head of a Los Angeles employment agency. Another idea, titled You Live or You Die, was to have Frederick Norton seeking his fortune in the U.S. Another idea followed Hudson, Mrs Bridges and Ruby running their seaside boarding house, and this probably would have been made had it not been for the death of Angela Baddeley on 22 February 1976. The only spin-off to make it onscreen was Thomas & Sarah, broadcast in 1979, and it followed the adventures of Thomas and Sarah after they left Eaton Place. Although very popular, only one series was made as filming of a second series was postponed by strike action at ITV and never resumed. Only a few location scenes were shot and these were later wiped.

A short-lived series titled Beacon Hill, which aired in the fall of 1975, was loosely based upon Upstairs, Downstairs; its executive producer, Beryl Vertue, was Jean Marsh's literary agent and had been responsible for helping sell the original Upstairs, Downstairs to LWT.

In 2011, the BBC ran a series titled Royal Upstairs Downstairs in which Tim Wonnacott and Rosemary Shrager tour country houses visited by Queen Victoria. Tim tours the upstairs concentrating on the architecture and events of Victoria's visit, and Rosemary concentrates on the downstairs, demonstrating recipes cooked for the queen.

== Novelisations ==
Each series of Upstairs, Downstairs was accompanied by a novelisation, with additional detail in each, but also with some episodes missing. All books were published by Sphere Books. The novelisation of the first series, Upstairs, Downstairs or the secrets of an Edwardian household, was written by John Hawkesworth and published in 1972. Hawkesworth also wrote the series two novelisation, In My Lady's Chamber and this was published in 1973. The following year, The Years of Change, Mollie Hardwick's novelisation of the third series, was published and she also wrote the 1975 The War to End Wars, the fourth series novelisation. The fifth series, which was longer than the others, was novelised in two books, both by Michael Hardwick and published in 1975. They were titled On with the Dance and Endings and Beginnings.

As well as these novelisations, five books were separately published, again by Sphere Books, with each being the biography of a main character before the series started. Rose's Story was written by Terence Brady & Charlotte Bingham and published in 1972. The following year, Mollie Hardwick's Sarah's Story and Michael Hardwick's Mr Hudson's Diaries were both published. Mr Bellamy's Story, by Michael Hardwick, was published in 1974 and Mrs Bridge's Story by Mollie Hardwick was published in 1975. Also in 1975, The Upstairs, Downstairs Omnibus, featuring all five slightly edited stories, was published.

John Pearson published The Bellamys of Eaton Place (a.k.a. The Bellamy Saga) in 1976.

== Influence ==
The BBC series The Duchess of Duke Street is widely seen as the BBC's answer to Upstairs, Downstairs, not least because some of the same producers and writers worked on it, and it has a theme tune by Faris. The 1990 BBC sitcom You Rang, M'Lord? also featured a similar situation. In 1975, an American version, titled Beacon Hill, debuted but due to low ratings it was soon cancelled, running for just thirteen episodes. Tom Wolfe called Upstairs, Downstairs a plutography, i.e. a "graphic depiction of the lives of the rich".

A Monsterpiece Theater sketch on Sesame Street, introduced/narrated by Cookie Monster (as Alistair Cookie, a play on Alistair Cooke, who was at that time the host of Masterpiece Theater) was titled Upstairs, Downstairs and featured Grover running up and down a staircase until collapsing from exhaustion.

In 2000, a stop-motion animated series titled Upstairs, Downstairs Bears, co-produced by Canada's Cinar and Scottish Television for the CITV block, was based upon Upstairs, Downstairs. Ironically, it happened to air on the last day of London Weekend Television's broadcasting under that brand (as part of the CITV block) on 27 October 2002; the next day LWT was subsumed into ITV London.

Company Pictures' 2008 television series The Palace has been described as a "modern Upstairs, Downstairs" as it features the points of view of both a fictional royal family and their servants.

From November 2008 to January 2010, variations (played in different styles, e.g., a fugue, jazz, calypso, death metal) of the theme music were played on BBC Radio 4's PM programme to introduce a segment titled "Upshares, Downshares", in which Nils Blythe ran through the day's business news. In November 2010, with the composer Alexander Faris's blessing, a special CD of collected versions was released to raise money for the charity Children in Need.

The ITV series Downton Abbey, which ran from 2010 to 2015, has many similarities with Upstairs, Downstairs. Both series depict a noble family and their servants in the context of some of the same historical events; certain storylines and characterisations also appear in both series. In 2019, Downton Abbey's executive producer Gareth Neame acknowledged the inspiration, stating that upon watching Upstairs, Downstairs for the first time as an adult, he realised that "there's two generations now who have got something new to be exposed to" because they had never seen Upstairs, Downstairs.

== Revival ==
In 2009, the BBC announced it was to broadcast a revival of the series, with Jean Marsh reprising her role as Rose alongside a new cast in the same Eaton Place household. The series was created and written by Heidi Thomas. The first series aired from 26 December 2010. Eileen Atkins appeared in the first series, but left her role before production on the second series began.

== Home media ==
=== Region One DVDs ===
Upstairs, Downstairs was first released to Region One DVD in December 2001 by A&E Home Entertainment. During 2002, it released the remaining series and then released Thomas and Sarah on DVD in 2004. The individual releases have been collected into two boxed sets, the second of which, The Collector's Edition Megaset, also includes Thomas and Sarah. These are all out of print. In 2011, Acorn Media released Upstairs Downstairs: The Ultimate Collection, which includes Thomas and Sarah and 25 hours of special features in a 40th anniversary, 26-disc set.

=== Region Two DVDs ===
Upstairs, Downstairs was released on DVD by VCI in Region 2 (UK). The colour episodes of the first series were released in 2001 followed by the other series finishing in 2003. In 2004, the black-and-white episodes and the first episode with the original ending were released. Thomas & Sarah was released in matching packaging in 2004. In 2005, VCI stopped making these DVDs, none of which had included any extras.

Network Video released the entire programme series-by-series from 2005 to 2006. The episodes were remastered and the black-and-white episodes were put in chronological order in the first series. Some episodes also featured audio commentaries, the LWT logo, commercial bumpers and the original preceding countdowns. In addition, each series was accompanied by a special one-hour documentary relating to that series featuring new and archive interviews. The fifth series release also featured the 1975 documentary Russell Harty goes... "Upstairs, Downstairs". In 2006, a boxed set featuring all the DVDs was released.

DVDs of the series have also been released in Denmark, Finland, Germany, Netherlands, Portugal, Spain, and Sweden.

=== Region Four DVDs ===
Universal DVD released all five series to DVD in Australia and New Zealand. These later were deleted. Timelife issued the series as a mail-order collection. ITV began re-releasing the series in Australia in January 2013.

The show is rated PG in New Zealand for its low-level violence.

Region 4 Releases
DVD title	Universal	Time Life	ITV	Via Vision
Series 1	19 February 2003	30 August 2008	3 May 2012	NA
Series 2	22 April 2003	29 November 2008	TBA	NA
Series 3	15 September 2004	29 November 2008	3 April 2013	NA
Series 4	15 September 2004	2 March 2009	1 May 2013	NA
Series 5	15 September 2004	2 March 2009	2 October 2013	NA
The Complete Series	NA	28 August 2009	2 July 2014	NA
Collector's Edition (Includes Series 1–5 and Thomas & Sarah Series)	NA	10 November 2010	NA	NA
The Complete Series (Special Edition)	NA	NA	NA	21 October 2020

== See also ==
- Downton Abbey
- The Duchess of Duke Street
- The Forsyte Saga
- The Pallisers
- Thomas & Sarah
- Upstairs Downstairs (2010 TV series)
