= Baliol Holloway =

English stage actor (died 1967)

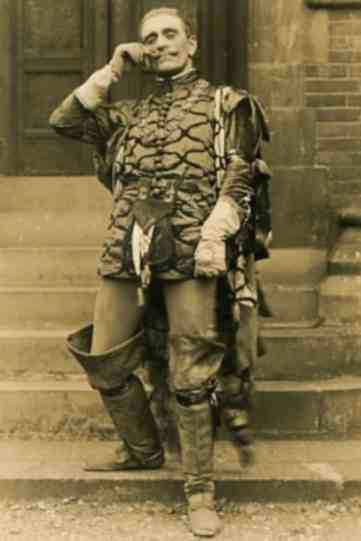
- Holloway as Parolles in a 1922 production of All's Well That Ends Well
- Born: Around 1884; Brentwood, Essex, England
- Died: 15 April 1967 (aged 83); London, England
- Occupation: Stage actor
- Years active: 1899–1949

Baliol Holloway (born around 1884, died 15 April 1967) was an English Shakespearean actor.

== Early life ==
Baliol Holloway was born in Brentwood, Essex. He was educated at Denstone in Staffordshire. He was a pupil of Hermann Vezin.

== Career ==
Holloway began his stage career in 1899 as a boy in the production of The Merchant of Venice. In 1907, Holloway joined the Benson Company. Holloway played the leading part in several Stratford-upon-Avon festivals and was leading man at The Old Vic in London from 1925 to 1928. He retired from The Old Vic in 1949. He also performed at the Open Air Theatre. He acted for the Phoenix Society. He worked alongside Edith Evans and also worked as an actor-manager. In America, he worked alongside Walter Hampden in Othello as Iago.

Holloway was known for his portrayal of Richard III in Richard III.

== Personal life ==
Holloway married and his wife died in 1959. In 1965, Holloway refused to leave his home of 52 years in Marylebone and halted a construction project. Holloway went by the nickname "Bay".

Holloway died on 15 April 1967, at the age of 83, at his home in London.

== Plays ==
- The Merchant of Venice (1899)
- The Fair Maid of the West, as Mr. Ruffman(1920)
- Timon of Athens, as Alcibiades (1920)
- Henry V, as Pistol (1920)
- Venice Preserv'd (1920), as Pierre
- Forerunners (1920), as Wolf
- Volpone (1921, 1923), as Volpone
- At Mrs. Beam's (1921), as Mr. Dermott
- Love for Love (1921), as Scandal
- Body and Soul (1922), as Procopo
- The Jew of Malta (1922), as Barabas
- Twelfth Night (1922–1923), as Orsino
- The Alchemist (1923), as Subtle
- The Winter's Tale (1923), as Autolycus
- Twelfth Night; or, What You Will (1923–1924, 1927), as Malvolio
- A Midsummer Night's Dream (1923–1924, 1926), Bottom
- Richard III (1923, 1925, 1927, 1930), as Richard III
- The Very Idea (1924), as George Green
- The Country Wife (1924), as Mr. Horner
- Measure for Measure (1924), as Lucio
- The Maid's Tragedy (1925), as Melantius
- Rule a Wife and Have a Wife (1925), as Michael Perez
- The Merchant of Venice (1925), as Shylock
- The Taming of the Shrew (1925), as Petruchio
- Measure for Measure (1925), as Angelo
- Antony and Cleopatra (1925), as Antony
- The Merry Wives of Windsor (1925–1926), as Sir John Falstaff
- She Stoops to Conquer (1926), as Young Marlow
- Julius Caesar (1926, 1932), as Caius Cassius
- As You Like It (1926), as Jaques
- The Shoemaker's Holiday (1926), as Simon Eyre
- Romeo and Juliet (1926), as Mercutio
- Much Ado About Nothing (1926), as Benedick
- King John (1926), as Philip the Bastard
- The Tempest (1926), as Caliban
- Macbeth (1926), as Macbeth
- The Chester Nativity Play: The Play of the Shepherds (1926–1927), as Harvey
- Christmas Eve (1926–1927), as Dramatist
- Everyman (1927), as Everyman
- The Comedy of Errors (1927), as Antipholus of Syracuse
- The Whirligig of Time - An Up-to-Date Revel (1927), as Macbeth
- Peace, War and Revolution (1929), as Diogenes
- Pilgrim's Progress (1948), as Worldly Wiseman
- Major Barbara, as Long John Silver
- Othello, as Iago
