= List of Upstairs Downstairs (2010 TV series) characters =

This is a list of characters from the BBC relaunch of Upstairs Downstairs, that aired from 2010. A list of the cast from the original ITV series, which ran from 1970 to 1975, can be found here.

== Upstairs ==
=== Sir Hallam Holland, Bart. ===
Portrayed by Ed Stoppard, Sir Hallam Holland is a Foreign Office diplomat, who inherited 165 Eaton Place as well as a large fortune and a baronetcy. He is married to Lady Agnes Holland, who has given birth to two children, Hector and Veronica. Sir Hallam's relationship with Lady Agnes is tested during series 2 when she becomes friendly with an American tycoon, Casper Landry. Hallam's jealousy compiled with the stress he is under at work leads him to kissing Agnes's sister, Persie. The kiss eventually leads to an affair between the two.

=== Lady Agnes Holland ===
Portrayed by Keeley Hawes, Lady Agnes Holland (née Towyn) is the eldest daughter of the 12th Earl of Towyn and wife of Sir Hallam. Her "old money" family were impoverished, and Agnes grew up in a decaying castle in the south of Wales. Her marriage to Sir Hallam has been happy and devoted, despite financial hardship before his inheritance and their failure to have children. In the series, she has two children with Sir Hallam and is told that she cannot have any more. In light of the sad news she holds a dinner party whose guests include a young John F. Kennedy and American businessman Casper Landry.

=== Maud, Lady Holland ===
Portrayed by Eileen Atkins, Maud Holland (née Mottershead), Lady Holland, born in 1860, is Sir Hallam's mother and is often seen to be causing friction between herself and Lady Agnes. She helped build the British Raj, and lived overseas for many years, returning to England after being widowed. She often lamented her unhappy marriage to her late husband, Greville. By 1938, she has died and this leaves a hole in the Holland family.

=== Lady Persephone "Persie" Towyn ===
Portrayed by Claire Foy, Lady Persephone "Persie" Towyn is the younger sister of Lady Agnes. Becoming a fascist, she has an affair with Harry Spargo, but later leaves him and her family to go to Germany with Joachim von Ribbentrop as his mistress. She is absent from Eaton Place between series 1 and 2, maintaining only minimal contact with her family, but returns in December 1938 after the anti-Semitic violence in Germany escalates. She subsequently discovers she is pregnant by one of her German lovers, and has an abortion. She then has an affair with Sir Hallam. Exposed as a spy for the Germans and left alone, she commits suicide—by throwing herself off the upper balcony onto the entrance hall floor—after accidentally shooting Beryl with Sir Hallam's service pistol.

=== Pamela Holland ===
Portrayed by Sarah Gordy, Pamela Holland is the younger sister of Sir Hallam. She has Down's syndrome and lives in an asylum. Initially, Sir Hallam has been told by his mother that Pamela died in childhood, but he comes across her while attempting to remove Lotte from the same asylum. Pamela still remembers and loves her brother and mother dearly, and she is later seen staying at her brother's house for Christmas.

=== Dr Blanche Mottershead ===
Portrayed by Alex Kingston, Blanche Mottershead, born in 1890, is the younger half-sister of the late Maud—being thirty years younger than Maud—and is therefore Sir Hallam's aunt. She arrived at 165 Eaton Place during Maud’s short final illness, and is still in situ after her death. She took the lead in helping relocate Jewish children after the intensification of antisemitic Nazism within Germany, and is also an expert Egyptologist. Blanche has an affair with Lady Portia Alresford (portrayed by Emilia Fox) which ends badly.

== Downstairs ==
=== Rose Buck ===
Portrayed by Jean Marsh, Rose Buck was born to a servant on the Southwold estate where Lady Marjorie Bellamy was born and raised. She was the head house parlour maid at Eaton Place from 1903 to 1919 (including a short stint as Elizabeth Kirbridge's lady's maid and between maid in Greenwich), and Virginia Bellamy's lady's maid from 1919 to 1930. During World War I she also worked as a conductress. She returns to Eaton Place in 1936, and assumes the position of housekeeper. In 1938 she suffers a bout of TB and is absent from the house for a while. Lady Agnes visits a frail Rose who begs her to take her key to 165 Eaton Place, as she does not feel she deserves it. In a touching moment, Lady Agnes reassures Rose that she is both wanted and needed there. At the end of the series, she goes with the Holland children as a nanny to protect them during World War II—the second war she has lived through in her lifetime.

=== Clarice Thackeray ===
Portrayed by Anne Reid. The house's cook, Clarice Thackeray is a widow. Passionate about her work, she expects the highest standards of herself and others. She follows the workings of high society through the pages of the Tatler. Romantic and affectionate by nature, she is also nosey, judgemental and a snob. Mrs Thackeray comes to blows with Mr. Pritchard in series 2 when they share the running of downstairs in Rose's absence. It comes to a head when Mr. Prichard scolds her for calling a young John F. Kennedy "my dear" and she resigns in a fit of temper. After a brief stay at her nephew's she realises she belongs in Eaton Place and returns to a smiling Mr. Pritchard.

=== Warwick Pritchard ===
Portrayed by Adrian Scarborough. Butler Warwick Pritchard is discreet and well spoken. Teetotal and highly strung, his exacting façade conceals deep kindness and real integrity. As the downstairs family settles in, he gradually becomes the moral centre of the household. His skills in service come from his several years of employment with the Cunard Line. As a former wartime ambulance man, he delivers Lady Agnes' baby with little fuss when she gives birth before preparations have been made. It is later revealed he was raised a Quaker and was a conscientious objector during the Great War. This fact angers Mr. Amanjit and Mrs Thackeray and a rift emerges downstairs, however they soon forgive him after a talk from Lady Agnes. Mr. Pritchard and Mrs Thackeray have several fights during series 2 as they disagree on how downstairs should be run. He has a brief courtship with a lady's maid but she rejects him after finding out about his history in the war. Pritchard is revealed to be a recovered alcoholic and goes back to his habit, but has recovered by the time war is declared.

=== Eunice McCabe ===
Eunice, portrayed by Ami Metcalf, is hired as kitchen maid between 1936 and 1938, and is an established member of the household by the start of series 2. She wears large round spectacles and has red hair. She is rather stupid at times, but has a lovable sense about her. After Rose is taken ill, she acts as a lady's maid to Lady Agnes before her duties are reassigned to share time between the kitchen and nursery.

=== Beryl Spargo, née Ballard ===
Beryl, portrayed by Laura Haddock, is the new nursery maid after Veronica is born but is soon re-allocated to the role of senior parlour maid. She is upset that she has to share a bed with Eunice. She gets into Mr Pritchard's bad books very quickly after she arrives and this comes to a head when she contacts a union about the long hours she and Eunice are expected to work and their poor living conditions. She falls in love with Harry and they plan to marry and emigrate to America, but Beryl is accidentally shot by Persie before the latter commits suicide. Beryl and Harry are married in the final episode and decide to stay in England and help the war effort.

=== Amanjit Singh ===
Portrayed by Art Malik. Educated, gentle, and imposing, Amanjit Singh comes to Eaton Place as secretary to Maud, Lady Holland. Having been in her service in India for many years, he is devoted to her welfare. He served in the Indian Army in the First World War and was wounded at Ypres. In Series 2, Blanche's firm nature and apparent disregard for her late half-sister's memory initially causes friction with Mr Amanjit but when they work together to evacuate Jewish children from Germany they learn to respect each other and are soon friends. Sir Hallam gives Mr Amanjit his service pistol, entrusting him with protecting the Holland household in the event of a German invasion.

=== Ivy Morris ===
Portrayed by Ellie Kendrick. Just 15 years old, orphaned Ivy Morris is spirited, wilful, and likes red nail varnish and singing in the bath. Ivy would never willingly risk her newfound security at 165, but her hunger for love leads her, and others, into danger. She has a brief romance with Johnny. She has departed the house by 1938 for unknown reasons, and is not mentioned by any characters during series 2.

=== Harry Spargo ===
Portrayed by Neil Jackson. Full name Harold Herbert Spargo. Good-looking and cocksure, Harry Spargo enjoys his position as chauffeur for Hollands, but resents the social system that keeps him there. He enjoys a cautious camaraderie with Sir Hallam, but this is put to the test in 1936 by his involvement with Oswald Mosley's British Union of Fascists. It is again put to the test in 1939 when Harry blackmails Hallam over Hallam's affair with Persie, so he would give Harry the money for him and Beryl to emigrate to America. However, Persie accidentally shoots Beryl before committing suicide. Harry and Beryl are married in the final episode and decide to stay in England and help the war effort. Harry returns the money to his employer, and Hallam says they will never mention it again.

=== Johnny Proude ===
Portrayed by Nico Mirallegro. Aged 16, Johnny Proude launches a career in domestic service in an effort to escape a life spent mining coal. Charming and hard-working, he is popular with the other servants—especially Ivy—but comes to 165 with a troubling secret: he is on probation. Johnny has turned 19 by the fifth episode of Series 2, as mentioned by Pritchard. In series 2, Harry trains him as a boxer but Johnny gives it up after a society playboy makes a pass at him. At the end of series 2 he is passed A1 (fit for military service) and expects to be called up any day.

=== Rachel Perlmutter ===
Portrayed by Helen Bradbury. Rachel Perlmutter is a German-Jewish refugee who comes to 165, as the new parlour maid, in May 1936. Reserved and sophisticated, having been a university lecturer in pre-Nazi Germany, Rachel knows little about basic household chores (though she has little tricks that surprise the rest of the staff), but is determined to make the best of her circumstances. Her husband has been imprisoned by the Nazis, for communist activities. She has a daughter, whose existence she keeps secret from her new employers. She forms a platonic relationship with Mr. Amanjit and he is the only one to whom she reveals the existence of her daughter. Rachel later dies from an asthma attack.

=== Lotte Perlmutter ===
Portrayed by Alexia James. Lotte Perlmutter is the daughter of Rachel, and when her mother dies of an asthma attack, she is taken into the Holland household as Sir Hallam's ward. After the death of her mother she elapses into selective mutism, and is taken to therapy by Maud, Lady Holland. When Sir Hallam goes to visit her he discovers his sister, Pamela in the same asylum. After she regains the use of her voice Lotte attends boarding school, and Mr. Amanjit is seen visiting her there.

== Others ==
=== George, Duke of Kent ===
George, Duke of Kent, Sir Hallam's friend. Played by Blake Ritson. He is frustrated by his lack of influence and worried about his brother Edward's Nazi sympathies. He often confides in Sir Hallam and asks for his advice. At the end of the first season, his brother abdicates and another brother becomes king as George VI.

=== Joachim von Ribbentrop ===
The German ambassador, Joachim von Ribbentrop, Lady Persephone's admirer. Played by Edward Baker-Duly.

=== Anthony Eden ===
Foreign Secretary Anthony Eden, Sir Hallam's boss, played by Anthony Calf.

=== Lord Halifax ===
Foreign Secretary from early 1938, replacing Eden, played by Ken Bones

=== Sir Oswald Mosley ===
Oswald Mosley, leader of the British Union of Fascists, played by George Asprey.

=== Casper Landry ===
A rich American whom Lady Agnes befriends and is attracted by. He was first present at a dinner held by the Hollands where he suggested an attraction. At a later date Lady Agnes agrees to model for Landry's products, much to the annoyance of Sir Hallam. Played by Michael Landes.
