= Ami Metcalf =

English actress (born 1994)

- Born: Ami Louise Metcalf; June 1994 (age 32); Lewisham, London, England
- Occupation: Actress
- Years active: 2004–present
- Known for: Doctors; Upstairs Downstairs; The Mimic; Sister Boniface Mysteries

Ami Louise Metcalf (born June 1994) is an English actress. She rose to prominence in 2010 after portraying Sapphire Cox in the BBC soap opera Doctors, for which she won the Best Dramatic Performance from a Young Actor or Actress. Following Doctors, she has appeared in various projects including the BBC drama series Upstairs Downstairs, the Channel 4 sitcom The Mimic and the BBC Radio 4 series Home Front. Since 2022, she has appeared in the Britbox series Sister Boniface Mysteries as regular cast member Peggy Button.

== Life and career ==
Metcalf was born in June 1994 in Lewisham, London. She was raised there by her single mother who worked as a teaching assistant. In 2004, aged ten, Metcalf made her stage debut in a production of The Wind in the Willows at the Open Air Theatre, Barra Hall Park. In 2006, aged twelve, Metcalf made her screen debut in a voice role for two episodes of the children's series The Owl. Metcalf quit studying for her A-levels to focus on acting full-time.

In 2010, she was cast in the BBC medical soap opera Doctors as Sapphire Cox. Appearing in a recurring role for 15 episodes, she portrayed a teenager addicted to methadone who is taken in by established character Lily Hassan (Seeta Indrani). For her portrayal of Sapphire, Metcalf won the Best Dramatic Performance from a Young Actor or Actress at the 2010 British Soap Awards. Later in 2010, she portrayed a younger version of Kathy Burke in an episode of the Sky1 series Little Crackers. Impressed with her portrayal, producers cast Metcalf in a main role in a spin-off series for the programme, Walking and Talking, in 2012. Also in 2010, she starred in the BBC period drama Upstairs Downstairs as Eunice McCabe and appeared in the 2012 Christmas special of Call the Midwife.

From 2013 to 2014, she starred in the Channel 4 sitcom The Mimic as Helen Smith. Then in 2014, she began voicing Kitty Lumley in the BBC Radio 4 period drama series Home Front. She voiced Kitty until 2018, appearing on eleven series of the programme. Metcalf made her film debut in 2015 in the film Pan, playing Sister Thomas. In 2016, she appeared in two episodes of the BBC crime drama series Silent Witness as Lisa Wilson. In 2019, she returned to theatre, starring in a filmed production of Lady Windermere's Fan at the Vaudeville Theatre. A year later, she appeared in a National Theatre Live production of A Midsummer Night's Dream at the Bridge Theatre.

2019 also saw Metcalf appear in an episode of the BBC period series Father Brown as Alice Bonham. A year later, she appeared in the 2020 Christmas special of Birds of a Feather. Then, in 2022, Metcalf returned to the Father Brown fictional universe when she was cast in the main role of Peggy Button in its spin-off series, Sister Boniface Mysteries.

== Filmography ==
Year	Title	Role	Notes
2006	The Owl		Voice role
2009	Closer	Sarah	Short film
2010	Doctors	Sapphire Cox	Recurring role
2010	Little Crackers	Young Kathy	Episode: "Better Than Christmas"
2012	Upstairs Downstairs	Eunice McCabe	Main role
2012	One Night	Shannon	Recurring role
2012	Walking and Talking	Kath	Main role
2012	Bad Education	Poppy Hodgeson	Episode: "Politics"
2012	Call the Midwife	Lynette Duncan	Episode: "2012 Christmas special"
2012	Panto!	Chantelle Jenkins	Television film
2013	It's Kevin	Various	1 episode
2013	Listening to the Dead	Ruby Tully	Recurring role
2014	Catherine Tate's Nan	Alice	1 episode
2013–2014	The Mimic	Helen Smith	Main role
2014–2018	Home Front	Kitty Lumley (voice)	Main role
2015	Pan	Sister Thomas	Film
2016	Silent Witness	Lisa Wilson	2 episodes
2016	Allied	Roxie	Film
2018	Lady Windermere's Fan	Lady Agatha / Rosalie	Live production
2019	Father Brown	Alice Bonham	Episode: "The Sacrifice of Tantalus"
2019	Crawl	Lee	Film
2020	Birds of a Feather	Jordan	Episode: "2020 Christmas special"
2022–present	Sister Boniface Mysteries	Peggy Button	Main role

== Stage ==
Year	Title	Role	Venue	Ref.
2004	The Wind in the Willows	Squirrels and Robins	Open Air Theatre	
2018	Lady Windermere's Fan	Lady Agatha / Rosalie	Vaudeville Theatre	
2019	A Midsummer Night's Dream	Snout	Bridge Theatre	

== Awards and nominations ==
Year	Award	Category	Nominated work	Result	Ref.
2010	British Soap Awards	Best Dramatic Performance from a Young Actor or Actress	Doctors	Won	
