= Ellie Kendrick =

British actress (born 1990)

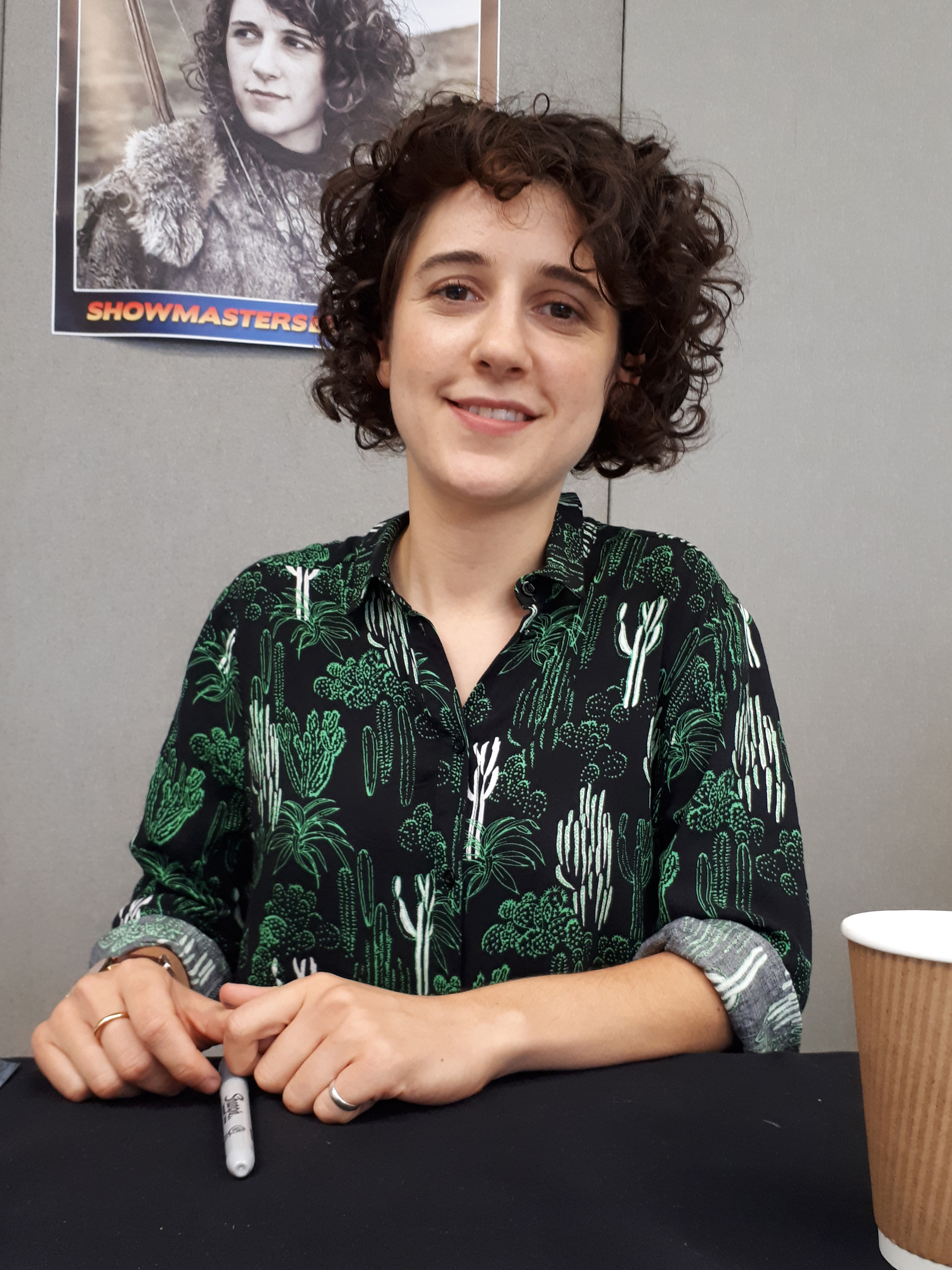
- Ellie Kendrick in 2018
- Born: Eleanor Lucy V. Kendrick; 6 June 1990 (age 36); Greenwich, London, England
- Education: Benenden School; University of Cambridge
- Occupations: Actress, stage performer
- Years active: 2004–present

Eleanor Lucy V. Kendrick (born 6 June 1990) is an English actress best known for playing Anne Frank in the BBC's 2009 miniseries The Diary of Anne Frank, Ivy Morris in the first series of the 2010 revived Upstairs Downstairs, and Meera Reed in the HBO series Game of Thrones. She also voices Taelia Fordragon in World of Warcraft: Battle for Azeroth.

== Early life ==
Kendrick was born in London. She attended Dulwich Prep Cranbrook in Cranbrook, Kent, followed by Benenden School, Kent, and spent Hazlitt Youth Theatre, Maidstone; Changeling Theatre, Kent; And the National Youth Theatre. She graduated from the University of Cambridge with a degree in English Literature.

== Career ==
Kendrick has played roles in Waking the Dead (2004), Doctors (2004), In 2 Minds (2004), Prime Suspect: The Final Act (2006), Lewis (2007), and the film An Education, scripted by Nick Hornby and which premièred at the 2009 Sundance Film Festival.

Kendrick played Anne Frank in the 2009 miniseries The Diary of Anne Frank. She said that her approach to playing Frank was to "peel back the layers of idolisation and to think of the characters just as normal people". Her performance was praised for "bringing fresh realism to an iconic role".

In 2009, she made her stage début as Juliet in a Shakespeare's Globe production of Romeo and Juliet. In December 2010, she played maid Ivy Morris in BBC One's revival of Upstairs Downstairs.

In 2011, Kendrick appeared in the BBC Radio 4 production of Life and Fate. She also played the character Allison in Being Human in 2012. She returned to the role in the ultimate episode of the series "The Last Broadcast" in 2013.

Between 2013 and 2014, and then 2016 and 2017, she played the recurring guest role of Meera Reed in the season 3 and season 4, and then season 6 and season 7 of the series Game of Thrones. In 2013 she returned to the stage in In the Republic of Happiness and The Low Road at the Royal Court Theatre; she appeared as Constance in an episode of Sky1's Chickens. Kendrick also played the part of Helen in the final season of Misfits.

2016 saw Kendrick perform her first lead film role in The Levelling.

Kendrick's first play, Hole, premiered at the Royal Court Theatre in 2018 under the direction of Helen Goalen and Abbi Greenland. The play combines Greek mythology and physics to explore female rage and oppression. She wrote the play in 2016 as part of a writing group with the Royal Court.

In 2020, she had a recurring role in the first season of the political drama Cobra.

== Personal life ==
Kendrick is a lesbian.

== Work ==
=== Film ===
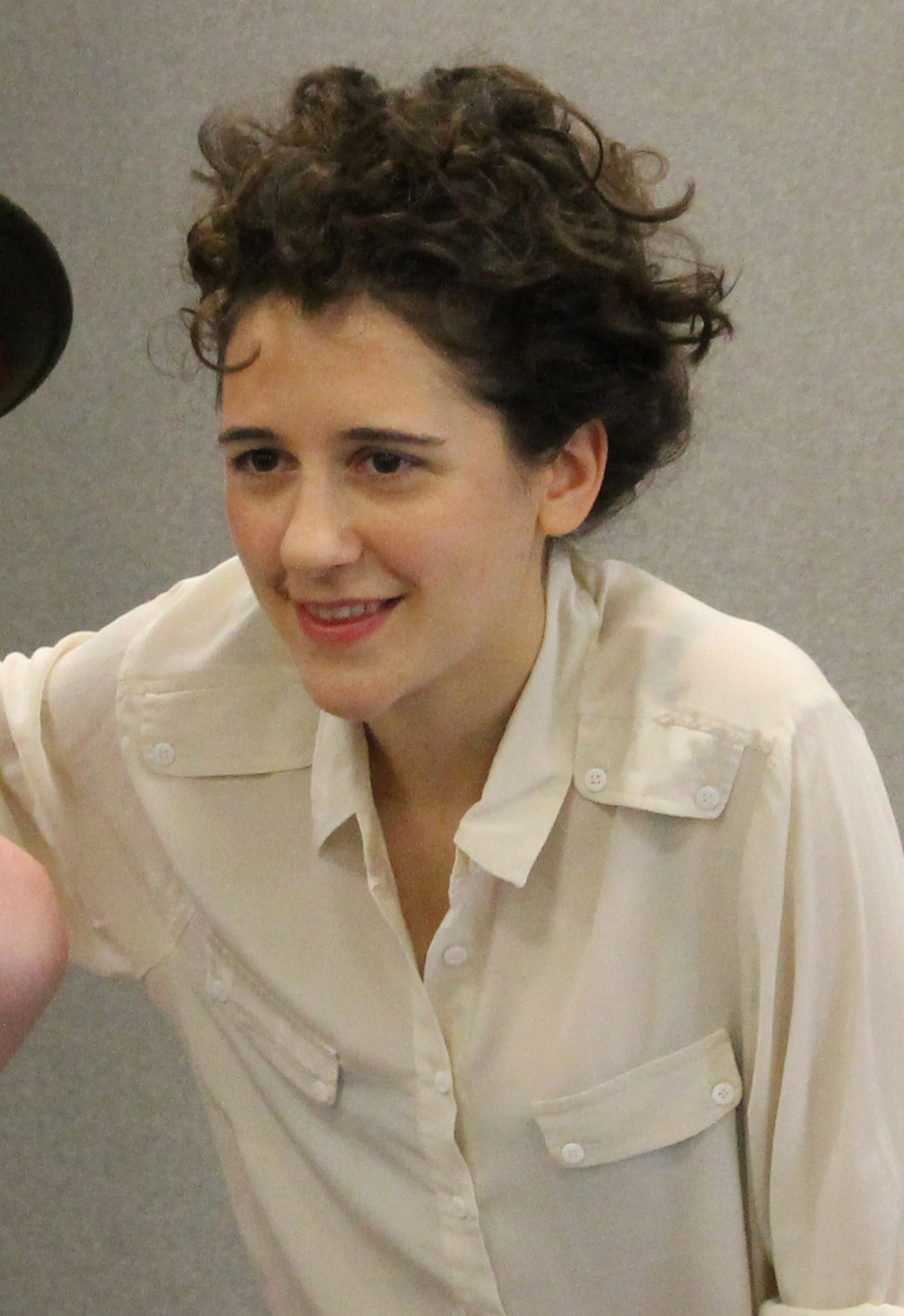
Kendrick in 2016

Year	Title	Role	Notes
2009	An Education	Tina	
2012	Cheerful Weather for the Wedding	Kitty Thatcham	
2016	Native	Eva	
2016	Love Is Thicker Than Water	Helen	
2016	Whisky Galore!	Catriona Macroon	
2016	The Levelling	Clover	
2022	Attachment	Leah	
2023	Bonus Track	Donna	

=== Television ===
Year	Title	Role	Notes
2004	Waking the Dead	Young Greta	Episode: "The Hardest Word, Part 2"
2004	Doctors	Laura	Episode: "Promises, Promises"
2004	In2Minds	Zoe	Main cast
2006	Prime Suspect: The Final Act	Melanie	
2007	Lewis	Megan Linn	Episode: "Whom the Gods Would Destroy"
2009	The Diary of Anne Frank	Anne Frank	Limited-run series, title role Nominated—Satellite Award for Best Actress – Miniseries or Television Film
2010	Upstairs Downstairs	Ivy Morris	Main cast (Series 1)
2012, 2013	Being Human	Allison	2 episodes
2013–2014, 2016–2017	Game of Thrones	Meera Reed	Recurring role (Seasons 3–4, 6–7)
2013	Chickens	Constance	Episode: "Four"
2013	Misfits	Helen	Recurring role (Series 5)
2018	Press	Leona Manning-Lynd	Main cast
2018	Vanity Fair	Jane Osborne	Recurring role
2020	McDonald & Dodds	Elenora Crockett	Episode: "The Fall of the House of Crockett" (series briefly known as Invisible)
2020	COBRA	Stephanie Lodge	Recurring role (Series 1)
2021	Dodo	Lilly Scott	Recurring role (voice role)

=== Video games ===
Year	Title	Role	Notes
2018	World of Warcraft: Battle for Azeroth	Taelia Fordragon	
2020	World of Warcraft: Shadowlands	Taelia Fordragon	
2023	Xenoblade Chronicles 3: Future Redeemed	Na'el	
2025	Civilization VII	Ada Lovelace	

=== Radio ===
Year	Title	Station
2011	Life and fate	BBC Radio Four
2012	Dracula	BBC Radio Four
2014	The Basin	BBC Radio Four
2017	Agnes Grey	BBC Radio Four

=== Theatre ===
Year	Title	Director	Role	Theatre
2017	Gloria	Michael Longhurst	Ani, Sasha, Callie	Hampstead Theatre
2009	Romeo and Juliet	Dominic Dromgoole	Juliet	Shakespeare's Globe Theatre
2014	Pests	Vivienne Franzmann	Rolly	Royal Court Theatre (commissioned by Clean Break)
