= Barra Hall Park =

Park in the London Borough of Hillingdon, UK

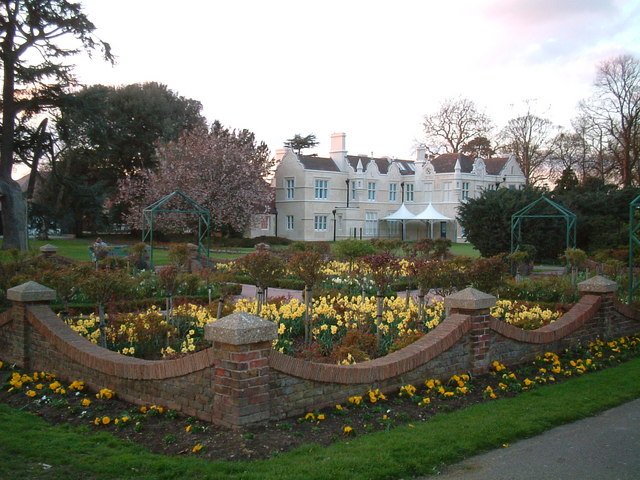
- Barra Hall, Hayes
- Interactive map of Barra Hall Park
- Type: Public park
- Location: Hayes, Hillingdon, Greater London
- Coordinates: 51°31′04″N 0°25′24″W
- Created: 1923
- Operator: London Borough of Hillingdon
- Status: Open year round
- Parking: On-site lot

Barra Hall Park is an 11.06-hectare (27.3-acre) formal park situated near the centre of Hayes in the ward of Wood End in the London Borough of Hillingdon. The park came into existence in December 1923.

The main entrance to the park is off Freemans Lane. There are ten entrances all together, spread around the perimeter of the park.

== History ==
Barra Hall Park came into existence on 20 December 1923 when the then Urban District Council (UDC) of Hayes bought the Hall and its grounds from Ms Ethel Penfold for £5,700 in order to use it as a town hall. Later alterations by the UDC brought the total to £7,000. The Barra Hall building was officially opened as town hall on 23 February 1924 and its grounds became a municipal park with playground, tennis courts and a paddling pool opened by music hall star Jessie Matthews. In 1965, Hayes UDC was integrated into the London Borough of Hillingdon (LBH) and the hall was eventually supplanted by the new Civic Centre in Uxbridge as main council office.

The Barra Hall building was originally a manor house, formerly known as Grove House. In the late eighteenth century it was home to Alderman Harvey Combe, elected Lord Mayor of London in 1799. It passed ownership and in 1871 was bought by Robert Reid. Reid was an auctioneer and surveyor and claimed to descend from the Reids of Barra. After enlarging and refacing the building he changed its name to Barra Hall in 1875. Army Cavalry were stationed here during World War I. On 6 October 2005, a renovated Barra Hall was opened as a Sure Start children's centre.

== Flora and fauna ==
Barra Hall Park features ornamental lawns, recreational grass areas, rose and shrub beds, seasonal bedding and numerous mature trees.

== Facilities and features ==
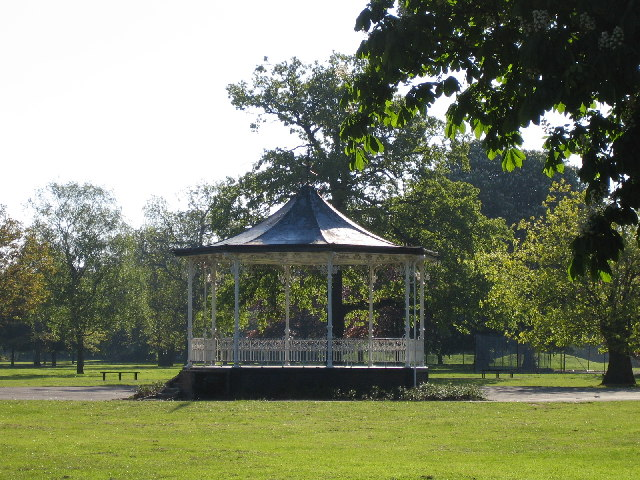
The bandstand in Barra Hall Park

The main building within the grounds is a grade-two listed manor house, which was at one time the town hall for Hayes and Harlington.

There is also Barra Hall Open Air Theatre, a bandstand, a refreshment kiosk and a children's play area.

== Art and culture ==
- Hayes town's annual carnival, a major feature of local life since the 1950s, culminates in a fête and funfair on an appointed weekend each July at Barra Hall Park.
- Barra Hall Open Air Theatre is a community venue for music, theatre and dance.
- On Sunday 5 August 2012, Jeremy Deller's art installation Sacrilege (an inflatable life-size model of Stonehenge) was installed in the park from 10.30am to 6pm. An estimated 1,400 people visited on the day.
- The park features a tree sculpture titled "Man looking for his dog" by Tom "Carver" Harvey.
- Parts of Bend It Like Beckham were filmed in the park.
- Parts of Chocolat were filmed in the Barra Hall building.

== Transport ==
=== Buses ===
The 195 and H98 stop near Barra Hall Park on Church Road, and the U4 stops near the park at Barra Hall Circus. Hayes town centre is approximately 1 km away, with its many other regular bus services.

=== Train ===
The closest railway station is Hayes and Harlington, which is a little over 1 km walk away.

=== Car ===
On-site parking is available. Street parking (Park and Pay) may be found on the surrounding roads near to the entrances.
