= The Mimic (TV series) =

- Genre: Comedy
- Written by: Matt Morgan
- Directed by: Kieron Hawkes
- Starring: Terry Mynott; Neil Maskell; Jo Hartley; Ami Metcalf; Daniel John Dodd; Siobhan Haran; Jacob Anderson
- Country of origin: United Kingdom
- Original language: English
- No. of series: 2
- No. of episodes: 11

Production
- Producer: Jack Bayles
- Running time: 25 minutes
- Production company: Running Bare Pictures

Original release
- Network: Channel 4
- Release: 13 March 2013 – 20 August 2014

The Mimic is a British television series that aired on Channel 4 for two seasons in 2013 and 2014. The series centres on the fortunes of Martin Hurdle, an everyday maintenance man with an uncanny ability to mimic voices, and stars Terry Mynott in the lead role.

== Cast ==
- Terry Mynott as Martin Hurdle
- Neil Maskell as Neil
- Jo Hartley as Jean
- Ami Metcalf as Helen Smith
- Jacob Anderson as Steve Coombes
- Sharon Duncan-Brewster as Dionne Coombes
