= Sister Boniface Mysteries =

British Detective TV series

- Genre: Cosy; Mystery; Crime; Comedy drama; Period drama
- Created by: Jude Tindall
- Starring: Lorna Watson; Max Brown; Jerry Iwu; Miranda Raison; Ami Metcalf
- Composer: Michael Price
- Country of origin: United Kingdom
- Original language: English
- No. of series: 4
- No. of episodes: 38

Production
- Executive producers: Stephen Nye; Will Trotter; Emily Powers; Jonathan Karas; Neil Irvine
- Producers: Peter Bullock; Loretta Preece
- Running time: 45 minutes. Two 90 minute specials.
- Production companies: BBC Studios; BritBox

Original release
- Network: BritBox
- Release: 8 February 2022 – present

Related
- Father Brown

Sister Boniface Mysteries is a British cosy mystery detective period comedy drama television series, created by Jude Tindall, which is produced by BBC Studios and BritBox. It is a spin-off of Father Brown, as the Sister Boniface character was introduced in "The Bride of Christ", a 2013 episode of Father Brown. A 10-episode first series premiered on 8 February 2022, on the BritBox streaming service, and was released in the UK on the UKTV Drama channel later in 2022. Sister Boniface Mysteries was commissioned for a second series, which began streaming in the US on Britbox on 3 April 2023. Series 3 began streaming on Britbox in the US on 24 April 2024. Filming on series 4 began in July 2024. Show creator Tindall died shortly after filming of series 4 began. Series 4 began streaming in the US on Britbox on 19 August 2025 and began on U&Drama in the UK on 26 September 2025, at 9pm.

== Premise ==
The series is set in England during the early 1960s. Sister Boniface is a Catholic nun at St. Vincent's Convent set in the fictional town of Great Slaughter in the Cotswolds (which were used as locations in Father Brown). In addition to her religious duties at the convent, she makes wine and has a PhD in forensic science, allowing her to serve as a scientific adviser to the local police on investigations. However, in the Father Brown episode "The Forensic Nun", the degree is referred to as an MA (Cantab).

The three regularly featured police officers are Detective Inspector Sam Gillespie (revealed in Series 1 episode 9 to be a former army officer), Detective Sergeant Felix Livingstone (on secondment from the police force of Bermuda) and Woman Police Constable (WPC) Peggy Button.

== Cast ==
- Lorna Watson as Sister Boniface, (née Bonham-Crane), a Catholic nun
- Max Brown as Sam Gillespie, a Detective Inspector
- Jerry Iwu as Felix Livingstone, a Detective Sergeant on secondment from Bermuda
- Miranda Raison as Ruth Penny, a newspaper reporter (Series 1, guest series 2, 3 and 4)
- Ami Metcalf as Peggy Button, a Constable (WPC)

=== Supporting cast ===
- Belinda Lang as Mrs. Clam
- Carolyn Pickles as Reverend Mother Adrian
- Virginia Fiol as Sister Reginald
- Tina Chiang as Sister Peter
- David Sterne as Tom Thomas
- Ivan Kaye as Ted Button
- Sarah Crowden as Miss Thimble
- Robert Daws as Chief Constable Hector Lowsley
- Mat Fraser as Clement Rugg, reporter
- Jack Gouldbourne as Norman Whalley, junior reporter, classmate of Peggy Button
- Ayesha Griffiths as Victoria Braithwaite, fiancée of Felix Livingstone

=== Guest cast ===
- Mark Williams as Father Brown
- Sylvestra Le Touzel as Prunella Gladwell
- John Thomson as Leonard Monk
- Maggie Steed as Vivienne Bonham-Crane, Sister Boniface's mother
- Geoff McGivern as Malise Bonham-Crane, Sister Boniface's father
- Patrick Robinson as Jacob Livingstone, Felix's father
- Crystal Yu as Jean Pettifer
- Les Dennis as Robbie Rowbotham
- Elaine C. Smith as Jeanie McIntyre, Mrs. Clam's sister

== Production ==
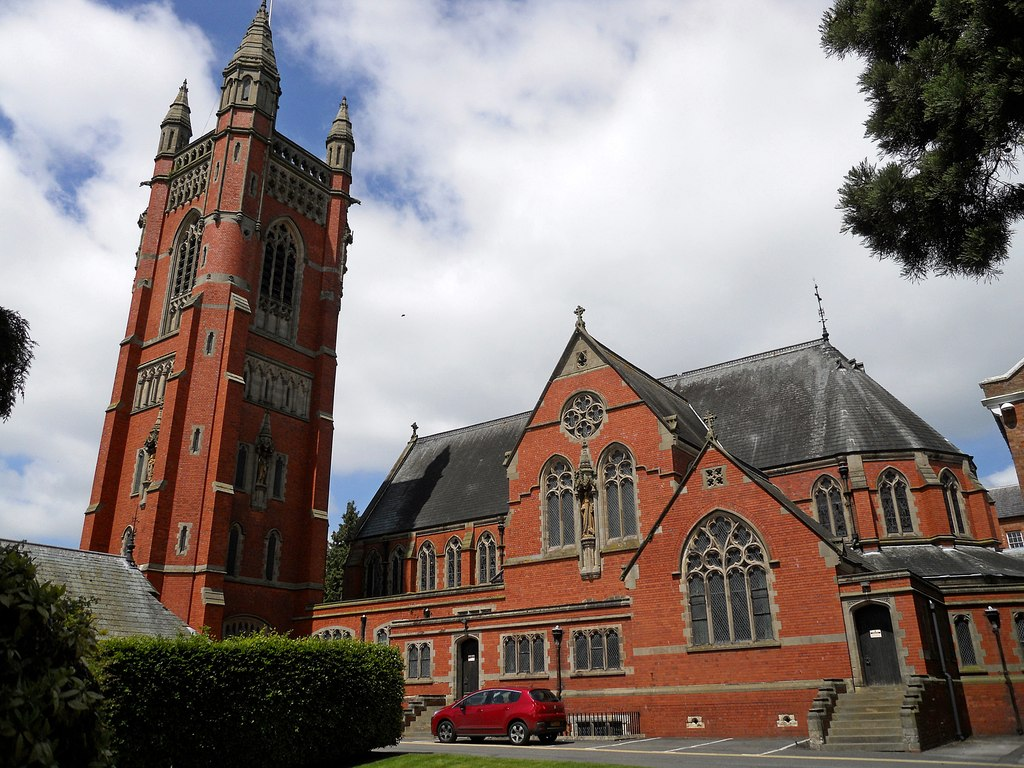
Princethorpe College in June 2013

=== Development ===
Father Brown executive producer Will Trotter anticipated developing a Sister Boniface spin-off as soon as Father Brown had ended. He eventually pitched the concept to Britbox. The two series share several writers and directors, such as John Maidens, Paul Gibson, Kit Lambert, Tahsin Güner, and Ian Barber.

=== Locations ===
The location for St Vincent's Convent is Princethorpe College, a Catholic independent day school in Princethorpe, near Rugby, Warwickshire, England.

The location for the town's village hall is in Great Barrington, Gloucestershire. This hall is used multiple times during Series 2.

The location of the hidden radio station in Series 2 Episode 8, "Dead Air", was at Donnington Brewery, which is also home to Mrs Devine's house in Father Brown.

The location of the Spitfire pub is the Bakers Arms in Broad Campden.

== Episodes ==
Series
| Series | Episodes | Originally released | |
| Series | Episodes | First released | Last released |
|---|---|---|---|
| 1 | 10 | 8 February 2022 | 8 March 2022 |
| 2 | 10 | 3 April 2023 | 29 April 2023 |
| Special | | 19 December 2023 | |
| 3 | 8 | 7 June 2024 | 26 July 2024 |
| Special | | 19 December 2024 | |
| 4 | 8 | 19 August 2025 | 7 October 2025 |

=== Series 1 (2022) ===
| No. overall | No. in series | Title | Directed by | Written by | Original release date |
|---|---|---|---|---|---|
| 1 | 1 | "Unnatural Causes" | Paul Gibson | Jude Tindall | 8 February 2022 |
Grace Pearson is found dead at a local festival. Detective Inspector Sam Gillespie, to the bewilderment of newly arrived Detective Sergeant Felix Livingstone, uses Sister Boniface as his scientific adviser. She determines that Pearson died by suffocation after her head was pushed into sawdust. The investigation leads to the three Bellamy siblings, at whose home Pearson was a housemaid. Their wealthy uncle died of an apparent heart attack at a dinner party six months earlier, leaving the siblings his large mansion and fortune. However, the discovery that Pearson wrote a letter to the local newspaper's agony aunt suggesting murder gives the police and Sister Boniface cause to revisit the circumstances of the uncle's death.
| 2 | 2 | "Lights, Camera, Murder!" | Merlyn Rice | Dominique Moloney | 8 February 2022 |
Top television spy series Operation QT is filming at the convent, and when a real bullet is fired narrowly missing the leading actor, Sister Boniface investigates. Together with DS Livingstone, Sister Boniface works out the real target was the show producer Dick Lansky, who has many enemies on and off set and a roving eye for the actresses. Lansky is found dead in a chair, electrocuted, and DI Gillespie takes charge. With help from reporter Ruth Penny, Gillespie is directed towards one of the actresses who had fled from Lansky's caravan. He also realises the bullet and electrocution reflected scenes from the episode being filmed and the last scene features a briefcase containing a bomb. Sister Boniface, who had rudimentary training in bomb disposal when she worked at wartime Bletchley Park, lends a hand.
| 3 | 3 | "Love and Other Puzzles" | Ian Barber | Kitty Percy | 15 February 2022 |
Sister Boniface is called to examine the body of Hilary Sympson-Smythe, who has died mysteriously, her face covered in cold cream and a completed jigsaw with one piece missing. A lonely hearts connection to Ruth Penny's newspaper leads Gillespie and Livingstone to investigate the male respondents. Ruth believes there is another victim who died in identical circumstances. A third victim is murdered with the only clue some mud from a shoe. Narrowing the suspects to three men and then to one, but with no evidence, Gillespie and Livingstone need a potential victim to attract the killer. Their landlady Mrs Clam volunteers. Looking for the mud's location, Sister Boniface and WPC Button realise the detectives have gone after the wrong man, and Ruth Penny is in danger when she discovers the missing jigsaw pieces.
| 4 | 4 | "My Brother's Keeper" | John Maidens | Kit Lambert | 15 February 2022 |
Sister Reginald's incorrigible brother Alfie Lynch, a habitual thief, turns up at the nunnery seeking help. He is put up at Mrs Clams's guest house. At an art exhibition in the local gallery, egocentric artist Gerry Ardwell features himself as the main exhibit. The next morning Ardwell is found dead, bludgeoned by a brass statue, and a valuable painting stolen. Alfie Lynch is missing and DI Gillespie's main suspect. Sister Reginald pleads with Sister Boniface to find the real culprit, a task made harder when the painting is found in Lynch's room and other suspects have alibis. Features cameo by Mark Williams as Father Brown
| 5 | 5 | "Scoop!" | John Maidens | Dan Muirden | 22 February 2022 |
Sister Boniface is called by DI Gillespie to the home of minister of defence, Charles Streatham, where guest Mary Sparkes was found dead at the bottom of a staircase. Quickly assessing Sparkes has been murdered by poisoning, Gillespie and DS Livingstone have to identify the murderer among the persons in the house: one is reporter Ruth Penny, disguised as a maid and looking for a scoop. Others in the house are Streatham's wife and guests actress Jocelyn Kelly and her husband screenwriter Anthony Kelly. Also present is Professor Azim Thomas, Chief Scientific Advisor to the Ministry of Defence, for whom Sparkes was secretary. Sister Boniface discovers a sophisticated binary poison was used while Ruth uncovers an affair between Streatham and Sparkes. A missing secret document concerning Britain's next generation of nuclear missiles points to KGB involvement.
| 6 | 6 | "Song for the Dead" | John Maidens | Oliver Frampton | 22 February 2022 |
Reggie Wallis, lead singer for the pop group The Queenmakers, is found dead from an allergic reaction to a bee sting, confirmed by Sister Boniface as murder when she finds the dead bee and Wallis' shirt collar smeared with glue and pollen. Gillespie and Livingstone investigate the rivalries among the band, their conniving manager and Wallis' pregnant secret wife, who he was planning to divorce. Ruth Penny finds another motive in a roadie who had committed suicide exactly two years earlier. Sister Boniface concentrates on pollen combinations found on the dead bee to locate the garden the bee had come from. WPC Peggy Button, who had a crush on Wallis, finds her police career in jeopardy.
| 7 | 7 | "Dem Bones" | Ian Barber | Michelle Lipton | 1 March 2022 |
A skeleton found buried in Edie Paignton's allotment is difficult for Sister Boniface to identify as male or female. Paignton's husband had disappeared, as had Frank Harsden's pregnant daughter Jenny. More tests by Sister Boniface reveal the victim had been murdered with a cultivator and buried in a caustic soda mixture. She finally identifies the body as Sidney Jackson, who owned the allotments and who disappeared the day before selling them to a supermarket chain. DI Gillespie arrests Peggy Button's father after discovering the murder weapon in his allotment shed and his use of caustic soda in his butcher's shop. DS Livingstone discovers that Frank Harsden was physically abusing his daughter Jenny and that Jackson was the father of her child.
| 8 | 8 | "Queen of the Kitchen" | Merlyn Rice | Tahsin Güner | 1 March 2022 |
Prunella Gladwell comes to St Vincent's Convent to present an episode of her top rated cookery show involving six contestants, including Sister Boniface, competing for a cash prize. Contestant Gladys Tibbs dies during the recording, and Sister Boniface determines she was poisoned by belladonna berries added to her own cake – a cake that should have been tasted by Gladwell. Sam and Felix uncover animosity among the contestants, television crew and Gladwell's husband. Sister Boniface discovers Reverend Mother's favourite carp, Colin, dead in the convent pond near a growing belladonna plant and a fragment of paper containing part of a recipe. The recording delayed, Sam and Sister Boniface have to prevent another murder while the show is broadcast live.
| 9 | 9 | "Sister Town" | Dominic Keavey | Oliver Frampton | 8 March 2022 |
Great Slaughter's twinning with a German town is met with animosity by some members of the twinning committee and townsfolk. Karl Fischer, the German mayor, with his wife Elsa and a group of German soldiers led by General Udo Von Stark arrive for the ceremony. An attempt on Fischer's life kills Ellis Everett, who was opposed to the twinning. Sister Boniface discovers a handkerchief soaked with sweat and smelling of acetone, indicating diabetes. General Stark tells Sam and Felix that Karl insisted on twinning with Great Slaughter. Mayor and committee member Iris Heartley met and fell in love with Karl when she was a nurse in the POW camp where he was confined after being shot down in the war. Karl admits participating in the bombing of Coventry, something of which he is now ashamed. Diabetes tests conducted on all the suspects are negative, but Peggy Button's mentioning that her vitamin C tablets were stolen gives Sister Boniface a key clue. Ruth Penny discovers Sam and Karl Fischer have much in common.
| 10 | 10 | "Crimes and Miss Demeanours" | Dominic Keavey | Jude Tindall | 8 March 2022 |
The United Britain beauty contest comes to Slaughter Abbey, and one of the three favourites is found dead in the swimming pool. Sister Boniface deduces murder from a blow to the back of the head. To the annoyance of Sam, Detective Chief Inspector Winner is sent from Scotland Yard to oversee the investigation, but Felix sees this as his chance to transfer to Scotland Yard. The investigation reveals the victim was disliked by her fellow contestants, whom she looked to have disqualified for breaking contest rules. Sister Boniface determines the victim was murdered by a stiletto heel. Winner and Felix arrest Miss Glasgow, who won her title by default when the winner was disqualified, after her sash is found near the pool with the victim's blood on it, even though it was not there when WPC Peggy Button searched the area. Sam and Sister Boniface look for the owner of the stiletto, and a burnt birthday card confirms a motive for murder.

=== Series 2 (2023) ===
Series 2 began streaming in the US on 3 April 2023.

| No. overall | No. in series | Title | Directed by | Written by | Original release date |
|---|---|---|---|---|---|
| 11 | 1 | "Don't Try This at Home" | Ian Barber | Jude Tindall | 3 April 2023 |
The children's TV show Jolly Roger comes to Great Slaughter to record a roadshow episode. The programme editor, Dinah Morgan, returns from three months' jury service and is not happy with producer Fliss Forsyth and the direction the show has taken. When Morgan is found murdered, Forsyth and the show's three presenters, ex soldier Jono Hardy, ventriloquist Danny Lemon, and former circus performer Sandy Shanks become Sam's main suspects and he needs Sister Boniface to find evidence. She discovers a button and some human hair and a witness to the murder, but it is Poopdeck Pete, the show's parrot who has escaped his cage following, determined by Sister Boniface, an attempt on his life.
| 12 | 2 | "The Shadow of Baron Battenberg" | John Maidens | Dominique Maloney | 3 April 2023 |
Sam and Ruth pretend to be married, having a strained relationship, in order to go undercover at a couples' retreat. The retreat is run by Marion Grey and Edwin Battenberg. Marion was married to Edwin's brother, Baron Battenberg, a philanderer, who disappeared 5 years ago, but sightings of him interest a Times journalist, Victor Goodbody, who believes he was murdered. Sam and Ruth, maintaining their cover, seek clues to the whereabouts of the Baron and discover Goodbody dead. Sister Boniface discovers he had been drugged with LSD before being murdered and Sam finds a tooth belonging to Goodbody in a pool. This brings another couple, Ben and Leigh Matthews, under suspicion. Leigh was a beauty contestant winner and Goodbody has written a story about how she won the contest, to the disgust of her jealous husband. Sister Boniface's meal at the retreat is laced with LSD but it gives her insight as to the killer. Sam and Ruth's relationship has developed at the clinic until she reveals a job offer from The Times to replace Goodbody.
| 13 | 3 | "The It Girl" | Ian Barber | Neil Irvine | 11 April 2023 |
Super model Robin "Birdie" Carter returns reluctantly to her native Great Slaughter ordered by her domineering manager Max Savage. Also in tow are Moses Valentine, the uncredited designer of "Birdies" fashion range, and documentary film maker, Verity Martin with her own agenda to vilify Carter and Savage. They are all staying at Slaughter Manor and in the night Savage is murdered in his locked room. Sister Boniface discovers Carter's blood on the wall, a cigar in the hearth, and partly destroyed film footage. Peggy Button, an old friend of Carter's, is more interested in why she is estranged from her mother Shirley Turner whose second husband, Carter's step-father, had died after she left the village to find fame and fortune.
| 14 | 4 | "The Book of Shadows" | Judith Dine | Dan Muirden | 11 April 2023 |
Tom Thomas comes across a coven of white witches in the woods. In the morning the charred remains of a woman are found within a pentagram symbol. Sister Boniface informs Sam the woman has been stabbed in the neck and among the ashes she finds a ritual dagger and a pentacle inscribed Jackie Rice; one of the members of the coven. The news come to the attention of Reverend Mother Adrian who had previous dealings with the witches she believed had been banished from Great Slaughter when she burnt their book, The Book of Shadows. Sam has the task of uncovering the identities of the witches who live undetected in the village as the suspects to the murder. More importantly Sister Boniface discovers a black witch has infiltrated the coven and the Reverend Mother is to be the next victim.
| 15 | 5 | "St George's Defence" | Merlyn Rice | Kit Lambert | 18 April 2023 |
Sister Boniface's parents, atheists who were aghast when their daughter took religious vows, come to Great Slaughter. Her mother, Vivienne, is concerned her husband, Malise, is obsessed that a Russian spy is one of the competitors at the British Open Chess Championships. Sister Boniface, much to her mother's annoyance, agrees that her father's suspicions should be investigated. Sam is not convinced but agrees Felix and Peggy can help Sister Boniface, who enters the competition. When a competitor is murdered, Max investigates and an encoded diary is found which contains information about a mind-enhancing drug and a clandestine meeting. After winning her rounds, Sister Boniface reaches the final and comes up against an opponent who has risen up the ranks of chess masters in the last year.
| 16 | 6 | "A Tight Squeeze" | Judith Dine | Ed Sellek | 18 April 2023 |
Filming of a bawdy comedy, Oh Do Behave Constable, in Great Slaughter lands Sister Boniface in hospital with a broken leg. Felix has been on set to advise on correct police procedure. When the director Sexton St. Juste is strangled with a brassiere, suspicion falls on four cast members who all have a motive. Sister Boniface enlists Sister Reginald and Sister Peter, without Reverend Mother Adrian's knowing, to find evidence at the crime scene while Sam and Felix look for the murder weapon. A running film camera at the murder scene pointing at a wall gives Sister Boniface a clue and Felix's discovery of an 8mm home movie entitled The Wedding, lands them with the murderer's motive.
| 17 | 7 | "Stiff Competition" | John Maidens | Jude Tindall | 22 April 2023 |
The fiftieth Great Slaughter Talent Contest with a £500 prize attracts a record entry. The two favourites are magician Tony Smith (the Great Faldini) and 11-year-old Tina Tiny, "the girl with the big voice." The head judge is Chief Constable Hector Lowsley. During the final heat Tony Smith is murdered during his Box of Death trick. Sister Boniface and Felix investigate as Sam absents himself. Smith, determined to win is uncovered as a blackmailer, and suspects include Smith's former partner fellow competitor Leonard Monk (Curly Cuddles), judge Jane Beaufort who was Debra Cadabra (Smith's assistant 10 years ago) and Sylvie Simmons, Tina Tiny's pushy mother. The discovery of a can of hairspray leads Sister Boniface to the murderer and the tragic death of a sister some years ago and the ensuing consequences.
| 18 | 8 | "Dead Air" | Paul Gibson | Oliver Frampton | 22 April 2023 |
Pirate radio station Radio Catherine is operating in the Great Slaughter area, and Peggy is one of its greatest fans. GPO inspector Nigel Graybone enlists Sam's rather reluctant help to track the station down. When lead disc jockey Billy King is murdered, Sister Boniface determines he was electrocuted by someone tampered with his microphone. Sam and Felix investigate King's associates, including technician Arnie Cunningham, who's in love with King's wife Cathy. She resents her husband's philandering. Also suspected are King's co-presenter ex-BBC Light Programme disc jockey Patt Garrett and businessman Gabriel Viegas, who is about to pump a lot of money into the station. Sister Boniface discovers a clue on the recording of King's final show but cannot identify it; then she and Peggy discover a connection between Cathy and Graybone in the local paper.
| 19 | 9 | "Stage Fright" | Paul Gibson | Kitty Percy | 29 April 2023 |
Chief Constable Hector Lowsley is actor, manager, director of the struggling Great Slaughter Amateur Dramatics Society known as G-SADS. The G-SADS are hoping to receive a grant to carry on their work and are performing a play by local author Ambrose Chance, now deceased. When the leading man, Lewis Garner, is murdered, stabbed on stage by a prop knife, Sister Boniface and Sam investigate. Lowsley enlists Felix as a replacement actor. Sister Boniface investigates the significance of the stage backdrop of an actual location, and she and Sam discover the body of a man murdered years ago, that was witnessed by Garner when he was a boy. They come to realise the play is actually a confession of the murder by two men; Chance and another still alive. The Chief Constable insists the show must go on.
| 20 | 10 | "The Good Samaritan" | Merlyn Rice | Jude Tindall | 29 April 2023 |
A copycat poisoning of Irene Symonds brings into doubt evidence against Myrtle Hunnisweet, aka The Good Samaritan, gathered by Sister Boniface and Max. Instead of prison Hunnisweet, a fan of Agatha Christie, was declared insane and sent to a psychiatric hospital. Another poisoning, of Saul Cropper, leads to Sam's suspension. Suspects include Symonds's husband who knew of his wife's many extra marital affairs, psychiatric nurse Brenda Bristow needing money and sole beneficiary of her grandfather Saul Cropper, and author Oswald Blower who is writing a book to prove Hunnisweet's innocence. Sister Boniface is convinced Hunnisweet is communicating by code with the copycat killer. A painting and hospital magazine in Hunnisweet's room provide a clue and forewarning to Sister Boniface of an attempt to poison Sam and then probably herself.

=== Christmas special (2023) ===
| No. overall | Title | Directed by | Written by | Original release date |
|---|---|---|---|---|
| 21 | "The Star of the Orient" | Ian Barber | Jude Tindall | 19 December 2023 |
Sister Boniface and Inspector Gillespie are on the same train going home for Christmas to their respective families when the train is caught in a snowstorm, and the last four carriages become detached. On board are the Usher family: father Sir Swinton, his son Ranulf, daughter-in-law Abigail, and his secretary Jean Smythe. Sir Swinton is conveying a valuable jewel he is donating to the British Museum. The jewel is believed to be cursed, already causing blindness to Abigail. When the jewel is stolen in what appears to be an impossible crime, Sam questions all the passengers while Sister Boniface remains incognito. An impossible murder of one of the passengers adds to the confusion. Back in Great Slaughter, Felix and Peggy have a problem of their own when a naked man is found frozen to death, and at St Vincent's convent, Reverend Mother Adrian has a fit of conscience and cancels Christmas, to the dismay of Sisters Reginald and Peter. A 16-year-old girl travelling alone and a black lad found hidden in the goods wagon with a donkey stable add to the Christmas theme and bring out the best in the Reverend Mother.

=== Series 3 (2024) ===
All episodes are available from streaming services.

| No. overall | No. in series | Title | Directed by | Written by | Original release date |
|---|---|---|---|---|---|
| 22 | 1 | "Never Too Deadly To Die" | Paul Gibson | Ed Sellek | 7 June 2024 |
Sister Boniface, Sam, and Felix rush to the home of author Lincoln Leigh Vasey on a false premise only to discover he is doing screen tests for an actor for his latest film in the faltering franchise of Agent Jonas Best. Three actors are testing; one of whom is Ruth Penny's new boyfriend Kingsley Markham. The other two being classically trained Campbell Kamen and non actor Benson Boyd. When Boyd is murdered by a deadly scorpion that Vasey kept in the house Sister Boniface and Sam investigate with Ruth's help. They discover Boyd had been blackmailing the three men and that actress Phoebe Vilante, the film's femme fatale, was pregnant by him. The presence of Ruth and her boyfriend is a distraction for Sam while Sister Boniface investigates the facts by making tests on various items in the process, uncovering a foreign spy. Felix's fiancée, Victoria Braithwaite, unexpectedly turns up.
| 23 | 2 | "House of Misfit Dolls" | Kodjo Tsakpo | Asher Pirie | 14 June 2024 |
The owner of Salem's Dolls, Arthur Salem, is found in a locked room stabbed in the back with a knife held in the hand of his newest doll, Harmony. The new doll threatened the livelihood of his four live-in employees, Merlin Crowe, doll designer; Octavia Hemlock, seamstress; and Gideon Glove, doll surgeon. They had all worked for Salem for the last twenty years, along with newcomer Beth Moody, who had worked at the shop for six months after receiving an unsigned invitation. More Harmony dolls turning up in various locations panic the town. Sam's investigation, Sister Boniface's forensic examination and the discovery of a human hair; the newer dolls have synthetic hair, gives motives to all four. An inspired thought by Peggy leads Sam and Felix to the first doll ever made, Eliza Rose, and the murderer. Victoria Braithwaite understands what Felix sees in Great Slaughter but does not change her ambitions for him.
| 24 | 3 | "Professor Y" | Paul Gibson | Neil Irvine | 21 June 2024 |
The inaugural convention of the cancelled science fiction TV show, "Professor Y," comes to Great Slaughter in an attempt to have the show recommissioned. Organised by fan president Roger Crabtree, Barbara Pierce, who has invested her inheritance, and fan Sister Peter to bring stars Kirk Fabricant, companion Celeste Carmichael, and writer Douglas Wiseman to the convention. Wiseman is particularly loathsome to the fans and is more interested in promoting his new show starring Celeste Carmichael. When a pool of blood and a mysterious green liquid is found in Wiseman's hotel room, Sam and Felix begin a search, while Sister Boniface looks for forensic clues that lead to a number of suspects and their troubled lives. Then Professor Y's main enemy, the metallic Zybok, goes missing, adding to the mystery. Norman Whalley is smitten with Peggy and Sister Peter receives a promotion.
| 25 | 4 | "A Fragrant Scandal" | Diana Patrick | Kate Traill | 28 June 2024 |
Thistleton Fine Fragrances, a struggling perfumery company run by Head Nose Sterling Thistleton and his sister Venetia hold a show to announce Sterling's retirement; a retirement he reneges on at the last minute. When the next day he is found dead stabbed by a poker suspicion falls on apprentice perfume makers Sarah-Mary Clam, Mrs Clam's niece, and Bramwell Bailey; one of whom was expected to be named as Head Nose. Sterling's nephew, Jupiter Thistleton-Thorn, a wastrel only interested in his allowance, is also a suspect. All three had a disagreement with Sterling the night before and a motive for murder. Evidence leads Max to arrest Jupiter and Sister Boniface initially agrees until the post mortem reveals he was poisoned and she realises Sterling had lost his sense of smell and taste. She discovers nail varnish leading to another conclusion.
| 26 | 5 | "How to Murder a Tune" | Diana Patrick | Lisa McMullin | 5 July 2024 |
The series finale of the TV show "Glory Be," featuring the Chorister of the Year final, is held at St Vincent's convent. When the musical director Donald Merriweather, a narcissist and bully, is poisoned by cyanide at the keyboard during rehearsals, Sister Boniface, Sam, and Felix investigate. A search of Merriweather's hotel room, the bridal suite, reveals an adjoining door to chorister Sylvia Melbury's room. Four suspects – presenter Barry Gold, director Marion Kane and rival choristers Sylvia Melbury and Oliver Potts – all have a motive. Sister Boniface has to find how the poison was administered, using the clues of French beeswax, threatening letters, and a partly destroyed cassette tape. Sister Peter is left in charge of the convent choir when Reverend Mother Adrian is indisposed, and she is shocked when Sisters Peter and Reginald take the nuns to the local pub to improve their performance.
| 27 | 6 | "It's Just Not Cricket" | Kodjo Tsakpo | Adam Hughes | 12 July 2024 |
The Great Slaughter Cricket Club, chairman Chief Constable Lowsley, is in financial trouble due to embezzlement of funds and nonpayment of rent. The survival of the club depends on winning the next match. When their star player Humphrey Lash is murdered with a cricket bat, suspicion falls on the key holders to the cricket club: Andrew Fitch, a player hoping to be discovered by cricket scouts; leaseholder Valerie Vandermeer, who wants to redevelop the land; Lindsay Calder-Marshall, coach; and his daughter Elsie. Sister Boniface concentrates on the forensic evidence, which includes a scrap of paper found in the victim's hand, while Sam looks at a magazine with a page torn out. Together they discover Lash was embezzling the funds, and Elsie was in love with him despite his arrogant behaviour to everyone at the club.
| 28 | 7 | "A Beautiful World" | Miranda Howard-Williams | Dan Muirden | 19 July 2024 |
Minerva Cosmetics salesgirls come to Great Slaughter, led by owner Jean Pettifer. Two of the salesgirls, Iris Gould and Mary Flint, are rivals in the village. Mary is one of the most successful salesgirls and Iris, abandoned as a child, struggles to keep her job. When Mary is poisoned at a sales party in her home, her husband Alfie, owner of the chemist shop, falls under suspicion. Sister Boniface discovers the poison, and Sam and Felix discover that Mary has a lot of cash and a list of her customers; some having a heart symbol against their name. Sam enlists Mrs Clam to help out undercover as a salesgirl. Tom Thomas begins acting amorously to all the woman, and Sister Boniface discovers Mary had been selling a banned aphrodisiac, supplied by Pettifer, and one of her customers died of heart attack. Sam is disappointed when Felix offers Best Man at his wedding to the Chief Constable.
| 29 | 8 | "Toast to the Newly Dead" | Miranda Howard-Williams | Oliver Frampton | 26 July 2024 |
Church cleaner Beryl Salt, who had a heart condition, is poisoned during Felix and Victoria's wedding rehearsal. Sister Boniface determines Salt was murdered by a dose of weed killer that would not have killed a healthy person. She also realises Victoria was the intended victim. Sister Boniface and Sam investigate the guests from Bermuda: Victoria's mother Morgana, her brother Gabriel, Felix's father Jacob, and bridesmaid Lilly Albright, Victoria's best friend and fellow nurse back in Bermuda. She also finds a piece of Bermudan beach sea glass coated with a slimy substance in the cupboard where the poison was found. Sam tells Felix that an anonymous caller had told the priest that the wedding was being cancelled. All the guests seem to have a reason to delay the wedding, reasons that lead Felix and Victoria to reconsider their feelings for each other.

=== Christmas special (2024) ===
| No. overall | Title | Directed by | Written by | Original release date |
|---|---|---|---|---|
| 30 | "Once Upon a Time" | Paul Gibson | Jude Tindall | 19 December 2024 |
The Great Slaughter Amateur Dramatic Society players are presenting Cinderella as their Christmas pantomime and appoint a well-known writer as director. His approach of making it avant-garde upsets many committee members who are also performing. A cat brings in a human eye, and Sister Boniface determines the possible owner, leading Sam and Felix to find a frozen body in nearby woods. When the GSADS chairman is stabbed to death, Sister Boniface, Sam, and Felix's investigation widens, despite Chief Constable Lowsley insisting the show must go on. At St Vincent's convent, Sister Reginald is instructed by Reverend Mother Adrian to fatten up Terry the Turkey for their Christmas dinner, but he mysteriously disappears, apparently taken by a fox. Sister Peter conducts her own investigation.

=== Series 4 (2025) ===
Series 4 was released on BritBox US on 19 August 2025, with weekly episodes continuing through until 7 October 2025.

| No. overall | No. in series | Title | Directed by | Written by | Original release date |
|---|---|---|---|---|---|
| 31 | 1 | "Biff! Pow! Zap!" | Ian Barber | Neil Irvine | 19 August 2025 |
| 32 | 2 | "A Murder of Crows" | Debbie Howard | Rosy Deacon | 26 August 2025 |
| 33 | 3 | "Are Ye’ Dancin’?" | Paul Riordan | Ciara Conway | 2 September 2025 |
| 35 | 4 | "Killer Heels" | Debbie Howard | Lisa McMullin | 9 September 2025 |
| 35 | 5 | "Let the Games Begin!" | Diana Patrick | Adam Hughes | 16 September 2025 |
| 36 | 6 | "There's No 'I' in Slaughter" | Paul Riordan | Asher Pirie | 23 September 2025 |
| 37 | 7 | "The Happiest Family" | Ian Barber | Dan Muirden | 30 September 2025 |
| 38 | 8 | "And Then There Were Nun" | Diana Patrick | Oliver Frampton | 7 October 2025 |

== Reception ==
Jim McDermott, in America, wrote: "It is a unique delight to watch a strong female character be not just tolerated but actively celebrated by the men with whom she works. It is also wonderful to see a detective show centered on a character so filled with hope." Commenting on Series 4, Felicity Martin of Good Housekeeping UK wrote: "[I]t's a lighthearted, cosy series with a charming lead in Lorna Watson. Whodunnit fans will love its clever mysteries, and it's set in the picturesque backdrop of the Cotswolds in the 1960s, giving it a retro spin."

== Home media ==
| Series | Release date | | | | Features |
| Series | Region 1 DVD | Region 2 DVD (UK) | Region B Blu-ray (UK) | Region 2 DVD (Germany) | Features |
|---|---|---|---|---|---|
| Series 1 | 13 September 2022 | 16 May 2022 | 16 May 2022 | 26 January 2024 | 10 episodes; 3 discs; BBFC rating: 12; FSK rating: 12 |
| Series 2 | 3 October 2023 | 31 July 2023 | 31 July 2023 | 25 April 2025 | 10 episodes; 3 discs; BBFC rating: 12; FSK rating: 12 |
| Series 3 | 13 August 2024 | 29 July 2024 | 29 July 2024 | 27 June 2025 | 9 episodes (incl. 2023 Christmas Special); 3 discs; BBFC rating: 12; FSK rating: 12 |
| Series 4 | 9 December 2025 | 20 October 2025 | 20 October 2025 | TBA | 9 episodes (incl. 2024 Christmas Special); 3 discs; BBFC rating: 12; FSK rating: TBA |
