= The Levelling =

2016 film by Hope Dickson Leach

- Film poster
- Directed by: Hope Dickson Leach
- Written by: Hope Dickson Leach
- Produced by: Rachel Robey
- Starring: Ellie Kendrick
- Cinematography: Nanu Segal
- Edited by: Tom Hemmings
- Music by: Hutch Demouilpied
- Production companies: Monterey Media iFeatures; Creative England; BBC Films; British Film Institute; Wellington Films
- Distributed by: Monterey Media
- Release dates: 10 September 2016 (TIFF); 7 October 2016 (UK)
- Running time: 83 minutes
- Country: United Kingdom
- Language: English

The Levelling is a 2016 British drama film written and directed by Hope Dickson Leach. It was screened in the Discovery section at the 2016 Toronto International Film Festival.

== Plot ==
Clover, now nearly finished her veterinary training, arrives back to the family farm on the Somerset Levels after her brother Harry commits suicide with a legally held shotgun at a party to celebrate the passing of title to the farm to him. Clover's father, Aubrey, is distracted, distant and uncommunicative. The farm and its buildings are dilapidated, as a result of the recent flooding of the levels. Aubrey is unable to accept Harry's death was suicide and protests that it must have been an accident.

Clover helps her father with the farm work, including milking their herd. While digging trenches with James, the farm labourer, they expose buried badger corpses. Clover is outraged and suspects Aubrey of being responsible. He tells her that it was Harry's doing, which disturbs Clover as she doesn't believe Harry could do such a thing. Aubrey explains that the farm is failing, insurance won't pay out for flood damage and that he is selling half the herd. One of the pregnant cows gives birth to a male calf and Aubrey tells the vegetarian Clover to cull it immediately, before the heifer gets attached to it. She finds it extremely difficult to do but kills the calf nonetheless.

Clover cleans the house and the mobile home, where she and father currently reside, and finds cans of petrol in the kitchen. Later on at night, Clover invites James over to talk and leads him into the kitchen while carrying a flaming torch but he stops her saying it's too dangerous with the petrol. They leave the room and James explains what happened at the party. Clover learns that Aubrey and Harry fought at the party after Harry got heavily intoxicated and attacked James. She comes to believe that her brother was under a lot of pressure from their father to take over the farm.

The next day Animal Health turns up with transport for the reactors in the herd. A stunned Clover then learns that TB was present in the cows, she then informs her father who also did not know about the TB. Later on Clover confronts Aubrey about what happened to Harry but he blames her for staying at the university when he needed her there. They argue until the enraged Aubrey orders her from the mobile home.

The morning of the funeral arrives and Aubrey has been drinking again, and he confirms, unbidden by Clover, that Harry asked him to call her and ask her to come back to help. But he told Harry to knuckle down and sort it out himself. Just as she is about to leave for the funeral Clover notices that the key to the gun cupboard is missing and fears that Aubrey is going to kill himself. She hears a gun shot across the farm and dashes out onto the muddy fields where she finds a distraught Aubrey methodically shooting his own herd. He tells Clover that she should return to university as there is nothing for her at the farm. Clover replies that he is and the two finally embrace with Aubrey collapsing in sobs to the ground.

== Cast ==
- Ellie Kendrick as Clover
- David Troughton as Aubrey
- Jack Holden as James
- Joe Blakemore as Harry
- Clare Burt as Reverend Trusler
- Angela Curran as Helen

== Reception ==
The film received positive reviews from critics. On review aggregator Rotten Tomatoes, the film holds a rating of 94%, based on 34 reviews, with an average rating of 7.5 out of 10. At Metacritic, which assigns a weighted average score out of 100 to reviews from mainstream critics, the film received an average score of 81 based on 8 reviews.
