= Shakespeare & Hathaway: Private Investigators =

British television series

- Genre: Comedy drama; Cosy mystery
- Created by: Jude Tindall; Paul Matthew Thompson
- Starring: Jo Joyner; Mark Benton; Patrick Walshe McBride; Tomos Eames; Aruhan Galieva
- Composer: Debbie Wiseman
- Country of origin: United Kingdom
- Original language: English
- No. of series: 6
- No. of episodes: 60

Production
- Executive producers: Will Trotter; Ceri Meyrick; Neil Irvine
- Producer: Ella Kelly
- Running time: 45 minutes
- Production company: BBC Studios

Original release
- Network: BBC One (2019–present); U&Alibi (2025–present)
- Release: 26 February 2018 – present

Shakespeare & Hathaway: Private Investigators is a British cosy mystery comedy-drama television series co-created by Jude Tindall and Paul Matthew Thompson and produced by BBC Birmingham. Set in Stratford-upon-Avon, the series concerns a private detective agency run by Luella Shakespeare (Jo Joyner) and Frank Hathaway (Mark Benton) with the assistance of aspiring actor Sebastian Brudenell (Patrick Walshe McBride).

The first four series, including a Christmas special, aired on BBC One from 26 February 2018 to 16 December 2022. The fifth series was released on U&Alibi on 24 September 2025; the filming of a sixth series set to air in 2026 was confirmed on 16 October 2025.

== Plot ==
Ex-detective inspector (DI) Frank Hathaway, now a debt-laden private investigator, meets Luella Shakespeare when she employs him to investigate the fiancé she met online. Hathaway and his assistant Sebastian Brudenell discover that the fiancé is a con man. They report back to Luella, but she is reassured by her fiancé, and the wedding goes ahead. When her new husband is killed at the reception, Luella is suspected of murder by local DI Christina Marlowe, who had been Frank's junior.

Luella is thrown together with Frank and Sebastian to crack the mystery of what has happened. After her name is cleared, she uses her recovered savings (and her late husband's estate) to buy into Frank's business; she effectively becomes Frank's partner in order to save him from the bailiffs. Their only employee, Sebastian Brudenell, is a young aspiring RADA-trained actor who uses his skills when undercover investigations are required. He lives above a theatre costumier run by Gloria Fonteyn.

== Cast ==
- Jo Joyner as Luella Shakespeare
- Mark Benton as Frank Hathaway
- Patrick Walshe McBride as Sebastian Brudenell
- Amber Agar as Detective Inspector Christina Marlowe (series 1–2)
- Tomos Eames as Detective Sergeant Joseph Keeler
- Roberta Taylor as Gloria Fonteyn (series 1–3)
- Yasmin Kaur Barn as Police Constable Viola Deacon (series 3–4)
- Aruhan Galieva as Bea Gardiner (series 6)

== Episodes ==
=== Series overview ===
Series	Episodes	Originally released		
Series	Episodes	First released	Last released	Network
1	10	26 February 2018	9 March 2018	BBC One
2	10	25 February 2019	8 March 2019	BBC One
3	10	3 February 2020	14 February 2020	BBC One
4	10	14 February 2022	16 December 2022	BBC One
5	10	24 September 2025	26 November 2025	U&Alibi
6	10	23 September 2026	25 November 2026	U&Alibi

=== Series 1 (2018) ===
No. overall	No. in series	Title	Directed by	Written by	Original release date
1	1	"O Brave New World"	Piotr Szkopiak	Paul Matthew Thompson and Jude Tindall	26 February 2018
Three days before her wedding, Luella Shakespeare hires private detective Frank Hathaway to investigate her fiancé, Clive Brenton, whom she believes is having an affair with his secretary, Janice Bardolph. She calls him off the case when she realises that she was mistaken. Frank had not found evidence of an affair, but found out that Clive is using different identities on dating websites. Frank interrupts the wedding, but Luella has the security guards send him away. Shortly after the wedding at a hotel, Clive is stabbed to death with Luella's hairdresser's scissors. Luella is arrested by the police, who release her soon after. She discovers that her savings have been stolen from her bank account. Hathaway and Shakespeare find out that Clive was a bigamist with an accomplice, Janice—who stole Luella's £250,000 that Luella had invested in Clive's company. Luella stops the accomplice from leaving with the money and retrieves it from her. Frank thinks that Janice is the killer, but the police state that Janice could not have killed Clive, although they arrest her for her involvement in Clive's bogus business. The investigation returns to the hotel and one of Clive's previous wives, Veronica Vinten—who admits that she killed Clive after finding out that he had faked his death and was marrying Luella. The police arrest Veronica. Frank, deep in debt, reluctantly accepts Luella as his partner in his detective agency. Guest star: Nigel Whitmey (Nigel Whitney in credits).
2	2	"The Chimes at Midnight"	Ian Barber	David Semple	27 February 2018
Frank and Luella are employed by Penelope Pincott to investigate sabotage at the business she and her husband Owain run, Shady Nooks care home. Sebastian goes undercover as a care assistant. During lunch, when all the staff and residents are in the dining room, Penelope falls to her death from the roof. Suspecting one of the staff or residents of the murder, Frank and Luella have to work out how it was done. Sebastian discovers that the saboteur is a resident, Johnny Falstaff. He does not like living there and was deliberately causing various problems in an attempt to have his son 'rescue' him from the home. Care worker Soozie is also a murder suspect when the investigation reveals that she is attracted to Owain. Frank works out how Penelope's (already dead) body crashed to the ground from the roof when all the home's residents and staff were present in the dining room. The death of a resident exactly a year ago provides a clue—the late resident's son Ian blames Penelope for the death. At the end, it is revealed that he became the home's cook six months later and killed Penelope in revenge on the anniversary of his mother's death. Guest star: Timothy West
3	3	"This Promised End"	Carolina Giammetta	Lol Fletcher	28 February 2018
Frank and Luella are employed by a funeral director, Peter Quintus, after he is visited by "Mr R" and "Mr G" who say that a criminal organisation has hired them to kill him in 24 hours' time. He is told not to involve the police or there will be consequences for his family, and there are two attacks on his wife, Anne. After one of the attacks, Frank finds a photograph relating to an art college that Anne attends. Luella interviews the neighbourhood warden, Melvin Pipkin, who is fond of Anne, and who is later found dead following a hit and run. Sebastian interviews Peter's man-eating ex-wife, who had been cheated out of money in her divorce settlement. It is discovered that Peter was violent towards both his wives and that Anne has persuaded two teachers at her college to pretend to be Mr R and Mr G to scare him. Melvin was killed by Peter, and the police arrest him. Anne leaves with Mr R, with whom she is in a relationship.
4	4	"This Rough Magic"	Carolina Giammetta	Kit Lambert	1 March 2018
Frank and Luella are employed by magician Lawrence Pross and his daughter Maggie after his iron maiden trick kills a woman, wealthy Jill Shiplake, on stage. The Prosses believe rival magician Anton Dukes is responsible. The victim was bickering with her husband that night and with the theatre usher. Frank realises the victim might not have been selected at random and suspects the husband, Stefan. They find evidence of Stefan's guilt but then realise Stefan and his wife had swapped theatre seats.
5	5	"Toil and Trouble"	Piotr Szkopiak	Kit Lambert	2 March 2018
The mayor of Arden is found murdered with a blunt object after firing a shotgun, and Detective Inspector Marlowe's prime suspect is burglar William 'Billy the Brick' Porter, a former informant of Frank's. Billy turns up at the S&H office, begging Frank, who is indebted to him, and Luella to prove his innocence. Their investigations lead to the press reporter who found the body, the deputy mayor, a property developer of ancient woods, and protesters against the development. Sebastian discovers Billy has a blood-stained T-shirt.
6	6	"Exit, Pursued by a Bear"	Ian Barber	Jeff Povey	5 March 2018
Frank and Luella are employed by narcissistic former hospital soap star Sally Balthasar. Sally has received a death threat after planning her comeback by rewriting Shakespeare's play Romeo and Juliet and playing the female lead. She calls her version Juliet and Romeo, and her character does not die. Her changes to a classic play offend cast members, the director, the backstage crew, and Shakespeare fans. Things come to a head when Sally is poisoned and unable to continue. The director then reverts to Shakespeare's original play. Frank and Luella watch old episodes of Sally's soap opera and find a link between past and present.
7	7	"The Fairest Show Means Most Deceit"	Piotr Szkopiak	Dan Muirden	6 March 2018
Frank and Luella are employed by gift shop owners Diana and Leon to investigate an ex-employee, Lola, who is claiming compensation for a workplace injury. The investigation is hampered by American Martin Mariner, who claims to be Frank's uncle. Frank finds Diana dead in the gift shop, apparently the victim of a robbery. Suspicion falls on Leon and then on Mariner, who had money covered in Diana's blood. He incriminates Lola's boyfriend Phil, who had shared texts with Diana. Sebastian goes undercover as a transvestite at a bar and as a gas man at Lola's house.
8	8	"The Chameleon's Dish"	Richard Signy	Nicola Wilson	7 March 2018
Frank and Luella are employed by troubled 18-year-old Hamish after he has premonitions of murder. They join him at a spiritual retreat run by his mother and stepfather. Staying at the retreat are his ex-girlfriend Lily, his best friend Uzoma, and others. Lily's psychotherapist mother, Polly, had been counselling Hamish and Uzoma at their sixth-form college until she was sacked. She tries to remove her daughter from the retreat, but Lily refuses to leave. The next day Polly is found dead with Hamish standing over her. He remembers nothing and is arrested by Marlowe. Lu looks into Polly's background and finds that she had had a relationship with Uzoma until he posted explicit photos of her online. Sebastian goes undercover at the teenagers' college. It is discovered that Hamish was adopted after his biological mother was murdered by his father when he was four, and Hamish found her dead. The 'premonitions' were his vague memories. After being released from prison, Hamish's father had taken on a false identity and married Hamish's adoptive mother to gain access to his son. He also murdered Polly to prevent his real identity being discovered; he is arrested by the police.
9	9	"The Rascal Cook"	Richard Signy	Kit Lambert	8 March 2018
Frank and Luella are employed by owner/chef Len Tekler of top restaurant Hiverna after sabotage in the kitchen. Frank suspects an inside job, but Tekler suspects food critic Paulina Stainton. Sebastian goes undercover in the kitchen, where he plants a hidden camera. The restaurant is closed when customers suffer a food poisoning incident. After Tekler is murdered by poisoning, Frank and Luella investigate the relationships of Paula Stainton, Tekler's wife Cecillia, his son Milo, waitress Dita Pardy, and Tekler's ex-partner Trevor Cordiss. The death of Tekler's brother, Michael—who hanged himself 20 years earlier—appears to be relevant.
10	10	"Ill Met by Moonlight"	Piotr Szkopiak	Kit Lambert	9 March 2018
Frank and Luella are employed by Lady Tania Bede when a valuable necklace and her 18-year-old daughter, Mia, go missing. She offers them £10,000 to recover the necklace by that evening, and later she receives a ransom demand of £50,000. The investigation reveals Mia's relationship with a man other than her boyfriend, whom she apparently met on the grounds of her stately home. They find evidence that garden labourer Lee Sandridge attempted to pawn the necklace, but he says that Mia asked him to do so and that the pawnbroker said it was worthless. Head gardener Ron Greenvale, who has already tendered his resignation, denies he is having an affair with Mia. A payment of £200 that Mia made to a local private hospital adds to the mystery. Frank and Luella, with Sebastian undercover as a waiter, attend Lady Bede's ball that evening to solve the mystery.

=== Series 2 (2019) ===
No. overall	No. in series	Title	Directed by	Written by	Original release date
11	1	"Outrageous Fortune"	Ian Barber	Jude Tindall	25 February 2019
Frank and Luella are employed to find a valuable mongrel dog that has gone missing. The dog, heir to a £320 million fortune since his owner died, lives a pampered lifestyle with numerous staff. The staff are dependent on the dog, as on its death the estate goes to charity. A £200,000 ransom is demanded, and Frank and Luella suspect an inside job. The ransom drop goes wrong, and the dog—identified by the dog's vet, who had not supported the dog's pampered lifestyle—is found dead. But something Frank spots at the dog's funeral indicates things are not as they appear.
12	2	"The Play's the Thing"	Matt Carter	Dan Muirden	26 February 2019
Frank and Luella are employed by Adrian Messenger, the writer/manager of a live-action role-playing game group, to follow his wife Maggie, whom he suspects is having an affair with another member, Major Tony Suffolk. Posing as members of the group, they are present when two members, Suffolk and another, are hit by crossbow bolts. When Maggie is arrested, Frank and Luella are asked by her husband to prove her innocence. They uncover that Suffolk had broken off the affair with Maggie, and that his army record is not what it seems.
13	3	"This Cursed Hand"	Paul Gibson	David Semple	27 February 2019
Frank and Luella are employed by Anastasia Kusk to find her husband, Russian oligarch Pavel. Tracing him to a hotel, Sebastian finds him dead and minus his right hand. Anastasia asks Frank and Luella to continue on the case, as her husband had a valuable art collection, but all are not who they seem. Two criminals are also after the hand, which has come into the possession of an out-of-work actor whom Sebastian has met to his cost. Events take an odder course when the left hand is cut from the corpse in the mortuary.
14	4	"Beware the Ides of March"	Gill Wilkinson	Rachel Smith	28 February 2019
Frank and Luella are employed by Julienne Fortby after she is injured during the psychic TV show she co-hosts with her sister, Marcia. She believes her sister is involved, until Marcia is also injured. Frank believes it is all fake, but Sebastian falls under Marcia's spell while Frank and Luella investigate a hostile audience member whose husband had died from a stroke and whose son, they find, works on the show.
15	5	"No More Cakes and Ale"	Gill Wilkinson	Paul Matthew Thompson	1 March 2019
Frank and Luella are employed by Portia Montgomery, a solicitor, to find evidence that her client, Ant Donahue, is innocent of a violent assault during a quad bike theft he was part of at a poultry farm. Frank and Luella search for a potential witness, a homeless woman sleeping rough at the farm at the time of the theft. The witness, who is known to Frank, turns out to be Portia's estranged mother. Ant's girlfriend turns against him. and a poultry distributor begins making threats.
16	6	"The Offered Fallacy"	Ian Barber	Kit Lambert	4 March 2019
Frank and Luella find themselves victims of lookalike imposters and are arrested by Marlowe and Keeler after £30,000 is stolen from an elderly lady. Out on bail, they discover the imposters are out of work actors employed by someone who has hacked their computers. Using Sebastian's acting skills and computer nerd Spider, they lay a trap that backfires leaving Frank to look for someone looking for revenge.
17	7	"Nothing Will Come of Nothing"	Matt Carter	Lol Fletcher	5 March 2019
Frank and Luella are employed by Ava Foyle to find her missing husband, Lorenzo, who has many debts, especially to the casino where Ava works, which is owned by two sisters, Rose and Queenie. Frank and Luella investigate the casino and discover Lorenzo had affairs with one sister, Queenie, and with a casino player, Lady Chaucer. Luella finds she has a talent for Poker and wins a memory stick with crucial information from a thief. Frank finds himself in a deadly game of roulette with Rose that will cost him his life if he loses the spin of the wheel.
18	8	"In My Memory Lock'd"	Darcia Martin	Dominique Moloney	6 March 2019
Frank and Luella are on surveillance when a man suffering from amnesia stumbles across their car. The man has no identification; only an expensive watch and a locker key. With Gloria's help, they get a clue that takes them to the Duke Vincent hotel where they discover evidence that he stayed there as a guest and worked as the hotel caretaker, but the staff deny all knowledge of him. As more of the man's memory returns, the team discovers that he is actually the owner of the hotel who had gone undercover to investigate potential embezzlement.
19	9	"The Envious Court"	Paul Gibson	Kit Lambert	7 March 2019
Frank and Luella are employed by Frederick Greenwood, owner of exclusive tennis club Runningbrook, who has received a death threat. Luella's mother, Genevieve, is the club's social secretary and romantically involved with Greenwood. The death threat turns into a blackmail demand after the head tennis player, romantically linked with Greenwood's granddaughter, is poisoned with aconite. Greenwood has to borrow the money for the blackmail demand from Luella's mother, arousing Luella's suspicions that the poisoning and blackmail are linked.
20	10	"Too Cold For Hell"	Darcia Martin	Jude Tindall	8 March 2019
Frank and Luella are employed by Bianca and Anthony Percy, a young couple who had their possessions stolen by a bogus removal company. After they track down the conmen to their lock-up, the police discover one of them shot dead. His accomplice "Billy Two Bricks," who is known to Frank, turns up later in their office looking for help. All the Percy's furniture is recovered except for a statue of an angel containing the ashes of Bianca's grandmother, who was the mother of underworld crime boss Claude Mortimer. Mortimer captures Frank, Billy, and sergeant Keeler and puts them in a refrigerated shipping container destined to be lost at sea. Together, Luella and Inspector Marlowe search for their missing partners, and past secrets are revealed.

=== Series 3 (2020) ===
No. overall	No. in series	Title	Directed by	Written by	Original release date
21	1	"How the Rogue Roar'd"	Jennie Paddon	Matthew Cooke and Vincent Lund	3 February 2020
Frank and Luella are employed by Henrietta Bolingbroke to help close down the Lucky Haul bingo hall in an area she wishes to redevelop. Frank is upset to find Eddie Monmouth, an old nemesis he imprisoned eight years previously for violent crimes, working at the hall. Monmouth claims he is a reformed character, alone since his wife left him and took their daughter with her. When hall owner Lucky Green is found dead, Frank suspects Monmouth, who unexpectedly confesses after being arrested for the murder. When they find the murder weapon at the home of an elderly bingo player, their attention turns to bingo caller JJ, assistant manager Megan Poins, and a missing contract signing over the hall over to Bolingbroke. Guest star: Vic Reeves (credited as Jim Moir)
22	2	"See Thyself, Devil!"	John Greening	Ed Sellek	4 February 2020
Frank and Luella are employed by Tony King, lead singer of the heavy metal rock band Caliban's Claw. King is intent on making a solo comeback but believes the Devil is trying to kill him. Years before, he says, the band had made a pact with the Devil for success, which they had until a fateful coach crash killed band member Ricky Cornwall, who was the fiancé of Sebastian's landlady Gloria Fonteyn. The band fell apart and disbanded, and their roadie Bushy, who had talked them into signing the "contract", died of an overdose a few years later. The third member Earl Albany, who is now a vicar, dies in front of Frank and Luella, hit by a bus while fleeing from what appears to be the Devil, leaving King the only member alive. Frank and Luella delve back to the fateful bus crash and its impact on the survivors, including Bushy and his infant son.
23	3	"The Sticking Place"	Miranda Howard-Williams	Johanne McAndrew	5 February 2020
Frank and Luella are employed by allotment holders threatened with eviction by Lady Mortimer, who has come under the influence of new estate manager Gerald Fitzallan following her husband's death. Fitzallan is poisoned with hemlock, and Keeler arrests allotment holder Dolly who is a biochemist. To prove her innocence, Frank and Luella investigate the backgrounds of Lady Mortimer and Fitzallan and discover their links to a London bullion robbery and missing gold. An unexpected confession solves the murder. Guest star: Philip Jackson
24	4	"A Serpent's Tooth"	Miranda Howard-Williams	Ishy Din	6 February 2020
Frank and Luella are employed by the mother of Haroon Malik and his friend Poonam Raja. Haroon was killed, crushed by fallen carpets, in a carpet warehouse owned by Poonam's father, from whom she has been estranged. Poonam's two sisters, Parthi and Pia, are now running the business due to their father's dementia. Frank and Luella uncover a failing business closing its stores and selling carpets to a rival business, confirmed by undercover work by Sebastian and Poonam. Among Haroon's personal effects, Frank and Luella find a book of Shakespeare quotes with an affectionate inscription from "P," raising the possibility of a crime of passion—but which sister?
25	5	"Thy Fury Spent"	Jennie Paddon	Kitty Percy	7 February 2020
Frank and Luella are employed by Sir Tim Forbes-Allen to find the missing curator of his new Shakespeare museum, Lucian Shaw, who he fears has been kidnapped. The museum had been beset by female protestors, The Herstorians, angry at Forbes-Allen's removal of important women from the museum. Frank and Luella find Shaw alive in a crate in the storage room, but the next morning Forbes-Allen is found dead. Speaking in front of the museum, noted feminist Dr Helen Middleton dramatically confesses to the murder and is arrested. But when five other women confess, each giving the name of an important woman of history, it becomes clear that the confessions are a publicity stunt. Shaw employs Frank and Lu to find a love letter he received from Forbes-Allen. A note to Shaw from the person who took the letter and a cheque from Lady Forbes-Allen, written in payment for finding Shaw, provide a link to the murderer. Guest star: Simon Williams
26	6	"Reputation, Reputation, Reputation!"	Piotr Szkopiak	Daisy Martey	10 February 2020
Frank and Luella are employed by self-obsessed Odette Dixon to investigate a fire at her hair salon that left her employee, Joelle, in a fatal coma. She suspects her rival salon owner Isobel Harris, whom she accuses of previous attempts to damage her business. Luella knows both Dixon and Harris from the time she owned her own salon and takes Frank and Sebastian into the cutthroat world of hairdressing. Together they uncover the tangled relationships that enabled Joelle to blackmail staff at both salons.
27	7	"Best Beware My Sting"	Paul Gibson	Dominique Moloney	11 February 2020
Frank and Luella are employed by Gordon Minola to investigate threats against him and his company Minola Energy by green activists known as Mortal Coil, led by Curtis Price. Minola's daughter, Kate, is a member of Mortal Coil, and her father is keeping her a virtual prisoner at home to prevent her from disrupting the wedding of his younger daughter, Bianca, to the wealthy Lucas De Boulay. Leaving the wedding, Bianca and Lucas are kidnapped, and Minola receives a ransom demand for £2 million. Somehow Bianca escapes, claiming Curtis murdered her husband by stabbing, and Keeler arrests Curtis after finding his fingerprints on the murder weapon. Kate pleads with Frank and Luella to prove Curtis is innocent.
28	8	"All That Glisters"	John Greening	Rob Kinsman	12 February 2020
Frank and Luella are employed by podcaster Emilia Belmont to investigate her mother Leah's death in a car accident 20 years earlier, for which she holds her estranged father responsible. Her father is part of a group of cryptic crossword setters, all of whom resist cooperating with the investigation. When Emilia's father is found dead in a park next to a memorial bench to Leah, Emilia calls a halt to the investigation. But Frank and Lu carry on, collecting four cryptic postcards sent to members of the group, which they believed would lead to the location of a fortune left by the group's founder. Frank realises the postcard clues are quite different from what the group assumed, leading them to a pawn shop, where Emilia is confronted with an uncomfortable truth.
29	9	"O Thou Invisible Spirit of Wine"	Piotr Szkopiak	Oliver Frampton	13 February 2020
Frank and Luella are employed by Melanie Montague, lessee of The Barchester Arms pub, to find a stolen photograph of "Old Lil." Melanie's great-great-grandmother, who ran the pub, is believed to have haunted the building since she was murdered 120 years ago. The investigation is hampered by ghost hunter Penelope Lawrence trying to prove the ghost's existence. Time is of the essence, as the pub's lease, renewed every thirty years, is up for renewal. If not renewed, the pub reverts to the Capulet family, something family head Stephen Capulet is keen to see happen. Lawrence is murdered as she leaves an answerphone message to Frank and Luella admitting she had stolen the photograph and stating it is more important than anyone realises. Frank and Luella discover a diary revealing the photograph contains proof of pub ownership. Guest star: Rosie Jones
30	10	"Teach Me, Dear Creature"	Paul Gibson	Dan Muirden	14 February 2020
Frank and Luella are employed by Jessica Duke to check that her son, Charlie, is not getting into any trouble and gives them access to her computer that has tracking software to her son's phone. Charlie, like his sister Isabella, is expected to go to Oxford University after taking specialist teaching at the SyracuseTuition Centre. Frank and Luella suspect an affair between Charlie and one of the tutors, Cassie Dorcas. Dorcas is later found murdered, and the case takes a new turn towards fraud, leaked examination papers, the centre's top tutor Amit Aziz (whom Dorcas disliked), and how far members of the Duke family will go to protect each other. Sebastian realises his dream to appear on stage at Stratford. Guest star: Tamzin Outhwaite

=== Series 4 (2022) ===
No. overall	No. in series	Title	Directed by	Written by	Original release date
31	1	"If It Be Man's Work"	Paul Gibson	Matthew Cooke and Vincent Lund	14 February 2022
Frank and Luella are employed by Bertie Tark, CEO of high-tech company Forosa, to find a mole leaking secrets of their about-to-be-launched fashion app. Their computer geek friend Spider, now the company's head of security, recommended Frank and Luella, and together they investigate the employees who present a happy front, despite the head of development, Dean Parolles, being an overbearing taskmaster. When Parolles is murdered, suspicion falls on employee Helena Mau, who claims to have developed the original app. But Spider—who has fallen for her—is convinced she is innocent.
32	2	"If Music Be the Food of Love"	David Innes Edwards	Karen Laws	15 February 2022
Frank and Luella are employed by Beatie Delamar to investigate a supposed curse on her dance school, to which the accidental deaths of three directors have been attributed. Sebastian goes undercover and discovers rivalry and jealousy at the school, as well as the fact the school was established by the six directors in a Tontine—now consisting of Beatie Delamar, her head teacher Tania Phikes, and Benedict Lovedon, Delamar's dance partner, who she lost touch with years ago. When Phikes is murdered, Frank and Luella find Lovedon at his sister's house. They spot a snow globe missing from Phikes's office and believed to be the murder weapon in the living room. Delamar cannot believe her first love committed the murders; and a unique hybrid rose, grown by Lovedon and named after Delamar, leads Frank and Luella to a murderer closer to home. Guest star: Danny John-Jules
33	3	"Too Much of Water"	Paul Gibson	Johanne McAndrew	16 February 2022
Frank and Luella are employed by Jonathan Skylark to investigate the death of his wife Ophelia at a river party—held to promote their failing business and celebrate her 40th birthday—by drowning in the River Avon. After an open verdict by the coroner, a £500,000 insurance policy payout rests on the investigation. The party had been organised by business partner Finty Lee-Jones and was attended by, among others, Ophelia's stepson, her best friend society photographer Vanessa-Rose, and suspected lover Antonio Da Costa. Ophelia had been spending the company's money, leading to a heated row with her husband the night of her death. Frank and Luella discover that Ophelia's morbid fear of water and the drowning of a 14-year-old girl 25 years earlier are linked by identical tattoos on Ophelia's, Vanessa's and the young girl's backs.
34	4	"Most Wicked Speed"	Ian Barber	Ed Sellek	17 February 2022
Frank and Luella are employed by American private investigator Joe Venice, who has been arrested by Sergeant Keeler for murder. He offers them $15,000 to prove his innocence and find a vintage American car, worth $150,000, for a collector in Hollywood. Frank crosses paths with criminals and boy racers from his past life in the police and discovers the car had been used in a group of Post Office robberies in 2003. A tattooist injured by the car in a 2002 street race and a petty criminal who is watching her lead Frank and Luella to the murderer and the solution of the robberies.
35	5	"Hunger for Bread"	Piotr Szkopiak	Fiona Evans	18 February 2022
Frank and Luella are employed by Val Twigg to investigate the business model of a rival slimming company, Fatblasters, which has stolen clients of her Twiggsters program. Luella goes undercover as a client to discover the method used to induce clients to lose weight. The head of Fatblasters is the charismatic Kit Willow, who used to work with Twigg and has a new business partner in Diana Winter. One of his clients is "Slim" Jim Sandford, who had lost a lot of weight but recently resumed gaining. Another client is Luella's sister Lia, and her fractious behaviour is never far away, as they also are clearing their mother's house approaching the anniversary of her loss at sea. When Willow is murdered in a frenzied attack, Detective Sergeant Keeler arrests Twigg as the last person to see him alive. Then both Lia and club cleaner Mary, who is also a client, begin to display erratic behaviour, leading Frank to suspect drugs.
36	6	"Die We Must"	David Innes Edwards	James Cary	21 February 2022
Frank and Luella are employed by eccentric scifi author Greg Alban to find the last chapter of his final book stolen in an apparent burglary. Brought to his home by Alban's security guard, their phones are confiscated and they become virtual prisoners. Frank quickly concludes the robbery was an inside job and the 12 stolen pages are in the house; the suspects are Alban's book editor, accountant, housekeeper, and the security guard. Sebastian, unable to contact Frank and Luella, is concerned for their safety and, after being rebuffed by Sergeant Keeler, seeks help from Constable Viola Deacon. Sebastian and Viola find the house where Frank and Luella are, just as the housekeeper finds Alban dead with a sword through his body and the missing last chapter. The security guard is missing, and Keeler arrests the housekeeper. Luella, reading the last chapter, realises the book characters are based on Alban's staff and uncovers a possible motive for murder.
37	7	"Some Cupid Kills"	John Maidens	Matthew Cooke and Vincent Lund	22 February 2022
Frank and Luella are employed by Pollie Grisham to find who murdered her boyfriend, actor Dalton Morley, by poisoning at Edie Brosnan's home. They both worked for As You Like It, actors who offer Shakespeare for hire for any occasion. Pollie was the PA to Ava Duffy who was selling the company. Sebastian goes undercover and discovers fellow actor Bernard Wiseau was jealous of Morley. Frank and Luella discover Morley had been given money by Brosnan whose previous husbands died in strange circumstances. Also, Morley had been having an affair with Ava Duffy (unbeknownst to Pollie) and stealing money from the company. Keeler arrests Wiseau as Frank and Luella investigate the tangled web.
38	8	"And Rarest Parts"	Piotr Szkopiak	Rex Obano	23 February 2022
Frank and Luella are employed by lottery winner Leroy King, who is convinced his son Arty, who died five years earlier in a trainspotting accident, is haunting him. His fiancée Katherine Courazon, a model who met Leroy when she handed him the £36 million lottery cheque five years earlier, is convinced it was a prankster. Leroy and his son were part of a trainspotting group with Owen Faulconbridge and his son Eddie who met at Arden station. The two families had fallen out over a pact to share the lottery win. Sebastian goes undercover as a trainspotter while Frank and Luella stake out King's house and nearly catch an intruder. When Courazon falls from the footbridge and is nearly killed, attention turns to guilt-ridden Eddie but in the background is the young platform assistant who had a heart transplant five years earlier.
39	9	"Time Decays"	Ian Barber	Toby Walton	24 February 2022
Frank receives by smart phone £5,000 anonymously to solve a crime yet to be committed on a walk along Shakespeare's Way organised by Swift Feet Walks. On the tour with Frank are Ben Yang and his wife Chen, a neuro-surgeon; Summer Styles, a prison physiotherapist; and Beverley Sinclair, who was an old friend of organiser Julian Hope. During the first night, Ben Yang is murdered and Sergeant Keeler arrests Frank on the evidence he has. Luella and Sebastian search for a link and learn all the tour party had won the trip as a prize, including Frank who had not opened his emails. They then discover Michael Reynolds, a thief who was married to Sinclair and business partner with Hope, who had fallen from a roof escaping from Frank, leaving him paralysed. Released from prison early on compassionate grounds he died within days from complications with his injuries.
40	10	"I No More Desire a Rose"	John Maidens	Dan Muirden	16 December 2022
Frank and Luella are employed by Arden town councillor, Elaine Davis, to investigate sabotage and threats to humiliate her and her project to replace Christmas with an inclusive Wintermas festival. A misunderstanding between Frank and Luella that one of them is leaving leads to Sebastian being given his first case. Sebastian's case involves graffiti at the house of widower Rob Davenport who is overprotective of his daughter, Olivia, since his wife died. Olivia resents the smothering attention. While Frank and Luella interview suspects, Sebastian realises the two cases are linked but too late to prevent himself and Rob Davenport being held captive in a house unable to get out.

=== Series 5 (2025) ===
No. overall	No. in series	Title	Directed by	Written by	Original release date
41	1	"Such A Mad Marriage Never Was Before"	Miranda Howard-Williams	Rebecca Ramsden	24 September 2025
The episode starts with the realisation that the partnership has broken up and Sebastian is trying to work for both partners. Finding themselves on opposing sides of a marital dispute, they find a way to solve the mystery by working together.
42	2	"The Heavenly Harness'd Team"	Khurrum M. Sultan	Rebecca Ramsden	1 October 2025
43	3	"Destruction, Blood And Massacre"	Paul Gibson	Afsaneh Gray	8 October 2025
The team take part in a murder-mystery dinner play, and soon the murder part becomes more than a game.
44	4	"A Dark House"	Khurrum M. Sultan	Helen Farrall	15 October 2025
45	5	"The Endeavour Of This Present Breath"	Paul Gibson	Matthew Cooke & Vincent Lund	22 October 2025
The team is called on to investigate possible sabotage of the local soccer team. When they go undercover to investigate, they find the coach who hired them dead, leaving Frank to move into the coaching position.
46	6	"As I Have Seen A Swan"	Caroline Slater	Lou Ramsden	29 October 2025
The team investigates the real identity of an anonymous hero called The Swan.
47	7	"An Honest Fellow"	Ian Barber	Asher Pirie	5 November 2025
48	8	"Be Not Afraid Of Greatness"	Ian Barber	Rebecca Ramsden	12 November 2025
49	9	"Daggers Of The Mind"	Miranda Howard-Williams	Tom Ogden	19 November 2025
During a horror convention, a noted horror writer is murdered. The team takes on the task of finding the killer. A new member gets added to the office.
50	10	"Such Sweet Sorrow"	Caroline Slater	Dan Muirden	26 November 2025
Frank and Lu pretend to be expectant parents in order to keep watch on a client's wife.

=== Series 6 (2026) ===
No. overall	No. in series	Title	Directed by	Written by	Original release date
51	1	"By Love's Own Sweet Constraint"	Unknown	Unknown	23 September 2026
52	2	"All The Power This Charm Doth Owe Me"	Unknown	Unknown	30 September 2026
53	3	"Nothing Else Holds Fashion"	Unknown	Unknown	7 October 2026
54	4	"The Eyes of the Ignorant"	TBA	TBA	14 October 2026
55	5	"Loathsome in its Own Deliciousness"	TBA	TBA	21 October 2026
56	6	"A Poor Player"	TBA	TBA	28 October 2026
57	7	"Present Mirth Hath Present Laughter"	TBA	TBA	4 November 2026
58	8	"Hell Is Empty and All The Devils Are Here"	TBA	TBA	11 November 2026
59	9	"A Rude Despiser of Good Manners"	TBA	TBA	18 November 2026
60	10	"Thou Art My All"	TBA	TBA	25 November 2026

== International broadcast ==
In Australia, the first series began airing on ABC on 8 June 2018, and on 9Gem on 2024. In Italy, the series began airing on RAI 2 on 4 August 2019. In Germany, series 1 started on 5 April 2019 on ZDFneo, with series 2 following from 12 June 2020 onwards, also on ZDFneo. In the United States, the first series began airing on PBS on 12 January 2019, with the subsequent series being run and rerun on various PBS stations; the fourth series was exclusively released on BritBox on 19 April 2022, then aired on PBS stations later in 2022. The series has also begun broadcasting in the Republic of Ireland via RTÉ One.

== Home media ==
Series / Special	UK release date	Notes
Series 1	23 April 2018	Disc One: Episode 1 – O Brave New World; Episode 2 – The Chimes at Midnight; Episode 3 – This Promised End; Episode 4 – This Rough Magic; Disc Two: Episode 5 – Toil and Trouble; Episode 6 – Exit, Pursued by a Bear; Episode 7 – The Fairest Show Means Most Deceit; Disc Three: Episode 8 – The Chameleon's Dish; Episode 9 – The Rascal Cook; Episode 10 – Ill Met by Moonlight
Series 2	25 March 2019	
Series 3	23 March 2020	
Series 4	21 March 2022	Episodes 1–9
Christmas Special	13 November 2023	Originally the last episode of Series 4, but was kept back to become a Christmas Special airing on 16 December 2022
Series 5	1 December 2025	
Series 6	30 November 2026	

A Region B-locked Blu-ray of Series 1 was released in March 2019 and Series 2 was released on both DVD and Blu-ray in the UK in April 2019.

Series	US release date	Notes
Series 1	March 5, 2019 Manufactured DVD	Disc One: Episode 1 – O Brave New World; Episode 2 – The Chimes at Midnight; Episode 3 – This Promised End; Episode 4 – This Rough Magic; Episode 5 – Toil and Trouble; Disc Two: Episode 6 – Exit, Pursued by a Bear; Episode 7 – The Fairest Show Means Most Deceit; Episode 8 – The Chameleon's Dish; Episode 9 – The Rascal Cook; Episode 10 – Ill Met by Moonlight
Series 2	July 9, 2019 MOD DVD+r	Disc One: Episodes 1 – 5 Disc Two: Episodes 6 – 10
Series 3	November 17, 2020 MOD DVD+r	Disc One: Episodes 1 – 5 Disc Two: Episodes 6 – 10
Series 4	October 4, 2022 MOD DVD+r	Disc One: Episodes 1 – 5 Disc Two: Episodes 6 – 10

== Reception ==
In a review of the first episode The Daily Telegraph called it "a nice, cosy drama" but found "plenty to dislike" about it, criticising in particular what it saw as an abundance of cliches, the character of Sebastian and the "crassness" of using the last names of William Shakespeare and his wife, Anne Hathaway, as the names of the detectives, and as the title of the series. The review stated, however, that daytime television, where the series airs in the UK, "is not really the place for complexity or grit". It also found that "the first episode of Shakespeare & Hathaway did at least set up two leading characters you'd want to see more of", and praised Benton and Joyner for their performances.

The Sunday Express found the programme "difficult to fault [...] well acted, nicely written—with decent jokes—and beautifully shot around Stratford". It compared the show favourably with other, grittier fare on offer in television drama schedules.

Reviewing the first episode of the second series in 2019, i newspaper praised the "easy chemistry" of Joyner and Benton, as well as "a strong supporting cast [that] includes nice turns from Roberta Taylor and Patrick Walshe McBride in particular". Overall, it says, "this is drama with the ham in the oven and turned up to ten. And yet somehow, it actually works". Paying special attention to the writing of creators Jude Tindall and Paul Matthew Thompson, it goes on to say that "the real appeal of this show lies in a gentle if arch charm, decent plots and a sense that if we're going to spend time in territory adjacent to Midsomer Murders, then you might as well have fun with it".
