= Jude Tindall =

English TV scriptwriter (1964–2024)

- Born: Judith Mary Tompkinson; 17 January 1964; King's Lynn, Norfolk
- Died: 4 August 2024 (aged 60)
- Education: Convent of the Sacred Heart
- Alma mater: University of St Andrews
- Occupations: TV scriptwriter and producer
- Television: Father Brown, Sister Boniface Mysteries, Shakespeare and Hathaway
- Spouse: Mark Donald Papillon Tindall
- Children: 3
- Parent(s): Michael and Mary

Jude Tindall (17 January 1964 – 4 August 2024) was the creator of the drama series Sister Boniface Mysteries, and co-creator of the detective comedy/drama Shakespeare and Hathaway.

== Biography ==
Tindall was born in King's Lynn, Norfolk. Her maiden name was Tompkinson. She was educated in Wokingham at the Convent of the Sacred Heart, going on to study history of art at the University of St Andrews. In 1989 she married Mark Donald Papillon Tindall, with whom she had three children.

== Tributes ==
Dominique Moloney of the Writers' Guild of Great Britain described Tindall as "passionate about her shows" and "prolific in her writing". The Guild's Deputy Director, Katherine Way, expressed "great admiration" for Tindall, and attributed such qualities to her as being "funny, incisive...and focused". Way also recalled that they had both been involved in writing for the TV series Doctors. Actor Richard Price, who appeared in many episodes of Father Brown penned by Tindall, was quoted in the Radio Times describing Tindall as a "wonderful creative", while The Daily Telegraph's obituary for Tindall described her as the "queen of cosy crime."
