= Upstairs Downstairs (2010 TV series) =

British television series from (2010–2012)

- Genre: Drama
- Created by: Heidi Thomas
- Based on: Upstairs, Downstairs by Jean Marsh; Eileen Atkins; John Hawkesworth; John Whitney
- Written by: Heidi Thomas; Steve Thompson; Debbie O'Malley
- Starring: Eileen Atkins; Claire Foy; Keeley Hawes; Neil Jackson; Ellie Kendrick; Art Malik; Jean Marsh; Nico Mirallegro; Anne Reid; Blake Ritson; Adrian Scarborough; Ed Stoppard; Laura Haddock; Alex Kingston; Ami Metcalf
- Theme music composer: Alexander Faris
- Opening theme: "The Edwardians"
- Composers: Daniel Pemberton (series 1); Carl Davis (series 2)
- Country of origin: United Kingdom
- Original language: English
- No. of series: 2
- No. of episodes: 9

Production
- Executive producers: Kate Harwood (series 1); Piers Wenger (series 1); Faith Penhale (series 2); Heidi Thomas; Rebecca Eaton
- Producers: Nikki Wilson (series 1); Ann Tricklebank (series 2)
- Running time: 60 minutes
- Production company: BBC Wales

Original release
- Network: BBC One
- Release: 26 December 2010 – 25 March 2012

Related
- Upstairs, Downstairs (1971)

Upstairs Downstairs is a British drama series, broadcast on BBC One from 2010 to 2012, and produced by BBC Wales. Created and written by Heidi Thomas, it is a continuation of the London Weekend Television series of the same name, which ran from 1971 to 1975 on ITV.

The series resumes the story of 165 Eaton Place in 1936 London, six years after the original series concluded. Jean Marsh reprises her role as Rose Buck, who becomes housekeeper of the re-established household, with Ed Stoppard and Keeley Hawes playing its new owners Sir Hallam and Lady Agnes Holland. The first series, consisting of three episodes, was broadcast across consecutive nights during Christmas 2010. The second series consists of six episodes, first aired between 19 February 2012 and 25 March 2012. The series ends at the outbreak of the Second World War in 1939.

== Production history ==
=== Series 1 ===
In October 2009, it was announced that the BBC was to revive the series as two 90-minute episodes to be broadcast on BBC One in the autumn of 2010, written by Heidi Thomas and set in 1936, six years after the original series finished.

The original series had concluded at the time of the Great Depression in 1930, with the Bellamy family having lost all its money in the crash of 1929. James Bellamy, the only son of Richard, Viscount Bellamy, had been responsible for persuading not only his family but also the faithful family servant, Rose Buck, to invest all their money in the stock market. Consequently, James committed suicide and the Bellamy family, as well as all the servants, left Eaton Place to start new lives. Mr. Hudson, the butler, and Mrs. Bridges, the cook, married and moved to the seaside, taking the kitchen maid, Ruby Finch, to live with them; Edward, the chauffeur, and his wife Daisy, the maid, were given new positions by the Bellamys' cousin, Georgina, and her husband, Lord Stockbridge, in their new country house; and Rose was offered a job as maid to Lord and Lady Bellamy at their small villa.

The new series sees Jean Marsh, as the only original cast member from the LWT series, reprising the role of Rose Buck. She now runs a domestic service agency, after having spent time away nursing a relative in the country. She returns to 165 Eaton Place as housekeeper to the new owners, the Holland family.

There are no explanations as to what has happened to the previous owners or their staff during the intervening six-year period. In the first instalment, the Bellamy family and the original staff are only fleetingly referenced when Mrs Thackeray, the new cook, refers to 165 Eaton Place as "the Bellamy house". However, Rose does mention Lord Bellamy as "the late", meaning he has died by 1936. Rose also mentions that a silver teapot, seen in some scenes of the first episode, was given to her as a gift by Lord Bellamy in appreciation of her years of "impeccable" service to the family. In another scene when Lady Agnes gives Rose the keys to the wine cellar, she mentions that they bear the name of Mr. Hudson on a label.

In August 2010, the BBC announced that the planned two 90-minute shows would instead be three hour-long episodes, with Keeley Hawes, Ed Stoppard, Eileen Atkins, Anne Reid, Claire Foy, Adrian Scarborough, Art Malik, Ellie Kendrick, Blake Ritson, and Nico Mirallegro joining Jean Marsh in the cast. Filming began in Cardiff in the middle of August 2010, with parts of the city transformed into 1930s Belgravia for exterior scenes, and the interiors shot in the BBC's Llandaff studios in Cardiff. Further filming of exterior scenes took place in Leamington Spa, Warwickshire, in September 2010, with a terrace in Clarendon Square doubling up as Eaton Place.

The new Upstairs Downstairs was made in-house by BBC Wales as a co-production with Masterpiece on PBS, and was broadcast on BBC1 with the first episode shown on 26 December 2010. A soundtrack album of music from the new series by composer Daniel Pemberton was released on iTunes. The three episodes were picked up by overseas broadcasters, including ABC in Australia, NRK in Norway, Sky in New Zealand, DR in Denmark, YLE in Finland, IBA in Israel, and TV4 in Sweden.

=== Series 2 ===
BBC1 commissioned six 60-minute episodes of the drama to be broadcast in 2012, with Stoppard, Hawes, Reid, Foy, Malik, Ritson, Mirallegro, Scarborough and Jackson all returning to the series. Sarah Gordy, introduced during series 1 as Hallam's sister Pamela, who has Down's Syndrome, and Alexia James, the household's Jewish ward Lotte, also continue to appear on a recurring basis. Eileen Atkins does not appear in series 2, having stated in the press that she was unhappy with the development of her character of Hallam's mother Maud; so Maud is said to have died in the time between the first and second series. Ellie Kendrick also left the cast, with the character of Ivy replaced in the household by Eunice McCabe (Ami Metcalf). The relationship between Eunice and Mrs Thackeray, the cook, is quite similar to the interaction between Ruby the kitchen maid (played by Jenny Tomasin) and Mrs Bridges the cook (played by Angela Baddeley) in the original 1971 series.

Jean Marsh, after suffering from a stroke and heart attack, was unable to attend the majority of filming for the series; scripts were altered shortly before filming to accommodate her absence. On-screen, Rose is confined to a sanatorium after contracting tuberculosis, and appears in just two scenes over the series.

Other new additions to the cast include Alex Kingston as Blanche Mottershead, the younger half-sister of Maud, and Laura Haddock as maid Beryl Ballard. Special guest stars in the series include Kenneth Cranham as Sergeant Ashworth, Michael Landes as American multimillionaire Caspar Landry, Emilia Fox as Blanche's lover Lady Portia Alresford, and Sarah Lancashire as Violet Whisset, a love interest for the butler Mr Pritchard.

== Characters ==
=== Upstairs ===
Actor	Character	Series
Ed Stoppard	Sir Hallam Holland, Bt	1–2
Keeley Hawes	Lady Agnes Holland	1–2
Eileen Atkins	Maud, Dowager Lady Holland	1
Claire Foy	Lady Persephone Towyn	1–2
Alex Kingston	Dr Blanche Mottershead	2
Sarah Gordy	Miss Pamela Holland	1–2
Blake Ritson	Duke of Kent	1–2

=== Downstairs ===
Actor	Character	Series
Jean Marsh	Rose Buck	1–2
Anne Reid	Clarice Thackeray	1–2
Adrian Scarborough	Warwick Pritchard	1–2
Art Malik	Amanjit Singh	1–2
Helen Bradbury	Rachel Perlmutter	1
Alexia James	Lotte Perlmutter	1–2
Neil Jackson	Harry Spargo	1–2
Nico Mirallegro	Johnny Proude	1–2
Ellie Kendrick	Ivy Morris	1
Laura Haddock	Beryl Ballard	2
Ami Metcalf	Eunice McCabe	2

== Plot ==
Sir Hallam Holland, a young diplomat, moves into the townhouse along with his wife, Lady Agnes, in January 1936 shortly before the death of King George V. They engage former parlourmaid Rose Buck, now running her own agency for domestic servants, to find them staff as they renovate the house to its former glory after its years of being mothballed.

As they settle into London life, they are joined by Lady Agnes's fiery young debutante sister Lady Persephone; Sir Hallam's overbearing widowed mother Maud, who moves herself into the house along with secretary and pet monkey; and a young, barely-trained house staff serving under a reluctant housekeeper. Added to these stresses are the still-painful memory of Lady Agnes's past miscarriage, a mystery surrounding Sir Hallam's sister, who died very young, and a surprise foster-child whom they feel obliged to maintain. The new downstairs staff slowly begin to pull together as a unit, overcoming differences of class and background as they come to know one another's stories.

== Episodes ==
=== Series overview ===
Series	Episodes	Originally released	
Series	Episodes	First released	Last released
1	3	26 December 2010	28 December 2010
2	6	19 February 2012	25 March 2012

=== Series 1 (2010) ===
The first series aired in the UK in December 2010. These episodes were featured in the U.S. on PBS's Masterpiece Classic in April 2011. VisionTV in Canada premiered the episodes in October 2011. ABC1 in Australia began airing the series on 4 December 2011.

This series was set in 1936.

No. overall	No. in series	Title	Directed by	Written by	Original release date	UK viewers (millions)
1	1	"The Fledgling"	Euros Lyn	Heidi Thomas	26 December 2010	8.85
January & February 1936. Sir Hallam Holland and his wife, Lady Agnes, move into 165 Eaton Place, and set about restoring the house. Former housemaid Rose Buck finds herself back in the house where she was happiest, and the arrival of an unwelcome guest – Sir Hallam's mother, the widowed Lady Maud Holland – puts a strain on relations, both upstairs and downstairs.
2	2	"The Ladybird"	Euros Lyn	Heidi Thomas	27 December 2010	8.13
June–October 1936. Sir Hallam finds his diplomatic skills put to the test at home as well as at work. The servants are intrigued by a mysterious new addition to the household, while a restless Lady Persie, who has moved to London to be presented as a debutante, embarks on a dangerous flirtation, and is drawn to the thrill of fascist politics.
3	3	"The Cuckoo"	Saul Metzstein	Heidi Thomas	28 December 2010	8.18
November & December 1936. Sir Hallam finds himself at the centre of a national crisis when his friend, the Duke of Kent, asks for help. Meanwhile, storm clouds are gathering within 165 Eaton Place, with Lady Agnes's growing fear over the imminent arrival of her baby, and the servants' concern for Lotte, who refuses to speak. But, as King Edward finally abdicates, Hallam makes a discovery that will change his life forever.

=== Series 2 (2012) ===
This series was set from 1938 to 1939.

No. overall	No. in series	Title	Directed by	Written by	Original release date	UK viewers (millions)
4	1	"A Faraway Country About Which We Know Nothing"	Marc Jobst	Heidi Thomas	19 February 2012	7.87
September 1938. Hallam's concerns over Germany lead to an unexpected encounter. Following Maud's death and the birth of her second child, Agnes is glad for support from Maud's younger sister, Professor Blanche Mottershead. However, not everyone is pleased with her continued presence in Eaton Place. Downstairs, new servant Beryl Ballard arrives and catches Harry's eye, and a secret about Mr Pritchard is revealed.
5	2	"The Love That Pays the Price"	Marc Jobst	Heidi Thomas	26 February 2012	6.70
November 1938. Agnes is told she can have no more children, and distracts herself by throwing a dinner party where she and Hallam meet American millionaire Caspar Landry. Also attending the dinner is the US Ambassador to the Court of St. James, Joseph P. Kennedy, his wife, Rose, and their son, John F. Kennedy, who makes a brief appearance downstairs. Blanche and Mr Amanjit work to rescue Jewish children from Germany, and after receiving a phone call from Lady Persie in Germany during Kristallnacht, Agnes convinces her husband to help her sister as well. Meanwhile, with Rose still absent Mr Pritchard and Mrs Thackeray's clashes over the running of the household lead to the latter's resignation.
6	3	"A Perfect Specimen of Womanhood"	Anthony Byrne	Heidi Thomas	4 March 2012	5.86
January 1939. The house is rocked by controversy when the publication of a scandalous novel exposes Blanche's unconventional lifestyle, bringing her face to face with the author of the book—her former lover, Lady Portia Alresford. But when the passion between the pair reignites, Blanche becomes conflicted. Meanwhile, Persie reveals a shocking secret to Hallam, and Beryl's workload prompts her to take a stand. Lady Agnes is distraught, until a familiar old face offers a few wise words.
7	4	"All the Things You Are"	Brendan Maher	Steve Thompson	11 March 2012	5.51
March 1939. Harry signs up for a boxing tournament to impress Beryl, only to be told he is too old for the ring, so he recruits Johnny as his protégé. Upstairs, the Hollands drift further apart, with Lady Agnes drawn to Caspar Landry, who shows her an exciting world away from Eaton Place, while Sir Hallam becomes distracted by his desire for another woman—and makes a dangerous decision that will change his life forever.
8	5	"The Last Waltz"	Brendan Maher	Debbie O'Malley	18 March 2012	5.56
July & August 1939. Matters of the heart concern the masters and staff of Eaton Place, as Mr Pritchard finds romance at the annual servants' ball, prompting him to wonder if there is more to life than service. Hallam and Persie continue their dangerous affair—only for the diplomat to discover just how destructive his actions have been. Harry responds to the advent of war by making a proposal to Beryl, but a shocking revelation may put paid to his plans.
9	6	"Somewhere Over the Rainbow"	Anthony Byrne	Heidi Thomas	25 March 2012	5.22
August & September 1939. Lady Agnes returns home, desperate to heal the rift in her marriage, and Sir Hallam is more than willing to make amends for his part in their troubles. But a dark discovery leaves them reeling and looks set to change the landscape of Eaton Place permanently. On the eve of war, Beryl and Harry race against time to get married, while a shame-faced Mr Pritchard packs his bags after his behaviour, leaving the running of the house in chaos—until an old familiar face, Rose Buck, lends a hand.

== Reception ==
Series 1 was aired in the UK over three consecutive nights commencing 26 December 2010. It was a substantial ratings success, garnering viewing figures of 8.85, 8.13 and 8.18 million respectively and winning in its slot against all seasonal competition. The programme was nominated for six Primetime Emmy awards in 2011.

The second series of six episodes began on 19 February 2012, with an audience of 7.78 million, but by the time it ended on 25 March, the viewing figures had dropped to 5.22 million. It was confirmed on 21 April 2012 that Upstairs Downstairs would not be returning for a third series.

== Soundtrack ==
Composer Carl Davis was brought in for the second series, composing new incidental music, occasionally using elements from Alexander Faris's original theme for the original 1971 series – which was popularised as a single release by Mantovani. Davis's music was released as a soundtrack album and was nominated for the Ivor Novello Awards in 2013, but did not win.
