= Open Air Theatre, Barra Hall Park =

Amphitheater in London, England

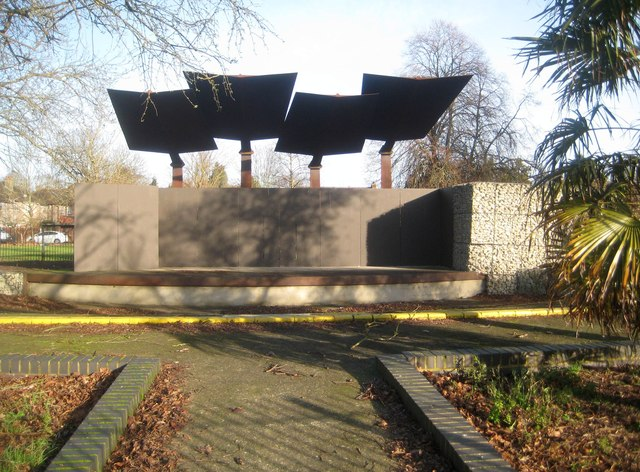
- Interactive map of Open Air Theatre, Barra Hall Park
- Address: Barra Hall Park, Hayes; London; United Kingdom
- Coordinates: 51°31′07″N 0°25′24″W
- Owner: Hillingdon London Borough Council
- Capacity: 180
- Type: Open-air theatre

Construction
- Opened: 1951
- Rebuilt: 2005

Website
- hillingdon.gov.uk/open-air-theatre

The Open Air Theatre, Barra Hall Park in Hayes, West London, England, is a purpose-built outdoor theatre with concrete-step seating for up to 180 people. Originally built in 1951, the structure fell into disrepair and was rebuilt in steel in 2005.

== Type ==
The Open Air Theatre in Barra Hall Park is a modern, steel-built structure. Four steel umbrellas simultaneously give protection to the stage and reflect sound towards the audience. The stage backdrop is made up of vertical sheets of steel. The indoor back-stage area has toilets and two small dressing rooms.

== History ==
The original Open Air Theatre in Barra Hall Park, Hayes was built in 1951 as a community venue for music, theatre and dance. Over time, the structure fell into disrepair, and the local community raised funds for its reconstruction. The 2005 steel-rebuild was designed by architects Angela Brady (former president of the Royal Institute of British Architects) and Robin Mallalieu, whose aim for a theatre which would have sculptural and visual interest even when not in use produced a theatre with an abstract, enigmatic quality.

Standout productions include performances of Shakespeare's The Tempest (2004) and Hotbuckle Productions' 2015 adaptation of Jane Austen's Persuasion.

== Transport ==
=== Buses ===
The 195, 278, and H98 buses stop near Barra Hall Park on Church Road, and the U4 stops near the park at Lilac Gardens on Judge Heath Lane. Hayes Town Centre is approximately 1 km away, with its many other regular bus services.

=== Train ===
The closest railway station is Hayes & Harlington, approximately 1 km away on foot. It is served by the Elizabeth Line.

=== Car ===
On-site parking is available. Street parking (Park and Pay) may be found on the surrounding roads near to the entrances.
