= Jiordan Tolli =

Australian actress and singer (born 1994)

- Born: Jiordan Anna Tolli; 17 June 1994 (age 32)
- Occupations: Actress; singer
- Years active: 1994–present
- Musical career
- Genres: Indie pop; alternative pop; pop
- Instrument: Vocals

Jiordan Anna Tolli (born 17 June 1994) is an Australian actress and singer, known for playing the role of Lolly Allen in the Australian soap opera Neighbours. In 2013, Tolli competed in the fifth season of The X Factor Australia and was the eighth contestant eliminated.

== Early life ==
Jiordan Anna Tolli was born in 1994 to parents Luke and Vanda. Her cousin, Fabio Tolli, was married to her former Neighbours co-star Kym Valentine, who played Libby Kennedy. Prior to entering The X Factor, she performed in a lot of musical theatre.

== Career ==
Tolli was cast in the role of Louise "Lolly" Carpenter in the long-running soap opera Neighbours when she was two months old. Her parents had answered a casting call put out by Jan Russ for a baby to play the role of Tom Oliver (Lou Carpenter) and Caroline Gillmer's (Cheryl Stark) on-screen daughter. After seven years of playing Lolly, Tolli left Neighbours in 2001 to focus on her schooling. Tolli's mother said it was "the right time" for her daughter to leave and the producers agreed.

"I remember the fun times. I was a kid. Who else gets that kind of opportunity when they're a baby? I wasn't really acting. I just played on set."

— Tolli speaking about her time on Neighbours.

In 2011, Tolli made a guest appearance in the third series of Tangle. She will appear as Caitlyn in the upcoming film Is This The Real world. starring Sean Keenan and Charlotte Best. In August 2013, it was confirmed that Tolli would be making a one-off appearance in Neighbours as Lolly to celebrate Lou's 70th birthday. As she had spent a large portion of her childhood on the show, Tolli said she was comfortable returning to the set to film her scenes. Tolli appeared during the episode broadcast on 4 October 2013.

=== The X Factor Australia ===
In 2013, Tolli auditioned for the fifth season of The X Factor Australia with Birdy's version of "People Help the People". She commented that her time on Neighbours helped calm her nerves. Tolli advanced to the super bootcamp stage of the competition. On the first day of super bootcamp, Tolli sang a rendition of "Pumped Up Kicks" by Foster The People and advanced to the second stage of super bootcamp, where she sang "Last Request" by Paulo Nutini. On the final day of super bootcamp, Tolli performed "Running Up That Hill" by Kate Bush to the judges and a live audience of one thousand. She then advanced to the home visits stage and was put into the Girls category, which was mentored by Redfoo. At the home visits, Tolli sang "Bizarre Love Triangle" by Frente! for Redfoo and his assistant will.i.am and advanced to the live shows. During the first week of the live shows, Tolli sang "Smile" by Lily Allen and she advanced to the second week, where she sang Michael Jackson's "Thriller". On 10 September, Tolli's performance of "Thriller" debuted at number sixty-three on the ARIA Singles Chart, becoming Tolli's first single to debut on a national chart.

In week five of the live shows, Tolli fell into the bottom two alongside Joelle Hadjia but was saved after judges Ronan Keating, Natalie Bassingthwaighte and Dannii Minogue all opted to eliminate Hadjia. Following the eliminations of Hadjia and Ellie Lovegrove, Tolli became the only remaining contestant in the Girls category. In week seven of the live shows, Tolli fell into the bottom two alongside Omar Dean but was saved via deadlock. Tolli's performance of Lorde's "Royals" debuted on the ARIA Singles Chart at number eighty-one. In week eight of the live shows, Tolli fell into the bottom two alongside Third Degree. The judges vote went to deadlock, and Tolli was the eighth contestant eliminated after it was revealed she received the fewest votes. Tolli appeared on Sunrise on 21 October 2013, as a guest reporter doing a segment on the backstage drama of The X Factor. In November 2013, she embarked on The X Factor Live Tour across Australia with Third Degree, Taylor Henderson, Dami Im and Jai Waetford.

==== Performances on The X Factor ====
denotes having entered the ARIA Singles Chart.
denotes having been in the bottom two.
denotes having been eliminated.

Show	Theme	Song	Original artist	Order	Result
Audition	Free choice	"People Help the People"	Birdy	N/A	Through to super bootcamp
Super bootcamp 1	Solo performance	"Pumped Up Kicks"	Foster The People	N/A	Through to super bootcamp 2
Super bootcamp 2	Group performance	"Last Request"	Paulo Nutini	N/A	Through to super bootcamp 3
Super bootcamp 3	Solo performance	"Running Up That Hill"	Kate Bush	N/A	Through to home visits
Home visits	Free choice	"Bizarre Love Triangle"	Frente!	N/A	Through to live shows
Week 1	Judges' Choice	"Smile"	Lily Allen	3	Safe
Week 2	Legends	"Thriller"	Michael Jackson	5	Safe
Week 3	Top 10 Hits	"With Or Without You"	U2	10	Safe
Week 4	Latest and Greatest	"Burn"	Ellie Goulding	6	Safe
Week 5	Rock	"Dancing With Myself"	Billy Idol	5	Bottom two
Week 5	Final Showdown	"Torn"	Natalie Imbruglia	2	Saved
Week 6	Family Heroes	"Don't Speak"	No Doubt	6	Safe
Week 7	Judges Challenge	"Royals"	Lorde	5	Bottom two (5th)
Week 7	Final Showdown	"Stay"	Rihanna	2	Saved via deadlock
Week 8	Aussie Hits	"Somebody That I Used To Know"	Gotye	2	Bottom two (5th)
Week 8	Final Showdown	"Young and Beautiful"	Lana Del Rey	1	Eliminated (5th Place)

=== 2014: Debut EP, In Transit ===
On 4 April 2014, Tolli performed at the Revesby Workers Club in Revesby, New South Wales, as part of the Best of Tour with fellow X Factor contestants Kelebek and Omar Dean and The Voice Australia contestant Michael Stangel. On 4 September 2014, Tolli uploaded two new original songs "Further" and "Hesitate" onto Triple J Unearthed. The response from her fans was extremely positive, with both songs receiving a high rating and "Further" charting at number seventy-six. Tolli announced that she is working on her debut EP, with producer Andrew Lowden. It was released on 19 October 2015 and called In Transit.

== Artistry ==
Tolli cites Birdy, Lorde, Lana Del Rey, Jewel, Johnny Cash and Norah Jones as her musical influences, as well as contemporaries such as The xx, The Jezabels, Angus and Julia Stone and Radiohead as her musical influences. In an interview with Pop Sugar, Tolli was asked about which of her X Factor performances represented the musical direction she wanted to go in. She stated that it was her performances of Lana Del Rey's "Young and Beautiful", Lorde's "Royals" and Rihanna's "Stay".

== Concert tours ==
- The X Factor Live Tour (2013)
- The Best of Tour (2014)

== Discography ==
=== X Factor charted performances ===
Title	Year	Peak chart positions
Title	Year	AUS
"Thriller"	2013	63
"Royals"	2013	81

== Filmography ==
Year	Title	Role	Notes
1994–2001, 2013	Neighbours	Louise "Lolly" Carpenter	Regular role
2011	Tangle	Girl #2	
2013	Is This The Real World	Caitlyn	
