= Lou Carpenter =

Fictional character from the Australian soap opera Neighbours

- Neighbours character
- Portrayed by: Tom Oliver
- Duration: 1988, 1992–2016
- First appearance: 30 March 1988
- Last appearance: 2 December 2016
- Created by: Ray Kolle
- Introduced by: Don Battye
In-universe information
- Occupation: Entrepreneur; Used car salesman; Radio presenter; Mayor; Owner of Lou's Place; Owner of Carpenter's Mechanics; Co-owner of Harold's Store; Co-owner of Dial-A-Kyle
- Father: Arthur Carpenter
- Sisters: Brenda Riley
- Wife: Kathy Carpenter (divorced); Linda Carpenter (until 1996); Trixie Tucker (2003–2004)
- Sons: Guy Carpenter
- Daughters: Ling Mai Chan; Lauren Carpenter
- Adoptive daughters: Lolly Allen
- Stepdaughters: Nina Tucker
- Grandsons: Mason Turner; Bailey Turner
- Granddaughters: Paige Smith; Amber Turner
- Other relatives: Matilda Turner; Gabriel Smith

Lou Carpenter is a fictional character from the Australian soap opera Neighbours, played by Tom Oliver. He made his first screen appearance on 30 March 1988. Oliver appeared for a brief time, having been initially contracted for six months, before leaving and returning in January 1992 as a regular cast member. In 1996, Lou was written out of Neighbours, a move that shocked Oliver as his character had become popular with fans. Neighbours viewers created petitions calling for his return and the strength of their reaction caused the producers to reconsider their decision and reinstate Oliver. Lou became one of the longest-serving characters in the serial's history, playing the role continuously for 24 years.

From March 2009, Lou became a part-time regular character, with Oliver alternating between two-month blocks of filming and two-month breaks. In May 2015 Lou departed as a regular cast member, but returned for guest appearances until the end of the 2016 season.

== Casting ==
Oliver joined the cast of Neighbours as Lou in 1988. He was initially contracted for six months. The character was written out in 1996 after the Neighbours producers decided to employ an "out with the old and in with the new" policy. Oliver was shocked and angry over the decision to axe his character and he said he was not offered an explanation as to why his contract was not going to be renewed. He told Inside Soap "I don't understand it at all, Lou is very popular with everyone, especially the kids, who even come up to me in the street and say: I wish my dad was more like Lou." Oliver agreed to stay with the show past his original departure date, so the writers could have enough time to give Lou a respectable send-off rather than have him killed in a car accident or explosion.

When the news of Oliver's sacking was revealed, Neighbours viewers called for his return and created petitions asking for him to be reinstated. The strength of the public's reaction took the producers by surprise, as they were not aware of how popular he was in Australia and the UK. A writer for Inside Soap said "So they began to reconsider the situation, especially when Caroline Gillmer, who plays Cheryl, chose to leave. And soon the decision was made - Lou was returning to Ramsay Street full time." Oliver commented that he was "totally overwhelmed" by the public support for him.

In April 2009, it was announced that Oliver would cut back on filming with Neighbours. Oliver reduced his hours and appeared part-time, like his former co-star Ian Smith. His new contract meant he alternated between four months of filming and four-month breaks. This later became two months on and two months off. By 2012, Oliver was the show's longest-serving male cast member.

== Development ==
=== Characterisation ===
Lou is often a positive person, even when things fail. He is loyal and enthusiastic about each new challenge. Tony Johnston, author of Neighbours: 20 years of Ramsay Street, said Oliver has pulled off the remarkable task of imbuing a "dodgy character with some irresistibly likable qualities." He described Lou as being a ready confidant and an eternal dreamer. Oliver described Lou as "Mischievous, humorous and honest" and told a writer for the BBC's Neighbours website that he does share some similarities with him. The actor revealed that he initially played Lou as an older version of Jack Sellars, a character he portrayed in the television series Number 96. He also explained that he stole Lou's distinctive "dirty laugh" from Sid James, saying "The script said: 'Gives big dirty laugh.' I thought, who's got the dirtiest laugh I can think of? Sid James! I used to love his Carry On movies." A writer for television website, Throng, branded Lou a "lovable rogue" and they said he has charmed the viewers over the years. David Balls of Digital Spy said Lou is "one of Erinsborough's most distinguished residents." A writer for Inside Soap said Lou has become known for his scams and quick one-liners.

=== Friendship with Harold Bishop ===
Lou's friendship with Harold Bishop (Ian Smith) has been an important element to his characterisation. They attended the same school and Lou was Harold's "nemesis" and rival for Madge Ramsay's (Anne Charleston) affections. Oliver told David Balls of Digital Spy that Lou had always had a huge crush on Madge and he decides to go to Ramsay Street to steal her from Harold on their wedding day. However, Lou fails to stop the wedding and he leaves. Lou returns four years later, after Harold has disappeared and ends up living with Madge. Harold returns and he and Lou become friends. Oliver said some reviewers had likened Lou and Harold's relationship to Laurel and Hardy and The Odd Couple. Erica Thompson of The Courier-Mail said Harold and Lou's friendship was one of her favourite "bromances" on television. She said their most bromantic moment was "When Harold returned to Erinsborough, after being feared drowned for many years, he had no memory of his old life. But when Lou served him jelly one night Harold suddenly remembered how Lou used to tease him at school by calling him "Jelly Belly" and, presto, his memory was restored."

Lou raises money for Harold's bail, when he is imprisoned after a case of mistaken identity. Harold later donates a kidney to Lou and they go into business together, founding the General Store. Harold and Lou both fall for Rosie Hoyland (Maggie Millar), which leads to some arguments and Harold destroying a love letter from Lou to Rosie. Peter Mattessi of The Age said the writers decided to tweak the "standard love triangle story" when Gino Esposito (Shane McNamara) moves in with Harold. Lou becomes jealous of Gino and Harold's friendship. Of this, Mattessi said "The tension this created between Lou and Harold ("same-sex platonic life-partners", according to Toadie) was a wonderful storytelling twist." After Smith announced his departure in 2008, Oliver was asked if Lou would be sad about his best friend's exit and he said "Oh yes, definitely, but the old rascals keep in touch all the time. It was a sad farewell. Not just in character, but for me and Ian [Smith] too". Smith returned in May 2011 and Harold and Lou were reunited. Harold reveals he is engaged to Carolyn Johnstone (Paula Duncan) and while most of his friends are happy for him, Lou is not quite so pleased that Harold has a new lady in his life.

=== Painkiller addiction ===
Lou starts taking painkillers to ease his chronic back pain and he slowly becomes addicted to them. When Madge dies, Lou comes to rely on painkillers and sleeping tablets to numb his despair. A writer for Inside Soap said Lou goes to extreme lengths to maintain a supply of pills, including lying to his friends. Lou's attitude becomes "darker" and in his desperation for more pills he lies to Karl Kennedy (Alan Fletcher) that he lost his previous prescription. Lou also begs Harold for any pills he might have, and he also visits a late night pharmacy for more medication. When Toadfish Rebecchi (Ryan Moloney) expresses his concern over Lou's actions, Lou snaps and fires him from the pub. Lou eventually realises he needs help and begins attending Narcotics Anonymous.

=== Reintroduction of family ===
During an October 2012 interview with a What's on TV reporter, Oliver was asked if would like some of Lou's family to return. Oliver then revealed that there was a possibility that Lou's daughter, Lauren, would be coming back. He also expressed his desire to see Lou's adopted daughter, Louise "Lolly" Allen, return as an adult. The following month it was announced that Lauren would be returning to the serial, now played by Kate Kendall. Lauren returns to Erinsborough with her husband Matt (Josef Brown), and their three children – Mason (Taylor Glockner), Amber (Jenna Rosenow) and Bailey (Calen Mackenzie). However, when Lauren initially arrives, only Amber and Bailey are with her and she tells Lou that Mason is busy with work. An Inside Soap columnist noted that there was more to his absence than meets the eye. Lou becomes worried about how Lauren will react when she learns about "his fall from grace", especially how he embezzled from his business partner and worked as a male escort. When "shamefaced" Lou confesses to Lauren that he is unemployed and broke, she tells him that she understands and is still proud of him. When Lauren and her family are invited to stay at Number 32, Lou is delighted to be surrounded by his family again.

Shortly after his family's arrival, Lou was attacked by a masked intruder in his house and knocked to the floor. Inside Soap's Sarah Ellis said it was "a horrifying ordeal" for Lou. Oliver explained that Lou reacts first and thinks later, so he does not have time to be frightened of the intruder. He continued "Before he knows it, he's struggling with the guy and ends up in a heap on the floor." Nothing is taken during the incident, so Lou believes that he has interrupted the guy just in time. When Lauren finds out what has happened, she is concerned for her father and insists that he gets his head looked at. Lou's only concern is how something like this could happen in the "close-knit" neighbourhood and Ellis wondered if the culprit could be closer to home. Oliver stated that Lou is not aware that anything untoward has happened with his family, but he would be upset if they had something to do with the incident. Oliver expressed his delight at having Lou's on-screen family back, saying "Lou's like a new man – for the first time in ages, he really belongs somewhere. He's not the 'stand-in' father or grandfather anymore – this is his real family." Oliver told Ellis that there would be lots coming up for Lou as he spends time working out what his family are trying to cover up, noting that they were full of secrets.

Following all the trouble with Mason, Lou is reminded that nothing is more important than family. He is then persuaded to get in contact with his estranged daughter, Ling Mai Chan (Khym Lam) by Sheila Canning (Colette Mann). He sends Ling Mai an email, which she replies to, asking him to visit her. Lou then takes a couple months off to go to Cambodia. The storyline was inspired by Oliver's real life trip to the country, where he is an ambassador for the Elephant Nature Park. Louise (played by Jiordan Tolli) was reintroduced to Neighbours for one episode in October 2013 to help celebrate Lou's 70th birthday. As his family organise a birthday party, Lou becomes concerned that three generations of Carpenter men have died the week they turned 70. Oliver commented Lou was taking that very seriously and decides to get a check-up at the hospital. Lou is given a clean bill of health and he is delighted to find his family have gathered to celebrate his birthday when he returns home. Oliver said "At first Lou is a bit concerned about the party, but then he sees his daughter Lolly and everything changes. He's delighted, as he's been quite absent from her life in recent years." Oliver revealed that he was "thrilled" when the producers told him Tolli was going to reprise the role of Louise. The actor added that Lou is also happy to learn that he actually turned 70 the previous year, thus breaking the family curse.

=== Departure and guest returns ===
On 1 May 2015, Lou was seen moving to Queensland with his grandson Bailey on-screen, and was subsequently removed from the series' opening titles. It was later confirmed that Oliver had left the regular cast of Neighbours but would continue to make guest appearances, starting with "a significant storyline" later in 2015. On 26 October 2016, David Knox of TV Tonight reported that Oliver would be leaving the cast after 28 years following his latest guest stint, which began from 4 November. Producers refused to rule out future return appearances, with executive producer Jason Herbison stating that "Tom Oliver is one of our all-time favourites and in Lou Carpenter has created one of Australian TV's most iconic characters". Following the 2022 finale of Neighbours, it was confirmed that Oliver had declined an invitation to reprise the role and was now retired.

== Storylines ==
While he was in high school, Lou met and fell in love with Madge Ramsay; however, he had a rival for her affections in the form of Harold Bishop. Madge eventually chose to marry Fred Mitchell (Nick Waters) and moved away with him. Lou became a wealthy man due to his various businesses and he went on to marry Kathy (Tina Bursill). The couple had two children, Guy (Andrew Williams) and Lauren (Sarah Vandenbergh), but they later divorced. Madge eventually rekindles her relationship with Harold and the two become engaged, but after a disagreement Madge goes on a number of dates with Lou during a trip to Brisbane. Lou follows Madge back to Erinsborough and appears at her house while she is telling Harold of her infidelity. Lou continues to try to stop the wedding and asks Madge to marry him instead. Madge eventually turns Lou down and he returns to Brisbane, where he marries a younger woman named Linda (Gina Gaigalas). The marriage does not last.

After Harold is swept out to sea and presumed dead, Lou comforts Madge. He follows her to Erinsborough, on the pretence of visiting his sister, Brenda Riley (Genevieve Lemon). Lou decides to stay in Erinsborough and he opens a used car business. He also begins dating Madge and they get engaged. They break up when Lou realises Madge does not trust him around other women. Lou rents out some rooms in his home to Beth Brennan (Natalie Imbruglia), Cameron Hudson (Benjamin Grant Mitchell) and Annalise Hartman (Kimberley Davies). Lou and Annalise begin dating and they become engaged, but Lou ends the relationship when he learns Annalise is only seventeen. Benito Alessi (George Spartels) becomes Lou's partner at the car yard, but he sells his shares to Jim Robinson (Alan Dale). Following Jim's death, Lou is displeased to discover Julie Martin (Julie Mullins) is his new partner. However, Julie increases sales and Lou is grateful. Lauren comes to stay and Rick Alessi (Dan Falzon) also moves in, becoming a surrogate son to Lou. Lou meets Cheryl Stark (Caroline Gillmer) and they eventually begin a relationship. They move in together and Cheryl becomes pregnant. She gives birth to a daughter, who she and Lou name Louise (Jiordan Anna Tolli). Not long after, Lou learns he has another daughter, Ling Mai Chan (Khym Lam), from a previous relationship. Lou gets a radio show on a local station and becomes Mayor of Erinsborough. Lou and Cheryl get into debt and they sell the car yard, but retain The Waterhole pub.

Lou and Cheryl break up when he learns she had an affair. Lou moves away, but when Cheryl writes to him, he returns to Erinsborough to try to mend the relationship. However, he is devastated to learn Cheryl has died after being hit by a car. Lou moves back to Ramsay Street to care for Louise and run the pub. Harold turns up alive and Madge decides to return to Ramsay Street. Lou opens a restaurant and goes into partnership with Ben Atkins (Brett Cousins) at a garage, which is named Carpenters Mechanics. Ben leaves and Lou hires Drew Kirk (Dan Paris). Lou decides to sell up and retire when he has a heart attack, but he changes his mind. Lou briefly dates Carol Maitland (Helen Trenos), but realises he is not over Cheryl. Lou buys Number 30 as an investment, but angers the tenants – Toadfish Rebecchi, Sarah Beaumont (Nicola Charles) and Joel Samuels (Daniel MacPherson) – by putting up the rent. Lou falls in love with Merridy Jackson (Suzi Cato) and becomes addicted to painkillers, following back surgery. Madge dies from cancer and Lou turns to the painkillers to numb his grief. He later gets help for his addiction and attends Narcotics Anonymous.

Lou is shocked when John Allen (Adrian Mulraney) claims to have had an affair with Cheryl and fathered Louise. Lou has a DNA test done, but the results confirmed John is Louise's father, devastating Lou. Following a custody hearing, John is given full custody of Louise, with Lou getting visitation rights. Lou and Harold compete for the affections of Rosie Hoyland and move in together. Rosie admits she would like to pursue a relationship with Lou and they begin dating. Lou and Rosie later break up and decide to remain friends. Lou develops kidney failure and Harold offers to donate one of his kidneys to him. Lou initially rejects the offer, but later changes his mind. Lou becomes friends with Valda Sheergold (Joan Sydney) and employs her at the pub. Lou develops feeling for Valda, but nothing happens as Valda leaves town. Max Hoyland (Stephen Lovatt) becomes a partner in the pub and Lou meets and marries Trixie Tucker (Wendy Stapleton). Lou invests in a production of Hello Dolly for Trixie, but the show is cancelled due to poor ticket sales and Lou loses his money and his wife. Lou gets into debt to Rocco Cammeniti (Robert Forza) and decides to flee town. His car breaks down in the bush and he almost dies after slipping down a slope, but he is rescued.

Lou sells his properties and begins fixing horse races for Rocco. He is arrested and sent to prison, but is later released following an appeal led by Toadie. Lou goes into business with Harold and they open the General Store. He also meets Mishka Schneiderova (Deborah Kennedy) online and when she comes to Australia, they enter into a relationship. Mishka is later forced to leave the country by immigration officers. Louise (now played by Adelaide Kane) comes to stay with Lou and admits her stepmother has been abusing her. The situation is sorted out and Louise returns to John. Harold decides to leave and invites Lou to go travelling with him; Lou declines and he moves in with the Parker family, becoming a grandfather figure to Mickey Gannon. Lou sells the General Store to Marco Silvani (Jesse Rosenfeld) and Frazer Yeats (Ben Lawson), who keep him on as an employee. Frazer goes to Italy and Marco dies, leaving the store in the hands of Carmella Cammeniti (Natalie Blair) and Lou. Harold returns and is diagnosed with cancer; he also suffers a heart attack. Lou helps his friend through the recovery process and joins him on his journey to Queensland.

A few months later, Lou returns and becomes the guardian of Kate Ramsay (Ashleigh Brewer) and her siblings, Harry (Will Moore) and Sophie (Kaiya Jones). Lou tries internet dating and almost goes on a date with Lyn Scully (Janet Andrewartha). Kate tries to get Lou and Terry Kearney (Peter Moon) to be friends, but when they meet, they instantly dislike each other. Lou plays mediator when a feud occurs between the Kennedy and Scully families. He decides to purchase the car yard next to Carpenter's Mechanics and uses Karl Kennedy's pet galah, Dahl, in his advertisements. Karl and Lou then begin competing with each other for Dahl and Karl wins his pet back. Lou, Kate and Sophie invite Lucas Fitzgerald (Scott Major) to move in. Lou wins the Citizen of the Year Award after competing against Karl and Susan (Jackie Woodburne). Lou hires Kyle Canning (Chris Milligan) at the car yard, but when Kyle realises Lou does not trust him to close a sale, he quits. Lou apologises and gives Kyle a pay rise. Harold returns with his fiancée, Carolyn (Paula Duncan). Lou initially thinks Carolyn is stuck up, especially when she disagrees with his idea for Harold's buck's night. Harold manages to get them to compromise on a joint party and Lou tells Susan he would like to meet someone.

After losing out to Lou during a car selling competition, Kyle quits his job again. Harold and Carolyn become concerned with Lou's workload, but he assures them he is fine. Lou collapses and is told that he suffered an electrolyte imbalance. Harold tells Lou to start taking his health seriously and Lou confesses that he cannot give up work as he is broke. Lou decides to sell the car yard stock and invests in Kyle's handyman business. Lou leaves for East Timor to help build schools for children. On his return, Lou notices there is tension between Kate and Sophie. Kate tells him Sophie has a crush on an older boy and has been acting out. When Toadie reveals a development company wants to buy out Dial-A-Kyle, Lou decides to accept the offer. Lucas tells Lou he will not be accepting the offer for his garage and Lou urges him to change his mind, as he has just purchased a cruise. Lou asks Rhys Lawson (Ben Barber) to give him a check-up to see if he has a medical condition that will get him out of the contract for the cruise. However, Rhys cannot find anything wrong and refuses to lie. A few weeks later, Lou returns from his cruise and reveals he hurt his neck playing shuffleboard, However, Lucas learns he is lying to claim compensation. Lou tries to convince an insurance assessor that his injury is real, but Toadie ruins his scam.

Lou decides to help Kyle out with the business accounts and he takes $8000 from Kyle. Kate discovers what Lou has done and she decides to keep the truth from Kyle, while Lou looks for a part-time job to pay him back. Lou meets Vera Munro (Marie-Therese Byrne), a rich widow, who invites him to accompany her to a wedding. Lou later tells Vera that he lost his wallet and his rent money, so she offers to replace it. However, Sheila Canning (Colette Mann) reveals that Lou still has his wallet and he is forced to give the money back. Vera then explains that she would have been happy to pay for his company. Lou then decides to become a male escort and accompanies Dawn Ballantyne (Marita Wilcox) to England for two months. Upon his return, Lou finds the Kapoor family have moved into Number 24. Feeling guilty, Lou tells Kyle about taking his money. Kyle forgives Lou, but Sheila has a go at him for ripping off her grandson. Vanessa Villante (Alin Sumarwata) offers Lou a room at Number 32 and he decides to sell his share of Dial-A-Kyle. He tries to find himself a hobby and takes up painting. He submits a piece to an exhibition at the community centre, but is disappointed when he does not win a prize.

Lou's daughter, Lauren, and her family move to Erinsborough. Lou tries to keep his poor financial situation from them, but Sheila tells Lauren, who forgives Lou for keeping it from her. Lou interrupts a break in at Number 32 and the robber pushes Lou to the ground during his escape. Lou learns that his grandson, Mason, was in juvenile detention for breaking and entering and is unhappy that his family have been trying to keep it from him. Lou continues to support his family when things get worse for them and Mason is arrested. When Lou injures his back, Sheila takes care of him and encourages him to get in contact with Ling Mai. Lou is delighted to learn that his daughter wants to see him and he goes to Cambodia. When he returns he reveals that Sheila has been sending him messages on his blog and believes she fancies him. He prepares to let her down gently, but Bailey admits to sending the messages. As Lou approaches his 70th birthday, he realises that none of his male relatives have lived over 70 and believes that he may die. He panics and asks Karl for a check-up. During his birthday party, Lou is delighted to see Lolly. He also learns that his 70th birthday actually occurred the year before. Lou briefly leaves to spend sometime with Lolly.

On his return, Lou starts working with Lauren at Harold's. Lou is surprised when his ex-wife, Kathy, comes to visit Lauren. After they clash, Bailey gets Lou and Kathy to sit down and clear the air. Soon after, Lou learns that Lauren gave birth to Brad Willis's (Kip Gamblin) daughter twenty years ago, but Kathy adopted her out behind her back. Lou is shocked and tries to force Kathy out of Erinsborough for what she has done. Lauren and Brad decide to search for their long-lost daughter and Lou supports Lauren, who struggles with the emotional strain of the search. Lou is delighted when his old friend Doug Willis (Terence Donovan) returns to Erinsborough and they make ginger beer together and run Dial-A-Kyle, while Kyle is away. When Doug, who is suffering from the early stages of Alzheimer's, mixes up an order costing the business money, he blames Lou, but the mistake is later rectified. After returning home from Cambodia, Lou learns that Lauren found her daughter, Paige (Olympia Valance), and he introduces himself to her. Lou agrees to say that he wrote Karl's erotic novel, to take the pressure off him, and he is interviewed by a journalist.

When a tornado hits Erinsborough, Lou waits it out in Harold's Store with Susan. When the roof collapses, Lou is trapped by a beam and he chokes on a piece of food. Susan is forced to perform an emergency tracheotomy on Lou when he falls unconscious. Lou begins breathing again and he is rushed to hospital. Lou spends time with Bailey's girlfriend Alice's (Vivienne Awosoga) grandmother, Leyla (Carolyn Shakespeare-Allen), as a result of his success with Karl's erotic novel. When their relationship gets too intense, he goes to Cambodia ahead of schedule. When Lou returns he begins a feud with Sheila after he poaches her new barman. They try to sabotage each other's businesses until Lauren intervenes and tells them Harold's Store and The Waterhole will team up for the upcoming Erinsborough Festival. Harold returns for Amber and Daniel's (Tim Phillipps) wedding, and he suspects Lou has feelings for Sheila, which Lou denies. Lou's stepdaughter Nina Tucker (Delta Goodrem) also returns to Erinsborough and Lou encourages her to sing at the festival's closing concert. Lou supports Lauren and the children when Matt is killed in a hit-and-run accident. Karl, Toadie, Lou, Kyle and Nate (Meyne Wyatt) form a cycling group, but Lou slows the others down and they ask him to drop out. Bailey starts drinking and when Lou tries to confront him, he pushes him into the kitchen counter. He later tells Lou that he wants to get away from the sadness in the house and Lou asks him to move to Queensland with him, so they can be closer to Kathy and Guy. Lou tells Lauren that he will be back to visit her, and he and Bailey leave after a farewell party.

A few months later, Lou returns after going on the run from drug dealers in Cambodia. He hides out at Number 32, while Stanley Neve (Alex Pinder) follows him to Erinsborough. After Lou receives a smashed Buddha statue in the post, he believes his life is under threat. He decides to fake his own death, but when Sheila delivers an unflattering eulogy, Lou reveals himself. Stanley then explains that Lou had an affair with his wife, so he planted baking powder in his bag in the hope that he would get stopped at customs. Stanley also explains that there is no drug cartel and that his wife, Rochelle (Carmen Warrington), is on her way to Erinsborough to be with Lou. Lou is horrified, as he did not intend his affair with Rochelle to lead to a fully-fledged relationship, and tries to trick her into thinking he is also involved with Sheila. Rochelle sees through this and breaks up with him. When Amber and her daughter Matilda (Eloise Simbert) move to Queensland, Lou returns with them. Lou helps Doug complete a bucket list with Karl's help. He also considers trekking the Kokoda Track, but his family talk him out of it. He then decides to return to Cambodia.

Lou returns to Erinsborough shortly after Kathy. They are initially hostile towards one another and Kathy reveals that they had a one-night stand. Lou explains to Brad that they had been getting on well, so he was surprised when Kathy ordered him to leave the room straight after. They soon learn that they have their wires crossed and Kathy was speaking to the cat. Kathy decides that they should not get back together and returns to Brisbane. Lou begins looking for a date to Lauren's wedding and he manages to scare off Lauren's wedding caterer with his advances. Lou begins thinking about his past relationships, and he meets with Trixie to see if there is a chance of a reconciliation, but she leaves when Sheila tells her Lou is on the rebound. At Lauren and Brad's wedding, Lou and Kathy realise that they still have feelings for each other and they hold a small ceremonial vow renewal. They then leave Erinsborough in Lauren and Brad's wedding camper van.

== Reception ==
In 2007, Oliver was nominated for "Funniest Performance" at the Inside Soap Awards. Oliver was nominated for the same award the following year. In 2009, Lou came third in a poll by British men's magazine Loaded for "Top Soap Bloke". The BBC said Lou's most notable moment was "Looking after Lolly after the death of Cheryl, then losing her after discovering that he wasn't her natural father." While Holy Soap said Lou's relationship with Annalise Hartman (Kimberley Davies) was his most memorable moment. Diana Hollingsworth of Soaplife included Lou in her feature on wide boys and she said "Not so much a wideboy as a widepensioner, 'Honest' Lou has tried many ways to earn a crust, including selling cars and running his own radio show. He's got more fingers in more pies than Little Jack Horner."

In 2010, to celebrate Neighbours' 25th anniversary British satellite broadcasting company Sky profiled twenty-five characters who they believed were the most memorable in the show's history. Lou is included in the list and Sky said "Lou and Paul are the last remaining links back to proper old school Neighbours (unless Rosemary Daniels, the Belinda Slater of Ramsay Street, makes another appearance), and strangely are both most memorable for working in 'business'. Whether running Chez Chez with awesome wife Cheryl or bickering at the Coffee Shop with fellow soap elder statesman Harold, you can count on Lou to cast his twinkly eye over proceedings and let out a dirty laugh." They also describe his most memorable moments over his duration as being: "Chasing childhood sweetheart Madge; his brief yet oft-referred-to time as mayor; discovering Lolly wasn't his daughter." Lou was placed at number seventeen on the Huffpost's "35 greatest Neighbours characters of all time" feature. Journalist Adam Beresford described him as a "loveable rogue" with "twinkly eyes and that dirty laugh" and he was never "averse to a dodgy deal". Beresford was fond of his "most enduring" partnership with Harold, adding "their odd couple double act gave us plenty of laughs."
