= Lolly Allen =

- Neighbours character
- Jiordan Tolli as Lolly Allen (2013)
- Portrayed by: Tessa Taylor (1994); Jiordan Tolli (1994–2001, 2013); Adelaide Kane (2007)
- Duration: 1994–2001, 2007, 2013
- First appearance: 25 July 1994
- Last appearance: 4 October 2013
- Introduced by: Ian Bradley (1994); Ric Pellizzeri (2007); Richard Jasek (2013)
- Adelaide Kane as Lolly (2007)
In-universe information
- Occupation: Student
- Father: John Allen
- Mother: Cheryl Stark
- Adoptive father: Lou Carpenter
- Stepmother: Sandy Allen
- Half-brothers: Darren Stark; Brett Stark; Brandon Allen; Guy Carpenter (adoptive)
- Half-sisters: Janine Stark; Danni Stark; Keisha Allen; Lauren Carpenter (adoptive); Ling Mai Chan (adoptive)
- Grandfathers: Hector Kratz
- Grandmothers: Marlene Kratz
- Uncles: Patrick Kratz
- First cousins: Sam Kratz

Shannon Louise "Lolly" Allen (also Carpenter) is a fictional character from the Australian soap opera Neighbours. She made her first screen appearance during the episode broadcast on 25 July 1994. Louise was played by Tessa Taylor from her birth, with Jiordan Tolli taking over the role a few months later. The character was written out in 2001 when Tolli's parents and the producers felt it was the right time for her to leave. In 2006, it was announced that Louise would be returning to Neighbours and Adelaide Kane was cast in the role, after winning the Dolly "Neighbours Next Big Stars" competition. Kane's contract was not renewed and Louise departed on 29 June 2007. The character returned for one episode on 4 October 2013 with Tolli in the role.

== Casting ==
Tessa Taylor was the first actress to play Louise. Jiordan Tolli was cast as Louise when she was two months old, following a call from casting director Jan Russ for a baby to play the role of Lou Carpenter (Tom Oliver) and Cheryl Stark's (Caroline Gillmer) young daughter. When Tolli was two years old, Gillmer's character was written out, leaving Tolli and Oliver to work together. In 2001, it was announced that Tolli and her character would be leaving Neighbours after seven years. Of Tolli's departure, her mother said "It was very sad to see Jiordy leave, but it's the right time. The producers, my husband Luke and I were all thinking the same way."

In 2006, teen magazine, Dolly and Neighbours launched a competition to find a girl aged between 12 and 16 and a boy aged between 15 and 18 to join the cast. Out of 7000 entries, Adelaide Kane and Sam Clark were picked to join the cast as Louise and Ringo Brown on 4 August 2006. They were both handed a three-month contract with the show. On her win Kane said "I got a call in the middle of school from my mum, and she was like, 'Someone called about Neighbours.' And I was like, 'Someone called about our neighbours? The American couple who live next door?' And she was like, 'No, no! The Neighbours competition!'". Kane had to move to Melbourne with her mum acting as a chaperone, for filming. In December 2006, it was announced that Kane would be leaving the show after her contract was not renewed. At the time of the announcement, Kane had not yet appeared as Louise on Australian screens.

== Development ==
Lolly is the biological daughter of Cheryl Stark (Caroline Gillmer). She was raised by Lou Carpenter (Tom Oliver) after Cheryl died when Lolly was two years old. When John Allen (Adrian Mulraney) came forward and revealed that he was Lolly's real father, he and his wife took custody of her and she left with them. Lolly was described as being "sweet" when she was younger. However, when she returned in 2007, her personality had changed and she became a "rebellious teenager." Network Ten described her as "attention seeking" and a "troubled soul", who is good at lying.

Pepper Steiger (Nicky Whelan) discovers a large bruise on Lolly and she is convinced that Lolly is being abused. Her fears are correct and it is revealed that Lolly is being abused by her stepmother, Sandy (Catherine Hill). When Pepper confronts Lolly and tries to get her to talk about what it happening, Lolly accuses Pepper of being violent towards her instead. Pepper is suspended from her job, but Lolly later confesses that she lied. When Sandy arrives in Ramsay Street for a visit, Lolly decides that she cannot live with the abuse anymore and sabotages the brakes on, what she believes to be Sandy's car. Kane said "It's got to the point where Lolly can't live like this anymore, and this is Lolly's way of dealing with what's been happening. Trying to sabotage her car is a way that Lolly can avoid directly confronting Sandy and actually coming face to face with her because she's so terrified of this horrible woman." Lolly's plan fails and she and Sandy have a confrontation by a swimming pool. Sandy becomes aggressive and when she goes to hit Lolly, Lolly pushes her into the pool, where she hits her head. Lolly eventually jumps in and saves Sandy and confesses everything to Lou.

In August 2013, it was confirmed that Lolly would be returning to Neighbours with Tolli in the role. The character made a one-off appearance to celebrate Lou's 70th birthday. Of her return, Tolli commented "I spent a big part of my childhood on the show so it felt very comfortable coming back to the studios to film the episode." Lolly returned on 4 October 2013.

== Storylines ==
Louise is born on the same day as Zac Willis (Jay Callahan). Their respective mothers Cheryl and Gaby (Rachel Blakely) want to name them both Shannon but decide to call the children by their middle names. When Lolly is two, she runs into the road and Cheryl is hit by an oncoming car trying to save her and is killed as a result, leaving Lou to bring her up alone. When Michelle Scully (Kate Keltie) babysits Lolly, she leaves her unattended to enjoy the street's Millennium celebrations. Lolly discovers some matches and leftover fireworks and sets the house on fire. Drew Kirk (Dan Paris) risks his life to save her. Lolly causes more drama when she falls into the pool at Number 30 and nearly drowns. She is then saved by Darcy Tyler (Mark Raffety). Lou receives a letter from John Allen telling him of his affair with Cheryl, resulting in Lolly's conception. Lou agrees to do a paternity test and the result is negative. Lou then surrenders custody to the Allens and Lolly leaves, but they keep in touch.

Lolly returns to Erinsborough to see Lou in six years later, now fifteen years old, and begins stealing and lying as a way to get attention. She reveals her stepmother, John's wife, Sandy, has been physically abusing her. When Lou finds out, he throws Sandy out of his house, threatening to tell the police about the abuse. It is later mentioned that John and Sandy are separating. Lolly develops feelings for Ringo Brown, who is dating Rachel Kinski (Caitlin Stasey), was unaware, and comes to think of Lolly like a sister.

Lolly dates Rachel's brother Zeke (Matthew Werkmeister). However, soon after this she begins missing her siblings, and confides in Bree Timmins (Sianoa Smit-McPhee) that she wants to leave Ramsay Street to go back to her biological family. Lou and Zeke both realise Lolly's feelings, but try to keep her in Erinsborough by using emotional blackmail. However, both Bree and Harold Bishop (Ian Smith) makes them see sense, and Lou buys himself and Lolly two plane tickets to Moscow to visit Lou's girlfriend, Mishka Schneiderova (Deborah Kennedy), before Lolly returns to her other family in Adelaide. Six years later, Lauren Carpenter (Kate Kendall) invites Lolly to Erinsborough to help celebrate Lou's 70th birthday.

== Reception ==
For her portrayal of Lolly, Kane was nominated for the Most Popular New Female Talent Logie Award in 2008. A writer for the BBC said Lolly's most notable moment was "Being caught in a burning house." Of Lolly's 2007 return, Roz Laws, writing for the Sunday Mercury, commented "A familiar face returns to Ramsay Street, although you may not recognise it. Lolly Allen is back after a gap of six years with her adoptive dad Lou, and she's all grown up." Law added that Lolly was "still causing trouble". A Daily Post reporter observed "her seemingly sweet nature doesn't last long when she starts to reveal her true colours."
