= Cheryl Stark =

Fictional character

- Neighbours character
- Caroline Gillmer as Cheryl Stark (1995)
- Portrayed by: Caroline Gillmer (1993–1996); Colette Mann (1995–1996)
- Duration: 1993–1996
- First appearance: 26 July 1993
- Last appearance: 30 September 1996
- Introduced by: Alan Coleman
- Colette Mann as Cheryl Stark
In-universe information
- Occupation: The Robinson Corporation manager Bar manager and owner
- Father: Hector Kratz
- Mother: Marlene Kratz
- Brothers: Patrick Kratz
- Husband: Maurie Stark (backstory)
- Sons: Darren Stark; Brett Stark
- Daughters: Janine Stark; Danni Stark; Lolly Allen
- Nephews: Sam Kratz

Cheryl Stark is a fictional character from the Australian television soap opera Neighbours, played by Caroline Gillmer. She made her first appearance during the episode broadcast on 26 July 1993. Colette Mann took over the role for eight weeks from late 1995 to early 1996 when Gillmer fell ill. In September 1996, Gillmer departed the show and Cheryl was killed off.

== Creation and casting ==
The character of Cheryl was created in 1993 as the head of the new Stark family. She was given an immediate link to already existing character and son Darren Stark (Scott Major). Actress Caroline Gillmer successfully auditioned for the role. Debuting on-screen, Cheryl moved into Ramsay Street with daughter Danni (Eliza Szonert), and son Brett (Brett Blewitt), both new additions to the serial's cast. In an interview with Raymond Gill of The Age, Gillmer admitted that she wanted to break the stereotype of being cast as a "mother earth" character with many children. When Gill pointed out that Cheryl was a housewife, Gillmer told him that there was a twist with her character and explained that she wanted Cheryl to be a role model to women who were "trapped in the suburbs", as Cheryl wins the lottery and lives the life she wants. She said, "I hope this can tell women that they can take control of their lives."

In 1995, Gillmer fell ill during a time Cheryl was written to be a central figure in key storylines. Producers felt they had no alternative but to temporarily recast her with former Prisoner actress Colette Mann. This made producers nervous that viewing figures might decrease, so they implemented a series of plots to keep viewers interested. Mann took over the role for eight weeks. She revealed that she was hired on a Friday and started filming on the following Monday. She added "I walked in, and Brett Blewitt said, 'Hello, I'm your son!'. And then it was, 'Action!'"

Gillmer chose to leave the show after winning a green card to work in the United States. She also wanted to capitalise on the success of feature film Hotel Sorrento, in which she appears. Producers chose to kill off Gillmer's character, a development that the actress welcomed. She explained, "I was very flattered that they decided to kill Cheryl off. It's a sign of the popularity of Cheryl, as it's only really the characters that the public care about that they kill off. If the producers had just decided to send Cheryl to Queensland, then that would have been a bit of a worry!" Cheryl's exit storyline aired in late September 1996. She is fatally injured after being struck by a car while saving her daughter Lousie Carpenter (Jiordan Tolli), who wanders into the road after spotting a dog. Local doctor and Cheryl's neighbour Karl Kennedy (Alan Fletcher) attempts to administer first aid and save Cheryl, but his efforts are in vain and she dies in front of Danni, who arrives at the scene. Gillmer called her character's death "a real tragedy" and said there would be "a variety of reactions from Cheryl's family and friends that are all very sad." She also admitted that she did not think she would ever forget Cheryl, calling her "a great character to play".

== Storylines ==
When Lou Carpenter (Tom Oliver) leaves his wallet behind at The Manhattan bar, owner Cheryl is immediately attracted to him and begins pursuing him. Lou is resistant at first but then gives in. Around this time, Cheryl's elder son Darren is released from juvenile detention and comes to stay with Cheryl, who is renting Number 22 Ramsay Street. Darren convinces her he has turned over a new leaf, but he uses his release to drag his cellmate Michael Martin's (Troy Beckwith) sister Debbie (Marnie Reece-Wilmore) into a life of crime. Darren's scheme is eventually foiled and he is jailed, prompting Cheryl to wash her hands of him. Shortly after ending her relationship with Lou, Cheryl goes on a world cruise.

When Cheryl returns, she is joined by her children Brett and Danni who have run away from boarding school. Cheryl, used to her independence, is not keen to have them living with her, but eventually relents on the advice of Lou and agrees to enrol Brett and Danni at Erinsborough High. Cheryl and Lou rekindle their relationship in secret, but when it is revealed, Brett accepts it while Danni is less than welcoming about it. However, Danni comes to respect Lou in time.

Lou and Cheryl agree to live together but cannot decide on the venue. Cheryl then agrees for her and her kids to move in with Lou, his daughter Lauren (Sarah Vandenberg) and lodger Rick Alessi (Dan Falzon). Cheryl later discovers she is pregnant and worries about the complications of being an older mother. Lou proposes and Cheryl accepts; however, they agree to continue cohabiting. While arguing with Michael's stepmother, Julie (Julie Mullins), about Michael and Danni's relationship, Cheryl is knocked down when Julie accidentally reverses her car into her, putting the baby in danger.

Cheryl is allowed out of hospital for a day visit, and comes face to face with her mother Marlene Kratz (Moya O'Sullivan) for the first time in 30 years. Cheryl resents Marlene for leaving her and her brother Patrick (Shane Porteous) to be raised by their father, Hector. She learns that Marlene has purchased Number 24 from Madge Bishop (Anne Charleston). The meeting between the two women is frosty to begin with, but Annalise Hartman (Kimberley Davies) convinces Cheryl to make up with Marlene, as she never had the chance to make up with her mother, Fiona (Suzanne Dudley), before she died.

Cheryl gives birth to a daughter and decides to call her Shannon, but neighbour Gaby Willis (Rachel Blakely) has the same idea to use the name for her son born on the same day. Both women, however, opt to call their children by their middle names, Louise and Zac, respectively. Louise initially suffers breathing complications after her birth.

When Lou begins acting suspiciously by arriving home late from work and making secret phone calls, Cheryl decides to follow him. One day, she spots him kissing a young Asian woman and later confronts him about it. Lou reveals that the woman is his daughter Ling Mai Chan (Khym Lam). Cheryl struggles to adjust to the new woman in his life and almost ends her relationship with Lou. However, she grows to accept Ling Mai in time.

Cheryl's next biggest challenge is her clash with Brett over his plans to go sailing around the world after finishing Year 12. This culminates in Brett having an affair with one of Cheryl's friends, Judy Bergman (Merridy Eastman). Bret later leaves Erinsborough without saying goodbye to Cheryl and she is hurt. Cheryl later flies out to Cairns to say goodbye.

Upon hearing news that Brett has been arrested on suspicion of drug smuggling in Ecuador, Cheryl takes a flight there to bail him out. En route to meeting Max Geppert, Brett's travel companion, Cheryl is kidnapped by rebels and held hostage. Lou goes to Ecuador after Cheryl is released and brings her home. When Cheryl returns, she is distant and has adopted a change of image: less jewellery and a shorter hairstyle. When Lou talks to her about her experiences, Cheryl reveals she had an affair with one of her fellow captives. The couple then separate and Lou moves up North to be near Lauren.

After putting Number 22 up for sale, Cheryl and Louise then move in with Marlene and they are joined by Darren (now played by Todd MacDonald) upon his release from prison. Darren's struggle to remain on the straight and narrow is testing for Cheryl and she is soon feuding with Karl Kennedy (Alan Fletcher) when Darren begins dating his daughter, Libby (Kym Valentine).

While out walking with Louise, Cheryl spots Karl and stops to talk to him about Darren and Libby's relationship. Louise climbs out of her buggy when she spots a dog and wanders into the road. Cheryl goes to get her, but is hit by an oncoming car. Karl tries desperately to save Cheryl and is urged by Danni, who arrives on the scene, to give Cheryl something to ease her pain. Karl injects Cheryl with morphine but she dies before the ambulance arrives. It is later revealed that the morphine reacted with anti-depressants that Cheryl had been taking but she would have died of her injuries regardless.

Almost a week later, Lou returns in the hope of reconciling with Cheryl, having received a letter from her. However, he soon learns she has died and he is forced to raise Louise on his own. Five years later, a man named John Allen (Adrian Mulraney) appears after sending Lou a letter claiming that Louise is his daughter from an affair he had with Cheryl. After a DNA test proves that John is Louise's father, the court award custody to him, leaving Lou heartbroken. John, however, grants Lou visitation rights.

== Reception ==
A writer for the BBC's Neighbours website said Cheryl's most notable moment was "[c]onfessing that she had an affair with one of the hostages she was kidnapped with". In 1996, Network Ten cut five seconds from the episode in which Cheryl dies while saving her daughter. The following year, the BBC were also forced to censor scenes showing the moment Cheryl is hit by the vehicle. Cheryl was placed at number twenty-one on the Huffpost's "35 greatest Neighbours characters of all time" feature. Journalist Adam Beresford described "fiery redhead" Cheryl as the "proud owner of the most magnificent barnet to ever grace Erinsborough." He called her a "strong, passionate woman" whose death was a "sad end for a larger than life character". In 2005, a writer from Inside Soap called Cheryl "the most gaudily dressed woman in the Southern Hemisphere".
