= Jan Russ =

Australian casting director and actor

- Born: Maribyrnong, Melbourne, Victoria, Australia
- Occupations: Casting director, producer, actor
- Children: 2 (including Sam Hammington)

Jan Russ is an Australian casting director, producer and actress of theatre and television. She is best known as the casting director for various programs for Grundy Television/Fremantle Media, and is notable for launching the careers of many actors that became international stars.

Russ served as casting director on the television soap opera Neighbours from the show's inception in 1984 to her departure in 2009. She previously worked at Crawford Productions and served as the casting director for Prisoner until the show's cancellation.

== Early and personal life ==
Russ was born in Maribyrnong, a suburb northwest of Melbourne, Victoria and was a member of the Maribyrnong Youth Club when she was younger. In 1956, Russ, along with her drama group, won the Victorian Association of Youth Club's drama championship. Russ played Alice in an adaptation of Lewis Carroll's Through the Looking-Glass.

She started working in professional theatre shows from 1967 onwards. She appeared in productions of Man of La Mancha, Oliver!, Fiddler on the Roof, Godspell, The New Adventure of Pinocchio and Funny Girl. Russ lived in New Zealand while she worked in musical theatre and appeared on television shows. She later decided to move behind the camera and worked as a production assistant and floor manager, which made her the first female in the industry to do so.

During the 1960s, Russ gave birth to a daughter. She was forced to give the child up for adoption as she was young and unwed. Russ's story was later turned into a play, The Show Must Go On, which was written by Robyn Bishop and directed by Mike Bishop. Russ has a son, Samuel Hammington, who is an actor and comedian active in South Korea.

In September 2014, Russ was featured in The Past Is A Foreign Country, a two part episode of the ABC documentary series Australian Story.

== Casting career ==
When Russ moved back to Australia, she began working as the casting assistant for Crawford Productions. After 18 months, she was offered the job of casting director at Grundy Television for their television drama Prisoner. She continued working on the show until its cancellation. During this time Russ was contacted by Reg Watson, who explained that he was working on a new drama series and wanted her to make a list of actors to look at. She subsequently received a number of scripts under the working title Living Together and after reading them went to work assembling a cast. Russ wanted a mix of new talent and experienced but not as well known actors, believing viewers would find it harder to engage with their characters if they were too well known. The new show, now titled Neighbours, was commissioned by Seven Network in 1984 and launched in early 1985, with a mix of seasoned veteran actors alongside several newcomers. Russ stated that while watching the cast socialise together, she and producer John Holmes realised they had made a mistake with the actor who had been cast as Jim Robinson. They then asked Watson to release actor Alan Dale, who was appearing in Possession at the time, so he could play Jim.

Russ would go on to serve as casting director for the serial for almost 30 years. She is credited not only for casting "seasoned performers", including Ian Smith, Anne Charleston, Tom Oliver, Jackie Woodburne, Alan Fletcher, but for "discovering" and casting many upcoming younger actors, who have gone on to forge international careers, such as Kylie Minogue and Jason Donovan in their famous roles of Charlene Mitchell and Scott Robinson, Guy Pearce, Daniel MacPherson, Delta Goodrem, Natalie Imbruglia and Jesse Spencer, Craig McLachlan, Holly Valance, Madeleine West, and Brooke Satchwell. Russ' casting talent has led her to be called "Australia's most enduring star-maker", and she later became a Neighbours associate producer.

In 2006, Russ was responsible for choosing the winners of Dolly magazine's search for Neighbours' next big stars competition. She had to go through seven thousand taped entries over several weeks, before starting live auditions. Adelaide Kane (Lolly Allen) and Sam Clark (Ringo Brown) were eventually chosen and given a three-month contract with the show. The Dolly competition ran again in 2008 and Russ handpicked Mauricio Merino Jr. and Chelsea Jones to star as Simon and Tegan Freeman, respectively.

In March 2009, Russ' future with Neighbours was called into question following a backstage "shakeup". It was announced that FremantleMedia, the series production company, was planning to bring in an external casting agency. Fremantle's spokesman said "The casting role is critical to the show, it is an enormous job and it continues to grow by the day. We continue to discuss with Jan her role with the show, as her skill and talents are incredible". Two months later, it was announced that Russ was in discussions about her future with the show and about her involvement in the Dolly magazine competition and the 25th Anniversary. However, Russ was told by the then-producers that she was being let go and was being given her four weeks notice. Russ told David Knox of TV Tonight: "So I just sat there for a month, absolutely devastated. Totally devastated. I couldn't believe that after 26 years that's what I was given. I think they probably felt 'She's a bit old now, we want young blood.' But you can't replace experience and knowledge." Russ worked as casting director for Grundy Television, and its successor FremantleMedia for a total of twenty-five years.

In 2010, it was announced that Russ would be casting a new television project, created and developed by the McMahon Entertainment Group.

In June 2026, Russ released her autobiography What Will the Neighbours Think? through Big Sky Publishing and Simon & Schuster.

== Acting ==
Russ has had acting roles in Division 4, Homicide and The Clinic. Russ had a guest role as Mrs Daniels on Prisoner before she became the casting director.

Russ appeared at the Melbourne International Comedy Festival in 2009 and in September of that year, she made a guest appearance in City Homicide alongside Daniel MacPherson, whom she cast in Neighbours in 1998. Russ had not performed on television since Prisoner in 1982. Her character was Robyn Turner, a community volunteer. Russ said she received an email from the City Homicide casting team, which said there was a role they wanted to see her for and would she be interested in auditioning. Russ call her audition "bizarre" and "strange". Russ also teaches acting.
