= Different Kind of Love =

Single by Third Degree
- Released: 1 November 2013
- Recorded: 2013
- Genre: Pop, Hip Hop
- Length: 3:40
- Label: Sony
- Songwriters: Leon Else; Ben Berger; Ryan McMahon
- Producer: Captain Cuts

Third Degree singles chronology
"Different Kind of Love" (2013)	"Live the Life" (2014)

"Different Kind of Love" is the debut single by Third Degree who finished fourth on season five of The X Factor Australia. It was released digitally by Sony Music Australia on 1 November 2013.

== Background and release ==
"Different Kind of Love" was written by U.K singer/songwriter Leon Else with Ben Berger and Ryan McMahon of Los Angeles production duo Captain Cuts. It would have been Third Degree's winner's single for the fifth season of The X Factor, if they had won the show. However, they finished in fourth place. On 1 November 2013, it was announced that Third Degree had signed a recording contract with Sony Music Australia along with second and third place Taylor Henderson and Jai Waetford. "Different Kind of Love" was released digitally as their debut single later that day. A CD single was released on 8 November.

== Track listing ==
- CD / digital download
1. "Different Kind of Love" – 3:40

== Charts ==
Chart (2013)	Peak position
Australia (ARIA)	22

== Release history ==
Country	Date	Format	Label	Catalogue
Australia	1 November 2013	Digital download	Sony Music Australia	
Australia	8 November 2013	CD	Sony Music Australia	88843013192
