= The Clique (duo) =

Australian pop duo

- The Clique photoshoot to announce their new name in May 2014

Background information
- Also known as: Third Degree
- Genre: Pop
- Years active: 2013–2015
- Label: Sony (2013)
- Past members: Jacinta Gulisano; Jordan Rodrigues; Kelebek

The Clique were an Australian pop duo consisting of members Jacinta Gulisano and Jordan Rodrigues. They were formed in 2013 originally as the trio Third Degree, who competed in the fifth season of The X Factor Australia and were the ninth contestant eliminated. The group subsequently signed with Sony Music Australia and released their debut single "Different Kind of Love", which peaked at number 22 on the ARIA Singles Chart. Following the departure of Kelebek in 2014, Third Degree changed their name to The Clique and were no longer signed to Sony Music. The group disbanded in 2015 to pursue solo careers.

== History ==
=== 2013: Third Degree ===
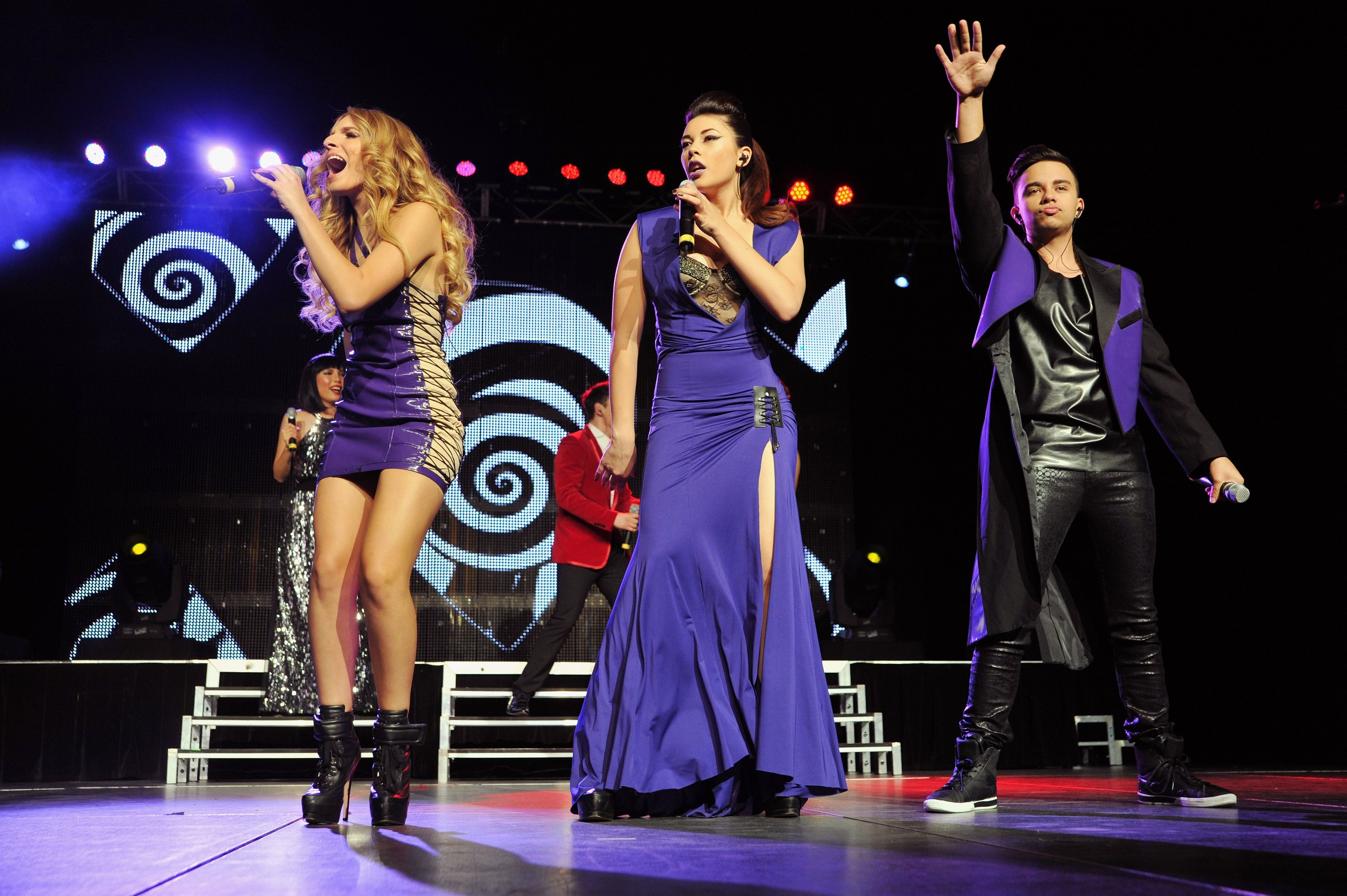
Third Degree performing during The X Factor Live Tour in November 2013

Third Degree was formed in 2013 on the fifth season of The X Factor Australia by judges Ronan Keating, Dannii Minogue and Redfoo. Their initial line-up included Kelebek, Jacinta Gulisano and Jordan Rodrigues. All three members originally auditioned on the show as solo contestants and progressed to the super bootcamp stage, where they got eliminated. However, the judges called them back to form a mixed group for the Groups category. All three members were notably unhappy at first about being put in a group, stating that it was an "odd trio". Third Degree entered in the third day of bootcamp, where they sang "No Diggity" by Blackstreet to the judges and a live audience of one thousand. They received a standing ovation, and subsequently progressed to the home visits stage. During home visits, Third Degree sang "Can't Hold Us" by Macklemore and Ryan Lewis in front of their mentor Natalie Bassingthwaighte and guest mentor Guy Sebastian. Bassingthwaighte later selected Third Degree, along with JTR and Adira-Belle, for the live finals—a series of ten weekly live shows in which contestants are progressively eliminated by public vote.

For the Judges' Choice-themed first live show, Third Degree sang "thatPower" by will.i.am and received positive feedback from the judges. In week six of the live shows, Third Degree fell into the bottom two alongside JTR but was saved after Keating, Minogue and Redfoo all opted to eliminate JTR. Following the eliminations of Adira-Belle and JTR, Third Degree became the only remaining act in the Groups category. In week eight of the live shows, Third Degree fell into the bottom two alongside Jiordan Tolli. The judges' vote went to deadlock, and Tolli was eliminated after it was revealed she received the fewest votes. In the semi-finals, Third Degree sang "Give Me Everything" by Pitbull and "Pound the Alarm" by Nicki Minaj, gaining positive reviews from the judges. Despite this, they fell into the bottom two alongside Taylor Henderson. The judges' vote went to deadlock, and Henderson advanced to the grand final after it was revealed he received the most public votes, leading to Third Degree being eliminated.

==== Performances on The X Factor ====
Show	Theme	Song	Original artist(s)	Order	Result
Super bootcamp 3	N/A	"No Diggity"	Blackstreet	N/A	Through to home visits
Home visits	Free choice	"Can't Hold Us"	Macklemore and Ryan Lewis	N/A	Through to live shows
Week 1	Judges' Choice	"thatPower"	will.i.am ft. Justin Bieber	1	Safe
Week 2	Legends	"Till the World Ends"	Britney Spears	10	Safe
Week 3	Top 10 Hits	"Wild"	Jessie J	1	Safe
Week 4	Latest and Greatest	"Love the Way You Lie"	Eminem ft. Rihanna	7	Safe
Week 5	Rock	"By the Way"	Red Hot Chili Peppers	2	Safe
Week 6	Family Heroes	"Smooth Criminal"	Michael Jackson	1	Bottom two
Week 6	Final Showdown	"Dedication to My Ex (Miss That)"	Lloyd	2	Saved
Week 7	Judges Challenge	"Pump It"	The Black Eyed Peas	6	Safe
Week 8	Aussie Hits	"Battle Scars"	Guy Sebastian and Lupe Fiasco	4	Bottom two (4th)
Week 8	Final Showdown	"Thrift Shop"	Macklemore and Ryan Lewis	2	Saved via deadlock
Semi-final	Power and Passion	"Give Me Everything"	Pitbull	1	Bottom two (4th)
Semi-final	Power and Passion	"Pound the Alarm"	Nicki Minaj	6	Bottom two (4th)
Semi-final	Final Showdown	"Crazy in Love"	Beyoncé	2	Eliminated (4th place)

After The X Factor ended, Third Degree received a recording contract with Sony Music Australia and released their debut single "Different Kind of Love" on 1 November 2013. "Different Kind of Love" debuted and peaked at number 22 on the ARIA Singles Chart. On 23 November 2013, Third Degree toured alongside Henderson, Tolli, Dami Im and Jai Waetford for The X Factor Live Tour, which ended on 2 December 2013. On 7 March 2014, it was announced that Kelebek had left the group to pursue a solo career, leaving Gulisano and Rodrigues as a duo.

=== 2014: The Clique ===
On 22 May 2014, Gulisano and Rodrigues announced in a video posted to their YouTube and Facebook accounts that they changed the group's name to The Clique. Their first song as The Clique, titled "Live the Life", was released independently on 12 June 2014.

The group disbanded in 2015 to pursue solo careers.

== Members ==
=== Jacinta Gulisano ===
Jacinta Gulisano, born 23 October 1993 (age 33), is from Sydney. She was a student at Aquinas College in Menai, New South Wales. In 2009, Gulisano was a semi-finalist in the third series of Australia's Got Talent, as a member of the singing trio Soundcheck. In 2013, it was revealed she had been dating Dance Academy actor Jordan Rodrigues. Gulisano auditioned for The X Factor singing "LaserLight" by Jessie J, and progressed to the super bootcamp stage of the competition. During bootcamp, she sang a mash-up of "Who's Lovin' You" by the Jackson 5 and "Telephone" by Lady Gaga. Prior to entering The X Factor, she was a vocal coach and a dance teacher. Gulisano cites Beyoncé, Jessie J, Michael Jackson and The Black Eyed Peas as her musical influences.

=== Jordan Rodrigues ===
Jordan Rodrigues, born 11 July 1995 (age 31), is from Melbourne. He auditioned for The X Factor singing "DJ Got Us Fallin' in Love" by Usher, and progressed to the super bootcamp stage. During bootcamp, Rodrigues sang "Lately" by Stevie Wonder. He cites Michael Jackson, Usher and Chris Brown as his musical influences.

=== Kelebek ===
Vanessa "Kelebek" Skrypczak, born 29 May 1995 (age 31), is from Albury, New South Wales. Kelebek is of Filipino and German descent. She previously auditioned for the fourth season of The X Factor, under her birth name Vanessa Skrypczak, and made it to the top 24. She auditioned for the fifth season singing "Good Feeling" by Flo Rida, and progressed to the super bootcamp stage. During bootcamp, Kelebek sang "Change Your Life" by Little Mix. Kelebek cites Michael Jackson, Eve, Beyoncé, Jessie J, Amy Winehouse, Missy Elliott, Slaughterhouse and The Black Eyed Peas as her musical influences.

On 7 March 2014, Third Degree's X Factor mentor Natalie Bassingthwaighte announced on her Twitter account that Kelebek had left the group. Kelebek stated that she wanted to re-pursue her solo career, saying: "I began as a soloist but it has been hard splitting from the group."

== Concert tours ==
Headlining

- The X Factor Live Tour (2013)

== Discography ==
=== Third Degree ===
==== Singles ====
Title	Year	Peak chart positions	Album
Title	Year	AUS	Album
"Different Kind of Love"	2013	22	—N/a

==== Other charted songs ====
Title	Year	Peak chart positions	Album
Title	Year	AUS	Album
"Pump It"	2013	84	—N/a
"Pound the Alarm"	2013	96	—N/a

=== The Clique ===
==== Singles ====
Title	Year	Peak chart positions	Album
Title	Year	AUS	Album
"Live the Life"	2014	—	TBA
"—" denotes items which failed to chart.

== Awards and nominations ==
Year	Type	Award	Result
2013	Poprepublic.tv Awards	Favourite Australian Group	Nominated
2013	Poprepublic.tv Awards	Breakthrough Artist of 2013	Nominated
