= Colette Mann =

Australian actress (born 1950)

- Born: 17 February 1950 (age 76); Melbourne, Victoria, Australia
- Education: Monash University (1967–1970)
- Occupations: Actress; singer; radio presenter; television presenter; choreographer; writer; media personality
- Years active: 1971–present
- Known for: Prisoner as Doreen May Anderson Burns; Neighbours as Sheila Canning
- Notable work: Neighbours as Cheryl Stark (fill-in for Caroline Gillmer)
- Children: 2

Colette Mann (born 17 February 1950) is an Australian actress, singer, TV and radio presenter, choreographer, writer and media personality, who has been in the entertainment industry for over 50 years. She is known for her roles in Prisoner (1979–1984) as Doreen May Anderson Burns, and Neighbours (2012–2022) as Sheila Canning.

== Early life and education ==
Mann was born in Melbourne, Victoria, and trained at a local Melbourne dancing school as a child until about 19 or 20. She then went to a professional dance school and trained under Betty Pounder, a choreographer for J. C. Williamson Theatre Ltd. She studied at Monash University from 1967 to 1970, where she obtained a Bachelor of Arts, majoring in English and history. While teaching at Williamstown High School, she successfully auditioned for Godspell, which continued its run for three years.

In 2001, Mann studied under Mark Rylance at Shakespeare’s Globe Theatre in London. In 2023, she studied American accent at Brave Studios under Tyler Coppin.

== Career ==
=== Film and television ===
In her first high-profile role, Mann appeared in the Network Ten soap opera Prisoner as original cast member Doreen Burns, during the first four seasons (1979–1982). Mann resigned from the role in March 1982 to pursue new challenges. She told Jill Fraser of TV Week that she had a university degree she had never used, and she also wanted to try something in current affairs. Her final episode (episode 304) was broadcast in August 1982. In November 1983, she agreed to reprise the role for six weeks, despite having a contract with the Nine Network to appear on The Don Lane Show. Mann admitted that the opportunity was too good to turn down, as she really liked Doreen's return storyline. Her main reason for leaving the show in 1982 was unhappiness with her character's storylines. She also said she would be happy to return the following year for further guest stints.

Mann has appeared in The Flying Doctors, MDA and Blue Heelers. In 1988, she portrayed the role of Edith Fraser in the American television movie Outback Bound, which also starred American actors Donna Mills and John Schneider. From late 1995, she briefly took over the role of Cheryl Stark in the soap opera Neighbours for eight weeks when Caroline Gillmer was taken ill. From February 2012, Mann joined the cast of Neighbours again, this time as regular character Sheila Canning. In February 2022 she permanently left the show.

Mann appears in the 1983 film Kitty and the Bagman with two of her former Prisoner castmates, Val Lehman and Gerard Maguire. She later appeared in 2000 feature film The Dish, alongside Sam Neill and Tom Long.

She has also appeared for numerous Screen Star Events in the UK. In 2023 she appeared at the Screen Star 15 year event alongside Tammy MacIntosh and Jacquie Brennan.

In 2022, Mann revealed that she filmed a cameo alongside Val Lehman and Fiona Spence for the final episode of season 7 of Wentworth. The series at the time had not been formally renewed for its final season, and ultimately the scene did not go to air.

Mann has also been a presenter on numerous TV shows including Hey Hey It's Saturday, What's Cooking, Good Morning Australia and The Circle. She has been a fill-in presenter for Glenn Ridge on talk back radio MTR 1377. In July 2019, she appeared on Jeremy Vine in the UK.

She has appeared in television commercials for Bare Funerals and National Lottery UK.

=== Stage ===
Mann was a member of the original Australian cast of Godspell in 1971. She performed the song "Turn Back, O'Man" in the production.

In the 1980s, Mann was part of a three-woman troupe called the Mini Busettes with fellow Prisoner actresses Jane Clifton and Betty Bobbitt. They performed for three seasons at Melbourne's Le Joke comedy venue and at many Sydney league clubs. After leaving Prisoner, Mann appeared in a production of On Our Selection with Garry McDonald.

Mann played the role of Buttercup in Opera Australia's production of HMS Pinafore by Gilbert and Sullivan in 2005. She then appeared on stage as Shirley, the battleaxe owner of Broken Hill pub, in Priscilla Queen of the Desert - the Musical in 2010.

In 2023, Mann joined the pantomime in the UK for Beauty and the Beast for its 2023 season.

=== Author ===
Mann has written two books, It's a Mann's World (1990) and Give Me a Break (2002). She also writes for New Idea magazine as a feature writer about her family and sons.

== Personal life ==
Mann has two sons, Sam and Charlie. As she began her tenure on Neighbours in 2012, Mann's marriage broke down.

In 1996, Mann walked the Kokoda Track for A Current Affair, alongside fellow celebrities Dermott Brereton, Grant Kenny, Daryl Braithwaite, Angry Anderson and Dr. Kerryn Phelps.

== Filmography ==
=== Film ===
Year	Title	Role	Type
1974	Between Wars	Student in Revue	Feature film
1982	Kitty and the Bagman	Doris de Salle	Feature film
2000	The Dish	Betty the Bush Poet	Feature film
2003	The House of Bulger		Video of short segments
2009	Just Desserts	Frances	Film short
2013	By a Loved One	Mother	Film short
2014	Grace Under Water	Toni	Film short

=== Television ===
Year	Title	Role	Notes
1974	The Champion		TV movie
1978	Cop Shop	Chris	1 episode
1979–1984	Prisoner	Doreen Anderson / Doreen Burns / Doreen	Regular (seasons 1 & 4), recurring (seasons 5–6)
1979	The Franky Doyle Story	Doreen Anderson	TV movie
1981	Prisoner in Concert	Doreen Burns	TV special
1988	Always Afternoon	Doreen	Miniseries, 1 episode
1988	Outback Bound	Edith Fraser	TV movie
1991	The Flying Doctors	Trisha / Grace	2 episodes
1993	Stark	Dixie	Miniseries, 3 episodes
1994	The Man from Snowy River: The McGregor Saga	Mrs. Carney	4 episodes
1995	The Client	Lorraine	Episode: "Child's Play"
1995–1996	Neighbours	Cheryl Stark	23 episodes
1997	JAG	E.R. Nurse	Episode: "Ghosts"
1999	Party of Five	Nurse	Episode: "Fate, Hope and Charity"
2002	History's Mysteries	Re-enactor	1 episode
2003	MDA	Daphne Lowe	Episode: "A Time and a Place"
2003	Blue Heelers	Denise Pertucci	Episode: "Motherhood"
2005	H.M.S. Pinafore	Little Buttercup	TV special
2010	Sleuth 101	Ann	Episode: "Late and Live"
2012–2022	Neighbours	Sheila Canning	Regular cast, 1101 episodes
2016	Neighbours: Summer Stories	Sheila Canning	Web series, 2 episodes
2017	Neighbours vs Time Travel	Sheila Canning	Web series, 3 episodes
2019	Wentworth	New Inmate (cameo)	Season 7, episode 10 (scene deleted)
2021; 2022	Fisk	Mrs Daphne Popovitch / Irma	2 episodes
2024	Lykkeland	Bee	8 episodes
2025	Full Story	Dr Sutton	

=== Other appearances ===
Year	Title	Role	Notes
1992	The Main Event	Contestant	1 episode
1993	What's Cooking	Co-host	
1995	Sale of the Century: Battle of the TV Classics	Contestant	4 episodes
1997	Frontline	Herself	1 episode
2006	Temptation	Contestant (with Val Lehman)	1 episode
2007–2011	20 to 1	Self	15 episodes
2016	All Star Family Feud	Contestant (with Val Lehman)	1 episode

== Theatre ==
=== As cast ===
Year	Title	Role	Notes
1971	Godspell	Peggy	Playbox Theatre, Melbourne
1974	Guys and Dolls	Ensemble	Total Theatre, Melbourne
1977	Hats		Playbox Theatre, Melbourne
1978	Gone with Hardy	Kate	MTC
1982	On Our Selection	Lily	MTC
1984	Catholic Schoolgirls		Bay Street Theatre, Sydney
1985	Stepping Out		Comedy Theatre, Melbourne
1993	The Dutch Courtesan	Madame Mary Faugh	Playhouse, Melbourne with MTC
1994	One Small Step	Regina	Australian tour with Theatre West, STC
1995–1996	Daze of Our Lives	She	Arts Centre Melbourne, Glen St Theatre, Sydney, Theatre 3, Canberra, Adelaide Festival Centre with Handspan Theatre
1997	Waking Eve	Evelyn	Merlyn Theatre, Melbourne with Playbox
2000	The Vagina Monologues	Solo/lead	Adrian Bohm Productions
2002	Savage Sensuality		Shakespeare’s Globe, London
2003	An Evening with Colette Mann: Her Big Chance	Lesley	VIC, ACT & NSW tour with HIT Productions
2005	HMS Pinafore	Buttercup	Opera Australia
2006	Urinetown	Ma Strong	STC with MTC
2008	Rabbit Hole		
2010	Priscilla Queen of the Desert - the Musical	Shirley / Broken Hill Bogan	Regent Theatre, Melbourne with Backrow Productions
2010	Dumped: The Musical	Harmony	Twelfth Night Theatre, Brisbane
2011	Strange Bedfellows	Faith	Albury Regent Theatre
2012	Head Full of Love	Nessa Tavistock	Queensland Theatre with QPAC / Darwin Festival
2017	Shear Madness	Sheila	
2023	Beauty and the Beast	Witch Mauvaise	Harlequin Theatre and Cinema, UK
2025	Follies	Emily Whitman	Palais Theatre, Melbourne with Victorian Opera

=== As crew ===
Year	Title	Role	Notes
1991	The Adman	Choreographer	Merlyn Theatre, Melbourne with Playbox
1998	I Do! I Do!	Producer	Capers Dinner Theatre, Melbourne
2015	Frankie and Johnny in the Clair de Lune	Director	Fortyfivedownstairs, Melbourne

== Awards ==
Year	Work	Award	Category	Result
2008	Priscilla Queen of the Desert - the Musical	Helpmann Awards	Best Female Actor in a Supporting Role	Won
2014	Neighbours	Equity Ensemble Awards	Best Performance by an Ensemble in a Drama Series	Nominated
