= Caroline Gillmer =

Australian actress (born 1955)

- Born: 1955 (age 70–71); Australia
- Occupation: Actress
- Known for: Prisoner, Neighbours, Underbelly

Caroline Gillmer (born 1955) is an Australian actress, best known for her roles in various television series, such as Prisoner as Helen Smart and Neighbours as Cheryl Stark.

Caroline appeared as Neighbours regular character and fan favourite Cheryl Stark from 1993 to 1996 before being killed off.

Cheryl has subsequently appeared in a flashback scene as part of Helen Daniels's death episodes in 1997 and last featured in a 2014 episode to celebrate the Kennedy family's 20th anniversary on Ramsay Street. A cast photo from the mid 1990s featuring Cheryl was shown on screen as part of the "final ever" episode end credits of the series in 2022.

Gillmer has had many guest roles in television series, including a recurring guest role on MDA and supporting roles in TV shows such as Bed of Roses. She portrayed Judy Moran in the hit TV series Underbelly.

In 2021, Gillmer appeared in the drama series Lie with Me.

== Personal life ==
Gillmer has been married to choreographer Tony Bartuccio since the 1980s.

== Filmography ==
=== Film ===
Year	Title	Role	Notes
1982	Fighting Back	Rosemary	Feature film
1985	An Indecent Obsession	Sally Dawkins	
1988	Evil Angels aka 'A Cry in the Dark'	Amy Whittaker	Feature film
1995	Hotel Sorrento	Hilary Moynihan	Feature film
1997	Paws	Susie	Feature film
2000	Muggers	Nurse Armstrong	Feature film
2000	The Monkey's Mask	Barbara Brach	Feature film AUS/Canada/France/Italy/Japan

=== Television ===
Year	Title	Role	Notes
1977	Bluey	Tracy Carter	TV series, Episode 33: "Witness"
1980–1984	Prisoner	Helen Smart	TV series, 78 episodes Recurring role
1981	Cop Shop	Margot Davis	TV series, 1 episode Guest role
1983	All the Rivers Run	Mabel Blakeney	TV miniseries, 4 episodes
1983	Carson's Law	Mrs. Doris Walsh	TV series, 1 episode
1983	Starting Out	Eleanor Harris	TV series, 3 episodes
1984	Matthew and Son	Gloria Doran	TV film / TV Pilot
1984	High Country	Marge	TV film
1986	Cyclone Tracy	Little Caroline	TV miniseries, 3 episodes
1987	A Country Practice	Sheila Simpson	TV series, 2 episodes: "Keep on Truckin': Parts 1 & 2"
1988	The Gerry Connolly Show	Robin	TV series, 1 episode: "1.6"
1989	The Magistrate	Sandy	ABC TV miniseries, 6 episodes
1991	G.P.	Maggie West	ABC TV series, 1 Episode: "The Right to Write"
1991	Brides of Christ	Sister Philomena	ABC TV miniseries, 3 episodes
1993	Seven Deadly Sins	Rachel	ABC Film TV series, 1 episode 4. "Greed'
1993	The Flood: Who Will Save Our Children?	Susan	TV film
1993–1996	Neighbours	Cheryl Stark	TV series, 380 episodes, Regular role
1996	In Cheryl's Arms	Cheryl Stark	TV pilot
1998	Good Guys, Bad Guys	Siobhan Starret	TV series, 1 episode: "Elvis Lives"
2001	Halifax f.p.	Roseanne	TV film series, Episode: "The Scorpion's Kiss"
2002–2003	MDA	Dr. Joan Barty	ABC TV series, 4 episodes Episodes: "Love You to Death", "Rites of Passage", "Eye of the Beholder", "Second Bite"
2008	Underbelly	Judy Moran	TV series, 6 episodes Recurring role (season 1)
2008–2011	Bed of Roses	Marg Braithwaite	ABC TV series, 26 episodes, Regular role
2017	Home and Away	Peggy King	TV series, 5 episodes, Guest role
2017	Offspring	Jill Crewe / Jill Crew	TV series, 4 episodes Episodes: "7.5", "7.7", "7.9", "7.10"
2021	Lie With Me	Cynthia Fallmont	TV miniseries, 3 episodes, Episodes: "1", "2", "4"
2022	Darby and Joan	Denise Redman	TV miniseries, 4 episodes

=== Other appearances ===
Year	Title	Role	Notes
1998	Denise	Herself - Guest	TV series, 1 episode
1997	Where Are They Now?	Guest - Herself	TV series, 1 episode
1995	Neighbours: A 10th Birthday Celebration	Herself / Cheryl Stark	TV special
1995	Inside 'Hotel Sorrento'	Herself	Video
1989	The Bert Newton Show	Guest Performer - sings "Smoke Gets In Your Eyes"	TV series, 1 episode
1978	The 20's And All That Jazz	Herself	ABC TV special

== Trivia ==
During her time off sick from Neighbours in 1995, Gillmer was temporarily replaced by fellow ex-Prisoner cast member Colette Mann who played Doreen Burns, and who later played Sheila Canning.
