= Tom Oliver =

British-born Australian television, film and theatre actor (born 1938)

- Born: 12 June 1938 (age 88); Fareham, Hampshire, England
- Occupation: Actor
- Years active: 1960–2016
- Known for: Neighbours as Lou Carpenter
- Spouse(s): Lynn Rainbow (1973–?); Jan Oliver (1985–present)

Tom Oliver (born 12 June 1938) is a British-born naturalised Australian retired actor, known internationally for his long-running role in TV soap opera Neighbours as Lou Carpenter, a role he played for some 25 years becoming one of the longest serving cast members. Lou was known for his constant sparring with Harold Bishop (played by Ian Smith) and romance with Madge (played by Anne Charleston), as well as his trademark dirty laugh, which Oliver noted was inspired by Sid James.

Oliver was a staple of the small screen from the early 1960s, until retiring in 2016. After appearing in numerous Crawford Productions police procedurals, he took the long term role in rural series Bellbird on the ABC, before starring in Number 96 as Jack Sellers.

== Biography ==
=== Early life and military ===
Oliver was born in Fareham, Hampshire, England and started appearing in amateur theatricals as an adolescent in Britain before pursuing a career as a jockey. However, he failed to gain an apprenticeship owing to his size.

Oliver joined the Merchant Navy at 16 and travelled the world, eventually settling in Sydney in 1956. Whilst in the British Forces, he worked on the Pacific Nuclear Testing Base, Christmas Island and so is a member of the British Nuclear Test Veterans Association.

While in Australia, Oliver found work as a stockman, spending three years in this job, working his way around the country. He subsequently beginning an overland trek across Asia to return to Australia. However, the journey was halted by illness and Oliver returned to Britain in 1960 and worked in reportory theatre and had brief roles in TV series.

== Career ==
Oliver contacted Albert Finney who was then planning to produce the film Ned Kelly in Australia in 1963. Finney gave him a letter of introduction to an agency in Sydney and Oliver emigrated in 1963, later becoming an Australian citizen. He frequently visits Fareham, Hampshire to see his old friends.

Oliver became a busy theatre and television actor in Australia. He had many guest starring roles on Australian drama series, appearing frequently in the top-rated Crawford Productions police dramas Homicide, Division 4, Matlock Police, and in Crawford's adventure series Hunter (1967). He played Clarry in The Shifting Heart.

HE appeared in the 1971 film Nickel Queen, directed by John McCallum. After this he returned to television guest roles for Crawfords, and other companies. He also appeared in several British TV series at the beginning of the 70's, such as Paul Temple, Thirty-Minute Theatre, and also played two roles in the Gerry Anderson series UFO – a doctor in the episode entitled "Confetti Check A-O.K." as well as a SHADO technician in the episode entitled "The Sound of Silence".

Oliver also worked for a time as a presenter on Play School in 1967.

Oliver has appeared in many local productions in guest roles, but became best down for his regular role in rural series 'Bellbird (TV series) in 1969 until 1971 as Tom Grey,

In 1972 he joined the cast of fledgling soap opera Number 96 playing the role of Janie Somers' new beau, Jack Sellars. Back-slapping rough diamond Jack, nicknamed 'Jolly Jack Sellars' was intended as a guest character to appear for a run of just three weeks, but the makers of the show were impressed with his performance and the character was made into an ongoing lead regular in the serial. Oliver became one of the Number 96's most popular cast members.

In late 1973, along with much of the show's regular cast, he reprised his television role in a feature film spinoff of the serial, also called Number 96. Oliver stayed in the role in the series for more than two years, finally electing to leave in mid-1974. He quickly returned to guest starring roles on television and film roles of varying sizes. He briefly returned to Number 96 in the same role in September 1975.

=== Further film, television and stage ===
Oliver's film roles included ABBA: The Movie (1977). His primary role in the film was as ABBA's gruff bodyguard; however, he additionally appeared in the film as a barman and as a chatty moustached taxi driver shown mainly from behind. Through the late 1970s and the 1980s, Oliver appeared in guest and regular roles in many Australian drama series and serials, including Prisoner, Holiday Island, Cop Shop, Sons and Daughters and A Country Practice. He also appeared in the acclaimed miniseries The Dismissal portraying Reg Withers.

Oliver also acted on the stage in numerous productions, appearing in such plays as The Knack, Cactus Flower, How the Other Half Loves and The Club.

=== Neighbours ===
Today Oliver is best known for his long-running role of Lou Carpenter in Neighbours. He first appeared for a handful of episodes as lovable rogue used-car salesman Lou, Madge Bishop's former flame, in 1988. In early 1992 the character was reintroduced to the series and was a key character until 2016. Oliver was written out of the show in 1996 but producers relented after numerous petitions from fans and he was quickly reintroduced. By 2009, he was the show's longest serving character, both in continuous and overall duration. From the 2009 season, Oliver reduced his role on Neighbours to a part-time regular member of the cast. Oliver appeared in a documentary special celebrating the show's 30th anniversary titled Neighbours 30th: The Stars Reunite, which aired in Australia and the UK in March 2015. In 2015, it was announced that Oliver had cut back further on his role as Lou and would only appear from time to time as a guest. In October 2016 it was announced that Oliver had left the role after 24 years and his last appearance aired in December 2016.

Lou did not feature in the series finale, but there was still a reference to his character in the form of a lawyers' office called "T Oliver". Executive producer Jason Herbison later revealed that he had personally called Oliver to inquire about returning for the final episode, but Oliver turned it down as he was "at a different point in his life now".

== Awards ==
Oliver has been nominated for the AACTA Award for Best Actor in a Supporting Role three times.

== Personal life ==
During his run in Number 96, Oliver married fellow castmate Lynn Rainbow, who played Sonia Vansard, and opened a wine bar in Kensington, Sydney, named "Jack's Cellar".

Oliver has been married to his American wife Jan since 1985. They lived together in the Dandenong Ranges. Oliver once owned a Maltese Shih Tzu called Louey, named after his Neighbours character. Oliver is a keen gardener.

Oliver has one daughter.

== Filmography ==
=== Film ===
| Year | Title | Role | Notes |
|---|---|---|---|
| 1963 | Summer Holiday | | Feature film |
| 1966 | They're a Weird Mob | Barbecue chef's friend | Feature film |
| 1966 | Point of Danger | | TV film |
| 1969 | Color Me Dead | Dr. McDonald | Feature film |
| 1970 | Adam's Woman | Stacey | Film |
| 1970 | Paul Temple | Eddy Bates | TV film |
| 1971 | Nickel Queen | Roy Olding | Feature film |
| 1974 | Number 96 | Jack Sellars | Film |
| 1975 | That Coffee Lady From Peking | Coffee Shop Man | |
| 1977 | Going Home | | TV film |
| 1977 | ABBA: The Movie | Bodyguard, Bartender, Taxi driver | Feature film |
| 1977 | Say You Want Me | Photographer | TV film |
| 1978 | Because He's My Friend | Ian | TV film |
| 1983 | High Country | Frank Stacey | TV film |

=== Television ===
| Year | Title | Role | Notes |
|---|---|---|---|
| 1964 | Consider Your Verdict | | TV series, season 1, episode 145: "Queen Versus Langdon" |
| 1965 | Adventure Unlimited | Bill Malone | TV series, 2 episodes |
| 1966 | Australian Playhouse | Mr Carruthers | TV series, season 1, episode 16: "Done Away With It" |
| 1967 | Love and War | | TV miniseries, episode 2: "Sergeant Musgrave's Dance" |
| 1967 | You Can't See 'Round Corners | | TV series, 3 episodes |
| 1967 | Contrabandits | Nicholls | TV series, 3 episodes |
| 1968 | Hunter | Hans Felburg | TV series, season 1, episode 26: "The Hans Felburg File" |
| 1969 | Riptide | Dave Todd / Bruno / Mike Hallett | TV series, 3 episodes |
| 1969 | Good Morning Mr Doubleday | | TV series, season 1, episode 9: "A Friend in Need" |
| 1969–71 | Bellbird | Tom Grey | TV series, 83 episodes |
| 1969; 1970 | Skippy the Bush Kangaroo | Craig / Tex n Ranger | TV series, 2 episodes |
| 1970 | Thirty-Minute Theatre | David | TV series, season 5, episode 23 |
| 1970 | Paul Temple | Eddy Bates | season 2, 1 episode: "Right Villain" |
| 1970; 1972 | Homicide | Jason Williams / Jack Smith / Jeff Roberts | TV series, 3 episodes |
| 1970–75 | Division 4 | Arnie Cooper / Jimmy Harrison / George Morris / Robert Hill / Porter | TV series, 5 episodes |
| 1971 | UFO | Doctor / 1st technician | TV series, season 1, 2 episodes |
| 1971 | The Group | | TV series, season 1, episode 4: "This Week She's Romantic" |
| 1971 | Dynasty | Tom Fenwick | TV series, 3 episodes |
| 1971; 1975 | Matlock Police | Charlie / Alexis Katsavakis / Neil O'Brian / Roy Martin | TV series, 4 episodes |
| 1972–75 | Number 96 | Jack Sellars | TV series, 105 episodes |
| 1973 | Spyforce | Brian Dorsey | TV series, season 1, episode 36: "The Misfits" |
| 1975 | Ben Hall | Long Tom Coffin | TV miniseries, 5 episodes |
| 1976 | Silent Number | Stanton | TV series, season 1, episode 39: "Paula" |
| 1976–80 | King's Men | Detective Sgt. Peter Weston | TV series, 13 episodes |
| 1977 | The Outsiders | Artie Fraser | TV series, season 1, episode 12: "Ambush" |
| 1977 | Glenview High | Mick | TV series, season 1, episode 12: "Plumber's Boy" |
| 1977 | The Dick Emery Show in Australia | Various characters | TV series |
| 1978 | The Truckies | | TV series, season 1, episode 1: "Running In" |
| 1978–83 | Cop Shop | Brian Matthews / George Burton / Albert Cobb / Vinny Pratt / Peter Mitchell | TV series, season 1, 10 episodes |
| 1979 | Skyways | Scott Honeyman | TV series, season 1, episode 180: "Tippett the Pilot" |
| 1980–81 | Prisoner (aka Prisoner: Cell Block H) | Ken Pearce | TV series, 14 episodes |
| 1980; 1984 | Kingswood Country | Gerald Holmes / Clive Lomas | TV series, 2 episodes |
| 1981–82 | Holiday Island | Wally Simmons | TV series, 64 episodes |
| 1982 | Sons and Daughters | Andrew Brooks | TV series, season 1, episode 279 |
| 1983 | The Dismissal | Liberal Senator Reg Withers | TV miniseries, 3 episodes |
| 1983 | Patrol Boat | Inspector Forest | TV series, season 2, episode 9: "Operation Christmas" |
| 1983–87 | A Country Practice | Ross Irving / Ray Gardner / Stuart Moore / Henry Gill | TV series, 10 episodes |
| 1984 | The Explorers | Sir Thomas Mitchell | TV documentary series, season 1, episode 5: "Australia Felix" |
| 1984 | Special Squad | Tobin | TV series, season 1, episode 3: "Code of Silence" |
| 1986 | Call Me Mister | Bruce | TV series, season 1, episode 1: "Longshot" |
| 1988 | The Beachcombers | Reporter | TV series, season 16, episode 14: "Local Heroes" |
| 1988 | The Dirtwater Dynasty | Our Dad | TV miniseries, 1 episode |
| 1988; 1992–2016 | Neighbours | Lou Carpenter | TV series, 2,821 episodes |
| 1989 | Hey Dad..! | Waiter | TV series, season 3, episode 37: "The Cluck of the Draw" |
| 1992 | Mother and Son | Sergeant | TV series, season 5, episode 6: "The Baby" |

=== Appearances (as self) ===
| Year | Title | Role | Type |
|---|---|---|---|
| | Play School | Host | TV series |
| 1967 | Is Anybody Doing Anything About It? | Himself | |
| 1971 | Tempo: In the Seventies | Commentator | |
| 1976 | The Celebrity Game | Contestant | TV series |
| 1979 | The Great Train Robbery | Performer | |
| 1995 | Neighbours: A 10th Anniversary | Himself / Lou Carpenter | TV documentary special |
| 1996 | Burke's Backyard | Celebrity Gardener | TV series |
| 1996 | National Television Awards | Himself | Awards show |
| 2000 | Neighbours Revealed | Himself | TV documentary special |
| 2008 | Neighbours on Five | | |
| 2012 | This Morning | Himself | |
| 2012 | The Wright Stuff | Guest Panelist | TV series |
| 2013 | Celebrity Juice | Himself | TV series |
| 2015 | Neighbours 30th: The Stars Reunite | Himself / Lou Carpenter | TV documentary special |

=== As producer ===
| Year | Title | Role | Type |
|---|---|---|---|
| 1987 | The Right Hand Man | Producer | |

== Theatre ==
| Year | Title | Role | Venue / Co. |
|---|---|---|---|
| 1965 | The Knack | Tolen | Phillip Street Theatre |
| 1965 | The Birthday Party | | Independent Theatre, Sydney |
| 1965 | The Business of Good Governance | | Assembly Hall, Sydney with Q Theatre Company |
| 1965 | Where Did Vortex Go? | | St Alban's War Memorial Hall, Sydney, Killara Soldiers Memorial Hall, Sydney with Community Theatre Company Limited |
| 1966 | Cactus Flower | Harvey | Theatre Royal, Sydney, Comedy Theatre, Melbourne |
| 1967 | The Homecoming | | UNSW, Old Tote Theatre, Canberra Theatre |
| 1968 | The Shifting Heart | Clarrie | ABC TV Studios, Melbourne (live broadcast as part of Wednesday Theatre) |
| 1971 | Three Months Gone | | Russell Street Theatre, Melbourne with MTC |
| 1976 | A Handful of Friends | | Russell Street Theatre, Melbourne with MTC |
| 1977 | Away Match | Tony Piper | Marian Street Theatre, Sydney |
| 1978 | The Club | | Playhouse Theatre, Perth with MTC |
| 1978 | Fathers Day | Tom | Mayfair Theatre, Sydney, Total Theatre, Melbourne |
| 1980 | Family Circles | Ted | Marian Street Theatre, Sydney |
| 1982 | Night and Day | George Guthrie | Marian Street Theatre, Sydney, Canberra Theatre |
| 1982 | The Price | | Ensemble Theatre, Sydney |
| 1984 | Season's Greeting's | Neville | Marian Street Theatre, Sydney with Northside Theatre Company |
| 1986 | Otherwise Engaged | | Marian Street Theatre, Sydney |
| 1988 | Breaking the Code | | Northside Theatre, Sydney |
| 1988; 1989 | Time and Time Again | | Ensemble Theatre, Sydney for Sydney Festival |
| 1989 | Curtains | | Northside Theatre, Sydney |
| 1989 | How the Other Half Loves | | Glen Street Theatre, Sydney, Laycock Street Theatre, Gosford, University of Sydney, Twelfth Night Theatre, Brisbane, Gold Coast Arts Centre, New Independent Theatre, Auckland |
| 1990 | A Night with Robinson Crusoe | | Ensemble Theatre, Sydney for Sydney Festival |
| 1990–1991 | Noises Off | Lloyd Dallas | Glen Street Theatre, Sydney, Twelfth Night Theatre, Brisbane, Newcastle Civic Theatre, Illawarra Performing Arts Centre, Gold Coast Arts Centre, Nambour, Bundaberg, Ayr, Cairns, Mackay, Townsville, Comedy Theatre, Her Majesty's Theatre, Adelaide, Regal Theatre, Perth with Theatre of Comedy |
