= Neighbours =

Australian television soap opera (1985–2025)

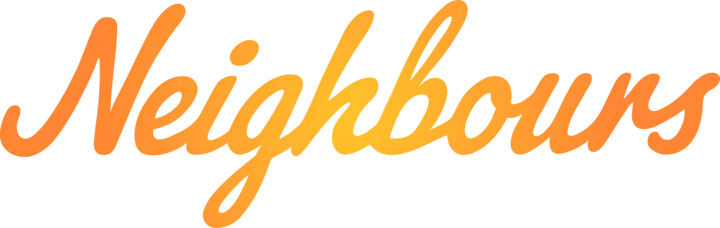
- Genre: Soap opera
- Created by: Reg Watson
- Starring: Cast
- Theme music composer: Tony Hatch (theme music); Jackie Trent (lyrics)
- Opening theme: Neighbours theme
- Country of origin: Australia
- Original language: English
- No. of seasons: 41
- No. of episodes: 9,363

Production
- Executive producer: Jason Herbison
- Producer: Andrew Thompson
- Production locations: Melbourne, Australia
- Running time: 22–24 minutes
- Production companies: Grundy Television (1985–2006); Fremantle Australia (2006–2025); Amazon MGM Studios (2023–2025)

Original release
- Network: Seven Network
- Release: 18 March – 8 November 1985
- Network: Network 10
- Release: 20 January 1986 – 17 December 2010
- Network: Eleven / 10 Peach
- Release: 11 January 2011 – 28 July 2022
- Network: Network 10 / Amazon Prime Video
- Release: 18 September 2023 – 11 December 2025

Related
- Neighbours: Erinsborough High

Neighbours (Note: From 2023 to 2025, the show was also branded as Neighbours: A New Chapter by Amazon Freevee.) is an Australian television soap opera that aired from 1985 to 2025. It was created by television executive Reg Watson. The Seven Network commissioned the show following the success of Watson's earlier soap Sons and Daughters. Although successful in Melbourne, Neighbours underperformed in the Sydney market and was cancelled by Seven Network four months after it began airing. It was immediately commissioned by rival Network Ten for a second production season, which began screening in January 1986. Neighbours became the longest-running drama series in Australian television history in 1997, and was inducted into the Logie Hall of Fame in 2005.

The storylines concern the lives of the people who live and work in Erinsborough, a fictional suburb of Melbourne, Victoria. The series centres on the residents of Ramsay Street, a dead end street, and its neighbouring area, the Lassiters complex, which includes a bar, hotel, café, police station, lawyers' office and park. Neighbours began with a focus on three households created by Watson – including the Ramsay and Robinson families, who have a long history and an ongoing rivalry. Over the serial's early years, three additional houses on the street were introduced as regular settings. Pin Oak Court, in Vermont South, is the real cul-de-sac that doubled for Ramsay Street. The houses featured are real and the residents allowed the production to shoot external scenes in their yards. The interior scenes were filmed at the FremantleMedia studios in Forest Hill.

Until 2022, Neighbours was screened in Australia as a 22-minute episode on weeknights. It moved to Ten's digital channel, Eleven (later rebranded 10 Peach) in January 2011, and was broadcast each weeknight. The show was produced by Fremantle Australia and has been sold to more than 60 countries around the world, making it one of Australia's most successful media exports. Neighbours had been especially successful in the United Kingdom, where it was first screened in October 1986 on BBC One, and achieved huge popularity among British audiences in the late 1980s and 1990s. In 2008, it moved in the UK to Channel 5, which largely funded the series as it was no longer commercially viable for Ten to fund it alone; the show became the first Australian drama to air all year round.

The show was cancelled in early 2022, and the finale was broadcast in July. In November 2022, Amazon Freevee and Fremantle agreed to restart the series, which returned to Network 10 on a permanent basis. Regular production resumed in April 2023 and the show returned in September. The series was cancelled again in February 2025, with production concluding in July and the final episode airing in December.

== History ==
Neighbours was created by Australian TV executive Reg Watson. Watson got the idea for Neighbours during his time working on Crossroads and watching fellow soap Coronation Street in Britain. He had already created successful Australian made soap operas The Young Doctors, Prisoner and Sons and Daughters. Watson proposed the idea of making a show that would focus on more realistic stories and portray teens and adults who talk openly to each other and solve their problems together. He also wanted the show to appeal to both Australian and British audiences. Several titles were discussed, including People Like Us, One Way Street, No Through Road and Living Together, before Neighbours was chosen. Watson said "In the end it came down to being what it is, a story around neighbours." Reporters from the Herald Sun said that Watson took his idea to the Nine Network in 1982, but it was rejected. Former Nine executive Ian Johnson described the rejection as "one of the biggest 'missed opportunities'" during his time at the network. The show was then offered to the Seven Network, who commissioned the show in September 1984. The serial went into production that November with an $8 million budget. The show's initial premise focused on three households, made up of 12 core characters, living in Ramsay Street, dealing with everyday life with humour and drama. The first episode was broadcast on 18 March 1985 and reviews for the show were favourable. However, the Melbourne-produced program underperformed in the Sydney market and Seven announced on 12 July 1985 that it was cancelling the show. Neighbours continued to air on Seven until 8 November 1985.

Neighbours was immediately bought by Seven's rival Network Ten. The new network had to build replica sets when it took over production after Seven destroyed the original sets to prevent the rival network obtaining them. Ten began screening the series with episode 171 on 20 January 1986. In 1986, the series was bought by the BBC as part of their new daytime schedule in the United Kingdom. Neighbours made its debut on BBC1 on 27 October 1986 starting with the pilot episode. It soon gained a loyal audience and the show became particularly popular with younger viewers; before long, it was watched by up to 16 million viewers, which was more than the entire population of Australia at the time. In 1988, Neighbours became the only television show to have its entire cast flown over to the UK to make an appearance at the Royal Variety Performance in front of the Queen. Neighbours became the longest-running drama series in Australian television and the seventh longest-running serial drama that was still on the air in the world. In 2005, Neighbours celebrated its 20th anniversary and more than 20 former cast members returned for a special episode, which saw the characters sitting down to watch a documentary about Ramsay Street and its residents. At the Logie Award ceremony that year, the show was inducted into the Logie Hall of Fame.

In 2007, the show underwent a revamp, which included a switch to recording in HDTV, the introduction of a new family, the departure of several existing characters and a new version of the show's theme song and opening titles. In addition, episode titles were abandoned, having been in use for the previous three years. Daniel Bennett, the new head of drama at Network Ten, announced that the crux of the Ramsay Street story would go "back to basics" and follow a less sensational path than of late with the emphasis on family relations and suburban reality. Executive producer Ric Pellizzeri said new writers, actors and sets would bring the soap back to its glory days. He added "We moved too far into event-driven stories rather than the character-driven stories that made Neighbours what it is". The relaunch failed to attract more viewers in Australia. Pellizzeri left the series at the end of 2007 and former Neighbours scriptwriter Susan Bower became the new executive producer. In 2008, Neighbours was branded "too white" by black and Asian viewers in Britain and in Australia there was talk of a "White Australia policy" when it came to casting actors for soaps. In response to the criticism, Bower made a decision to add more ethnically diverse extras, small walk-on roles and speaking parts, as well as introducing the character of Sunny Lee (played by Hany Lee), an exchange student from South Korea.

On 18 March 2010, Neighbours celebrated its 25th anniversary. In April, Channel 5 in the UK launched a search to find a female actress to play the part of Poppy Rogers. The search was similar to the Dolly magazine competition in Australia. August saw Neighbours air its 6,000th episode. Digital Spy revealed that the week-long 6,000th episode celebrations would see the wedding of regular characters, Donna Freedman (Margot Robbie) and Ringo Brown (Sam Clark). It was later announced that an attempt on the life of long term regular, Paul Robinson (Stefan Dennis) would be the focus of the actual 6,000th episode. Bower said "Last week I saw episode 6,000. This marks Australian television history. The 6,000th episode falls on a Friday so the whole week is a special one. As Stefan Dennis – Paul Robinson – was in the first episode 25 years ago, it was decided that his character play a most important role in this very special event".

In late 2010, the TV Tonight website reported Neighbours was to reduce crew operations in 2011 so production could be upgraded. The changes meant that the location manager and catering team were no longer required, studio shoots would be reduced from three cameras to two, and location shooting would be restricted. Of the changes, FremantleMedia said "Neighbours is undergoing a work flow upgrade to accommodate advances in technology and production techniques to ensure we are at the forefront of professionalism and efficiency." They added that the show's production model had been in place since 1985 and that it was time to evolve it. On 14 March 2011, The Australian reported that Neighbours has become the first television show available to watch on a free iPhone application. Viewers are able to watch whole episodes within three hours of them airing on Eleven. Nick Spooner, the head of Ten digital media said "This is part of what we call our 'three-screen approach' – broadcast, online and mobile – and it is intended to build viewer engagement with a show and our brand. This is a way for us to stay in touch with our audience and to keep them coming back." To celebrate the wedding of Prince William of Wales and Kate Middleton, Neighbours filmed a specially commissioned scene for the UK episode airing on the same day as the wedding. The episode, which had already aired in Australia, marked the first time an Australian show recorded extra scenes for a UK broadcaster.

On 25 October 2011, it was announced Bower would leave Neighbours in December 2011 to move into a new international role with FremantleMedia. Of her departure, Bower told Colin Vickery of the Herald Sun, "I love Neighbours, it is a wonderful show and because of this I felt it was important that fresh eyes and brains take over to keep this Australian icon contemporary. Having said that, I'm really excited about the new role and thank FremantleMedia for this wonderful opportunity." Former City Homicide producer, Richard Jasek, took over Bower's role, while Alan Hardy took over the role of producer. On 4 December 2013, it was announced that Jasek would be leaving Neighbours and Jason Herbison would replace him, initially with the title of series producer. FremantleMedia's head of drama Jo Porter became executive producer, while Laurence Wilson became the associate producer. The show celebrated its 7,000th episode on 24 October 2014. In March 2015, Neighbours celebrated its 30th anniversary and twelve former cast members returned for the anniversary episodes that revolved around an Erinsborough Festival. Network Ten and Channel 5 aired a documentary special titled Neighbours 30th: The Stars Reunite, which featured interviews with current and former cast members, including Kylie Minogue, Jason Donovan and Guy Pearce, reflecting on their time on the show. Natalie Lynch succeeded Wilson as producer in early 2016.

In 2017, there was speculation that Neighbours would cease production following the breakdown of its deals in the United Kingdom, and Network Ten entering voluntary administration. On 9 October 2017, Stewart Clarke of Variety reported that Channel 5 and FremantleMedia had agreed a new deal that would see the yearly episode count increased from 240 to 258, as well as plans for new primetime specials. The deal meant that from 2018, Neighbours would run across the full year for the first time in its history, including over December and January. Herbison stated, "We value our global audiences and are delighted to stay on this journey together. Come the end of 2018 we will also make history by becoming the first Australian drama series to screen all year round." Following the departure of Sonya Rebecchi in 2019, actor Eve Morey stated that the killing off of her character was a measure to reduce production costs for the program as part of its new negotiations. When the cast and crew returned from their annual production break on 13 January 2020, they filmed a scene addressing the Australian bushfires for the episode airing on 15 January. The scene features the characters Sheila Canning (Colette Mann), David Tanaka (Takaya Honda) and Aaron Brennan (Matt Wilson) discussing the fires and a charity event Sheila is organising. Channel 5 directed its viewers to a dedicated information page on their website at the end of the episode. Neighbours suspended production for two days amid the COVID-19 pandemic in March 2020, after a crew member came into contact with someone who had the virus. Production shut down early for the scheduled Easter break before resuming after four weeks on 27 April 2020, making Neighbours the first mainstream scripted show to resume production during the pandemic. In order to adhere to government guidelines and social-distancing, Neighbours created separate areas to spread out the cast and crew. They removed intimate scenes between characters and editing allows producers to give the illusion of large crowds and groups. Daily temperature checks for cast and crew will also be carried out. Herbison said that the pandemic would not be included in storylines. He stated, "We are currently plotting episodes that won't air until much later in the year, so anything we write now might feel very outdated. Further to this, there's a creative question: will our viewers want to switch on Neighbours and relive it again, or is our job to provide escapism? I tend to feel it's the latter."

=== Cancellation and revival ===
In February 2022, it was announced that Channel 5 would be dropping the serial from its schedule later that year, and that production would cease if an alternative British broadcaster was not secured. In response to the threat to the series' future, a fan-run petition on Change.org asking Channel 5 to reconsider its decision was launched, which was signed by more than 50,000 people, including cast member Lucinda Cowden. This also sparked "#saveneighbours" to trend on social media. Numerous current and former cast members, such as Annie Jones, Natalie Bassingthwaighte and Geoff Paine expressed their sadness online, while Rob Mills called on the Morrison government to step in and help. An online campaign was launched to get Barry Crocker's version of the Neighbours theme song to number one in the UK charts. The song reached number one on the iTunes chart for almost 24 hours. An article in The Sydney Morning Herald noted that following the merger of Viacom and CBS, Channel 5 in the UK and Channel 10 in Australia were owned by the same corporate umbrella. However, the funding arrangements meant that one part of ViacomCBS was cross-subsidising another.

On 3 March 2022, it was confirmed that the show would end after 37 years on air, after production company Fremantle could not obtain a new UK broadcaster. Stefan Dennis said of the cancellation, "Simply put, it is all about the quickly changing landscape in the way we view our favourite TV shows. Drama on free-to-air television is dying a rapid death because nowadays viewers are used to being able to watch what they want when they want. Ultimately, Neighbours is a product in the big business of film and television and like any other business, if a product isn't making money, it will make way for one that will. All TV shows come to an end – even the likes of long-time legends such as Coronation Street and Days of Our Lives will eventually cease. Survival of these shows is in the viewers' hands." Cast member Georgie Stone revealed that she discovered the cancellation on Twitter and was initially unsure whether to believe it, until she was contacted by a producer who told her it was true. Fans reported significant upset at the announcement of the end of the series.

The final episode was initially intended to air on 1 August 2022 in both the UK and Australia, after 10 Peach decided to close the broadcasting gap between the two countries by airing double episodes from 13 June. It was later announced that the finale would air on 28 July at 7:30 pm on Network 10 and 10 Peach simultaneously in Australia as a one-and-half-hour-long episode. It was broadcast on 29 July 2022 in the UK as a one-hour-long episode. A study conducted shortly after the final episode aired in Australia and the UK found that fans experienced considerable feelings of grief and loss at the conclusion of the series, with viewers having formed strong connections and bonds with their favorite characters.

On 17 November 2022, it was announced Fremantle and Amazon Freevee had reached a deal that would allow Neighbours production to restart in 2023. New episodes would be free to stream from the UK and US from the second half of 2023, and Network 10 would retain the rights to broadcast the serial first in Australia. Archive episodes would also be released prior to the relaunch. Lauren Anderson of Amazon Studios said, "With the power of streaming, we're able to offer a catalogue of thousands of Neighbours episodes for new audiences to discover this legendary series and current fans to relive their favourite moments. We look forward to immersing the audience in new Ramsay Street experiences when we relaunch the show next year for Amazon Freevee and Prime Video customers." Jason Herbison continued as executive producer, with Dennis, Fletcher, Woodburne and Moloney returning to the cast, all of whom were informed of the revival by Herbison, who told them in-person. Other cast members were not informed prior to the announcement of the show's return. It was confirmed that Neighbours would be produced for at least two years, with 200 new episodes being released per year.

In February 2023, the returns of Rebekah Elmaloglou, Jones, Tim Kano and Stone as series regulars were announced; Melissa Bell, April Rose Pengilly and Ian Smith were also announced to returning in guest capacities. Regular production recommenced on 17 April, though scenes featuring Jones and Guy Pearce were filmed in the UK earlier in the year. American actress Mischa Barton was brought in for an extended guest role for the revival.

In February 2025, it was announced Neighbours had been cancelled again. In a statement, the series announced: "We are sad to announce that Neighbours will be resting from December 2025. New episodes from the 40th anniversary season will continue to air on Prime Video and Ten four times a week until the end of the year, with all the big soapie twists and turns that our viewers love." The show's cancellation was originally reported via The Sun, who published the story before the show's cast and crew were informed by the production company. In his report, David Knox of TV Tonight noted the closure of Amazon Freevee and the exit of producers who commissioned the series as reasons for the cancellation. Production continued until 11 July 2025.

In November 2025, Digital Spy revealed that Matt Wilson, Darcy Tadich, Shiv Palekar, Georgie Stone, Richie Morris, Scott Major, Ben Hall, Gemma Bird Matheson, Xavier Molyneux, Zima Anderson, Lucinda Cowden and Peter O'Brien had all reprised their roles for the final episodes. It was also announced that the finale would air as a one hour episode at 8:40 pm on 11 December on Network 10 in Australia, with Amazon releasing the finale 2 hours prior.

Herbison designed the 2025 finale to reflect the real-world situation, particularly in light of the immediate loss of the series' studio in Nunawading, Victoria, and to offer the possibility of future Neighbours revivals. On-screen, a freeway development threatened the future of Ramsay Street and the Lassiters complex. The series ended ambiguously, with characters presented with the option of investing in one of two new developments, led by Paul Robinson and Shane Ramsay, or to fight to save Ramsay Street.

== Setting ==
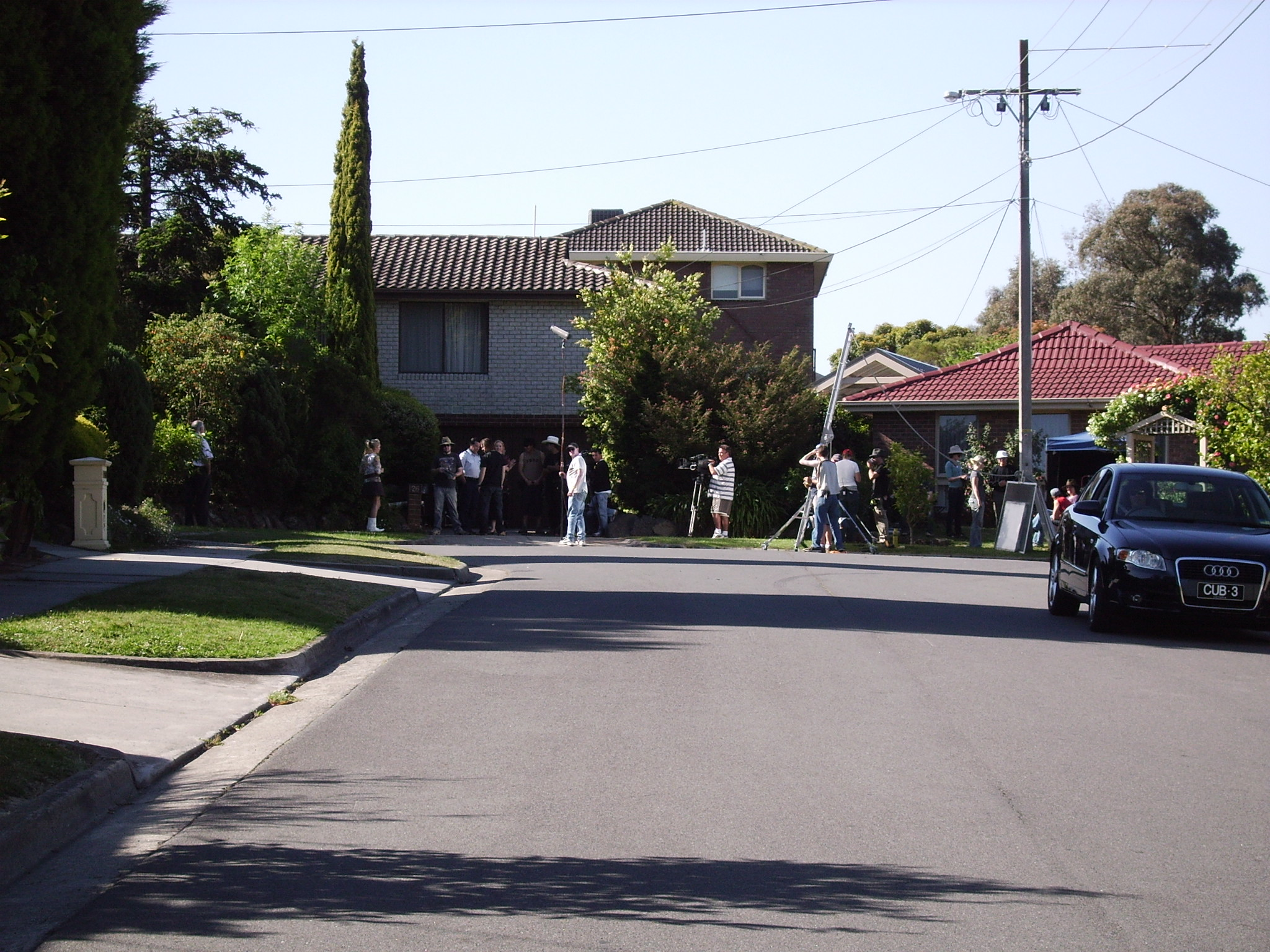
Pin Oak Court, Vermont South, the filming location used to represent the fictional Ramsay Street in Neighbours

Neighbours' focus is the fictional Ramsay Street, a residential cul-de-sac in the fictional Melbourne suburb of Erinsborough. The street was named after the grandfather of original character Max Ramsay (Francis Bell). Other locations include Erinsborough High School, the garage (local mechanic), hospital, and the Lassiters complex, which contains Lassiters Hotel, The Waterhole bar, Harold's Café, the lawyers office Rebecchi Law, and the police station. Ahead of the 25th anniversary, the Erinsborough village set underwent a makeover. The café and bar remained the same, but the centre of the complex was upgraded. Lassiters Hotel was given a new logo and gained a second floor with outdoor seating area. The hospital and police station received new facades, a used car lot was created near the garage and a new university set was created.

Pin Oak Court, in Vermont South, is the real cul-de-sac that doubles for Ramsay Street. All of the houses featured in the show are real and the residents allow Neighbours to shoot external scenes in their front and back yards and on occasions, in their garages. Neighbours has been filmed in Pin Oak Court since the series began in 1985 and it has since become popular with tourists. Tours to the cul-de-sac run throughout the year. The interior scenes are filmed at the Global Television studios in Forest Hill, the adjoining suburb in which Pin Oak Court is located. Under the contract for filming to take place on the street, the residents of Pin Oak Court require permission to alter the exterior of their properties; between the series' cancellation and revival in 2022 and 2023, some residents took the opportunity to make renovations without hindrance.

Through much of the show's run, it was not stated in which Australian city Erinsborough was located. The rivalry between Sydney and Melbourne meant that scripts did not mention that Erinsborough was a suburb of the latter city until 1994. Since 2016, the show has begun filming more scenes in and around Melbourne. Other Australian locations mentioned and sometimes seen in the series include the fictitious suburbs of West Waratah, Eden Hills, Ansons Corner, and the real-life town of Oakey in Queensland. Neighbours filmed scenes in Sydney's Darling Harbour and on board a cruise ship in August 2010, marking the third time that the show had filmed scenes outside of Victoria. Further Australian filming locations have included Port Douglas and the Great Barrier Reef region, Geelong, the Gold Coast, and the Sydney Gay and Lesbian Mardi Gras, where the serial also had its own float during the parade. Scenes for Paul Robinson (Stefan Dennis) and Terese Willis' (Rebekah Elmaloglou) 2019 wedding were filmed at a resort in Queensland.

Filming locations outside of Australia have included Kenya, the United States, and the United Kingdom, which has seen Neighbours episodes filmed there on a number of occasions. The first storyline aired in February 1990 and was filmed at Lyme Park in Cheshire. In November 1992, the characters Rick Alessi (Dan Falzon) and Debbie Martin (Marnie Reece-Wilmore) visit London to attend a Michael Jackson concert. However, producers could not film at the concert after negotiations with Jackson's tour management failed. The second London-based storyline was broadcast in late March 2007 and featured scenes shot on the London Eye and a boat on the River Thames. Four further storylines shot on location in London aired in March 2017, March 2018, September 2019, October 2021. The show was due to film in Ireland for the first time in March 2020, before the shoot was cancelled owing to the COVID-19 pandemic. In February 2023, Annie Jones (Jane Harris) and Guy Pearce (Mike Young) filmed scenes in Surrey, which were the first to be shot for the revival.

== Broadcast ==
Neighbours aired from Monday to Thursday weekly at 4:00 pm on Network 10 and is replayed at 6:30 pm on 10 Peach Comedy in Australia. Until 2018, Neighbours was broadcast from early January to early December for approximately 48–49 weeks each year, going off-air for four to five weeks during the Christmas and New Year period. From 2018 until 2020 the show aired all year round, although a three-week Christmas break occurred in 2021–2022. This was not repeated in 2023; however, in late 2024 it took a two-week break. All aired episodes shown during the week are available to watch on Network 10's 10Play app, as part of their catch up TV service. 10 Peach also broadcast the last four aired episodes shown in an omnibus edition each Sunday.

When the show began in 1985, the first season was broadcast on the Seven Network, at 5:30 pm in Sydney, at 6:00 pm in Melbourne and Adelaide and at 7:00 pm in Brisbane. The show's transmission in other areas was varied and many regional channels declined to purchase the series. When the show debuted on Network Ten in 1986 it screened at 7:00 pm. On 9 March 1992 the show moved to 6:30 pm to avoid direct competition from rival soap opera Home and Away on the Seven Network. Repeat episodes of Neighbours episodes from the 1988–1991 period were broadcast between 2000 and 30 June 2003 on Network Ten. These episodes were seen at 3:30 pm, before moving to 11:30 am. During 2008, Ten HD broadcast the previous week's episodes in an omnibus edition each Sunday. These omnibus editions did not return in 2009, as Ten HD was replaced by One HD from March 2009.

In August 2010, Sydney's Daily Telegraph reported that Neighbours would be moving to Ten's new digital channel, to make way for a new current affairs show. They said "It's part of a re-branding of Ten's free-to-air channel, targeting the older demographic. The 'younger' shows, like Neighbours, will go on to one of Ten's digital channels". It was later confirmed that the show would be moving to digital channel, Eleven. Network Ten's programmer, David Mott said "We believe Neighbours is perfectly suited to Eleven's audience strategy and will find a successful and enduring home on Eleven". Neighbours moved to Eleven on 11 January 2011, the channel's launch day. The decision to move Neighbours to a digital channel, and the consequent drop in Australian viewership, has been described as the cause of the series' eventual cancellation in 2022. Throughout 2013, Eleven had broadcast repeat episodes of Neighbours from the 2007 period, titled Old School Neighbours, during weekday mornings. In 2015, Network Ten had broadcast an encore of the previous day's episode at 7:00 am weekdays. In 2018, for the first time in the series' history, the show's classification became PG, owing to the series' increasingly adult subject matter.

On 15 July 2021, David Knox of TV Tonight confirmed that from 26 July Neighbours would begin airing four times a week. This marked the first time in the show's history that it had not aired five episodes per week. Knox said the new schedule was likely an attempt at getting the Australian episodes to synchronise with the UK broadcast, which had fallen behind owing to the COVID-19 pandemic. The move caused some viewers to speculate that the soap was on the verge of being cancelled, but April Rose Pengilly (who plays Chloe Brennan) confirmed that the rumours were not true. On 23 November 2021, a spokesperson from Channel 5 confirmed that Neighbours episodes would continue airing five times a week in 2022, while 10 Peach would be keeping the episodes at four, putting the UK ahead of Australia.

On 28 July 2022, Neighbours aired the 90-minute Series Finale on Thursday at 7:30 pm on Network 10 and simulcast on 10 Peach.

When Neighbours returned on 18 September 2023, episodes air on Network 10 every Monday to Thursday at 4:00 pm with a second airing on the same day in the former 6:30 pm timeslot on 10 Peach. and repeated the next day at 9:30 am on 10 and catch up on the weekly episodes on 10 Peach on Saturday mornings between 9:00 am to 11:00 am. Episodes were then available to stream Amazon Prime Video on a week delay from 10's broadcast from 25 September 2023.

Network 10 scheduled a reduction in episodes per week to three between October and December 2024, which would have caused the Australian broadcast to fall behind international releases of new episodes, but reversed the change on the week it was due to be implemented owing to "Audience feedback".

=== International ===
Neighbours has been sold to more than 60 countries and is one of Australia's most successful media exports.

==== United Kingdom ====
Neighbours has been very successful in the United Kingdom, and has proved to be more popular there than in Australia. It was broadcast on BBC One for more than 21 years from October 1986 until February 2008. The series started airing on 27 October 1986, as part of BBC One's revamped daytime schedules. Neighbours went out with a lunchtime broadcast and then a morning broadcast repeat the following day. Michael Grade, the channel's then controller, was advised by his daughter to move the morning broadcast repeat to a late afternoon slot, as she and her friends kept missing it owing to their being at school, which took place from 4 January 1988. The show then started attracting larger audiences, peaking at more than 21 million viewers on 26 January 1990, an aggregated figure that combined the lunchtime debut and the teatime repeat. Towards the late 2000s, Neighbours was normally attracting an average of 3 million viewers for its lunchtime showing and 2.6 million viewers for its early-evening repeat. It was frequently the highest-rating daytime program in the UK, outside of news bulletins.

In 2008, the UK broadcast moved to rival channel Channel 5 following the BBC's decision not to keep the show after being asked to pay £300m over eight years by FremantleMedia (three times the show's usual fee). Both Channel 5 and FremantleMedia were owned at that time by the German RTL Group. The last Neighbours episode to be shown on BBC One aired on 8 February 2008. The first episode to be shown on Channel 5 was watched by 2.4 million viewers on 11 February 2008 (an audience share of 14.2%), a drop of 300,000 from the BBC's average. However, the move boosted Channel 5's usual share for the 5.30 pm slot by three and a half times. UK viewers are able to catch up with episodes with Channel 5's video catch up service, My5, similar to the catch up service in Australia. Channel 5 also had a deal with YouTube, allowing viewers to watch episodes for free on the video sharing site after they have been transmitted. From 4 January 2016, Channel 5 began broadcasting episodes on the same day as Australia. Channel 5's commissioning editor Greg Barnett explained that closing the transmission gap would reduce spoilers and the number of viewers watching the show illegally online. From mid-2016, the show also began airing every week-night on Nickelodeon as part of their Nick at Nite programming block, broadcasting the same episode that was seen earlier on Channel 5. In March 2017, it was reported that negotiations to continue Neighbours on Channel 5 had become "very fraught", and it was possible that the show could stop airing in Britain. In late 2021, Channel 5 moved Neighbours to a 6:00 pm timeslot, as it extended its news coverage to a one-hour-long broadcast from 5:00 pm. The 1:45 pm showing was unchanged.

On 5 February 2022, a report from The Sun, later confirmed by Digital Spy, stated that Neighbours had been cancelled in the UK after Channel 5 pulled its funding for budget reasons. In an official statement, a channel spokesperson said "Neighbours will no longer air on Channel 5 beyond this summer. It's been a much-loved part of our schedule for more than a decade, and we'd like to thank the cast, Fremantle and all of the production team for their fantastic work on this iconic series." Neighbours concluded on Channel 5 in July 2022. The channel's spokesperson confirmed that 5 wants to increase its investment in original UK dramas.

New episodes of Neighbours, along with archive episodes, began streaming on Amazon Freevee from 18 September 2023 in the United Kingdom.

In May 2026, it was reported that UKTV a parent company in the United Kingdom, secured a deal with Fremantle for the rights to Neighbours 420-episode or 2 series back catalogue. The first series began broadcasting in July 2026 on channel U&Drama and would have been the soaps 40th anniversary.

==== Elsewhere ====
In Ireland, RTÉ began broadcasting Neighbours on 2 January 2001. The show aired weekdays at 2:00 pm on RTÉ One and was repeated at 6:00 pm on RTÉ Two. Episodes were also available via catch-up on RTÉ Player. Prior to the move from BBC One to Channel 5 in the UK, RTÉ broadcast Neighbours at the same pace as the BBC. From the move to Channel 5, RTÉ sat one episode behind the UK broadcast. In 2007, RTÉ secured a long-term deal with FremantleMedia to continue broadcasting the show in Ireland after it moved from the BBC to Channel 5. While RTÉ had broadcast Neighbours since only 2001, it had already been popular with Irish viewers since it debuted on BBC One in October 1986. The finale was broadcast in Northern Ireland on 29 July 2022 and the Republic of Ireland on 3 August 2022. To mark the ending of the show, RTÉ had made several classic episodes available to viewers in Ireland on the RTÉ Player. Neighbours returned to RTÉ and debuted on Amazon Prime Video on 18 September 2023.

In New Zealand, Neighbours was broadcast primarily on the TVNZ network. The show was initially broadcast by TVNZ on 25 July 1988, but by 1996 it was removed from the schedule. TV4 (now Bravo) picked the show up and began broadcasting it from 1997. They dropped it in 2000 and it returned to TVNZ in 2002. Repeats of the previous day's episode of Neighbours were formerly shown at 2:30 pm weekdays, and later on TVNZ 2 at around 4:30 am Tuesdays to Fridays. The show moved to 5:25 pm weeknights on TV One in early 2007. After a couple of months, the show moved to 3:50 pm weekdays. The show eventually moved back to TV2, screening weeknights at 6:00 pm and, later, 6:30 pm before moving back to 6:00 pm. Its timeslot in 2022 was at 4:30 pm on TVNZ 1. The finale aired, in its 90-minute iteration as Neighbours: The Final Farewell, in a primetime slot on TVNZ 1, on 2 September 2022. Upon its return, Neighbours aired from 19 September 2023 at 5:30 pm Tuesdays to Fridays on TVNZ 2.

In Belgium, Neighbours has aired since 1988 as Buren, with Dutch subtitles on Één (previously known as TV1, in 2024 known as VRT1), the main TV network of VRT, the Flemish public broadcaster. On 14 June 2021, after more than 30 years on Eén, commercial broadcaster VTM 2 began broadcasting the series. On 1 February 2024, VTM 2 will broadcast episode 8903 of Neighbours, which was the last episode when the program was stopped in the summer of 2022. From 5 February 2024, Neighbours moved to Play 5 (later rebranded as Play Fictie) and GoPlay (later rebranded as Play) which continued the series from episode 8904.

In Iceland, Neighbours has been aired on Stöð 2 since 1986 with Icelandic subtitles. In Kenya, it is broadcast on the KTN network Monday to Friday at 12:30 pm with an omnibus on Sunday mornings. In Barbados, Neighbours is broadcast on the CBC8 channel at 1:00 pm Monday to Friday.

In Canada, CFMT-TV in Toronto broadcast Neighbours on weeknights at 11:00 pm, starting in September 1990. From 20 May 1991, CFMT moved the show to 4:00 pm. After announcing its cancellation, CFMT decided to keep Neighbours on its schedule throughout September 1994, following numerous letters and telephone calls. From April 2017 to April 2019, Neighbours aired on OutTV. Episodes were broadcast on weekdays at 2:30 pm ET and 5:30 pm ET, with an omnibus on Saturdays. Episodes aired on the same day as the Australian broadcast and were also available for streaming. From 18 September 2023, archived and new episodes began streaming on Amazon Prime Video.

In the United States, Neighbours premiered on KCOP-TV in Los Angeles on 3 June 1991 at 5:30 pm weekdays. KCOP planned to cancel the show by the end of the month owing to low ratings, but brought it back owing to viewer demand at a 9:30 am daily time slot from 1 July to 30 August 1991. New York City station WWOR-TV showed Neighbours weekdays 5:30 pm from 17 June to 17 September 1991. Sixty-five selected episodes were aired from the beginning to where Charlene leaves Ramsay Street in 1988 in both markets. In April 2004, the show began broadcasting nationally on the television channel Oxygen. A spokeswomen from the channel said "Now our viewers can join in on the good, the bad and the endlessly entertaining lives of our Aussie neighbours." The episodes started from the Scully family's arrival in 1999 and were aired for a six-week trial basis. The show was broadcast in the afternoon with two episodes being shown back to back at 1:00 pm and 2:00 pm. After a couple of weeks, and only 65 episodes aired, the show was moved to a late-night time slot and it eventually left the air. On 7 July 2014, Todd Spangler from Variety reported that FremantleMedia International had signed a deal with U.S. subscription service Hulu giving it exclusive rights to the most recent season of Neighbours. The soap began airing from 14 July, with new episodes airing daily from Monday through to Friday, on Hulu and Hulu Plus services. The episodes were four weeks behind the Australian broadcast. However, the show failed to capture an audience. From 18 September 2023, new episodes and archive episodes began streaming on Amazon Freevee.

== Popularity and viewership ==
=== 1985–1990s ===
Neighbours initially struggled to attract high ratings, leading to its cancellation by Seven Network. Upon its NetworkTen debut it initially attracted low ratings, so the Network worked hard to publicise the series. Ten's publicity drive was designed to promote the show in a star-focused campaign recalling that of the Hollywood star system where stars were packaged to feed into a fan culture. This paid off, and by the end of 1987, ratings had improved for the show. The episode featuring Scott and Charlene's wedding achieved the highest ever ratings for Neighbours, and it became one of the highest rating soap episodes ever in Australia. The same episode attracted 19.6 million viewers when it was aired in the United Kingdom - more than the entire population of Australia at the time.

By the early 1990s, Australian audiences had decreased, although viewing figures had recovered slightly by the end of the decade. In 1992, owing to the decline in ratings, producers overhauled the show to win back viewers. They brought in more "fresh-faced teens", moved out older characters and gave some of their parent characters "un-neighborly [sic] subplots". Executive producer Ian Bradley said the changes were an attempt to return to the show's original concept. In 1994, Di Stanley and Caron James of TV Week reported that Neighbours would be concentrating on "a younger, livelier look with six regular characters under the age of 18" and a new "brat pack" was created in a bid to generate interest.

In 1996, Kimberley Davies, who played Annalise Hartman, quit the series. Then Caroline Gillmer fell ill and her character Cheryl Stark was temporarily recast with former Prisoner actress Colette Mann. This made producers nervous that viewing figures might decrease, so they implemented a series of plots to keep viewers interested. These included a cameo from Clive James and an explosion, which destroyed the doctor's surgery in the Lassiter's complex.

=== 2000s ===
In the 2000s, fellow soap opera Home and Away became more popular than Neighbours in Australia. As of 2004, Neighbours was regularly attracting just under a million viewers per episode. In 2007, Home and Away was averaging 1.4 million viewers in Australia to Neighbours' 700,000. The show underwent a revamp that same year, and the episode broadcast on 23 July 2007 saw the introduction of a new family, updated sets, new theme music and graphics. Ratings for that episode averaged 1.05 million viewers in the 6:30 pm. slot. It was the first time the programme's viewing figures had topped 1 million in 2007. By the end of 2007 it was reported that producers had hoped the Neighbours revamp would push the ratings up to between 900,000 to 1 million an episode. It had, however, resulted in a more modest boost, with ratings hovering at about 800,000 a night. The same viewing period had shown an increase in ratings for Home and Away, which was now averaging 1.4 million viewers every night.

In February 2008, new executive producer Susan Bower implemented further changes and promised to return to traditional Neighbours values. Ratings rose to almost 900,000 in mid-2008, but generally ratings begin to fall towards the end of each year, usually averaging around 700,000. On 17 July 2009, during the aftermath of the Parker family's car accident and the dramatic death of Bridget Parker (Eloise Mignon), Neighbours achieved 998,000 viewers and placed 6th for the night, ahead of Home and Away in 7th.

=== 2010s ===
In January 2010, Neighbours returned to Australian screens to an audience of 563,000. On 20 January, the ratings fell to a low of 426,000, making it one of the program's lowest ever ratings in Australia. A July 2010 report showed figures had dropped 20%, from having 1.2 million viewers in 1991 to a low of 618,000 in 2010. On 29 October 2010, Neighbours' ratings dropped to a low figure of 386,000 viewers. Viewing numbers for Network Ten that night were down across all programmes. The show's highest figure of the week was 590,000 on 25 October 2010.

Following its move to digital multichannel Eleven, Neighbours rated between 250,000 and 350,000 viewers. The show attracted 254,000 viewers for its first episode broadcast on 11 January 2011. This was half the number of viewers that watched it on Network Ten; the Herald Sun reported that it was a good result as "bosses were only expecting 133,000". Neighbours became Eleven's most-watched show and the third highest rating show on digital multichannels that night. Programming chief David Mott stated, "Last night's strong result for Neighbours already suggests the audience will follow the folks from Ramsay Street to their brand new neighbourhood on Eleven." On 27 January 2011, Neighbours achieved 355,000 viewers, becoming the show's highest rating yet on Eleven at the time. The show had more viewers than the Ten Evening News in the 16–39 and 18–49 demographics. On 13 June 2011, Neighbours was watched by 455,000 viewers, making it the highest rating show on digital multichannels that night, and breaking its previous ratings record on the channel. On 27 May 2013, episode 6651 of Neighbours was watched by an audience of 405,000 viewers, which was the highest rating the series had achieved in nearly two years. Neighbours began going through a ratings decline in 2016, with episodes now averaging below 200,000 viewers. The first episode screened on Eleven in March 2018 gained only 118,000 viewers.

=== 2020s ===
In 2021, Neighbours audience figures were around 1.5 million per episode in the UK. The finale was viewed by 4.02 million viewers in the UK when catchup and recordings were counted. The original finale, which aired on Network 10 on 28 July 2022, was watched by a total of 1.2 million viewers (live viewers in Australia alone), making it the most-watched program of the evening. In September 2024, Neighbours ranked at number two on Amazon Prime and number one on Amazon Freevee in the UK.

== Storylines ==
Neighbours storylines frequently focus on family problems, intergenerational clashes, school problems, romances and domestic issues. Despite the restrictive 6:30 pm time slot, Neighbours has also covered many serious problems such as teenage pregnancy, marital breakdown, imprisonment, career problems, financial problems, pregnancy, abortion, terminal illness, eating disorders, alcoholism, adultery, drug use and drug trafficking, robbery, stalking, kidnapping, accidental death, hit-and-runs, murder, shootings, stabbings, and incest. In the 2000s and 2010s, the show dealt with issues such as homosexuality, gambling, prostitution, surrogacy, and exotic dancing. Health issues were also focused on, including multiple sclerosis, bipolar disorder, epilepsy, amnesia, congenital diaphragmatic hernia, and Alzheimer's disease. In September 2014, the show featured a natural disaster storyline, in which a tornado descended on Erinsborough and Ramsay Street.

== Characters ==
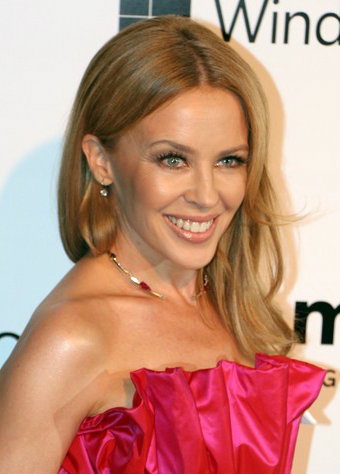
Kylie Minogue starred as Charlene Robinson from 1986 to 1988 and again in 2022.

In 1985, Neighbours started out with three households created by Watson – the Ramsays, the Robinsons and the Clarkes. Watson said that he wanted to show three families living in a small street, who are friends. Max Ramsay (Francis Bell), his wife Maria (Dasha Blahova) and their sons Shane (Peter O'Brien) and Danny (David Clencie) lived at No.24 Ramsay Street. Single father, Jim Robinson (Alan Dale) lived next door with his children, Paul (Stefan Dennis), Julie (Vikki Blanche), Scott (Darius Perkins) and Lucy (Kylie Flinker). His mother-in-law, Helen Daniels (Anne Haddy) also lived with him. Bachelor Des Clarke (Paul Keane) invited Daphne Lawrence (Elaine Smith) to live at No. 28 with him and they were later married. The Robinsons and the Ramsays had a long history in the street and they were often involved in an ongoing rivalry. When Network Ten picked up the show and revamped it, they brought in new and younger actors including Kylie Minogue as Charlene Mitchell and Jason Donovan, who replaced Darius Perkins as Scott Robinson. Many families, including the Alessi, Bishop, Hancock, Hoyland, Rebecchi, Scully, Timmins and Willis families have moved in and out of the street over the years.

When storylines for certain characters become tired, the scriptwriters simply move one family out and replace it with a new one. By the time Neighbours concluded, Ramsay Street was a mixture of older characters like Paul Robinson (Stefan Dennis), Toadfish Rebecchi (Ryan Moloney), and Karl (Alan Fletcher) and Susan Kennedy (Jackie Woodburne), as well as newer characters such as the Canning and Brennan families. Watson originally wanted to show young people communicating with older people, which means that the cast is a mix of young actors in their teens or early 20s and older, more experienced hands. The last remaining original character, Helen Daniels, departed the show in 1997 owing to the ill-health of Anne Haddy. In 2004, original cast member Stefan Dennis returned to Neighbours full-time as Paul Robinson. Paul was the only original character to be a regular in the series from this point until the final terrestrial episode.

In February 2009, it was announced that producers would be introducing a new generation of the Ramsay family to the show, more than a decade after the family had last appeared. Kate (Ashleigh Brewer), Harry (Will Moore) and Sophie Ramsay (Kaiya Jones) made their first appearances in May 2009.

As the show continued, more diverse sexualities and gender identities began to be explored. Following a number of gay male characters in the preceding decade, Lana Crawford (Bridget Neval) became the first lesbian character in 2004. In 2010, the first regular gay character, Chris Pappas (James Mason) was introduced. In 2018, Aaron Brennan (Matt Wilson) and David Tanaka (Takaya Honda) were married, the first same-sex marriage to feature in an Australian television drama following the legalisation of same-sex marriage in Australia. The first transgender character, Mackenzie Hargreaves (Georgie Stone), was introduced in late 2019, after Stone approached the producers with a pitch for the character.

Throughout recent years, the show has introduced a range of characters with varying disabilities, in order to create individuality and diversity on the screen. in 2021, they introduced the show's first ever deaf character Curtis Perkins (Nathan Borg), with Borg being the first actor with a cochlear implant to appear on Australian television. In 2022, the show debuted Sam Young (Henrietta Graham), who has down-syndrome, to create inclusiveity in the community.

=== Celebrity guest appearances ===
Throughout its run, Neighbours has featured several guest appearances from celebrities playing themselves or characters. Early cameos included former Skyhooks musician Red Symons, Warwick Capper, Molly Meldrum, Chris Lowe of Pet Shop Boys, and Clive James. During the 2000s and 2010s, the series featured appearances from The Wiggles, Shane Warne, former Spice Girls singer Emma Bunton, Little Britain's Matt Lucas and David Walliams, The Veronicas, Daryl Braithwaite, wrestler Dave Bautista, Lily Allen, Russell Brand (performing his own monologue), Katherine Kelly Lang, André Rieu, Paula Abdul and Jamie Lawson. Richard Quest appeared as himself in 2024, after the reporter travelled to the Neighbours set to film a news report about the show for CNN. In the report he also documents filming his cameo appearance.

== Theme tune ==
The theme tune to Neighbours was composed by Tony Hatch whose then wife, Jackie Trent, wrote the lyrics. Since 1985, there have been eight versions of the theme tune. Barry Crocker performed the song until 1992. The song has been voted the world's most recognised television theme song and the lyrics were quoted by John Smith, then British Shadow Chancellor, in a House of Commons debate on Government economic policy. From 2007, the theme tune to Neighbours was sung by Sandra de Jong. In February 2013, Network Ten and FremantleMedia announced that they were searching across Australia and the United Kingdom for a singer to record a new version of the theme tune. The competition resulted in a tie and the new theme was sung as a duet by Daniel Boys and Stephanie Angelini. That version of the theme tune began airing from 15 April 2013. A new retro-inspired theme tune sung by Garth Ploog debuted on 5 January 2015 as part of the show's 30th anniversary celebrations. A new version of the theme, sung by then-cast member Bonnie Anderson, debuted on 25 March 2020, and was used until the 2022 finale. Since 2023 the theme has been sung by Chris Sebastian.

== Titles ==
Since Neighbours began in 1985, it used its opening titles sequence to introduce the major characters featuring in the show. The sequences often feature the characters in family or domestic groups. Each episode's titles sequence was preceded by a recap of events from recent episodes featuring the characters who were to appear in the new episode.

In 2002, Neighbours debuted an all new style of titles with a remixed version of the theme tune. The titles showed characters together in groups according to gender and against a standardised backdrop, a change from the previous ones which were taken outside. The previous style was restored in May of the same year. 2007 saw Neighbours debut an updated theme, a new logo and new "optimistic, contemporary" titles. A photo booth montage was played and characters were seen rowing boats, walking along piers and eating outside. In August 2009, Neighbours introduced a new titles format. The first episode of each week began with a trailer previewing the week's events. The usual recap of storylines switched to after the opening titles for the first time since 1998. The end of episode teasers returned and were made in-house by the Neighbours production team.

Neighbours introduced new opening titles for the 25th anniversary on 18 March 2010. The titles were created by Visual Playground and feature the cast in settings familiar to viewers. A new set of opening titles made their debut on 15 April 2013, along with a new version of the theme tune. Visual Playground once again created and produced the titles. The titles depict the Ramsay Street residents gathering outside their houses for a street party. Visual Playground used "a bokeh graphic device" and six "overlapping circles" represent the houses of Ramsay Street and "reinforce the sense of community". A new retro-inspired logo, theme tune and opening titles debuted on 5 January 2015 as part of the show's 30th anniversary celebrations. The logo was a reimagined contemporary version of the original Neighbours logo from 1985. The titles showed characters in a variety of settings around Erinsborough and end with a shot of Ramsay Street from above.

On 9 January 2017, a new set of opening titles debuted featuring the cast members posing in front of green screen, instead of on the sets, with the intention of reflecting cast changes more immediately. Actors Ryan Moloney, Colette Mann and Zoe Cramond had their names misspelled, but they were soon corrected and debuted the following day. Further revisions took place in April, following the arrival of the new Rebecchi family. On 21 May 2018, the titles returned to the style of live-action sequences filmed on the set. This style remained with periodic updates in subsequent years. In January 2022, new location shots of Melbourne and its surroundings were introduced to the title sequence, reflecting the series' ambition to expand its filming locations.

When the series returned in September 2023, a new title sequence debuted. Minor differences were featured in the titles between the Australian broadcast and episodes shown via Amazon Freevee, which Herbison described as "a fun curio for the fans". The new titles also introduced a group shot of the entire main cast at the end of the sequence, initially showing a pool party and later moved to Lassiters Lake.

== Awards and nominations ==
Neighbours has received a wide variety of awards and nominations throughout its run. The show has received 89 Logie Award nominations, of which it has won 31. It was inducted into the Logie Hall of Fame in 2005. It has also been nominated for "Most Popular Daytime Programme" at the UK's National Television Awards in five of the six years from 2000 to 2006. In 1997, the show won an award for Best Episode in A Television Drama Serial at the Australian Film Institute Awards. Two Neighbours actors have been nominated for Rose D'Or awards, once in 2004 for Ryan Moloney and again in 2005 for Jackie Woodburne. Neighbours has also won six Australian Writers' Guild awards. In 2024, Neighbours was nominated in the "Daytime Drama Series" category at the Daytime Emmy Awards in the USA, in its first year of eligibility.

== Home media and spin-offs ==
Since the show's inception, several spin-offs have been produced, including books, music, DVDs and internet webisodes. In 1991, an officially licensed video game of Neighbours was created by Ian Copeland and developed by Zeppelin Games under their Impulze label for the ZX Spectrum, Commodore 64, Atari ST, and Amiga; it was re-released by Zeppelin in 1992 on budget price. In the game, the player took on the role of Scott Robinson and had to skateboard around four whole courses.

Episodes of Neighbours have been released on several DVDs. Neighbours: Defining Moments was the first DVD box set released in 2002. It is a compilation of 15 classic episodes and a photo gallery. The Neighbours: The Iconic Episodes Volume 1 DVD box set was released in 2008 and contains 23 episodes, the 1000th episode party celebration special and a photo gallery. Neighbours: The Iconic Episodes Volume Two contains 24 episodes over three discs. One disc is dedicated to the character of Charlene. In 2012, early episodes of Neighbours were released on three DVD box sets in Germany. From April 2012, Shock Entertainment began releasing DVD box sets of Neighbours episodes in broadcast order from the beginning. As of October 2014, five box sets have been released.

Neighbours has released several internet webisode series via their YouTube channel. The first series was titled Steph in Prison and coincided with Stephanie Scully's (Carla Bonner) return to Neighbours in April 2013. The following year, Brennan on the Run focusing on Mark Brennan's (Scott McGregor) time in witness protection was released. Neighbours vs Zombies was launched in October 2014 and featured the returns of many former characters who had previously died in the show. In October 2017, the five-part Neighbours vs Time Travel series was released. It features Paul Robinson (Stefan Dennis) going back to 1985 and giving his younger self some advice, which alters the future.

The first full-length spin-off, a five-part series entitled Neighbours: Erinsborough High, was distributed on video on demand and catch up TV services My5 and 10 Play in November 2019.

== International versions and co-operations ==
The serial's format has occasionally been licensed to international networks by the original producers Reg Grundy Organisation/Fremantle. Based on the Neighbours story and character outlines from 2012, Komşular began screening in Turkey in 2017.

The Italian serial Un posto al sole (English: A Place in the Sun) was inspired by the Neighbours format, and features storylines stemming from neighbouring families. It is also produced by the Reg Grundy Organisation.

== Cultural impact ==
=== Parody ===
Kenny Everett parodied the show in the final series of The Kenny Everett Television Show (1987–88). Titled Cobbers, the sketches featured a group of stereotypical Australians dressed in swimwear conflicting with Everett's suit-wearing middle class British personality. The Red Dwarf episode "Kryten" (1988) included a scene where the android character Kryten watched an episode of the fictional TV series Androids, which had a theme tune clearly resembling that of Neighbours, including the lyrics 'Androids, everybody needs good androids. Androids should be good and should be true. Androids, though we're only made of metal, Androids have feelings, Androids have feelings, Androids have feelings too'.

=== Language ===
Neighbours has been cited as the cause of language change in the United Kingdom. The adoptions of Australian colloquialisms such as "no worries" Australian speech patterns and the high rising terminal, sometimes called "Australian Question Intonation", have been linked to the popularity of Neighbours in Britain. Researchers, however, are uncertain about the origins of this mode of speech, which was labelled "Uptalk" in 1993. Linguist Robin Lakoff was taking interest in this speech pattern, which was already discernible, in the US in 1975. Other linguists have stated that its origins are impossible to 'nail down' and almost certainly pre-date the 20th Century - and could even date back as far as the 9th Century.

== See also ==
- Television in Australia
- List of longest-running Australian television series
