= List of Neighbours characters introduced in 2007 =

Neighbours is an Australian television soap opera that was first broadcast on 18 March 1985. The following is a list of characters that first appeared on the show in 2007, by order of first appearance. All characters were introduced by the show's executive producer Ric Pellizzeri. The 23rd season of Neighbours began airing from 8 January 2007. That month saw both Ringo Brown and Oliver Barnes introduced as brothers of established characters. March saw the year's first baby, Holly Hoyland, born. Con artists Terrence Chesterton and Charlotte Stone arrived the following month, along with Mary Casey. June saw the debuts of Prue Brown, Adam Rhodes, Kirsten Gannon and Mickey Gannon. Oliver's mother and brother, Rebecca and Declan Napier, were introduced in July, as were Bridget Parker, Miranda Parker, Steve Parker and Peggy Newton. Justin Hunter, Richard Aaronow and Riley Parker began appearing from August. September saw Brad Jordan arrive, while October saw the introductions of Marco Silvani, Josh Taylor, Taylah Jordan and Jessica Wallace. Both Angus Henderson and Mia Silvani arrived in November.

== Ringo Brown ==
Ringo Brown, played by Sam Clark, made his first screen appearance on 24 January 2007. Clark was cast in the role after he won a competition hosted by teen magazine Dolly. Clark was signed to a three-month contract to play the part of Ringo. Clark auditioned four times in total before being cast. His contract was later extended from the initial three months to nine months. The actor described Ringo as being "a good-hearted kid", who does the normal things that a 16-year-old does. Clark explained that Ringo left home to come and live the life his brother, Frazer (Ben Lawson) is living. A writer for the official Neighbours website described Ringo as someone who had "often drawn the short straw in life". They pointed out that he was not an academic, but cheeky and good-humoured. Ringo had previously suffered with anorexia in the past and one of his first major storylines saw him suffer a relapse.

== Oliver Barnes ==
Oliver Barnes, played by David Hoflin, made his first screen appearance on 30 January 2007. Hoflin's casting was announced in October 2006. Hoflin originally auditioned for the role of Will Griggs (later played by Christian Clark), but was forced to turn down the part as he was working on a pilot for another Network Ten production. When that show was not picked up, Hoflin was offered the role of Oliver Barnes, Will's brother. A writer for the soap's official website described Oliver as being "Honest, forthright and fun-loving". They added that unlike Will he has a big heart. Oliver showed his manipulative side when he teamed up with girlfriend Elle Robinson (Pippa Black) to con her father, Paul (Stefan Dennis), out of ownership of his business. Hoflin earned nominations for Sexiest Male and Best Couple, along with Natalie Blair, at the 2007 Inside Soap Awards.

== Holly Hoyland ==
Holly Hoyland
- Neighbours character
- Portrayed by: Chaya Broadmore (2007); Lucinda Armstrong Hall (2013–2025)
- Duration: 2007, 2013–2014, 2017–2018, 2023–2025
- First appearance: 29 March 2007
- Last appearance: 11 December 2025
- Introduced by: Ric Pellizzeri (2007); Richard Jasek (2013); Jason Herbison (2014)
In-universe information
- Occupation: Student; Lassiters Hotel employee
- Family: Kennedy
- Father: Karl Kennedy
- Mother: Izzy Hoyland
- Stepmother: Susan Kennedy
- Half-brothers: Malcolm Kennedy; Billy Kennedy
- Half-sisters: Libby Kennedy
- Uncles: Max Hoyland
- Aunts: Jemima Davies-Smythe
- Nephews: Ben Kirk; Jackson Kennedy
- Nieces: Susannah Kennedy
- First cousins: Boyd Hoyland; Summer Hoyland; Charlie Hoyland; Trudy Callhoun; Elly Conway (step); Bea Nilsson (step)
- Other relatives: Jasper Callhoun; Aster Conway (step)

Holly Hoyland made her first screen appearance on 29 March 2007. She was originally played by Chaya Broadmore and then Lucinda Armstrong Hall when the character was recast and reintroduced in 2013. Holly is Karl Kennedy (Alan Fletcher) and Izzy Hoyland's (Natalie Bassingthwaighte) daughter, who was born on a boat on the River Thames. Karl did not know he was Holly's father, until his wife, Susan (Jackie Woodburne), told him. Izzy initially did not want Karl to have a part in Holly's life and Susan agreed with her. Woodburne commented "A child is such a strong connection, and Susan's thinking Karl might decide to try and win Izzy back and make a family with this new child. Susan's quite relieved when Izzy doesn't want Karl involved. She thinks, 'I've told him about the situation and Izzy will look after the child in a happy, loving relationship with her boyfriend, Pete (Daniel Schutzmann), so everyone comes out a winner."

In May 2013, Fletcher revealed that someone from Karl's past would be coming back into his life in the coming months. Fletcher also explained that the new storyline would enable him to make more trips to London, after Karl vows to visit the city at least twice a year. Sophie Dainty from Digital Spy said that this supported the theory that Holly would be returning to the show, following the release of a picture showing a new addition to the portrait at the Kennedy family's house. In June, it was confirmed that Holly would be returning with Lucinda Armstrong Hall in the role. When Holly arrives in Erinsborough, she is now "a precocious eight-year-old", who can do no wrong by Karl. However, Susan's resolve is tested by Holly's behaviour towards her. Claire Crick from All About Soap branded the character "Horrid Holly" and commented "Blimey – we've only seen about five minutes of Holly in Ramsay Street and we hate her already! Could she be any more annoying? We don't think so!" Crick went on to call Holly a "mini-diva", adding that "Horrid Holly better do something to make us like her – and fast!" On 11 March 2014, it was announced that Holly would be returning to Neighbours and she returned on 30 May. Holly made a brief appearance in 2017, and returned alongside Izzy in early 2018. In May 2023, it was announced that the character would return again when Neighbours resumed. The character demonstrates soap opera rapid aging syndrome: six years after her on-screen birth, Hall's casting saw Holly's age increased to eight, and nine years after this her age had advanced again to nineteen. In 2025, Holly and Andrew Rodwell's (Lloyd Will) "controversial affair" received a "Best Soap Storyline" nomination at the Digital Spy Reader Awards.

Izzy Hoyland becomes pregnant after she has a one-night stand with her ex-partner, Karl Kennedy. When she discovers her pregnancy, Izzy leaves Erinsborough. Eight months later in London, Izzy runs into Karl and his wife, Susan. Susan helps Izzy reunite with her boyfriend, Pete, and he urges her to tell Karl the truth about the baby. The following day, Izzy watches as Karl and Susan are remarried on a boat on the Thames and she goes into labour. Karl delivers their daughter and Izzy names her Holly. Deciding not to ruin Karl and Susan's day, Izzy keeps quiet about Holly's paternity. However, Susan overhears Izzy and Pete talking and she tells Karl once they return home. Izzy initially asks Karl to stay out of Holly's life, but he flies back to London to spend time with her. Susan later agrees to become Holly's godmother and Karl tries to visit her as often as he can.

When Izzy goes on a cruise with her new partner, she puts Holly on a plane to send her to stay with Karl and Susan. Holly is happy to see her father again and spend time with him. However, she makes her dislike of Susan clear by glaring at her and calling her old. Holly later admits to Karl that she is missing Izzy. Susan rebukes Holly when she spills nail polish on the couch. Holly believes Susan hates her because of who her mother is, but Karl tells her that is not true and asks her to make an effort with Susan. Holly draws a picture of her mother and crosses her out, causing Karl to realise that she is angry at Izzy. When Holly tries to add a picture of herself to the Kennedy portrait, she falls from the stool she is standing on, hurting her knee. Karl tends to the injury and learns that Holly wants to be part of the family. Holly later tells Karl that she is worried that Susan does not like her, but Karl assures her that is not the case. Susan sits her down and explains to her that despite their rocky start, she does care about her. They both admit to being scared of each other at first and decide to give each other a chance. Holly then admits that she wants to stay with Karl and Susan. When Karl tells Holly that Izzy is letting her stay for longer, Holly believes that she does not want her. Holly tells Karl and Susan that she wants to go back home and Karl flies to London with her.

Holly returns the following year, after Susan organises a surprise visit for Karl. After Holly sings with Karl, he realises she has a good singing voice and he enters her into a junior talent competition. After she witnesses the judges criticising another contestant, Holly becomes nervous and runs off stage. Karl assures her that she does not have to sing in public if she does not want to. Holly recognises a man from a CCTV still as Victor Cleary (Richard Sutherland), a friend of her mother's, who becomes the prime suspect in Kate Ramsay's (Ashleigh Brewer) murder. Holly is delighted when she gets to spend some time with her half sister, Libby (Kym Valentine), and nephew, Ben (Felix Mallard), before she leaves. When Karl comes to London three years later, he brings Holly to visit Toadfish Rebecchi (Ryan Moloney) in the hospital, before taking her to see her friend. Later that year, Karl flies out to London on Christmas Day to be with Holly after Izzy absconds with a new partner.

Izzy returns to Erinsborough with Holly for Toadie's belated 21st birthday party. Holly visits her mother in the hospital, after Susan accidentally strikes Izzy with her car. Izzy tells Holly that their £41 million inheritance has come through. Karl and Susan are pleased to see Holly, but Izzy's presence causes a rift in their relationship. Izzy asks Karl to father another child with her, so Holly will have a full sibling. Holly becomes concerned when Karl and Susan's marriage is strained by Izzy's request. She later learns that Izzy has told Karl that she will take back her donation to the new hospital wing if he refuses her request. Holly learns Karl has taken part in a fertility trial as part of a research project and tells Izzy, who then steals his sperm sample to impregnate herself. Holly gets drunk with some male school friends, and Karl and Susan bring her back to Izzy's hotel room, where Holly blackmails Izzy into donating the money to the hospital. Izzy congratulates Holly for setting her up.

Holly gets drunk again and passes out. After losing her money, Izzy returns to London, leaving Holly with Karl and Susan. Holly starts work experience at the hospital, but after learning that Karl has lost his job, she steals research papers to help him out and is fired. Holly is selected to go on a six-month exchange trip to China after applying in secret. But Karl refuses to let her go until Susan tells him that Holly has never felt validated and will resent him if he makes her stay. Karl changes his mind and makes Holly promise to visit Izzy first and to stay in regular contact with him while she is in China. When Izzy returns to Erinsborough four years later, she tells Harold Bishop (Ian Smith) that Holly is now studying medicine. Karl later calls Holly to confirm that she will move to Erinsborough if Izzy and Malcolm Kennedy (Benjamin McNair), who are now a couple, also do.

When Neighbours recommenced in September 2023, Holly had returned to Erinsborough and moved into number 28 Ramsay Street with Karl and Susan, formed a friendship group with Sadie Rodwell (Emerald Chan) and Mackenzie Hargreaves (Georgie Stone) and taken a job at Lassiters Hotel. Mackenzie meets Eden Shaw (Costa D'Angelo) at The Waterhole, whom Holly realizes is her ex-boyfriend. Holly, Mackenzie, Sadie and Mackenzie's housemate Haz Devkar (Shiv Palekar) go out for some drinks to the bar where Eden works, and he spots her with Mackenzie and waits until she is gone before going up to say hello. When Holly returns to see Eden with Mackenzie, Eden runs away and Holly reveals that Eden, who was calling himself Ed, was her ex-boyfriend. The four friends all go to the bar to get some more drinks and come back to find that their bags, wallets and Mackenzie's rings were missing. Holly and Haz go to an address they believe Eden is staying at and they find all the stolen belongings except the rings, before Eden locks Holly in the shed, punches Haz in the eye and escapes before the police arrive.

Holly and Haz go to help Toadie Rebecchi and his wife Terese Willis (Rebekah Elmaloglou) to find Toadie's daughter Nell Rebecchi (Ayisha Salem-Towner), who left school going to the house where she believed her former stepmother Melanie Pearson (Lucinda Cowden) is living. Holly and Haz find Nell who had been knocked out by Eden, and help her to a nearby park bench. Nell describes to Holly what the man that knocked her out looked like, and Holly realized instantly that she was referring to Eden. When Melanie arrives to find Nell with Holly and Haz, Holly quickly asks her how she knows Eden Shaw, and Melanie responds with the same question. The four head back to Ramsay Street and Melanie explains through flashback scenes that she knew Eden's apparent girlfriend Krista Sinclair (Majella Davis). Holly then reveals that she and Eden had secretly been in Erinsborough during Izzy's last visit, and she saw her mother conducting an affair with Shane Ramsay (Peter O'Brien). They meet Krista, who is calling herself Kelly Miller, and the three decide to go travelling together. Eden then had an affair with Krista which led to Holly leaving Eden and ending the three's friendship, after which she moved in with Karl. Later, Krista is believed to have died after being pushed into a pool by Melanie on top of Lassiters roof. Melanie's friend Paul Robinson (Stefan Dennis) goes up to the scene to find Eden, who appears to have removed the body.

Concurrently, Reece Sinclair (Mischa Barton) discovers that Holly knew Krista after seeing them in a photo together. Reece approaches Holly asking where her sister was, and Holly tells her that Krista is dead. Later, Holly and Haz go to an abandoned house that Eden has been hiding in. They find him and trap him in his van when trying to escape. Several minutes later, police officer Andrew Rodwell (Lloyd Will) comes and arrests Eden. Holly then sees Krista's cardigan in Eden's van, and goes into the house looking for her, hoping that she could still be alive. Then Holly discovers Krista in on a mattress in the basement. Krista is taken to the hospital and then stays in a room in Lassiters Hotel. Soon after, Holly accidentally tells Krista that her father has died after Reece telling everyone to keep it from her.

Holly and Haz hook up and they start hanging out on a more than friends level. Holly then finds out from Haz's housemate and her friend Byron Stone (Xavier Molyneux) that Mackenzie is also romantically attracted to Haz and Holly becomes jealous. Holly and Mackenzie get into a massive argument after Holly rips up the scarf that Mackenzie knitted and gave to Haz for Christmas, and blames it on Haz's dog Trevor. When fighting with Mackenzie after the street Christmas party, Holly trips backwards into the swimming pool and a piece of her clothing becomes caught under the Christmas tree that had previously fallen into the water, which left her stuck under the water, unable to reach the surface.

The following year, Holly unintentionally leaks information regarding the poisoning at the Eirini Rising launch to a podcast, which casts suspicion on Leo Tanaka (Tim Kano) and causes his business to suffer. Hoping to make amends, she becomes obsessed with finding the true perpetrator, leading to her being kidnapped by the culprit, Gavin Bowman (Cameron MacDonald), until he is caught and arrested. Subsequently, Holly takes solace in an active party lifestyle, and is angry when Mackenzie prompts Karl to stage an intervention. She then meets Heath Royce (Ethan Panizza) at Lassiters, and they embark on a secret relationship, despite his relationship with Tess Carmichael (Anica Calida); Holly is unaware of their plans to embezzle money from the Sinclair Group. Holly joins Heath on a trip to the outback, where she is horrified to discover that Heath is keeping Toadie and Melanie hostage after they discovered his plans; Heath tries to kill the group, but Holly ultimately escapes and pushes Heath into a lake in self-defence, where he is mauled to death by a crocodile. Upon returning to Erinsborough, Holly discovers money that Heath has hidden and decides to keep it; this is later exposed when she, Paul, Susan, and Felix Rodwell (James Beaufort) are taken hostage by Heath's associate Justin Ashton (Richard Sutherland) who is attempting to recover the money. After Justin's arrest, Holly confesses to the theft but is ultimately able to avoid criminal charge. She suffers from severe PTSD caused by the siege and ends up bonding with Felix as he guides her through recovery, resulting in the two forming a friendship which ends after Felix leaves Erinsborough.

Several months later, Holly returns to the podcast to tell of her ordeal in the Outback, but is horrified when it implies that she murdered Heath. Shortly afterwards, Yasmine Shields (Chrishell Stause) arrives in Erinsborough to prepare the Lights Up festival; Yaz encourages Holly to leave her job at the hotel to help her work on the festival. It is soon revealed that Yaz is Heath's sister and has returned to get revenge on Holly for Heath's death. After failing to convince the police to re-open the investigation, Yaz instructs Holly to work on some faulty lights so that she will electrocute herself during the festival; however, Holly's nemesis Max Ramsay (Ben Jackson) falls victim to it instead. Holly is horrified when Yaz's true identity is exposed and feuds with Nicolette Stone (Hannah Monson) when she discovers Nic helped Yaz flee the country.

Holly bonds with Max after the accident and the two realise they have romantic feelings for each other, though Holly decides not to pursue this when she discovers Max is on the run from Carter Haddon after he spiked her drink. Despite this, she remains the only one worried when Max is kidnapped by Carter, though is relieved when he returns to Erinsborough and helps him hide in Lassiter's.

== Terrence Chesterton ==
Terrence Chesterton
- Neighbours character
- Portrayed by: Scott Johnson
- First appearance: 6 April 2007
- Last appearance: 11 May 2007
- Introduced by: Ric Pellizzeri
In-universe information
- Occupation: Con artist

Terrence Chesterton, played by Scott Johnson, made his first on-screen appearance on 6 April 2007. Terrence and his partner Charlotte Stone, arrived in Erinsborough to con the residents. Terrence posed as a spiritual advisor and Charlotte as a doctor. Terrence was later killed by Charlotte.

Following the death of her boyfriend, Stingray (Ben Nicholas), Sky Mangel (Stephanie McIntosh) is contacted by Terrence. He asks to meet her and she agrees. Her grandfather, Harold Bishop (Ian Smith), goes with her and Terrence gains his trust. He tells them that he was going to be a lawyer, but decided to use his "gift" to help people. Terrence comes to see Sky at her house and her tells her that Stingray is with Harold's late wife and his daughter. Harold starts to believe Terrence, but he is disappointed when Terrence tells Sky that she has a "gift". Sky starts seeing Terrence in secret, until they are caught by Harold. Terrence sends Sky to the new doctor, Charlotte Stone (Rachel Gordon). Everyone is unaware that Terrence and Charlotte are a pair of con artists. Charlotte was feeding Terrence with information from patient histories and medical records.

Terrence organises a group reading at the General Store. He worries Susan Kennedy (Jackie Woodburne), Toadfish Rebecchi (Ryan Moloney) and Lou Carpenter (Tom Oliver) when he mentions their dead partners. Terrence grows closer to Sky and he pretends that Stingray's spirit was inside him. They end up having sex and he falls out with Charlotte over his actions. Sky becomes suspicious and lies about a trip she and Stingray were planning to take. Terrence falls for it and Sky angrily lashes out and hits him with a sugar dispenser. She leaves him unconscious in the General Store and Charlotte finds him. Terrence starts to wake up and threatens to expose their scam. Charlotte hits him again and this time he dies.

For his portrayal of Terrence, Johnson received a nomination for Best Bad Boy at the 2007 Inside Soap Awards.

== Mary Casey ==
Mary Casey
- Neighbours character
- Portrayed by: Rowena Wallace
- First appearance: 10 April 2007
- Last appearance: 31 May 2007
- Introduced by: Ric Pellizzeri
In-universe information
- Sons: Kevin Casey

Mary Casey, played by Rowena Wallace, made her first appearance on 10 April 2007. Marcus Casey of The Daily Telegraph reported that Wallace was contracted for three months. He also reported that Wallace's character would "cause havoc among the residents of Ramsay Street" and dubbed her "Scary Mary". Casey was pleased to see Wallace back on screen, as there are few roles for older women in television.

When Pepper Steiger (Nicky Whelan) begins receiving gifts from an anonymous stalker, she believes they are from Kevin Casey (Zen Ledden), her high school boyfriend. Pepper and her father, Allan Steiger (Joe Clements), visit Mary to find out if she knows where Kevin is. Mary tells them that she has not seen Kevin. It is soon revealed that Mary is Pepper's stalker. Mary blamed Pepper for miscarrying her grandchild and she became obsessed with Pepper. Unaware that Mary was the one stalking her, Pepper visits Mary again and Mary give Pepper a piece of cake that she had spiked. Pepper is rushed to the hospital, but she recovers. During another visit, Pepper finally realises that Mary is her stalker. Mary knocks her unconscious and locks her in a nursery set up for the baby. Mary began pretending that Pepper was still seventeen and she shows her clothes that she has knitted for the baby. Pepper pleads with Mary to let her go, but a deranged Mary tells Pepper that she needs to grow up. Pepper is allowed to make a phone call and she tries to call her mother. However, she gets Janae Timmins (Eliza Taylor-Cotter) instead. Pepper tries to drop hints that she is not safe, but Janae does not notice them.

Mary bails Kevin out of jail and locks him in the nursery with Pepper. Kevin is shocked to find Pepper there and he pretends to be as mad as Mary to get Pepper out of the house. They eventually escape by setting the room on fire and getting Mary to open the door. Mary is then sent to jail. While she is there, Sky Mangel (Stephanie McIntosh) becomes Mary's new cellmate. Mary befriends Sky and after learning that Sky has a baby daughter, she convinces Sky to bring Kerry into the prison. Sky lets Mary look after her daughter for a moment and a riot started by Krystal McCoy (Freya Neilson) breaks out. Mary and the baby go missing, but Sky eventually finds them. Mary tells her that she had put the baby somewhere safe. Mary tells Sky about kidnapping Pepper and admits she needs help. Mary is then transferred out of the prison.

== Charlotte Stone ==
Charlotte Stone
- Neighbours character
- Portrayed by: Rachel Gordon
- First appearance: 12 April 2007
- Last appearance: 5 June 2007
- Introduced by: Ric Pellizzeri
In-universe information
- Occupation: Con artist

Charlotte Stone, played by Rachel Gordon, made her first on-screen appearance on 12 April 2007. She, along with Terrence Chesterton (Scott Johnson), arrived in Erinsborough to con the residents. Charlotte was called a "villain" by The Advertiser.

Charlotte arrives in Erinsborough as the town's new doctor, shortly after "spiritualist" Terrence Chesterton arrived. Charlotte sets up a practice in the Lassiter's complex and uses her position to give Terrence information on his clients. Medical student Boyd Hoyland (Kyal Marsh) becomes Charlotte's receptionist. Charlotte's first patient is Carmella Cammeniti (Natalie Blair), who is depressed following her split with her boyfriend. Charlotte prescribes anti-depressants and Carmella later finds herself addicted to them. Charlotte treats Paul Robinson (Stefan Dennis), who is suffering from dizzy spells and headaches. Charlotte is unsure how to treat him and she tells him that it is due to stress. She then gives him a massage and takes his credit card details. Her plans to take his money fail when she finds out that his money and business has been taken by his daughter. Charlotte later agrees to refer him to a neurologist. Charlotte sees her old boyfriend, Frazer Yeats (Ben Lawson), and she manages to convince him that she had undergone medical training. Charlotte decides that she wants Frazer back, but her plan fails when Frazer turns her down.

Charlotte learns that Terrence slept with Sky Mangel (Stephanie McIntosh) and she worries that he is going to ruin their plans. Sky discovers that Terrence is a con man and she hits him with a sugar dispenser, which knocks him out. Charlotte finds him and when he starts to come to, he tells her that he is going to the police. Charlotte hits Terrence again and kills him. She later learns that Sky has been arrested for his murder. Rosetta Cammeniti (Natalie Saleeba) is worried about Carmella and threatens to report Charlotte to the medical board. Charlotte kisses Boyd and he invites her to a dinner party. Charlotte struggles to answer Karl Kennedy's (Alan Fletcher) questions and Karl begins to think she is a fake. Karl notices Charlotte's medical certificates and a paperweight, which reminds him of a friend. Karl finds out that his friend's paperweight was stolen and everyone realises that Charlotte is a fake. Boyd also discovers the truth and decides to run away with Charlotte, so he can get the truth about Terrence's death out of her. Charlotte confesses all to Boyd, who records it on his MP3 player. Charlotte crashes the car and they are taken to the hospital, where Boyd tells the police about her confession. Charlotte is then sent to prison.

== Prue Brown ==
Prue Brown
- Neighbours character
- Portrayed by: Penny Cook
- Duration: 2007–2008, 2010
- First appearance: 19 June 2007
- Last appearance: 25 August 2010
- Introduced by: Ric Pellizzeri (2007); Susan Bower (2010)
In-universe information
- Husband: Graham Brown
- Sons: Johnny Brown; Frazer Yeats; Paul Brown; Ringo Brown
- Daughters: Pauline Brown
- Grandsons: Marco Yeats

Prue Brown, played by Penny Cook, made her first appearance on 19 June 2007. That year saw Neighbours suffer a decline in ratings and in an attempt to lure back viewers, several key changes took place, including introducing a new family and casting Cook as Prue Brown. Prue is the mother of established characters, Ringo Brown (Sam Clark) and Frazer Yeats (Ben Lawson). Cook described her character as a "nice mum who's had a past. There have been issues with the kids. They're from a farming background". She also added that Prue is a little similar to herself. In June 2010, it was announced that Cook was to reprise her role of Prue for Ringo's wedding in August, which coincided with the show's 6000th episode celebrations. Neighbours bosses also said that Prue was going to fall for another of the show's guest stars.

Prue and her husband Graham Brown (David Murray) had four children; Johnny (Phillip McInnes), George, Pauline and Ringo. In December 1985, Prue's youngest son, Paul, drowned in the swimming pool when he was 13 months old. A three-year-old George saw the accident, but was too young to help. Prue and Graham were alarmed that he had watched Paul drown and as a result they struggled to get close to him. George left home when he was a teenager and he changed his name to Frazer Yeats. He later became engaged to Johnny's ex-girlfriend Rosetta Cammeniti (Natalie Saleeba). Ringo arrives in Ramsay Street looking for Frazer and he ends up living with him. Frazer is paralyzed by an accident and he goes to visit his grandparents' graves, where he finds a small memorial to Paul. He then confronts Prue about Paul, but she refuses to talk about what happened. Frazer and Rosie go to see Prue as they are convinced that Paul's death might be the key to Frazer's problems. Prue finally tells Frazer about Paul and admits that she had blamed Frazer for his death. They then go to Erinsborough to explain everything to Ringo. A few weeks later, Prue returns with Graham and Johnny (now Lawrence Price), for Frazer's wedding to Rosie. Ringo is left in a coma following a bus crash and Prue makes regular visits to the hospital. She is relieved when Ringo wakes up. Ringo decides to move back home with Prue for a while and Frazer joins them. A week later, Frazer and Ringo go back to Ramsay Street.

Ringo develops an eating disorder and Frazer realises that he cannot deal with it alone, so he calls Prue. She tells Ringo that she is not going to let his problem continue and gives him the choice to either stay in Erinsborough or come back to Muttatang. Ringo agrees to make an appointment with the school counsellor. Ringo starts to grow distant and Prue worries that she might lose another son. Ringo hears Prue telling Graham that they have to cancel their cruise as she could not leave Ringo. Ringo gets Rosie to draw up a legal document, promising that he would eat. Prue then leaves for her cruise. Rosie and Frazer discover that they are expecting a baby and decide to go to Italy. Prue demands that Ringo come home with her. Ringo's eating disorder comes back and he almost drowns in an accident. Prue tells Frazer that he is not doing a good job of looking after Ringo. She then admits that she still blames him for Paul's death. Prue admits to Susan Kennedy (Jackie Woodburne) that she feels like she constantly drives her children away. Frazer confronts his mother again and she tells him that she would always blame him for what happened to Paul. Frazer tells her that she is no longer a part of his life. Frazer and Prue eventually make up and Rosie and Frazer drive Prue home.

Prue comes back to town for Ringo's wedding to Donna Freedman (Margot Robbie). She arrives at Charlie's during the middle of Ringo's bucks night and sees Ringo tied to a chair by some dancers. Prue and Donna get off to a bad start, when Prue walks through the door just as Donna throws a garter at it. Donna tries to impress Prue with a posh tea service, but she eventually decides to be herself. Prue, Donna and Kate Ramsay (Ashleigh Brewer) go out for cocktails and bond. Prue does not get along with Donna's father Nick and they insult and argue with each other. Donna goes to Prue's hotel room and finds her father there. Prue explains that they are now friends. On the morning of the wedding, Donna tells Ringo that his mother and her father had sex. Ringo confronts Prue and she tells him that she and Graham split up months ago.

== Mickey Gannon ==
Mickey Gannon
- Neighbours character
- Portrayed by: Fletcher O'Leary
- Duration: 2007–2009
- First appearance: 19 June 2007
- Last appearance: 14 July 2009
- Introduced by: Ric Pellizzeri
In-universe information
- Occupation: Student
- Father: Ned Parker
- Mother: Kirsten Gannon
- Grandfathers: Jim Parker
- Grandmothers: Kitty Parker
- Uncles: Steve Parker; Stuart Parker
- Aunts: Miranda Parker (in-law)
- First cousins: Bridget Parker; Riley Parker
- Other relatives: India Napier

Michael "Mickey" Gannon, played by Fletcher O'Leary, made his first on-screen appearance on 19 June 2007. Mickey is Ned Parker's son and he arrives in Ramsay Street when his mother decides she needs some time alone.

Fletcher O'Leary and his brother Blake both auditioned for the role of Mickey, with the elder brother winning the role. Blake was later cast in the role of Ben Fitzgerald. In May 2009, it was announced that O'Leary would be leaving Neighbours after two years, his final scenes were aired in Australia in July.

Mickey born as the result of a brief relationship between Ned Parker (Daniel O'Connor) and Kirsten Gannon (Nikola Dubois). Kirsten comes to Erinsborough to introduce Ned to his son. Ned panics when Kirsten leaves Mickey and his dog, Jake, with him. Ned struggles with Mickey and just as he is going to tell him that he is his father, Kirsten returns. Ned realises that he does not want to lose contact with Mickey, but Kirsten leaves again. Mickey is happy when Janae Timmins (Eliza Taylor-Cotter) gives him boxing lessons. Ned leaves Mickey with Frazer Yeats (Ben Lawson) for the day and Mickey gets an electric shock when he falls into the swimming pool. Frazer rescues him and at the hospital, Ned tells Mickey that he is his father. Mickey is devastated when Janae makes plans to leave town, but Janae decides to stay at the last minute. Mickey starts pretending to be ill to get out of going to school. Ned and Janae go to the school with Mickey and help him settle in.

Ned's brother, Steve Parker (Steve Bastoni) and his family arrive in town and Janae lets them use her garage to store their furniture. Mickey sneaks out of the house to play in the removal van and accidentally releases the handbrake. The van crashed into a minibus, which various Ramsay Street residents are travelling home in. Mickey leaves the scene of the accident unnoticed and runs away. He meets Declan Napier (James Sorensen) and they live on the streets for a few days. Declan tries to get Mickey to steal from a house and when Jake is injured, Declan takes Mickey to his home. Declan's mother, Rebecca (Jane Hall) calls a vet and Steve and his daughter, Bridget (Eloise Mignon), arrive and recognise Jake. They then take Mickey home. Kirsten comes back again and a custody battle begins. Kirsten takes Mickey and tries to leave town, but she is caught and decides to leave town alone to sort herself out.

Janae and Ned split up and she leaves, which upsets Mickey. However, he becomes closer to his father and mother. Kirsten is badly injured in a bushfire and she, Ned and Mickey leave for a Perth hospital. Mickey struggles to settle in Perth and he runs away to Ramsay Street. His friend, Callum Jones (Morgan Baker), helps hide him, but they are found. Lou Carpenter (Tom Oliver) takes Mickey back to Perth to see if he wants to stay there, but they return home. Mickey feels isolated when Bridget gives birth to a daughter. Steve arranges for Mickey to go back to Ned and Kirsten and Lou accompanies him on the trip.

For his role as Mickey, O'Leary was nominated for "Best Child Actor (Under 16)" at the 2008 Digital Spy Soap Awards. The same year also saw O'Leary nominated for "Best Young Actor" at the Inside Soap Awards. In 2009, O'Leary was again nominated for "Best Young Actor" at the Inside Soap Awards. Ruth Deller of television website Lowculture was negative towards the character and said Mickey was "only tolerable in scenes with Lou and Harold".

== Peggy Newton ==
Peggy Newton
- Neighbours character
- Portrayed by: Carolyn Bock
- Duration: 2007–2011
- First appearance: 24 July 2007
- Last appearance: 21 March 2011
- Introduced by: Ric Pellizzeri
In-universe information
- Occupation: Doctor
- Husband: Howard Newton

Peggy Newton, played by Carolyn Bock, made her first screen appearance on 24 July 2007. Peggy is a doctor at Erinsborough Hospital.

When a minibus carrying several Ramsay Street residents crashes in the street, Ringo Brown (Sam Clark) is seriously injured and has to be rushed to the hospital. Peggy treats him and revives him when he goes into cardiac arrest. She has to place him in a coma as she believes that he may not survive a second heart attack. A few days later, Ringo is brought out of the coma and Peggy is pleased at his progress. Ringo leaves the hospital to find Carmella Cammeniti (Natalie Blair). Peggy is not happy that he left, but she tells him that if he gets plenty of rest, he is allowed to go home. Carmella finds herself feeling faint and goes to see Peggy, who tells her that she has an iron deficiency and she is pregnant. Carmella has some tests and a scan, Peggy later tells her she need a second series of tests. Peggy helps Alan Napier (Barry Friedlander) who is in hospital with heart problems, when he takes a turn for the worse. Peggy later tells his daughter, Rebecca (Jane Hall) that he has died. Peggy decides that she wants to go ahead and begin divorce proceedings from her husband, Howard. She breaks down in her lawyer, Toadfish Rebecchi's (Ryan Moloney) office and he asks Rebecca to help. Rebecca makes Peggy realise that she is not ready to go ahead with the divorce. A few months later, Peggy interviews Karl Kennedy (Alan Fletcher) for a registrar job in the emergency department. Peggy does not give Karl the job as she has fears about his self-confidence. However, Peggy changes her mind when she sees Karl helping a patient.

When Nicola West (Imogen Bailey) suffers a needlestick injury, she tells Peggy that she is worried that she may be infected with something. Nicola then tells Peggy that she had illegally taken a blood sample, but realising that she will be suspended from work, she lies and says it was Karl instead. When Karl is suspended, Nicola tells Peggy the truth. Peggy later treats Nicola's brother-in-law Steve Parker (Steve Bastoni) when he goes into cardiac arrest. When Peggy fills in for obstetrician, Veronica Olenski (Caroline Lloyd), she examines Bridget Parker (Eloise Mignon) who is expecting her first child. A few weeks later, she examines Libby Kennedy (Kym Valentine) and reveals that she is pregnant. Libby is later rushed back in suffering from stomach pains, Peggy performs an ultrasound, which shows that the baby has a heartbeat. A few hours later, Libby loses the baby. Libby falls unconscious and Peggy has to ask Daniel Fitzgerald (Brett Tucker) for his consent to perform a hysterectomy. Paul Robinson (Stefan Dennis) tries to get Peggy to give an interview to his newspaper when Susan Kennedy (Jackie Woodburne) decides to become a surrogate for Libby. Paul reads a file in Peggy's office, but he is caught and she throws him out. When the surrogacy programme is cancelled, Peggy tells the Kennedys that she is not allowed to talk about it. However, she secretly meets Karl and tells him that the hospital board did not like the publicity surrounding the surrogacy. She then explains that she has been threatened with suspension if she speaks to anyone about the case.

Peggy treats Bridget again after she is injured in a car accident. Peggy tells her family that she is suffering from hypothermia and possible internal bleeding, she then treats her injuries. However, Bridget dies from an undetected blood clot, despite Peggy's efforts to save her. Peggy is later forced to tell Libby and Karl that Susan has suffered a miscarriage. Peggy treats Lucas Fitzgerald (Scott Major) when he is involved in a motorbike accident. She manages to get his seizures under control and confirms that he will make a full recovery after extensive rehabilitation. Peggy meets Natasha Williams' (Valentina Novakovic) for her twelve-week scan, but Natasha tells her that there has been a mistake and she is there about something else. After hearing Natasha's symptoms, Peggy suggests that she is stressed. Summer Hoyland (Jordy Lucas) later asks Peggy if there is a way to tell where an ultrasound picture came from. Peggy tells her that there is usually a watermark on the photo and when Summer shows her some scan pictures, Peggy tells her they are fake.

== Justin Hunter ==
Justin Hunter
- Neighbours character
- Portrayed by: Chris Toohey
- Duration: 2007–2009
- First appearance: 7 August 2007
- Last appearance: 7 July 2009
- Introduced by: Ric Pellizzeri
In-universe information
- Occupation: Student at Erinsborough High; Gym assistant
- Brothers: Dale Hunter; Wayne Hunter

Justin Hunter, played by Chris Toohey, made his first on-screen appearance on 7 August 2007. Justin attended Erinsborough High, where he bullied several students. He became friends with Kyle Canning and Zeke Kinski.

Chris Toohey previously appeared in Neighbours in 2005 as Jake Rinter. Toohey later auditioned for the part of Erinsborough High student, Justin Hunter and he was cast in the role. He said he was unaware of how long he would last on the show and was surprised that it had been two years. Toohey said that his most enjoyable storylines to shoot were the car racing and the Dingoes football team scenes.

Justin is unhappy when Bridget Parker (Eloise Mignon) is invited to train with the Eastside Dingoes football team. Justin tries to make her look weak and warns Zeke Kinski (Matthew Werkmeister) not to invite her back. When Justin finds out that the coach has asked her back, he tells Zeke to inform Bridget that she is not welcome. The coach invites Bridget to join the team for a practice game and Justin takes the opportunity to push her around. At school, Justin suggests that she would be better off playing netball and he pushes her. When Bridget is out with Declan Napier (James Sorensen) in his car they come across Justin and his two brothers Dale (Leon Stripp) and Wayne Hunter (Karl Van Moorsel). Justin and Declan challenge each other to a race. Bridget throws a drink through Justin's window, ruining the interior of his car. Declan races off, but the Hunter brothers catch up with them. Declan and Bridget make a run for it, they later find the car has been vandalised. Justin turns up in Ramsay Street and asks Declan for another drag race. The police turn up during that race and go after the Hunter brothers.

Justin attends swimming trials and he mocks Ringo Brown's (Sam Clark) fear of water. Justin is told off by Daniel Fitzgerald (Brett Tucker), but when Ringo almost passes out and has to be rescued, Justin laughs at him in the changing rooms. Justin then bullies Zeke and a fight breaks out. Justin also teases Zeke's sister, Rachel (Caitlin Stasey) about her affair with their English teacher. Rachel throws a book at him and a fight breaks out, with Declan also getting into it. Another fight breaks out the following week and Rachel asks Justin why he hates her. He tells her that she does nothing but moan when she has a good life, with parents who care about her. Daniel then tells Justin that his parents were not coming to collect him, and he would have to spend the rest of the day outside the principal's office. Justin starts mocking Rachel again and she begins to receive strange text messages. Rachel realises that Justin sent the messages and she confronts him, she lies that the police would be able to trace the messages and he confesses.

Justin gets a job at the Gym and he offers Zeke money to write his essays. Justin starts bullying Bridget again, after he finds out she is pregnant. Justin becomes a bad influence on Zeke, who begins hanging out with him, Kyle Canning (Chris Milligan) and Shane Gregory (Ryan Bate). The boys go to a factory instead of going to school and Justin falls down a gap in the flooring. Zeke helps him up, earning his respect. The following week, the students go on a rafting trip and a raft race is organised. Zeke, Kyle, Justin and Bridget's raft is capsized after they try to cheat. Justin and Kyle make it to the riverbank, but Libby Kennedy (Kym Valentine), Zeke and Bridget are missing. Libby and Bridget are later found, but Zeke remains missing for several weeks. Months later, Justin taunts Bridget and Declan about their baby.

== Richard Aaronow ==
Richard Aaronow
- Neighbours character
- Portrayed by: Blair Venn
- Duration: 2007–2008
- First appearance: 9 August 2007
- Last appearance: 3 February 2008
- Introduced by: Ric Pellizzeri
In-universe information
- Occupation: Principal at Alkrington Grammar School
- Sons: Oliver Barnes; Declan Napier
- Granddaughters: Chloe Cammeniti; India Napier

Richard Aaronow, played by Blair Venn, made his first on-screen appearance on 9 August 2007. He is Oliver Barnes and Declan Napier's father.

Richard had a relationship with Rebecca Napier (Jane Hall), which resulted in Rebecca falling pregnant. Rebecca gave the baby up for adoption and later went back to Richard. Things ended badly when Richard raped her. Rebecca fell pregnant again and she ran away from him. When Oliver Barnes (David Hoflin) wants to know more about his father, Elle Robinson (Pippa Black) finds Richard's name on Declan Napier's (James Sorensen) birth certificate and looks him up. She goes to Alkrington Grammar School and discovers that Richard is the Principal. Richard meets with Elle, who lies about why she is there. Richard later finds her purse and goes to Erinsborough, where he sees Rebecca. Richard rings Rebecca and tells her that she cannot run from him again. Oliver meets Richard, who reveals that he did not know Oliver existed until much later. Rebecca's father dies and Declan contacts Richard asking if he could get to know him, as he had missed out on knowing his grandfather. They go on a fishing trip and Declan tries to hit Richard. Richard falls into the river and disappears. Richard makes it back to land and he begins to threaten Declan, when Rebecca, Oliver and Paul Robinson (Stefan Dennis) arrive. Rebecca tells the police about Richard raping her and she launches a civil case against him.

Richard follows Rebecca, Declan and Paul out to the countryside and he confronts Rebecca. Rebecca tells him to stay away, but Richard refuses and tries to grab her. Rebecca pushes him away and hits his head. He is taken to the hospital and the group are told that Richard is seriously ill with renal failure. Declan offers to donate his kidney to Richard, so Richard would confess to raping Rebecca. However, Rebecca refuses to give her permission and Oliver offers his kidney instead. After the operation, Richard takes a turn for the worse. He is re-admitted to the hospital and Karl Kennedy (Alan Fletcher) treats him. Karl discovers that Oliver donated his kidney to Richard and he tries to convince Richard to let him contact Oliver and Declan. Paul follows Karl to Richard's room and Karl tells him that he has a few hours left. Oliver, Declan and Rebecca visit him and Richard apologizes to Rebecca. Oliver and Declan then wait until they hear that Richard has died.

== Brad Jordan ==
Brad Jordan
- Neighbours character
- Portrayed by: Brendan O'Connor
- Duration: 2007–2008
- First appearance: 17 September 2007
- Last appearance: 26 July 2008
- Introduced by: Ric Pellizzeri
In-universe information
- Occupation: Erinsborough News Editor
- Daughters: Taylah Jordan
- Other relatives: Ty Harper

Brad Jordan, played by Brendan O'Connor, is the father of Taylah Jordan and he was the Editor of the Erinsborough News. He made his first on-screen appearance on 17 September 2007.

When Elle Robinson's (Pippa Black) father, Paul Robinson (Stefan Dennis), believes that he killed Gus Cleary (Ben Barrack), Elle agrees to find Gus' family. She goes to the Erinsborough News office to speak to Riley Parker (Sweeney Young). He refuses to help, so Elle goes to Brad and steals his Filofax. Brad sees the opportunity for a story when a contact tells him that someone confessed to Gus' murder. Elle threatens Brad with legal action, but he points out that he did not mention any names. Elle writes a new article about the number of false confessions to major crimes and Brad prints it. He tells Elle that she would make a good journalist. Elle writes a story about some neglected horses on farm, but when the article goes to print, Elle learn that the farmer was suffering from the effects of a recent drought. Elle goes to Brad and suggests that she write a series of articles on people who have been affected by the drought. Brad rejects the idea and tells her that the news had moved on. Elle takes the story to rival paper, The West Waratah Star, who print it. Brad then offers Elle a cadetship, which she initially turns down, before accepting.

Elle angers Brad when she takes his parking space. When he turns up late, he demands to know who took the space he had spent ten years working towards. He tells Elle that she is skating on thin ice. Brad gives a big story to another reporter and Elle asks Riley to join her in researching illegal raves that had been taking place in the area. Elle and Riley attended one of the raves at a warehouse and the building collapses. Brad's daughter, Taylah (Danielle Horvat), is among the injured. At the hospital, Brad warns Elle and Riley that if they do not follow his orders, he might as well sack them. He tells them that they are on their final warning. When Elle starts writing a story about Rachel Kinski's (Caitlin Stasey) relationship with her teacher, her stepsister, Libby Kennedy (Kym Valentine) goes to Brad and asks him to drop the story. Brad refuses and tells Elle to continue with the story and not to get involved with Riley. Brad is unaware that Taylah is hiding Rachel in her bedroom. Taylah tells Rachel that her mother had walked out on her and Brad when she was young and Brad had become a workaholic. Brad tries to mend his ways and he comes to Taylah's room to tell her how much he cared about her. Taylah contacts Rachel's brother, Zeke (Matthew Werkmeister), and he and Rachel's other friends come to the house. An argument breaks out, which Brad overhears and he calls Rachel's parents to come and get her.

Brad receives a visit from Elle's father because he wants her to quit her job. Paul threatens Brad into sacking her and Brad gives in. He cannot sack Elle, so he tells her that she is going on sick leave. Brad prints a story about the council knowing that the warehouse was unsafe. Brad hears that Taylah and Zeke have been caught drinking and trying to sleep together and he drags Taylah home. He warns Karl Kennedy (Alan Fletcher) to keep Zeke away from his daughter. When Zeke goes to Taylah's room, he ends up falling asleep on the bed with her and Brad and the Kennedys find them. Brad announces that Taylah is going to a girls' boarding school. Brad calms down, but when he discovers that Taylah had gone on the pill, he tells everyone that she is going to boarding school in Sydney next week. A few weeks later, Brad is giving Elle a lot of work to do and Paul jumps to her defence. Brad does not listen and is shocked when he discovers that Paul is the new owner of the paper, and he is unemployed.

== Marco Silvani ==
Marco Silvani, played by Jesse Rosenfeld, made his first on-screen appearance on 19 October 2007. Marco began a relationship with a pregnant Carmella Cammeniti, which caused tensions between himself and the baby's father, Oliver Barnes. The character was introduced to "spice up Carmella's love life". Network Ten describe Marco as "handsome, charming, witty and intelligent".

== Josh Taylor ==
Josh Taylor
- Neighbours character
- Portrayed by: Liam Hemsworth
- Duration: 2007–2008
- First appearance: 29 October 2007
- Last appearance: 26 August 2008
- Introduced by: Ric Pellizzeri

Josh Taylor is played by Liam Hemsworth who made his first appearance on 29 October 2007. The character and Hemsworth's casting details were announced on 13 July 2007. Hemsworth started filming his guest role in the same week. Josh was introduced as a love interest for Bridget Parker (Eloise Mignon). Josh uses a wheelchair and Hemsworth said he has "obviously been through a lot", but he is ready to help Bridget through her own difficult time. When Jackie Brygel from TV Week pointed out that Josh seems to have really fallen for Bridget, Hemsworth replied "Yes, it's love at first sight for him." However, he added that Bridget's former boyfriend was still "in the picture" as far as she is concerned.

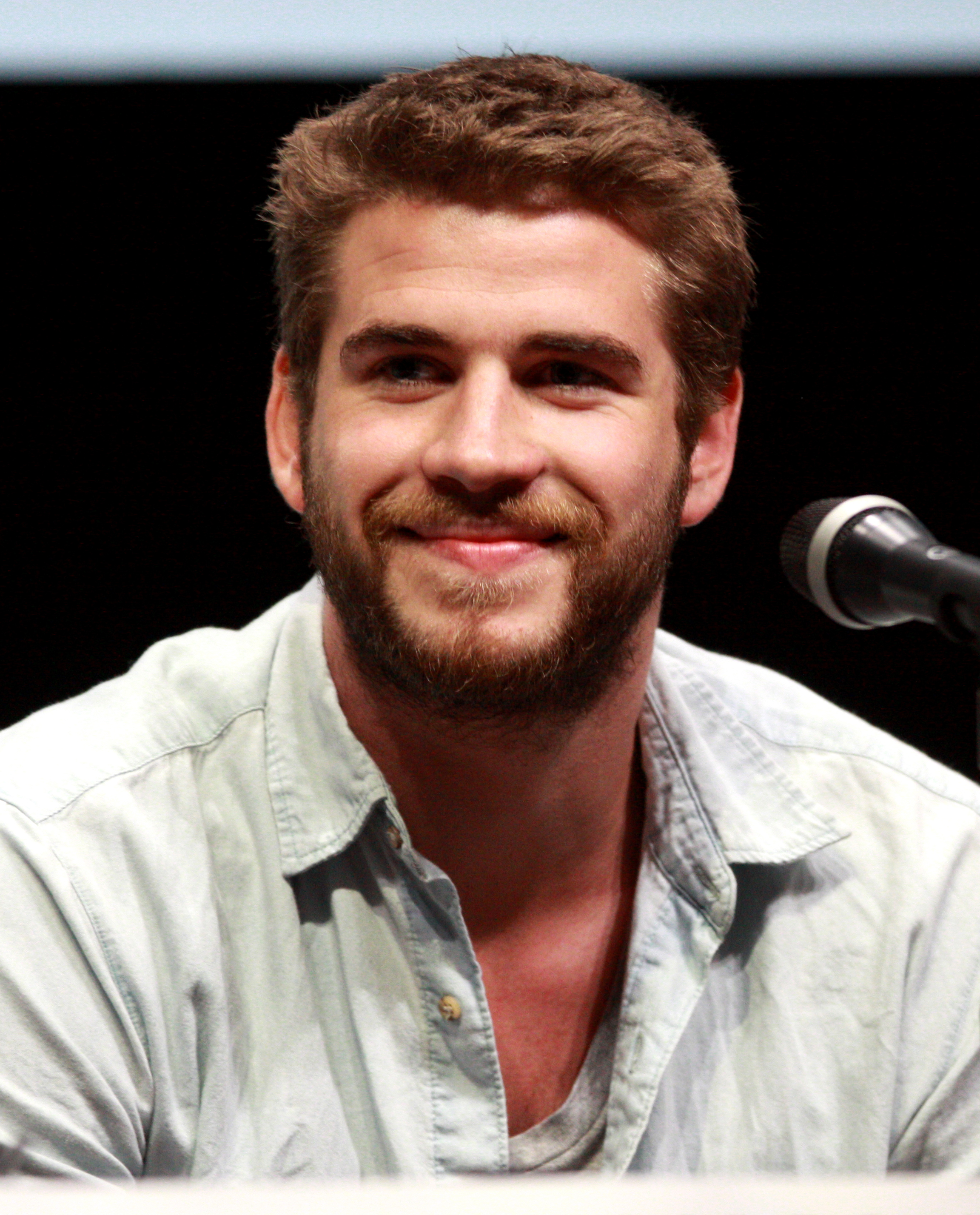
Liam Hemsworth portrayed Josh Taylor from 2007 to 2008.

Josh became a paraplegic after a surfing accident. His family moved to Melbourne from Brisbane and Josh began attending physiotherapy sessions at the Erinsborough pool. During one session, he meets Bridget Parker, who is feeling sad because she is making slow progress with her recovery. Josh flirts with her and makes her feel better. He also tells her that he would do anything to walk again and that she should stick with her therapy. The pair grow closer and begin seeing each other. Josh becomes worried about Bridget when she stops attending her sessions and she tells him that she has given up. Josh is disgusted by her attitude and Bridget later decides to return. She also agrees to go on a date with him, where they share their first kiss. Bridget introduces Josh to her family and she asks him to go to an illegal rave with her. The roof of the warehouse collapses and many people are left trapped, including Josh and Bridget. Declan Napier (James Sorensen) pushes Josh to safety and Josh makes his way outside. Bridget becomes confused about her feelings after almost kissing Declan whilst they are trapped. Josh comes over to her house for dinner and Bridget realises that he is a great guy. Josh runs into Declan at the General Store and he tells him to back off from Bridget. Josh starts to realise that Bridget is not interested in spending time with him and when she backs out of meeting up, Josh confronts her. He tells her to sort things out with Declan as she clearly wants to be with him.

A few months later, Bridget is invited to give a talk at the hospital and she meets Josh again. They go for a drink at the General Store. Bridget meets up with Josh again and he thinks that she is still interested in him. Declan sees Josh touching Bridget and demands to know what is going on. Josh agrees to go on a date with Bridget's friend, Donna Freedman (Margot Robbie), to get an invite to Declan's birthday party. Josh gets in a bidding war over Bridget at a charity slave auction and Donna realises that she is being used. She then bids and wins Bridget, leaving Josh on his own. A few days later, Josh runs into Donna at the General Store and she warns him off Bridget. She accidentally lets slip that Bridget and Declan had not slept together yet and Josh winds Declan up. Declan lies and says he has slept with Bridget and Josh tells her. Josh challenges Declan to a game of wheelchair basketball with the winner getting Bridget. Josh calls him a chicken and Declan takes up the challenge. Bridget sees the whole thing and storms off. She later asks Josh why he was being so nasty and he explains that he is tired of losing out. He tells her that Declan got the girl while he was just a nice guy in a wheelchair. Bridget then tells him that it had nothing to do with the wheelchair and that she just likes Declan more.

== Taylah Jordan ==
Taylah Jordan
- Neighbours character
- Portrayed by: Danielle Horvat
- Duration: 2007–2008
- First appearance: 30 October 2007
- Last appearance: 20 May 2008
- Introduced by: Ric Pellizzeri
In-universe information
- Occupation: Student
- Father: Brad Jordan
- First cousins: Ty Harper

Taylah Jordan, played by Danielle Horvat, made her first on-screen appearance on 30 October 2007. Taylah is Brad Jordan's daughter and a romantic interest for Zeke Kinski.

The ongoing role of Taylah was Horvat's first acting job. Her agent called her with an audition for the character of Taylah, which was supposed to be a six-week guest role. Horvat auditioned in front of Neighbours casting director Jan Russ. A week later she received a call telling her that she had been successful. Horvat described Taylah as a "typical youthful school girl, who enjoys the company of her friends and loves to have fun". She believed that young girls could relate to her character.

When Taylah and her best friend, Jessica Wallace (Heidi Valkenburg), are at the local swimming pool, they see Bridget Parker (Eloise Mignon) undergoing physiotherapy for her paralysis. They notice Josh Taylor (Liam Hemsworth) and start talking about how good looking he was and how it was a shame he was in a wheelchair. Josh comes over to them and tells Taylah and Jessica how brave they are living their lives, despite their condition. This leaves Taylah and Jessica confused and they leave. Taylah helps Jessica out when she develops a crush on Ringo Brown (Sam Clark), whose girlfriend Rachel Kinski (Caitlin Stasey) is away. Jessica makes friends with him and she meets him at the General Store, where she kisses him and Taylah takes a photo. Jessica is not happy to see Ringo and Rachel together and sends the photo to Rachel. Taylah is happy to lie for Jessica when Ringo confronts them. Taylah runs into Zeke Kinski (Matthew Werkmeister) at a party and after spending the night outside chatting and looking at the stars, Zeke and Taylah kiss. She tells him that their new relationship would be their secret. However, the teens attend an illegal rave and they decide to go public. The roof of the warehouse collapses and Zeke and Taylah are separated. After Taylah is rescued, she tells Zeke's family that she does not know what happened to him. Jessica dies in the accident and Taylah gets together with Ringo, Rachel, Zeke and others to say goodbye to her at a memorial service.

Just before she had died, Jessica had told Taylah that their new teacher, Angus Henderson (Jonathan Wood), was seeing a student. Taylah thinks it is Bridget and when she passes her a note in class, it is taken by Daniel Fitzgerald (Brett Tucker). Taylah is upset over the trouble she causes Bridget, not knowing that Rachel was the one involved with Angus. When she runs away, Taylah asks her to come to her house. Taylah tells Rachel about her mother leaving the family and how her father buries himself in work. Taylah contacts Zeke and he, Bridget, Ringo and Declan arrive at the house. Rachel is furious with Taylah, until Zeke points out the situation is Rachel's fault. Taylah invites everyone to see her cousin Ty Harper's (Dean Geyer) band. Taylah is determined to set Rachel up with Ty and she gives Ty Rachel's phone number, but he tells her that he does not want to date one of Taylah's friends.

Zeke discovers that Taylah used to date Chris Knight (Luke Mitchell). Taylah tells him that she loves him because he is different from other guys. They decide to take things to the next level, but they are interrupted by Susan Kennedy (Jackie Woodburne). Brad bans Taylah and Zeke from seeing each other, but Zeke later sneaks into her room. Brad, Susan and Karl Kennedy (Alan Fletcher) find them and they are split up. Taylah later visits Karl and explains that she wants to go on the pill. Zeke takes Taylah to a beach, where he hopes they will sleep together. Taylah tells him that Chris had taken her to the same beach and forced her to have sex with him. Brad finds Taylah's prescription for the pill and he announces that she is going to a boarding school in Sydney. Taylah attends the school formal with Zeke and they share one last kiss after he walks her home. When Chris dies after trying to force Bridget to have sex with him, Taylah gives evidence that Chris had done the same thing to her and Bridget is let off the charges.

== Jessica Wallace ==
Jessica Wallace
- Neighbours character
- Portrayed by: Heidi Valkenburg
- Duration: 2007–2008
- First appearance: 30 October 2007
- Last appearance: 14 January 2008
- Introduced by: Ric Pellizzeri
In-universe information
- Occupation: Student
- Mother: Evelyn Wallace

Jessica Wallace, played by Heidi Valkenburg, made her first on-screen appearance on 30 October 2007. The character was called a "manipulative schoolgirl" by The West Australian newspaper and a "mean girl" by TV Tonight.

Valkenburg auditioned for Neighbours during a break from performing in a play. She initially auditioned for the role of Taylah Jordan, but her agent told her that Neighbours wanted her for the role of Jessica. Valkenburg described Jessica as a "complex little being". She added that the character was "awesome" and she wished she had stuck around longer.

When Jessica and her best friend, Taylah Jordan (Danielle Horvat), are at the local swimming pool, they see Bridget Parker (Eloise Mignon) undergoing physiotherapy for her paralysis. They notice Josh Taylor (Liam Hemsworth) and start talking about how good looking he was and how it was a shame he was in a wheelchair. Josh comes over to them and tells Jessica and Taylah how brave they are living their lives, despite their condition. This leaves Jessica and Taylah confused and they leave. Jessica turns her attentions to Ringo Brown (Sam Clark) after his girlfriend Rachel Kinski (Caitlin Stasey) goes away. Jessica catches Ringo photocopying a cartoon of their principal, Helen Carr (Margot Fenley), and she tries to talk him into making copies for everyone. Jessica then finds the original and makes copies of it and puts them all over the corridor. Helen asks the entire year who drew the cartoon and Daniel Fitzgerald (Brett Tucker) admits to drawing it. However, Ringo lies that he drew the cartoon and when he is placed in detention, Jessica owns up too. While they are in detention, Ringo and Jessica get on well. Though Ringo reminds her that he was going out with Rachel.

Jessica calls Ringo and ask him to meet her at the General Store. She tells him that she had had a bad date and she wanted someone to talk to. As they go to leave, Jessica kisses Ringo and Taylah takes a picture of the kiss. Jessica is happy to hear that Ringo and Rachel had split up, but is angry when get back together. Jessica sends the picture of her kiss with Ringo to Rachel and when Ringo confronts Jessica, Taylah lies that she sent it. Jessica and Rachel have a fight at the swimming pool and Jessica jumps into the pool, in order to accuse Rachel of pushing her. Ringo is not sure whom to believe, which contributes to Rachel later ending their relationship. At an illegal rave party being held in a warehouse, Jessica tries to get close to Ringo. While she is outside, Jessica sees Rachel getting out of their teacher, Angus Henderson's (Jonathan Wood), car. Jessica realises that she has witnessed a big scandal and she starts dropping hints that she has something huge to tell everyone. She tells Taylah that Angus is having an affair with a student, but refuses to say who with. Jessica and Ringo then get together, which makes her happy. The roof collapses and Jessica and Ringo are trapped. They hold hands and talk and Jessica asks Ringo to tell her mother that she loves her and she's sorry for being a disappointment. Jessica then dies from her injuries.

== Angus Henderson ==
Angus Henderson
- Neighbours character
- Portrayed by: Jonathan Wood
- Duration: 2007–2008
- First appearance: 19 November 2007
- Last appearance: 15 August 2008
- Introduced by: Ric Pellizzeri
In-universe information
- Occupation: Teacher

Angus Henderson, played by Jonathan Wood, made his first screen appearance on 19 November 2007. His relationship with Rachel proved controversial with other characters. (Caitlin Stasey) spoke to TV Week, describing their dynamic within their relationship: "She's so taken with him. I don't know if she's really in love with him – it's more that she's totally besotted by him. But she hasn't been thinking straight. At the same time, Angus would have known that he shouldn't have got involved with rachel. He's the adult in the relationship, not Rachel. [...] And Rachel's heart will get broken, too."

The character proved to be popular with viewers and following his departure, a campaign on the social networking site, Facebook, was set up calling for his return. Ruth Deller of television website Lowculture called Angus Rachel's "inappropriate-but-cute-teacher-shag". She later deemed the relationship between Rachel and Angus as "scandalous". A reporter for the Daily Record stated "We always knew that, like a bad penny, Angus Henderson would return to Rachel's life." Another reporter for the same paper later wrote "He may be one of the most handsome men ever to set foot in Erinsborough but it's clear his good looks aren't impressing those who feel that, as a teacher, he should never have got involved with Rachel."

Rachel Kinski bumps into Angus at the local pool and again at Charlie's bar. Angus gives her his number and tells her to call him. Rachel runs in him again and they arrange a date to go see a band. Rachel tells Angus that she is at university and they share a kiss at the end of the night. The next day, Rachel is shocked to find Angus standing at the front of her classroom, as her new teacher. Angus lashes out at Rachel and he points out that she lied to him. Angus struggles with his feelings when he sees Rachel in his class. Angus offers Rachel a lift home and Jessica Wallace (Heidi Valkenburg) sees them together. That same night, a group of Erinsborough High teens go to a rave and Rachel realises that Jessica knows about her and Angus. Rachel goes to his apartment and Angus apologises for allowing their relationship to go too far. Angus tells her to leave, but Rachel returns and kisses him. Angus tells her that as he is not returning to Erinsborough High for the new school year, their only problem was her age. Angus thinks about ending things, but Rachel convinces him that they should be together.

Angus accepts a permanent position at Erinsborough High and when Rachel hears, she leaves a party to go to his apartment. Bridget Parker (Eloise Mignon) realises that Daniel Fitzgerald is also heading to the apartment and she goes there to warn Rachel and Angus. Daniel catches her with Angus and Bridget covers for Rachel by pretending that she has a crush on Angus. Declan guesses the truth about Rachel and Angus and blurts it out at school. Daniel questions Rachel about the allegations, but she and Angus deny everything. Daniel then lies to Rachel that Angus had called her immature. Rachel runs into the corridor and confronts Angus, who tells her that she had been tricked. Angus is questioned by the police and later released, pending trial. Susan Kennedy (Jackie Woodburne) visits him and begs him to end things with Rachel, which he does before going to live with his parents. Angus returns a few months later and he runs into Rachel and admits that he missed her. At the trial, Rachel says that she had entered the relationship willingly. Angus is given a six-month prison sentence and as he is taken away, he manages to give Rachel a ring and a note.

Rachel is sad when her letters to Angus are returned, but shortly after a letter from Angus arrives. Angus tells her that he had been scared, but he wants her to visit him. Rachel and Susan go to the prison and Angus tells her that he loves her, but Rachel runs out of the room. She returns the next day and Angus tells her that he is being released early. Rachel finds Angus a flat and invites him to dinner. Angus' flat is graffitied by Ringo Brown (Sam Clark) and a brick is thrown through the window. Rachel moves in, but when her brother tells her that everyone is fighting, Angus sends Rachel home. Angus tries to leave town, but a message from Rachel makes him return. Angus asks her to move in with him properly and Rachel agrees. Newspaper editor, Paul Robinson (Stefan Dennis) offers to pay Angus for his story, but Rachel is interviewed instead. Paul changes Rachel's words and Rachel is horrified. Daniel accuses Angus of writing one of Rachel's essays and Angus realises that he will never be able to live a normal life in Erinsborough. Angus finds a job in Adelaide and he and Rachel make plans to leave. Rachel has second thoughts when they are driving out of town and she asks him to return her to Ramsay Street. She gives Angus one final kiss and he drives away.

== Mia Silvani ==
Mia Silvani
- Neighbours character
- Portrayed by: Petra Yared
- Duration: 2007–2008
- First appearance: 30 November 2007
- Last appearance: 18 March 2008
- Introduced by: Ric Pellizzeri
In-universe information
- Occupation: Fruit and Veg retailer
- Father: Franco Silvani
- Mother: Patrizia Silvani
- Brothers: Marco Silvani
- Uncles: Gino Silvani

Mia Silvani, played by Petra Yared, is Marco Silvani's sister. She made her first on-screen appearance on 30 November 2007. Yared previously played the role of George Brown in 1996 before returning as Mia. She said that returning to Neighbours was "so much fun" and she added that things had not changed much at all.

When Mia meets Oliver Barnes (David Hoflin), they are attracted to each other and after weeks of flirting, they share a kiss. Hoflin said that Oliver finds Mia attractive and the thought of annoying Marco, by starting a relationship with her, makes it "even more tantalising." Mia's brother walks in on them and he is not happy with the situation. He believes that Oliver is just using Mia to get back at him. Oliver and Mia then decide to continue their relationship in secret.

Mia's brother, Marco Silvani (Jesse Rosenfeld), and his business partner Carmella Cammeniti (Natalie Blair) hold a cocktail party at his apartment and Mia is one of the guests. She is happy to meet Carmella, but she makes it clear that Carmella needs to back off from Marco. The next morning, Mia is shocked to see Carmella walk into the kitchen, dressed only in Marco's shirt. Mia warns her that Marco is not ready to move on from his ex-wife, Marisa, who was also Mia's best friend. Mia tells Marco that she was warning Carmella not to take advantage of him, but Marco tells Mia not to worry. He later tells her that he would not be getting back with Marisa. A few weeks later, Carmella gives birth to a daughter, Chloe (Sarah May) and ends her relationship with Marco. Mia helps Carmella run her business as well as taking care of the fruit and veg deliveries for the Silvani business. Mia calls by Carmella's apartment to collect the accounts and she meets Chloe's father, Oliver Barnes. Mia admits that she is surprised to meet him and they flirt with each other. Mia tells Oliver about Marco's marriage to Marisa and her belief that they are still in love with each other.

Mia continues to talk to Marco about his break up with Marisa and he finally admits that he is infertile, which is why he left his wife who wanted a family. Mia backs off and tells Oliver that Marco and Carmella are good together. Oliver finds Marisa's number on Mia's phone, but he is caught and Mia almost walks out as she believes that Oliver is using her to get to Marco. Oliver talks her round and they end up having sex in a hotel room, but they decide to keep their relationship a secret. Mia takes an invoice to the hotel and she runs into Oliver. He flirts with a guest in front of her and she accuses him of being shallow. She later apologises to him at Carmella's apartment and they are kissing when Carmella and Marco walk in. Marco tells her that she should stop seeing Oliver as he believes that he is using her. Mia leaves, but she later asks Oliver if he was using her. Oliver admits that it had been his intention, but he had developed feelings for her. Mia meets with Marco, who apologises to her, but points out that they were now even. Mia and Oliver's relationship continues and they arrive at Chloe's Christening together. Oliver works out that Marco is infertile and attacks him. Mia is disgusted by Oliver and storms off, but Oliver follows her. Mia refuses to listen to him and later ends their relationship. She then apologises to Marco and Carmella, before leaving town for a while.

== Others ==
Date(s)	Character	Actor	Circumstances
6 February–14 March	Raimondo Cammeniti	Jeff Kovski	Raimondo is Rocco Cammeniti's brother and Teresa's father. Raimondo takes over the family's fruit and veg business when Rocco is sent to jail. When Rocco learns that Carmella Cammeniti sold Teresa's baby he runs the fruit business into the ground. Carmella meets with Ray and tells him that she will save the business. They get into a war as Carmella undercuts Ray's own fruit and veg business.
23 February–16 April	Abby Stafford	Louise Crawford	Abby works as a secretary at the Tim Collins and Associates law office and she begins dating Toadfish Rebecchi. Abby has a young daughter, Zoe Stafford and she and Toadie get on well. Abby overhears Toadie tell Rosetta Cammeniti that he is not over Stephanie Scully and Abby tells him that she is quitting her job and they break up.
1–9 March	Zoe Stafford	Emily Farrell	Zoe is Abby Stafford's daughter.
19–29 March	Pete Gartside	Daniel Schutzmann	Pete is a British professional Footballer who has an affair with a pregnant Izzy Hoyland. Pete tries to pay Izzy off, but she asks Susan Kennedy to help her and Susan tells Pete to follow his heart. Pete tells Izzy to let Karl Kennedy know that he is the father of her baby. Izzy goes into labour and Pete is there to see her give birth to a daughter. He and Izzy agree not to tell Karl the truth, so his happiness is not ruined.
16 April–25 May	Kevin Casey	Zen Ledden	Kevin is Mary Casey's son. He had a relationship with Pepper Steiger when he was in high school and it resulted in Pepper becoming pregnant. She later lost the baby. Kevin is questioned by the police when Pepper starts being stalked. His mother later locks him in a room with Pepper, but they escape when they set it on fire.
7 May–27 November	Demi Vinton	Angela Twigg	Demi Vinton is a GP and Neurologist at Erinsborough Hospital. She informs Paul Robinson that he has an advanced brain tumour and would need surgery. Paul puts off treatment and Demi tells him that he is at greater risk of dying. Paul's daughter, Elle, later takes him back to the hospital for surgery. A few months later, Richard Aaronow for a head injury and she tells his family that he is in end-stage renal failure. When Bridget Parker is hit by a car, Demi rushes Bridget in for an emergency operation to relieve bleeding on her brain. Bridget suffers an epileptic fit, but Demi explains that it is quite normal after head traumas. Shortly after, Demi treats Rachel Kinski after she is hit by a brick thrown through the Kennedys' window. Demi later breaks the news that Bridget is paralysed down her left side and a few weeks later she tells Susan Kennedy that she has MS.
9–29 May	Fox	Tim Phillipps	Fox is a teenage boy who meets Paul Robinson, and eventually turns out to be a figment of his imagination due to his undiagnosed brain tumour. Phillips later appeared as Paul's nephew, Daniel Robinson.
14 May, 16 July – 10 December 2008	Mike Watt	Patrick Flynn	A police officer who arrests Sky Mangel on suspicion of the murder of Terence Chesterton. Mike is later involved in the search of arsonist Jay Duncan and the arrest of Nicola West. Several months later, Mike and a colleague are called to Erinsborough High by principal Andrew Simpson who suspects a terrorist attack after seeing four figures in balaclavas. However, the culprits are revealed to be Zeke Kinski, Justin Hunter, Kyle Canning and Shane Gregory, who are playing a prank. The following week, Mike arrests Susan Kennedy when she inadvertently breaches a restraining order that Samantha Fitzgerald has taken out on her.
14–31 May	Krystal McCoy	Freya Nielson	Krystal is a prisoner at Goodwood Women's Prison who begins a hate campaign against Sky Mangel when she is remanded in custody on suspicion of killing con artist Terence Chesterton. Krystal pretends to be nice at first but shows her true colours by stealing a hat belonging to Sky's infant daughter Kerry. Sky stands up to Krystal and reports her, resulting in Krystal being transferred to Solitary Confinement. Krystal swears revenge and begins threatening Kerry and tears up a picture Sky has. Mary Casey, Sky's new cellmate pays Krystal a visit in her cell and is seemingly reasonable but attacks her and breaks her arm in the process and retrieves the hat which she gives to Sky. Krystal, incensed, then plans a riot in order to kidnap Kerry but is overheard by Mary, who takes Kerry to safety and hides her away in a stairwell.
8 June–12 July	Michaela Chapel	Selma Danculovic	Michalea is Janae Timmins opponent for an upcoming boxing match. She arrives at Carpenter's Mechanics to intimidate Janae into taking a dive early into the fight, which only serves to provoke Janae's ire, causing her to fly at Michaela but is stopped by Ned Parker. Michaela leaves but then makes a phonecall to Ned, telling him to talk Janae into pulling out of the fight. This fails however and the following month, the fight goes ahead the community centre. Michaela scores the knockdown early in the first round but only manages to put Janae down for the count of seven. Janae rallies and fights back but ultimately Michaela wins on points. Michaela, now respecting Janae, challenges her to a rematch in Brisbane which she accepts.
11 June–27 July	Caleb Maloney	Nick Russell	While Janelle Timmins volunteers at the hospital, she meets Caleb, who tells her he was the recipient of her son Stingray Timmins' heart. Boyd Hoyland, Sky Mangel and Stingray's sister Bree Timmins visit and Caleb explains that he was in a car crash. Caleb and Sky bond over their love of art and they begin spending time together, as they create a memorial to Stingray. Caleb admits that he was drink driving the night of the crash, which killed his best friend. He tells Sky that his friends and family have disowned him. Caleb and Sky kiss, but she wants to take things slow. Caleb asks her grandfather's permission to date her, and they go to Sydney for an art exhibition. On their return, Caleb has chest pains and is admitted to hospital because the anti-rejection medication has stopped working. He asks Boyd not to tell Sky that he has to leave for California for experimental treatment. Caleb breaks up with Sky over the phone, but Boyd tells her the truth and she comes to the hospital, where Caleb tells her that he if he gets through the treatment, he will return home to her.
3 July	Angelica Cammeniti	Jennifer Jarman	Rosetta Cammeniti's mother invites her two aunts, Angelica and Sofia, to Rosie's home, so they could plan her wedding to Frazer Yeats. They arrive with bridal magazines and food. Frazer later tells the woman that it is Rosie's wedding and the decisions should be hers, when they try to take over.
3 July	Sofia Cammeniti	Ruth Yaffe	Rosetta Cammeniti's mother invites her two aunts, Angelica and Sofia, to Rosie's home, so they could plan her wedding to Frazer Yeats. They arrive with bridal magazines and food. Frazer later tells the woman that it is Rosie's wedding and the decisions should be hers, when they try to take over.
5–6 July	Greg Baxter	Christopher Connelly	Greg is the biological father of Bree Timmins and the adoptive father of Anne Baxter. Greg comes to collect Anne and ends up meeting Bree and they talk. He tells her that she is the spitting image of his mother and that he wants to get to know her.
9 July	Marcus Napier	James Lawson	Marcus is Rebecca Napier's brother. Oliver Barnes goes to Marcus' house to ask who is real parents are. Marcus tells him that he spent a few months away and, on his return, Rebecca had gone and Pamela and Clifford Barnes suddenly had a baby boy.
16 July	Pamela Barnes	Brooke Nicol	Pamela and Clifford are Oliver Barnes' late adoptive parents who are seen in an old home movie.
16 July	Clifford Barnes	Andrew Wemyss	Pamela and Clifford are Oliver Barnes' late adoptive parents who are seen in an old home movie.
18–19 July	Ian Phillips	Christopher Brown	Ian is hired to care for Tom Kennedy, who is suffering from dementia. Ian mistreats Tom by ignoring him and stealing his lunch. He later tells Susan Kennedy that Tom has taken from his wallet, and she replaces it. Zeke Kinski sets up a camera to catch Ian out, and Ian takes Susan's wedding rings from the windowsill. Tom confronts Ian, who tells him that his family will just blame it on his condition. When the family come home, Zeke shows the footage of Ian taking the rings to Susan. Ian grabs his bag and tries to leave, but Tom reveals that he took his car keys. Rachel Kinski then calls the police, while Susan apologises to Tom.
23 July	Graham Brown	David Murray	Graham is the husband of Prue Brown and the father to Johnny, George, Pauline and Ringo. His youngest son, Paul died when he was 13 months old. Graham arrives in town for George's wedding.
10 August–1 November	Tyler Smith	Blake O'Leary; Brody McPharlane	Tyler is a school friend of Mickey Gannon.
13 August–21 November	Sophie Cooper	Emma Moore	Sophie is a Police Senior Constable who works with Adam Rhodes. Sophie deals with Richard Aaronow's complaint that his son Declan had tried to kill him and she later helps Rebecca Napier report Richard for raping her. Sophie does not get on with Adam's girlfriend Pepper Steiger as she knew her from high school. Sophie kisses Adam and he tells Pepper, who confronts Sophie about her bullying. Sophie finds Susan Kennedy in the car park of the local shopping centre, where she had gone blind. Sophie calls an ambulance and sits with Susan until her daughter Libby arrives.
22–28 August	Chantelle Rebecchi	Claire Chitham	Chantelle is the wife of Stonefish Rebecchi. Chantelle and Stonie often ran his family's business, while his parents would go travelling. When they suffered problems in starting a family, Stonie started drinking and taking drugs. Chantelle threw him out. She later follows him to Erinsborough and Stonie tells her that he is giving up the drugs, before apologising. Chantelle stays for a couple of days and the couple later head home, so Stonie can start seeing a counsellor.
3 September 2007 – 13 March 2008	Jackie Jones	Kristin Keam	Jackie is a councillor, who befriends Stephanie Scully after she is elected to the council. She explains to Steph how to get the other councillors to listen to her proposals. Steph invites Jackie and her new colleagues to her bar, Charlie's, but Jackie later informs her that her efforts were not enough to get her plans for a new childcare centre and a memorial for Stingray Timmins approved. Months later, Jackie becomes the Mayor of Erinsborough. When a warehouse collapses during an illegal rave, it emerges that Jackie used Steph's proxy vote to deny a motion that would have added security to the site. A class action lawsuit is launched, and Steph finds a document detailing all the faults with the warehouse in Jackie's office. After lawyer Toadfish Rebecchi sees it, he advises Jackie to offer the victims compensation, but she releases a fake document which puts the blame on Steph instead. Toadie, Rebecca Napier, and many of the victims walk into a council meeting, and talk about how the incident has affected them. While Jackie refuses to discuss the matter, her secretary suggests there should be an official enquiry. As Jackie realises that she is losing support amongst the councillors, she leaves and later resigns as Mayor.
6–26 September	Diana Murray	Jane Allsop	Diana Murray is a Barrister employed by the Rebecchi Cammeniti law firm after Rosetta Cammeniti is called away to Rome. Diana agrees to work for the company after she finds out that one of the cases would see her pitted against Tim Collins. Diana get involved in the custody battle for Mickey Gannon. Diana encourages Toadie to hire Rebecca Napier as a secretary. Rosetta returns from Italy and Diana tells her that her ex-husband Julian wants her to take on a big case with him. Diana then decides to leave for Sydney.
17 September – 11 October 2007, 10 June 2014	Laura Davidson	Jodi Flockhart	Laura is Gus Cleary's sister. Paul Robinson tracks Laura down to tell her that he killed Gus. Paul invites Laura and her boyfriend, Nick, to stay at Lassiter's and Laura feels guilty when she runs up a large bill, but Nick tells her they can use it to their advantage. Laura tries to push Paul into giving her money, but he explains that he cannot help as he no longer owns the hotel. Laura and Nick kidnap Declan Napier and hold him for a ransom. Laura later frees Declan and she and Nick are arrested. Seven years later, Laura returns to Erinsborough after learning that her other brother, Victor, is responsible for the murder of Paul's niece Kate Ramsay. Laura comes to the police station to tell them where they might find Victor. She meets Paul again and warns him to be careful as Victor would stop at nothing to get his revenge on Paul.
18 September–11 October	Nick Thompson	Marty Grimwood	Nick is Laura Davidson's boyfriend. When Paul Robinson admits to killing Laura's brother, he sees an opportunity to get even. Nick kidnaps Declan Napier and demands money from Declan's brother, Oliver. When the police close in on them, Laura frees Declan and she and Nick are arrested.
24–28 July	Dale Hunter	Leon Stripp	Dale and Wayne are Justin Hunter's older brothers. The three of them get into a verbal altercation with Declan Napier and Bridget Parker and chase after them when Bridget throws a drink at them which hits Wayne. Declan and Bridget get away after being chased down but when they get back to the car, it is vandalised. A few days later, the Hunters challenge Declan and Bridget to a drag race, which they accept. The police are quickly involved but they are more interested in chasing down the Hunters who are wanted for causing trouble in the area.
24–28 July	Wayne Hunter	Karl Van Moorsel	
26 September 2007 – 12 August 2008	Helen Carr	Margot Fenley	Helen Carr was a teacher and the Head of Senior School at Erinsborough High. During a staff meeting, PE teacher Pepper Steiger asks for funding for the sports department, but Helen rejects all of her ideas. Helen wants the money to go to the English department. Daniel Fitzgerald starts drawing cartoons of her and Helen sees one of them, but believes it was drawn by Ringo Brown and Jessica Wallace. Helen asks Daniel and Libby Kennedy to lead the senior school in dance classes for the formal. Daniel pulls out of the dance classes, so Helen puts him in charge of the formal's decorating committee. Helen also bans public displays of affection in the school. She later tells Daniel that she has got a new job at Western Girls' Grammar School and would be recommending him for the role of Head of Senior School. However, she later offers to back Libby's application instead.
4 December 2007 – 8 July 2008	Patrizia Silvani	Lise Rodgers	Patrizia is Marco and Mia Silvani's mother. When she meets Marco's business partner and girlfriend Carmella Cammeniti, she notices that she is pregnant. Patrizia talks with Marco and he tells her that he is happy to raise another man's child. Patrizia tells Carmella that she is glad to see Marco happy again. Marco dies following a bushfire and Patrizia is devastated. She blames Carmella. At the funeral, Patrizia gives a speech and apologises to Carmella.
5–6 December	Scott Coombes	Aidan Fennessy	Scott and Larissa are former classmates of Ned Parker and Kirsten Gannon. They meet when Ned, Kirsten and Ned's brother Steve and his wife, Miranda return to Oakey for the school reunion. Scott and Larrissa assume Ned and Kirsten are back together but they assure them they are not but are co-parenting their son Mickey. They are impressed when Miranda wins the mechanical bull challenge and later crown Ned and Kirsten King and Queen of the reunion and when Scott makes a joke about Ned and Kirsten finally getting together, Ned's girlfriend, Janae Timmins overhears and shoves Kirsten into a table.
5–6 December	Larissa McKay	Petra Glieson	
