= Kirsten Gannon =

- Neighbours character
- Portrayed by: Nikola Dubois
- Duration: 2007–2008
- First appearance: 19 June 2007
- Last appearance: 31 July 2008
- Introduced by: Ric Pellizzeri
In-universe information
- Occupation: Hairdresser; Barmaid; Lassiter's receptionist
- Sons: Mickey Gannon

Kirsten Gannon is a fictional character from the Australian soap opera Neighbours, played by Nikola Dubois. She made her first appearance during the episode broadcast on 19 June 2007. Kirsten was introduced into the series as the mother of Mickey Gannon (Fletcher O'Leary) and former partner of Ned Parker (Daniel O'Connor). As one of Neighbours' recurring characters, Kirsten appeared constantly for more than one year. She is characterised as manipulative and a "trouble maker". Kirsten's stories have included a custody battle over Mickey and her subsequent feud with Janae Timmins (Eliza Taylor-Cotter). The latter resulted in a blackmail scheme and her various attempts to ruin Janae's relationship with Ned. Writers also created an affair story with Paul Robinson (Stefan Dennis). Dubois has stated that her relationship with Paul showed her character to be a "lonely woman" rather than a "home wrecker". Kirsten's final storylines saw her suffering from severe burns after being caught in a bush fire. The character departed the show on 31 July 2008.

== Casting ==
Dubois auditioned for the role successfully and found the process easy. Dubois recounted, "It was a strange audition because I remember reading the scene and I just understood where this poor woman was coming from. And I didn't need to learn the lines either... I just knew them." Dubois was originally only contracted for three works of filming as the character was only intended to guest in the series. Producers felt there was potential in keeping the character and Dubois added that "I was really only ever meant to be on the show for three weeks, but the writers liked the way I took the character and so they invited me back for another month. It just kept happening like that, an extra few months here and there, and before I knew it, I'd been on the show for over a year!" She was both "shocked" and "excited" to play the role and concluded "I was even more shocked when my agent called to tell me they wanted me to come back and then have an affair with Paul Robinson!"

== Development ==
=== Custody battle ===
Kirsten was portrayed as a scheming, at times desperate character who tried her best to achieve high, but often failed due to her bad choices. Of this Dubois stated during an interview about her character: "Kirsten was really fun to play. It's always fun playing the trouble maker. I think Kirsten was really misunderstood on Ramsay Street – she never found a place where she belonged... and she so desperately wanted to fit in." Also adding: "Mickey was her number one priority. She did everything that she did because she wanted to be something Mickey could be proud of. I think she made a lot of mistakes – but desperation sometimes makes you do things without thinking first." She has also described Kirsten as desperate at time, due to her troubled past, but brave.

Kirsten decides she wants custody of Mickey but Ned Parker (Daniel O'Connor) created a family unit for Mickey, with his girlfriend Janae Timmins (Eliza Taylor-Cotter). Writers showcased Kirsten's manipulative persona as she tries to make Ned and Janae appear unable to cope with Mickey. Janae had managed to keep her restraint around Kirsten, which was unlike her usual feisty persona. Taylor-Cotter told a reporter from Inside Soap that "a fight between Janae and Kirsten has been brewing for a while." Kirsten begins to scheme against Janae in the hope that she will lose her temper. When Ned forgets Mickey's birthday, Kirsten decides to organise a big party for him, which makes Ned look uncaring. Kirsten makes Ned feel "terrible" and Taylor-Cotter explained "that's like a red rag to a bull for Janae, who accuses Kirsten of playing dirty." Kirsten's lawyer Tim Collins (Ben Anderson) convinces her to carry on antagonising Janae to get a reaction. Kirsten decides to show affection towards Ned and brands the Timmins family as criminals, knowing Janae is watching. Taylor-Cotter added that "just as you'd expect, Janae loses it and throws a drink in her face." Kirsten gains an advantage in the custody battle as she reports Janae to the police for assaulting her.

Kirsten returns to Erinsborough following a break and claims to have changed her behaviour. Janae is not convinced and believes Kirsten is actually trying to get back together with Ned. Taylor-Cotter believed that Janae found it difficult to expose Kirsten because she has "cleaned up her act". She described Kirsten as a "bad mother" and "twice as dangerous". Kirsten convinces Ned to allow her to spend more time with Mickey. Janae witnesses Kirsten picking Mickey up from school and mistakenly believes she is kidnapping him. Janae reports Kirsten to the police who take no action when Ned reveals he allowed it. Kirsten is delighted when the incident causes Ned and Janae to argue. Taylor-Cotter added "it ends up causing a bit of drama, which is exactly what Kirsten wants" and that "poor little Mickey" was caught up in Kirsten and Janae's feud.

Kirsten and Ned decide to attend a school reunion in Oakey, Queensland. Janae also decides attend without informing Ned. Ned's car breaks down and while they wait for help, Kirsten kisses him. Taylor-Cotter said "Ned pushes Kirsten away, it's very awkward." Despite his rejection, Kirsten carries on to Oakey with Ned, when they arrive at the reunion they are crowned "King and Queen" of the event. But Janae sees them together and attacks Kirsten, not knowing that Ned rebuffed her advances. The actress said that "in front of everyone she accuses Ned of cheating - and gives Kirsten a shove she won't forget."

Kirsten continues to causes problems and later witnesses Janae kissing Darren Stark (Todd MacDonald). Kirsten begins to blackmail Janae in exchange for keeping the kiss a secret. Taylor-Cotter explained that "Kirsten tells her she'll keep her secret on one condition - that Janae talks Ned into giving her more access to her son, Mickey." The kiss would not remain secret and Dan Bennett from Network Ten revealed that "very early on, the kiss will be exposed. Kirsten saw it all and being the vindictive ex that she is, she'll make Janae's life hell. The relationship between Janae & Ned is very much tested after her kiss."

=== Affair with Paul Robinson ===
Writers soon created a story in which Kirsten has an affair Paul Robinson (Stefan Dennis), who is in a relationship with Rebecca Napier (Jane Hall). They developed an increasing attraction between the two, with Paul finding it more difficult to resist temptation when Kirsten explains the damaging repercussions an affair would have. Rebecca begins to prioritise work before her relationship with Paul, which makes him act on his feelings and start an affair with Kirsten. Paul's daughter Elle Robinson (Pippa Black) discovers their affair and tries to protect Rebecca. Kirsten agrees to accompany Paul on a trip to Europe to spend time together. Dubois defended her character's actions and believed that Kirsten was a "lonely woman" rather than a "home wrecker". The actress told a writer from Inside Soap that "Kirsten thought Paul and Rebecca were history when they first slept together. Then Paul sweet talked her with the holiday to Europe. How could she say no?" Kirsten decides she must tell Rebecca about the affair and returns to Erinsborough before Paul does. She visits Rebecca, who is happy to see Kirsten and changes her friendliness changes Kirsten's mind. Dubois revealed that Kirsten thinks Rebecca is "nice" and "in any other situation, they'd be pals." Elle decides to try to force Kirsten out of Erinsborough and fires her from her job at Lassiters.

Paul's ex-wife Lyn Scully discovers their affair but and tells Susan Kennedy (Jackie Woodburne), who decides to tell Rebecca the truth. Dennis said that Paul regrets his affair with Kirsten and branded it "the biggest mistake of his life." Paul tries to make Rebecca believe it was a "one time thing", despite them continuing their affair while they were in Paris. In 2018, Dennis told Saskia Tillers from TV Week that "it was more of a relationship of convenience for Paul. She was this hot, young blonde, and he thought, 'I'll have a bit of that, thanks!' And so he did. He used Kirsten and then it all went horribly wrong."

=== Bush fire and departure ===
Kirsten was featured in the show's 2008 bush fire story. A reporter from the Daily Star revealed that one character would be killed off during the bush fire but confirmed that Kirsten would survive. On-screen Kirsten helps with the bush fire rescue operation but becomes trapped and succumbs to the flames, but is ultimately saved by Ned. Natalie Blair who plays Carmella Cammeniti, told Inside Soap's Jason Herbison that the other characters do not realise Kirsten has returned to the fire zone to search for Ned. She added that Kirsten is overcome by the smoke and collapses in the middle of the fire.

Kirsten later remembers that Paul left her for dead. Elle suspects that Paul started the fire and visits Kirsten in hospital. Dennis said that Kirsten remembers that Paul drove off in the same vehicle that Elle knew Paul was driving at the time. He defended his character's actions because Paul thought she had died. He added "she had collapsed and wasn't moving, Paul never would have left Kirsten there if he thought she was alive." Paul's actions resulted in Kirsten sustaining severe burns, which she forgave Paul for. Dennis explained that "not only did he use her, he left her for dead. The remarkable thing is she forgave him for what he did to her. She ended up with horrific burns, and she actually had the goodness to say to Paul that she forgave him."

Kirsten's story concluded with her needing specialised treatment for her burns in Perth. When Ned's family offer to help, she refuses because of the financial strain. When Ned confronts Paul, he feels guilty and offers to fund the treatment. Kirsten departed during the episode broadcast on 31 July 2008. Ned and Mickey were also written out of the series during the episode. Her departure scenes featured her being transferred to the Perth hospital and her family moving with her.

== Storylines ==
Kirsten had a relationship with Ned when they were both teenagers. Kristen's parents died just before she gave birth to Mickey (Fletcher O'Leary) and she moved in with her grandparents. Kirsten's grandparents die shortly before she comes to Ramsay Street. Kirsten tells Ned he is Mickey's father and she leaves her son with him. She returns a few weeks later and reveals she is unable to look after Mickey anymore and she departs alone. Kirsten realises she wants Mickey back. She finds him in a park and tries to convince him to go with her by telling him Ned would not care about him if he went. When Ned discovers Kirsten attempts to unfairly woo Mickey, he launches a bid for custody. Mickey chooses to stay with Ned, but Kirsten decides to take him with her. After days of searching, Ned and his partner Janae find Kirsten and Mickey. Kirsten decides to let Mickey stay with his father. Kirsten catches Janae kissing Darren Stark and she threatens to tell Ned. After the truth comes out, Janae leaves Ramsay Street.

Kirsten gets a job at Lassiter's Hotel and she begins an affair with her boss, Paul. Kirsten breaks off the affair when she learns Paul is still with Rebecca. However, they get back together when Paul tells Kirsten he will give up Rebecca for her. Elle discovers the affair and tells Kirsten to leave Ramasy Street. Elle chooses not to tell Rebecca as she does not want to break up the family. Kirsten meets Paul in Paris, while she is on holiday with Mickey. When Kirsten returns she goes straight to Number 22 intending to tell Rebecca she has ended the relationship with Paul. Elle tells her to keep quiet and threatens to fire her from Lassiter's. Rebecca learns of Paul affair and her friends ostracise Kirsten. Kirsten joins a group helping to clear areas of the bush. A fire breaks out and she is badly injured. Ned rescues her and she is rushed to hospital. Paul visits Kirsten and tells her he left her for dead in the fire. Kirsten forgives him. Paul offers to pay for Kirsten's hospital treatment and she, Ned and Mickey move to Perth so she could receive better treatment.

== Reception ==
For her portrayal of Kirsten, Dubois was nominated in the "Best Bitch" category at the "2008 Inside Soap Awards".
