= Adam Rhodes =

- Neighbours character
- Portrayed by: Benjamin Hart
- First appearance: 14 June 2007
- Last appearance: 29 November 2007
- Introduced by: Ric Pellizzeri
In-universe information
- Occupation: Constable

Adam Rhodes is a fictional character from the Australian Network Ten soap opera Neighbours, played by Benjamin Hart. The character debuted on-screen during the episode airing on 14 June 2007 and left on 29 November 2007.

== Creation and casting ==
Adam was created as part of the 2007 revamp of the serial. He was also a new long-term love interest for existing character Pepper Steiger (Nicky Whelan). A British actor was sought to play the role, a move made by producers in the hope of attracting new viewers in the UK. Former Hollyoaks actor Benjamin Hart was eventually cast. He received help in getting the part from his friend Dannii Minogue, who used her agent and negotiated a deal on a contract. Of how the casting worked Hart stated: "I was due to fly out that day back to London, but on my way to the airport I went to see Neighbours casting boss Jan Russ and within 10 minutes of leaving her office, they called and offered me the part." Regarding Minogue's involvement, he said "I was here with her in December and this time madame totally orchestrated it." In July 2007 it was announced that Whelan had cut her contract short with the serial and left. With his on-screen love interest departing, it was then revealed that Hart's six-month contract would not be renewed, but the door would be left open for his character to return in the future.

== Characterisation ==
Network Ten describe Adam as being a tall, dark, handsome and uber-macho British backpacker. He is described as liking Australian people over fellow backpackers. The add he is "a down-to-earth bloke who tells it like it is" and "Pepper's knight in shining armour".

== Storylines ==
Adam arrives as a construction worker who rescued Pepper from the unwanted advances of Karl Kennedy's (Alan Fletcher) new boss, Davo (Stephen Jenkins). Adam then starts to flirt with Pepper at every opportunity. She eventually admits that she is attracted to him and accepts when he asks her out on a date. When Pepper's father, Allan Steiger (Joe Clements), finds out about Pepper's involvement with Adam, he soon becomes suspicious that he may be "bad news", and soon Pepper becomes to grow wary as well, thinking he is a criminal. Adam confesses to Pepper that he was a police officer in England, and he was consumed with guilt because his negligence had resulted in his partner being shot dead during an investigation. Adam leaves town, feeling that Pepper will be better off without him. He later comes to his senses when he realises that he was running away from his problems and also how much he loves Pepper; he shows up at the Timmins farewell barbecue and tells Pepper he wants to stay and figure his life out. They want to get married so Adam can get a visa. However Christine Rodd (Trudy Hellier), Pepper's mother, convinces them it was a bad idea to get married so early on, so the pair try to think of another way to get Adam a visa.

Adam decides in order to get a visa he will rejoin the police force. He has to undergo a psych evaluation to return to the force. Once he is reinstated as a Constable, his new partner is Senior Constable Sophie Cooper (Emma Moore). When Pepper is diagnosed with cervical dysplasia, Adam sticks by her, and she gets through it, having regular checks that the cancer has not spread. Adam moves to Queensland with Pepper on 1 November 2007, but returns briefly to sort out a job transfer. He departs Erinsborough on 29 November, after telling Frazer Yeats (Ben Lawson) and Rosetta Cammeniti (Natalie Saleeba) that he will be asking Pepper to marry him.
