= Ned Parker =

- Neighbours character
- Portrayed by: Daniel O'Connor
- Duration: 2005–2008
- First appearance: 9 August 2005
- Last appearance: 31 July 2008
- Introduced by: Ric Pellizzeri
In-universe information
- Occupation: Singer; Parking inspector Nanny; Personal Trainer; Mechanic; Football coach
- Father: Jim Parker
- Mother: Kitty Parker
- Brothers: Stuart Parker
- Half-brothers: Steve Parker
- Sons: Mickey Gannon
- Aunts: Raylene Manson
- Nephews: Riley Parker
- Nieces: Bridget Parker
- Other relatives: India Napier

Ned Parker is a fictional character from the Australian soap opera Neighbours, played by Daniel O'Connor. He made his first appearance on screen on 9 August 2005, arriving to see his brother, Stuart. He departed on 31 July 2008.

== Casting ==
Following his elimination from the 2004 series of Australian Idol, Daniel O'Connor was asked to join the cast of Neighbours as Ned Parker. O'Connor's agent informed him that someone from Neighbours had called and was interested in him doing an audition for the show. O'Connor had not considered acting and thought the offer to meet with casting director, Jan Russ was "ridiculous". He said "I have no idea why they wanted me, I don't know what it was or what they saw in me. I got to number 11 in Idol, so I didn't even progress to the pointy end of the competition". O'Connor add that Russ could sense he was "freaked out" during the audition and that he had to come back for a second one to perform some emotionally challenging scenes. O'Connor said his first day on the set was one of the most terrifying experiences of his life.

In February 2008, it was announced that O'Connor was to leave Neighbours that year, along with co-stars David Hoflin (Oliver Barnes), Jesse Rosenfeld (Marco Silvani) and Sweeney Young (Riley Parker). It was speculated that the departures were linked to the arrival of Susan Bower, who was appointed executive producer at the end of 2007.

== Storylines ==
Ned is the younger brother of Stuart (Blair McDonough) and Steve Parker (Steve Bastoni). Ned arrives in Erinsborough to attends Stuart's wedding to Sindi Watts (Marisa Warrington). He later returns to check on Stuart after Sindi is sectioned and sent to a psychiatric hospital. Upon his arrival in Ramsay Street, Ned goes to the wrong house and takes a shower. Janelle Timmins (Nell Feeney) is shocked to see Ned in just a towel and she screams for help, Ned then drops his towel. Susan Kennedy (Jackie Woodburne) recognises Ned from the wedding and points him in the direction of Stuart's place. Stuart tells Ned that he doesn't want to discuss his situation with him, but Ned helps Stuart out and decides to stay in Ramsay Street. Ned quickly developed a crush on Isabelle Hoyland (Natalie Bassingthwaighte) and became friends with Elle Robinson (Pippa Black).

When Ned became quite secretive, Toadfish Rebecchi (Ryan Moloney) jumped to the conclusion that Ned was gay. Stuart was shocked when Ned admitted that he was. However, he later tells Elle that he isn't and that he only told Toadie and Stuart he was, so he could audition for a musical in secret. Ned is given a role in Gino Esposito's (Shane McNamara) musical, but he struggles with the script. He finally admits to Elle that he is having trouble reading and they begin a relationship. Isabelle seduces Ned and he tells her that she has to leave Paul Robinson (Stefan Dennis) and be with him. Isabelle later admits to Paul that she slept with Ned.

Ned teams up with Karl Kennedy (Alan Fletcher) to form a children's band called "Oodles 'O' Noodles". They later split when Ned meets Justine Spensley (Alexis Porter) and she forces Karl to quit the group. However, Carmella Cammeniti (Natalie Blair) exposes Justine's plan and Ned and Karl reform the band. Ned then began a relationship with Carmella, but she ended it when she realised that they were spending too much time together. Ned then grew close to Katya Kinski (Dichen Lachman), and a jealous Carmella unsuccessfully tried to win him back. Ned ended his relationship with Katya when she was blackmailed into several crimes, even assaulting Ned when he caught her stealing a car.

Ned moved in with Stephanie Scully (Carla Bonner) when he was forced out of his home by his new housemates. Ned got into gambling and Paul lured Ned into a life of crime and his plan to destroy the Timmins family to help repay his debts. Ned later asks Elle to run away with him, but she returns to her father and Ned leaves by himself. On his return, Ned apologised to the Timmins family and began working at the garage with Janae Timmins (Eliza Taylor-Cotter).

Ned's high school girlfriend, Kirsten Gannon (Nikola Dubois) appears at his doorstep and informs him that he has an eight-year-old son, Mickey (Fletcher O'Leary). Kirsten leaves Mickey with Ned and he enlists Janae to help him raise his son. Janae later asks Ned to move in with her and they begin a relationship. Ned's older brother Steve and his family arrive in Ramsay Street and when Steve tells Ned that their new home has been flooded, Janae invites them to move in. Kirsten returns and Ned tells her that he will fight for main custody of Mickey. Kirsten tries to take Mickey away, but Mickey tells her that he would rather live with Ned and she returns him home. Ned and Janae's relationship comes to an end and Janae leaves Ramsay Street after kissing Darren Stark (Todd MacDonald). Ned then began to grow closer to Kirsten.

When Steve tells Ned that their father was once a vicious drunk and a cheating husband, Ned refuses to believe him. Ned takes Kirsten and Mickey to Oakey to meet the family and he brings his father, Jim (Roger Oakley) back to Ramsay Street. Ned and Kirsten are caught in a bush fire. Kirsten is badly injured and Ned saves her. Ned later decides to leave Erinsborough with Mickey and Kirsten, so that Kirsten could get treatment for her burns.

== Reception ==
O'Connor was nominated for 'Most Popular New Male Talent' at the 2006 Logie Awards for his portrayal of Ned. In 2007, O'Connor and co-star Natalie Blair (Carmella Cammeniti) were named 'King and Queen of Teen' at Dolly magazine's Dolly Teen Choice Awards.

Ned has received negative criticism from Ruth Deller of television website Lowculture.co.uk. In a feature specially dedicated to Ned called "Clearing out the dead wood", Deller expressed her delight that the character was leaving Neighbours. She went on to say "Whilst Dan O'Connor's acting has been somewhat short of stellar, he can't take the sole blame for Ned's failure at becoming a character viewers took to their hearts. The scriptwriters never seemed to know what to do with him". Deller added that Ned had been portrayed as being sometimes thick, sometimes kind and sometimes selfish. She said "The only time he almost became likeable was when his son Mickey arrived, but seeing as the kid was only tolerable in scenes with Lou and Harold, that didn’t really work, either. He did get his kit off quite a lot though, so every cloud and all that". She finished by saying that Ned was the least loved of the Parker brothers.

In a feature on the best and worst soap characters of the decade, Ned was placed first on the worst characters list. Deller said "Thick as two short planks, with their acting ability, Ned's storylines revolved around rubbish romances and being rubbish at a string of jobs. They even twisted the knife in by introducing more family members when Stu left in order to enable him to stick around even longer. The saddest thing about his departure was that they didn't even kill him off". Describing Ned, media company Virgin Media state: "Life was action packed for Ramsay Street macho-man, Ned. As well as constantly showing off his buff bod, he also discovered he had a secret son with an ex-high school flame and got caught up in a love triangle with Katya Kinski and Carmella Cammeniti." Katie Baillie writing for Metro included Ned on her list of the "worst Neighbours characters" ever. Ed Jefferson from the Daily Mirror named Ned and Karl starting a children's musical "awful" pop group as one of the weirdest Neighbours storylines, calling the pop group "awful".
