= Pepper Steiger =

- Neighbours character
- Portrayed by: Nicky Whelan
- Duration: 2006–2007
- First appearance: 12 October 2006
- Last appearance: 1 November 2007
- Introduced by: Ric Pellizzeri
In-universe information
- Occupation: P.E. and health teacher
- Father: Allan Steiger
- Mother: Christine Rodd
- Stepmother: Janelle Timmins

Heidi "Pepper" Steiger is a fictional character from the Australian soap opera Neighbours, played by Nicky Whelan. The character was introduced into the serial as part of a group of four characters branded as "20 somethings". She made her debut in the episode broadcast on 12 October 2006. Pepper left the soap on 1 November 2007 after Whelan quit her contract. During her stint in the serial Pepper was involved in notable storylines including a same-sex kiss, a hostage situation and cervical dysplasia.

== Creation and casting ==
Pepper was created in 2006 along with another three characters created at the same time as part of a new group of "20 somethings". Natalie Saleeba, Ben Lawson and Christian Clark were cast as Rosetta Cammeniti, Frazer Yeats and Will Griggs respectively, around the same time as Nicky Whelan was cast as Pepper. Their inclusion within the serial was part of the producers attempts to introduce more contemporary characters, despite not knowing each other they all share the same house upon their on-screen debuts, a first for the series. Pepper was scripted as having immediate family connections within the serial in the form of father and already established character Allan Steiger (Joe Clements) and mother Christine Rodd (Trudy Hellier). Whelan was about to start her career in Los Angeles when she received confirmation that she had won the role, so she decided to stay and play Pepper.

== Development ==
Before appearing on-screen Pepper was described as a "neurotic hypochondriac" Pepper has been portrayed as sometimes being a little kooky and clumsy. One of her characteristics shown regularly on-screen is her constant sneezing when she is nervous. The sneezing trait was already implemented to the character before Whelan was cast in the role. During an interview Whelan described Pepper's persona in depth, stating: "She's very similar to your early Goldie Hawn, who I love". further adding: "She's blonde, everyone thinks she a bimbo, but she's not. She's full of life and full of energy. She's one of those people who says way too much too soon. Then realises and thinks, 'S..., I shouldn't have said that'."

In early 2007, Neighbours featured a same-sex kiss between Pepper and Rosetta. Whelan explained that Pepper and Rosie were both going through a tough time, and the kiss developed in the heat of the moment. The kiss was witnessed by Ringo Brown (Sam Clark) and he assumed that Pepper and Rosie had become a couple. However, Ringo did not hear them admit that the kiss was a mistake, so he went around telling everyone what he had seen. When Frazer heard about the kiss, he took it to mean that Rosie what not interested in him and Pepper tried to set him straight. Thing got out of hand when Rosie started questioning whether she was gay and Whelan commented, "Pepper's thinking, 'You must be kidding!'" Whelan found the kissing scene fun to film, but added that she was not sure about Pepper's motivation, saying "She had a big problem with her mum, Chris, turning out to be gay, but then she goes and kisses Rosie. Something just doesn't add up!" Richard Clune from The Daily Telegraph observed that the kiss "failed to spark audience interest" and mostly went unnoticed along with a number of would be controversial plots.

After Pepper went for a routine pap test, the results showed that she had abnormal cells. Following more tests, Pepper was diagnosed with cervical dysplasia. Whelan said Pepper reacted "in the same way anybody would. A billion things run through her mind, she freaks out and she's really frightened - especially because she doesn't have a lot of knowledge of the condition and she hears the word cancer and her ears prick up. It's sad and it's scary." The actress was not happy with the initially scripts as they were quite comical and she thought that the condition should have been taken more seriously. The scripts were changed and Whelan hoped that the storyline would make people more aware of the condition. Pepper initially kept her diagnosis to herself, but eventually told Adam Rhodes (Benjamin Hart), who was very supportive of her. Whelan told Jackie Brygel from TV Week that Pepper was frightened of the operation and coming out of it, she has "a billion questions" for the doctors, as she needs to know everything. Whelan thought Pepper "freaks out more than she needs to" following the surgery, especially as she could not have sex for a month and it became an issue.

Whelan quit Neighbours 13 months into her three-year contract and filmed her final scenes in July 2007. In an interview with TV Week's Thomas Mitchell in June 2013, Whelan revealed that she would be willing to return to Neighbours. She said, "I am forever grateful to Neighbours. They took me on with no acting experience. I learnt so much from people like Ben Lawson and Natalie Saleeba. So who knows Pepper could come back. I don't know if they'd have me."

== Storylines ==
Pepper grew up in Erinsborough and attended the local high school. When she earned her teaching degree, she decided to return to her old school as the new physical education and health teacher. Pepper teams up with her friend Frazer Yeats to get a room at Number 30 Ramsay Street. They pose as an engaged couple and successfully pass the interview. They move in with Rosetta Cammeniti and Will Griggs. Frazer develops feelings for Rosetta, which makes his fake engagement to Pepper harder to maintain. On her first day at Erinsborough High, Pepper attracts the attentions of her male students, particularly Zeke Kinski (Matthew Werkmeister). Pepper admits to Rosie that her engagement to Frazer is fake and Rosie tells her that she is still a virgin. Pepper falls for Frazer and seduces him. Realising that he has feelings for Rosie, Pepper later backs off. Pepper sleepwalks and tells Zeke she loves him, although she believes she is talking to Frazer. Zeke tells Pepper he loves her during a party thrown by her parents to celebrate her engagement.

Pepper tells her parents that her engagement is off and then tries to get them back together. Her mother then admits that she had been dating a woman for the past year and Pepper refuses to speak to her mother. Pepper begins a secret relationship with Paul Robinson (Stefan Dennis). Rosie learns that Frazer is really the brother of her ex-fiancé, and Pepper tells her about Paul. While they are bonding over their various troubles with men, Pepper and Rosie kiss. They quickly realise it was a mistake, but it was witnessed by Frazer's younger brother, Ringo (Sam Clark), who told everyone about it. When Pepper realises that her student, Lolly Allen (Adelaide Kane), is being abused, she tries to help her. However, Lolly panics and tells Susan Kennedy (Jackie Woodburne) that Pepper hit her. Pepper is suspended from work and she turns to her mother for support. It soon emerges that Lolly's stepmother has been abusing her and Pepper was cleared of any wrongdoing.

Pepper begins receiving mysterious gifts and cards. She believes they might be from a student or Paul, but when a birthday cake for an eight-year-old arrives, Pepper tells Rosie that she became pregnant when she was seventeen to her then boyfriend, Kevin Casey (Zen Ledden), but she later miscarried. Pepper tells her father about the gifts and the pregnancy. When they cannot find Kevin, Pepper and Allan visit his mother Mary Casey (Rowena Wallace) and she tells them Kevin was acting oddly the last time she saw him. Kevin is found and questioned by the police, but denies sending the gifts. Pepper visits Mary again and stays for tea and cake. Pepper leaves for a party, when she passes out and has to go to the hospital. Pepper returns to Mary's house to find out what happened and soon realise that Mary is her stalker. Mary knocks her out and locks her and Kevin in a nursery. Kevin and Pepper pretend they are back together, and when Mary brings them a candlelit dinner, Pepper sets the room on fire. Mary opens the door and they manage to escape. Mary is later arrested.

Pepper returns home and is unable to tell Frazer and Rosie about her ordeal, until Kevin turns up to apologise. Pepper meets English builder Adam Rhodes and agrees to go on a date with him. They get on well and begin dating. When Adam meets Allan, he quickly leaves upon seeing his police uniform. Pepper confronts Adam and he explains that he was a police officer until his partner was shot dead. Adam decides to leave town and Pepper becomes depressed. Adam soon returns and he and Pepper get back together. When Adam explains that his visa is about to run out, Pepper proposes to him and he accepts. However, they decide not to get married and Adam rejoins the police force instead. Pepper goes for a pap test and is diagnosed with cervical dysplasia. After undergoing surgery, Pepper is told that she cannot have sex for a month. Pepper then becomes insecure when she learns Adam's police partner is Sophie Cooper (Emma Moore), who bullied Pepper in high school. Sophie tries to kiss Adam and Pepper confronts her, leading Sophie to apologise for bullying her.

Pepper notices that Ringo has developed an eating disorder and tries to help him, by telling him about her own experiences with anorexia. When Pepper learns her father has contracted malaria, she decides to visit him. She then finds a job opportunity in Cairns and quits her job at the school, without telling Adam. She asks Daniel Fitzgerald (Brett Tucker) to keep an eye on Ringo. Adam finds out about the Cairns job and realises that Pepper has been keeping her options open, in case he did not want to move away with her. Adam storms off, but while Pepper is saying her goodbyes, Adam turns up with his bags and announces he is going with her. Pepper says goodbye to Rosie and she and Adam leave Ramsay Street.

== Reception ==
For her portrayal of Pepper, Whelan was nominated for Best Newcomer and Sexiest Female at the 2008 Digital Spy Soap Awards. Natalie Craig writing for The Sydney Morning Herald used Pepper's name as an example to prove that Neighbours' naming schemes were "as ludicrous as ever". Roz Laws from the Sunday Mercury agreed with Craig, calling Pepper's name "silly".
