= Lights Camera Dead =

- Theatrical release poster
- Directed by: Tim Reaper
- Written by: Monica Reaper; Tim Reaper
- Produced by: Mean Gene
- Starring: Scott Johnson; Richard Christy
- Cinematography: Jonathan Straiton
- Edited by: Jonathan Straiton
- Music by: Tim Reaper
- Production companies: Aisthesis Productions; Duke Studios
- Distributed by: White Lightning Productions
- Release date: 2007
- Running time: 77 minutes
- Country: United States
- Language: English

Lights Camera Dead is a 2007 American independent horror comedy film, directed by Indie filmmaker Tim Reaper and stars Richard Christy.

== Plot ==
Lights Camera Dead is the tale of a die-hard filmmaker and an ever-so-pretentious screenwriter, who will stop at nothing to complete their self-proclaimed zombie masterpiece “The Music Box.” On production day 666, a fed-up cast and crew quit, shutting down production. But not for long... the fast, efficient filmmakers devise a plan to finish their flick... and there will be blood!

== Cast ==
- Wes Reid as Ryan Black
- Amy Lollo as Kari Price
- J.C. Lira as Steven Didymus
- Monica Moehring as Melanie
- Coldon Martin as Ted
- Ashby Brooks as T-Love
- Stephanie Caston as Kari's mother
- Richard Christy as The Composer
- Melanie Fox as Melanie's boss
- Meggie Hirsch as Audition 1
- Scott Johnson as Alan
- Lee Kallman as Audition 2
- John Patton as Redneck
- Rob Rozier as Redneck Audition
- Garrett Weeda as Patrick
- Hunter White as The Editor

== Release ==
It was released in 2007 and was distributed by White Lighting Productions.
