= Heidi Valkenburg =

Australian actress, artist and writer

Heidi Valkenburg is an Australian actress, artist and writer.

She began acting at an early age, and her first big break came in 2000 when she was cast for the role of Penny Gallagher in the children's series Crash Zone alongside Cassandra Magrath, Nikolai Nikolaeff, Paul Pantano, Frances Wang, Damien Bodie and Nicky Wendt. Subsequently, this led to roles on other programs; Blue Heelers, Something in the Air and Fergus McPhail. In 2007, Valkenburg was cast as Jessica Wallace on the Australian soap opera Neighbours. Valkenburg admitted she was a fan of the show before joining stating that "It’s always been on (the show) whilst my...family and I have dinner. Hence why [sic] I was so nervous joining the cast! The ... familiar faces freaked me out!" In between these roles she has appeared on various commercials including one for local product Philadelphia cheese spread. Once hosted the children's program Kids' WB on Channel 9 and Go!. She also does various charity works and is a keen photographer and painter. Heidi has exhibited her art work in Melbourne, Australia.

Valkenburg is the third child of six, has three sisters and two brothers.

== Filmography ==
=== Film ===
Year	Film	Role
2013	Bound by Blue	Mia
2010	I Love You Too	Jenny

=== Television ===
Year	TV Series	Role	Note
2015	Utopia	Angela	Series 2, episode 7
2013	It's a Date	Alison	
2012	Jack Irish: Black Tide	Ricky's Blonde	TV film
2011	Winners & Losers	Kara Martini	
2011	Underbelly Files: Tell Them Lucifer was Here	Girl behind counter	TV film
2010	Tangle	Tosloo	
2007-2008	Neighbours	Jessica Wallace	
2004	Fergus McPhail	Maddie	
2001-2002	Something in the Air	Claire	
2000-2001	Crash Zone	Penny Gallagher	

=== Short films ===
Year	Film	Role
2013	Roy & Betsie	Betsie
2012	Supermarket Django	Martina
2009	Zombie Holocaust & You!	Reporter
