= Jonathan Patrick Moore =

Australian actor

- Born: 1982 (age 43–44)
- Other name: Jonathan Wood
- Occupation: Actor
- Years active: 2004–present

Jonathan Patrick Moore, previously known as Jonathan Wood, is an Australian actor who has appeared in theatre, film and television.

== Early life ==
Wood was born in Australia in 1982. His mother, Patricia Moore, was killed in a car accident in Adelaide, before his 10th birthday. He graduated from the Adelaide Centre for Performing Arts in 2004.

== Career ==
Wood's first acting role was a guest role on McLeod's Daughters in 2005. He made his breakthrough when he won a role on the Australian television soap opera Neighbours. Wood portrayed Angus Henderson, a man who has an inappropriate relationship with Rachel Kinski (played by Caitlin Stasey). After leaving Neighbours in 2008, Wood began to secure film roles including a role in The Directors Cut which was nominated as Best Drama at the West Australian Screen Awards.

Upon moving to the United States, Wood was told by his agent that the Screen Actors Guild needed him to change his name because they already had a Jonathan Wood in the union. He had a supporting role in the television film William & Kate: The Movie, as Prince William's friend Ian. Wood continued his television roles in All Saints during 2009.

In 2012, Moore was a series regular on the Canadian and American drama series The L.A. Complex. The show premiered on CTV Television Network in Canada before moving to MuchMusic. In the U.S., the show aired on The CW network. The show lasted two seasons, totalling 19 episodes.

In 2016, Moore was cast in a recurring role in the second season of NBC's Blindspot. The show was created by Martin Gero, who also created The L.A. Complex. Moore plays Oliver Kind, a water conservation specialist who befriends the protagonist, Jane Doe, played by Jaimie Alexander. He also appeared as Ben Morton in New Life.

== Filmography ==
=== Film ===
Year	Title	Role	Notes
2006	Elephant Tales	Zef (voice)	
2009	The Director's Cut	Mike	
2012	Savages	Beach Guy	
2012	The Mistle-Tones	Nick Anderson	
2014	Christian Mingle	Paul Wood	
2015	A Kind of Magic	Colin	
2015	Nouvelle Vie	Ben Morton	English: New Life
2015	Oh my god, forgive me	Caleb	Short film, post-production
2016	Bad Plus	Matt	Short film, post-production

=== Television ===
Year	Title	Role	Notes
2005	McLeod's Daughters	Justin O'Connor	"Heaven and Earth"
2007–2008	Neighbours	Angus Henderson	Recurring role
2008	Underbelly	Det. McManus	"Team Purana"
2008	Satisfaction	Toby	"What Do You Love"
2009	All Saints	Elliott Parker	Recurring role
2011	William & Kate: The Movie	Ian Musgrave	TV film
2012	Blue-Eyed Butcher	Billy	TV film
2012	The L.A. Complex	Connor Lake	Main role
2012	The Mistle-Tones	Nick Anderson	TV film
2013	NCIS	Kip Logan	"Under the Radar"
2014	Royal Pains	Aaron	"All in the Family"
2014	Rizzoli & Isles	Jason Sullivan	"Phoenix Rising"
2014	Back to Christmas	Nick	TV film
2015	The Right Girl	Michael Goodley	TV film, post-production
2016	Blindspot	Oliver Kind	Recurring Role
2020	Follow Your Heart	Jack Burley	Hallmark Movie
2021	9-1-1 (TV series)	Brian	"Jinx"
