= Mr. Right (2009 film) =

- Theatrical release poster
- Directed by: David Morris; Jacqui Morris
- Written by: David Morris
- Produced by: Jacqui Morris (producer); Jonathaon Perchal (exec. producer); Mugshots Production Co.
- Starring: James Lance; Luke de Woolfson; David Morris; Benjamin Hart; Rocky Marshall; Leon Ockenden
- Cinematography: Michael Wood
- Edited by: Warren Meneely
- Music by: Jacqueline Kroft
- Release date: 13 July 2009 (Outfest Film Festival)
- Running time: 94 minutes
- Country: United Kingdom
- Language: English

Mr. Right is a 2009 British film directed by David Morris and Jacqui Morris. The jointly-made gay-themed film is the debut for both directors.

== Synopsis ==
The film presents life of a number of individuals who live in London's Soho area in their quest for their "Mr. Right". One of the highlights of the film is when all the characters gather for an excruciatingly awkward and hilarious dinner party at which wine and secrets are spilled.

- Harry (James Lance) is a TV producer but dreams to get away. He loves Alex (Luke de Woolfson), an aspiring yet insecure actor who also works as a caterer. Meanwhile Alex is struggling to create an identity for himself and decides to live independently through monetary help from his brother despite Harry wanting him back
- Tom (David Morris, the co-director of the film) is a successful art dealer who is in a precarious relationship with Lars (Benjamin Hart), a handsome sometime-model. Tom finds excuses for Lars' flings so long as Lars doesn't leave him. Meanwhile Lars has this attraction to Harry and can't get over his feelings
- William (Rocky Marshall) a divorced former rugby player finds it difficult very difficult to parent his nine-year-old daughter Georgie while trying to get on a new relationship with Lawrence (Leon Ockenden), a striving soap actor. Their relationship is complicated as Georgie is intent on sabotaging his relationship.
- Louise (Georgia Zaris), a fag hag, is dating Paul (Jeremy Edwards), but suspects Paul is gay. Paul is slowly but surely getting drawn into the gay scene, despite visibly and verbally protesting every step of the way.

By the end of the film three months later, the characters are still striving to make new paths for themselves. Harry is appealing for Alex, now in a small studio residence to return, but the latter turns him gently down despite having feelings for him. Things are much better between William and Lawrence as Georgie becomes more accepting of their relationship. Things have soured between Lars and William. Devastated Lars catches Harry while the latter has just packed to leave everything behind for his long-planned trip away from his dreaded work. Meanwhile Paul is getting more and more into the gay scene despite putting a brave face that he is still straight.

== Cast ==
- James Lance as Harry
- Luke de Woolfson as Alex
- David Morris as Tom
- Benjamin Hart as Lars
- Rocky Marshall as William
- Leon Ockenden as Lawrence
- Georgia Zaris as Louise
- Jeremy Edwards as Paul
- Jan Waters as Harry's Mother
- Maddie Planer as Georgie, Williams's daughter
- Sheila Kidd as William's mother
- Andrew Dunn as Alex's Father
- Karen Meagher as Alex's Mother
- Rick Warden as Alex's Brother
- Katy Odey as Presenter
- Lucy Jules as Emma
- Sarah Carleton as Waitress
- Dolly Wells as Fizz
- Harry Serjeant as Runner
- Ian Tytler as Charlie
- Jim Cole as Heath
- Archie Kidd as Barnaby
- Heather Bleasdale as Barnaby's Mother
- Yvonne O'Grady as Business Woman
- Max Karie as Marcel
- Kate Russell as The Yellow Team
- Ian Russell as The Yellow Team
- Mark Hayford as The Blue Team
- Diane Morgan as The Blue Team
- Terry Bird as Red Team
- Cheryl Fergison as Red Team
