= Crescent City (film) =

- Theatrical release poster
- Directed by: R. J. Collins
- Written by: Rich Ronat
- Produced by: Robert A. Daly Jr.; Vince Jolivette; David Lipper; Denise Loren; Eduard Osipov
- Starring: Alec Baldwin; Esai Morales; Terrence Howard; Nicky Whelan
- Cinematography: Alex Salahi
- Edited by: Eric Potter
- Music by: Josh Atchley
- Production companies: Beno Films; Filmopoly; Grindstone Entertainment Group; Latigo Films; The Exchange
- Distributed by: Lionsgate
- Release date: August 16, 2024
- Running time: 104 minutes
- Country: United States
- Language: English

Crescent City is a 2024 American crime thriller film written by Rich Ronat, directed by R. J. Collins and starring Alec Baldwin, Esai Morales, Terrence Howard and Nicky Whelan.

== Cast ==
- Alec Baldwin as Captain Howell
- Esai Morales as Luke
- Terrence Howard as Brian Sutter
- Michael Sirow as Pastor Lawson
- Nicky Whelan as Jaclyn
- Anjul Nigam as Gopal Sharma
- Reema Sampat as Elena Sutter
- Rose Lane Sanfilippo as Sabrina Harris
- Nikita Kahn as Marcy McCallum

== Production ==
The film was shot at the Arkansas Department of Commerce. Filming wrapped in Little Rock, Arkansas in September 2023.

== Release ==
The film was released in theaters and On Demand on August 16, 2024.

== Reception ==
The film has a 14% rating on Rotten Tomatoes based on 14 reviews. Jeffrey M. Anderson of Common Sense Media awarded the film two stars out of five. Will Sayre of MovieWeb rated the film 2 out of 5.

Joe Leydon of Variety gave the film a negative review and wrote, "Blockbuster store shelves used to be overburdened to the point of near-collapse with unremarkable trifles such as this."
