= Benjamin Hart =

British actor (born 1977)

- Born: 17 October 1977 (age 48); England
- Occupation: Actor
- Years active: 2006–present
- Movement: Television, Cinema

Benjamin Hart (born 17 October 1977) is an English actor best known for his roles as Foz in the British soap opera Hollyoaks, and as Adam Rhodes in the Australian soap opera Neighbours.

== Biography ==
=== Acting career ===
Hart attended Rodborough Technology College in Godalming, Surrey. He subsequently appeared for eight months as Foz in English soap opera Hollyoaks, and had a role in the WE tv series American Princess.

Hart began a role in Australian soap opera Neighbours in 2007 as Adam Rhodes, a British police officer-turned construction worker. He had a lead role in the LGBT comedy Mr. Right, released in 2009, playing the role of Lars, one of the lead characters.

== Model and scout ==
As a model scout, Hart helped to launch the career of English model and actress Lily Cole. He appeared as a model in videos for Madonna, the Spice Girls and Dannii Minogue, and in TV commercials including an international campaign as the Diet Coke boy, and for Nokia and Eden Springs water.

== Filmography ==
Films

- 2009: Mr. Right as Lars

TV series

- 2006: Hollyoaks as Foz
- 2007: Neighbours as Adam Rhodes (53 episodes)
