= Fletcher O'Leary =

Australian actor

- Born: 10 June 1997 (age 29); Australia
- Occupation: Actor

Fletcher O'Leary (born 10 June 1997) is an Australian actor. He is best known for playing the role of Mickey Gannon in the Australian soap opera Neighbours from 19 June 2007 to 14 July 2009.

== Biography ==
Fletcher O'Leary was born in Victoria, Australia. His mother was a primary school theatre teacher and his father was a financial businessman. O'Leary has one younger brother and one younger sister. He shares a birthday with his brother and his father.

O'Leary attended Warranwood Primary School, where his mother taught, and then Eltham High School. He played football for a local team as well as trained in dance.

O'Leary was cast in the Australian soap opera Neighbours in 2007, where he played Mickey Gannon until 2009. His younger brother Blake originally auditioned for Mickey at the same time, but instead was cast as Ben Kirk.

== Awards and nominations ==
For his role as Mickey, O'Leary was nominated for "Best Child Actor (Under 16)" at the 2008 Digital Spy Soap Awards. The same year also saw O'Leary nominated for "Best Young Actor" at the Inside Soap Awards. In 2009, O'Leary was again nominated for "Best Young Actor" at the Inside Soap Awards.
