= Scott Johnson (actor) =

Australian actor, singer and musician

- Education: National Institute of Dramatic Art (NIDA)
- Occupations: Actor, singer, musician
- Known for: Neighbours (2007) as Terrence Chesterton
- Spouse: Rachel Gordon (m.2005 – div.2009)

Scott Johnson is an Australian actor, singer and musician.

== Early life ==
Johnson studied acting at Australia's National Institute of Dramatic Art (NIDA), graduating with a degree in Performing Arts (Acting) in 1996.

== Career ==
Since graduating from NIDA, Johnson has combined stage acting with various roles in Australian television and films.

He appeared on Blue Heelers in 2005, during the time that his real-life wife, Rachel Gordon had a long-running role as Detective Senior Constable Amy Fox. He then appeared in long-running Australian soap opera Neighbours in 2007, as Terrence Chesterton, an accomplice to villain Charlotte Stone, once again played by Gordon.

Johnson starred for nearly two years as Tommy DeVito in the long-running Australian stage production of Jersey Boys in Melbourne and Sydney. During this period he performed live at the AFL Grand Final, the Australian Open Men's Tennis Final, The Grand Final Footy Show at Rod Laver Arena and on television series Dancing with the Stars.

Johnson is also a singer and a songwriter. He released an EP, "The Tree and the Sea, Part 1" produced by Paul McKercher, and has also released several singles.

He has been a tutor and director at the National Institute of Dramatic Art (NIDA) in Sydney, the Victorian College of the Arts (VCA), and Monash University in Melbourne. He was also the Director and Head of Acting at Showfit from 2014 to 2020.

== Personal life ==
In November 2005, Scott married his partner of 11 years, actress Rachel Gordon. The two met at the National Institute of Dramatic Art (NIDA) in Sydney. They divorced in 2009.

== Filmography ==
=== Film ===
Year	Title	Role	Notes
1987	Comic Cabby	Bill	Feature film
1998	Heaven on the 4th Floor	Nurse	Short film
2007	Road Rage	Angry Driver	Short film
2007	Razzle Dazzle: A Journey into Dance	Vomit Child's Father	Mockumentary film
2021	Alba	Thomas	Short film
2024	The Fall Guy	Director - NYC Film	Feature film

=== Television ===
Year	Title	Role	Notes
1989	E Street	Street Kid	1 episode
1997	Big Sky	Nick	1 episode
2002	McLeod's Daughters	Rowan Simmons	1 episode
2004	Jessica	Phillips	Miniseries
2005	Blue Heelers	Steven Prior	3 episodes
2007	Neighbours	Terrence Chesterton	8 episodes
2010	Offspring	Tim	1 episode
2011	Rescue: Special Ops	Brad Golen	1 episode
2014	Four Quarters	Trent	Miniseries, 10 episodes
2019	Preacher	Abraham	1 episode
2021	Harrow	Reverend Josh Mercado	1 episode
2021	The Newsreader	Stuart Tipple	1 episode
2023	In Our Blood	Constable Barnaby	Miniseries, 1 episode

== Theatre ==
Year	Title	Role	Notes
1984	Murray's Reward		St Andrews Theatre, Deloraine with Deloraine Dramatic Society & Launceston Players
1994	The Touch of Silk	Clifford Osbourne	NIDA Parade Theatre, Sydney
1995	A Month in the Country	Herr Schaaf	NIDA Parade Theatre, Sydney
1995	A Midsummer Night's Dream	Demetrius	NIDA Parade Theatre, Sydney
1996	The Merchant of Venice	Morocco / Old Gobbo / Venice / Stephano	NIDA Parade Theatre, Sydney
1996	The Pajama Game	Sid Sorokin	NIDA Parade Theatre, Sydney
1996	The Bear		NIDA Parade Theatre, Sydney
1997–1998	Third World Blues		Australian tour with STC
1998	The Siege of Frank Sinatra		Ensemble Theatre, Sydney
1999	The Crucible	John Proctor	Wharf Theatre, Sydney with STC
1999	Hansel and Gretel		Wharf Theatre, Sydney with STC / Theatre of Image
1999	Cyrano de Bergerac		Wharf Theatre, Sydney with STC
1999	Amco Riders		Tamarama Rock Surfers, Sydney
2001	Crimes of the Heart		Marian St Theatre, Sydney with Northside Theatre Company
2002–2003	Alone it Stands		IMB Theatre, Wollongong, Sydney Opera House, Theatre Royal Sydney, Playhouse, Canberra with STC & Ross Mollison Productions
2003	Wonderlands		The Butter Factory Theatre, Wodonga, Riverina Playhouse, Wagga Wagga, Stables Theatre, Sydney with Hothouse / Griffin Theatre Company, Sydney
2004	How Like an Angel		Australian regional tour with Railway St Theatre
2006	Go Pinocchio!		Seymour Centre, Sydney & Australian regional tour with Theatre of Image
2007	Who's Afraid of Virginia Woolf?	Nick	QPAC, Brisbane with QTC
2008	The August Moon	Adam	Bille Brown Studio, Brisbane with QTC
2008	Anatomy Titus Fall of Rome: A Shakespeare Commentary	Lucius / Boy	Cremorne Theatre, Brisbane, Malthouse Theatre, Melbourne with QTC & Bell Shakespeare
2009–2011	Jersey Boys	Tommy DeVito	Princess Theatre, Melbourne, Theatre Royal Sydney with Newtheatricals
2016	Little Shop of Horrors	Orin Scrivello	Hayes Theatre Company
2017	Paris: A Rock Odyssey	Hector	Melbourne Recital Centre with Stella Entertainment

== Awards and nominations ==
Year	Work	Award	Category	Result
2003	Wonderlands	Glugs Theatrical Awards	Jeffry Joynton-Smith Memorial Award for Young Performer 'On the Way'	Won
2009	Jersey Boys	Green Room Awards	Best Male Artist in a Leading Role (Music Theatre)	Nominated
2010	Jersey Boys	Helpmann Awards	Best Supporting Actor in a Musical	Nominated
2010	Jersey Boys	Sydney Theatre Awards	Best Performance by an Actor in a Musical or Cabaret	Nominated
2016	Little Shop of Horrors	Sydney Theatre Awards	Best Performance by a Male Actor in a Supporting Role in a Musical	Won
2022	Alba	St Kilda Short Film Festival	Best Actor	Nominated
