= Dan O'Connor (actor) =

Australian actor and singer, known for Australian Idol and Neighbours

Daniel O'Connor
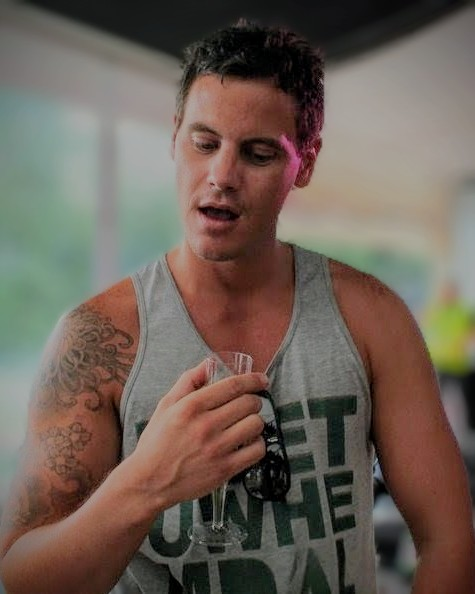
- Born: Sydney, Australia
- Occupations: Actor, singer
- Years active: 2004–present
- Known for: Australian Idol; Neighbours; Hollyoaks

Daniel O'Connor is an Australian television actor and singer, who came to attention in the 2004 season of Australian Idol. He is also known for playing Ned Parker in the Australian soap opera Neighbours and Ally Gorman in the British soap opera Hollyoaks.

== Early life ==
O’Connor grew up as the middle child of his family and attended Hurlstone Agricultural High School. He developed his singing abilities by performing in a worship group while working as a youth worker at Mount Annan Church. Following this, he became a graphic designer.

== Career ==
O'Connor's first appeared on television as a contestant on the second season of Network Ten's singing competition Australian Idol in 2004. He auditioned with the church classic, "I Surrender All" written by Judson W. Van DeVenter. Despite Dicko's dislike of religious songs, he gave O'Connor a "yes", along with Mark Holden and Marcia Hines, sending him into the top 100.

During O'Connor's Top 30 performance, he performed "Amazing" by Josh Kelley and he was subsequently voted into the Final 12. Also put through from his group of ten, were Casey Donovan, Em Rusciano and Ricki-Lee Coulter. After singing the Creed song Higher, he was eliminated second, placing him 11th overall.

O'Connor then appeared in 2005 mobile soap opera, Random Place, in which he played the character of Bo Edwards. The series provided a fly-on-the-wall view of the lives of five twenty-somethings sharing a house near Bondi Beach. This was Australia's first mobile soap opera, based on 2003 Dutch series Jong Zuid. Random Place also starred Olympians Nicole Sanderson and Tatiana Grigorieva, fellow Australian Idol alumnus Marty Worrall, TV presenters Amy Erbacher and Mike Kerry, and actors Jessie Smith, Emily Perry, Kylie Watson and Chris Naismith. Olympic swimmers Libby Lenton, Leisel Jones and Elka Graham made cameo appearances.

In 2005, O'Connor was cast as Ned Parker in the Australian television soap opera Neighbours, after someone from the series contacted his agent expressing interest in him auditioning for the show. O'Connor had not considered acting before and had to audition twice as nerves got the better of him. He moved from rural New South Wales to inner city Melbourne for the role. His character was introduced as the brother of series regular Stuart Parker (Blair McDonough), and he first appeared at Stuart's wedding, before returning to join the permanent cast. He appeared in over 450 episodes. During his time on the show, his character had several relationships, discovered he had a son, and survived a fire and a car crash.

In 2006, O'Connor received a nomination for the Logie Award for Most Popular New Male Talent. In 2007, O'Connor and co-star Natalie Blair (Carmella Cammeniti) were named "King and Queen of Teen" at Dolly magazine's Dolly Teen Choice Awards.

O'Connor had a cameo in Ricki-Lee Coulter's "Can't Touch It" music video in 2007, playing a bartender and her love interest. During his time in Neighbours, he also made guest appearances in Ready Steady Cook, Thank God You're Here and Australia's Brainiest quiz show. From late 2007 until early 2008, O'Connor played the lead in a pantomime production of Jack and the Beanstalk, in the UK.

In February 2008, it was announced that O'Connor would be departing Neighbours later that year, along with co-stars David Hoflin (Oliver Barnes), Jesse Rosenfeld (Marco Silvani) and Sweeney Young (Riley Parker), with O'Connor wanting to revisit his music career and release an album.

O'Connor relocated to the UK in June, where he appeared in reality series CelebAir, and began recording his album. He later appeared in 2010 film The Green Door, portraying the character Greg, before appearing in a 2011 episode of BBC One's Death in Paradise.

In December 2011, it was reported that O'Connor had joined the cast of Hollyoaks as Ally Gorman, an Australian military medic, recently returned from Afghanistan. He originally auditioned twice for a separate role, before being asked to try out for the part of Ally. After securing the role, he began filming his scenes three days later, making his first appearance on 31 January 2012. He initially signed up for an initial twelve episode stint, but his contract was extended, seeing him join the regular cast. He left the show in late 2012, after having appeared in over 75 episodes.

After returning to Australia, O'Connor went on to star as Brody Bennett in Mr & Mrs Murder in 2013, before appearing in three episodes of drama series Winners & Losers in the role of Nate Simpson and an episode of Miss Fisher’s Murder Mysteries.

After this time, O'Connor relocated to Los Angeles, where he began working as a personal trainer, whilst looking for his Hollywood break.

== Acting credits ==
=== Film and television ===
Year	Title	Role	Notes	Ref
2004	Australian Idol	Contestant; Top 12 finalist	Season 2, 6 episodes	
2005	Random Place	Bo Edwards	Mobile phone series	
2005–2008	Neighbours	Ned Parker	Series regular; 450+ episodes	
2008	CelebAir	Contestant	8 episodes	
2010	The Green Door	Greg	Film	
2011	Death in Paradise	Stefan	1 episode	
2011–2012	Hollyoaks	Ally Gorman	Series regular; 76 episodes	
2013	Mr & Mrs Murder	Brody Bennett	1 episode	
2013	Winners & Losers	Nate Simpson	3 episodes	
2013	Miss Fisher’s Murder Mysteries	Vince Barlow	1 episode	

=== Music video ===
Year	Title	Role	Notes	Ref
2007	Ricki-Lee Coulter – "Can't Touch It"	Bartender / Love interest	Music video	

=== Theatre ===
Year	Title	Role	Notes	Ref
2007–2008	Jack and the Beanstalk	Jack Trot	New Theatre, Hull	

== Awards ==
Year	Work	Award	Category	Result	Ref
2006	Neighbours	Logie Awards	Most Popular New Male Talent	Nominated	
2007	Dan O'Connor (with Natalie Blair)	Dolly Teen Choice Awards	King and Queen of Teen	Won	
