= Nikola Dubois =

Australian actress

Nikola Dubois (born 1977) is an Australian actress who appeared on Neighbours.

== Neighbours ==
Dubois appeared as a recurring character on Neighbours. She played the role of Kirsten Gannon in 2007–08. She was nominated in the "Best Bitch" category at the "2008 Inside Soap Awards".

== Other TV appearances ==
- Last Man Standing (2005)
- The Secret Life of Us (2003)
- Blue Heelers unknown episodes
