= Nicky Whelan =

Australian actress and model (born 1981)

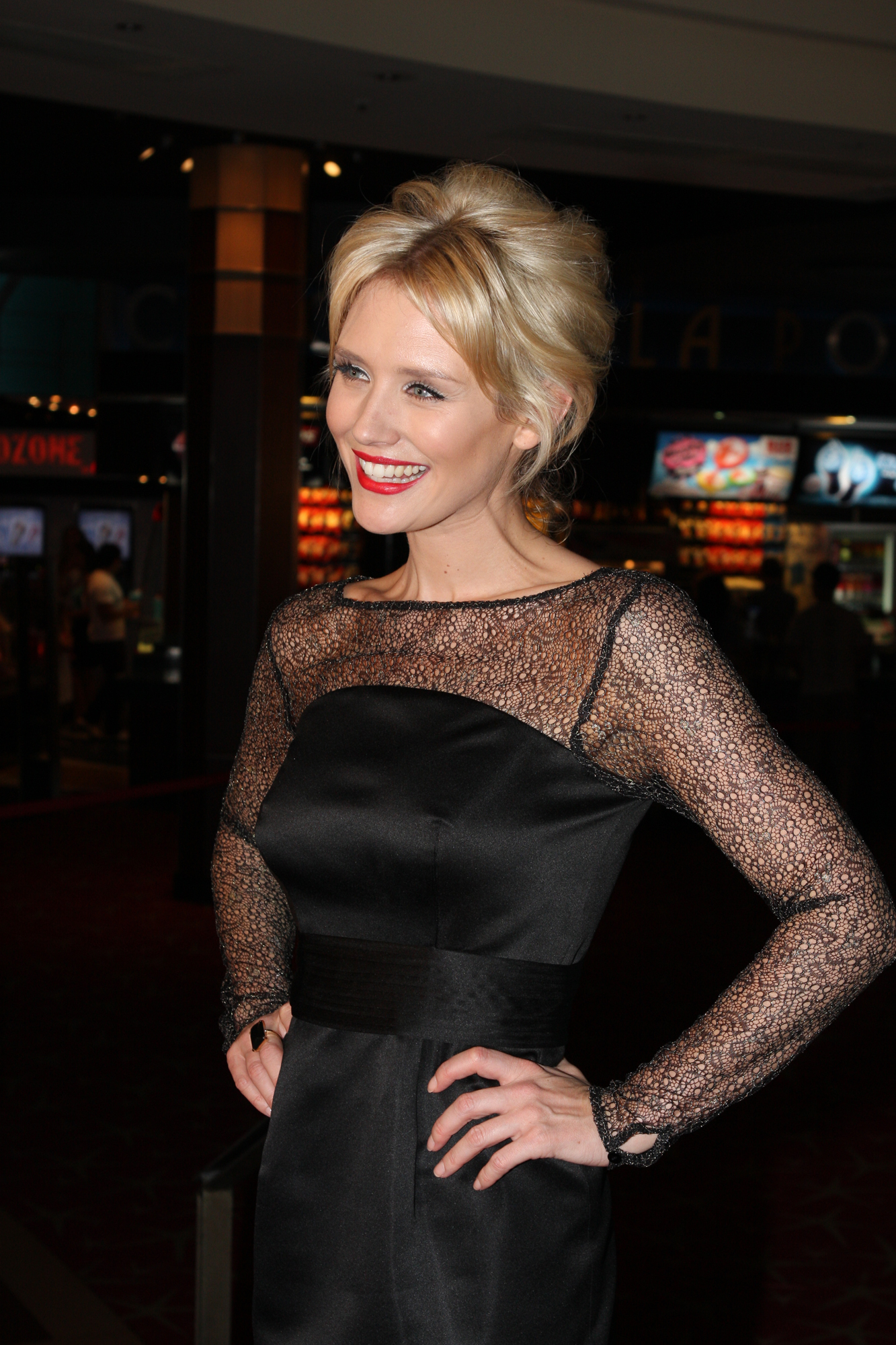
- Whelan in February 2011.
- Born: 10 May 1981 (age 45); Cranbourne, Victoria, Australia
- Other name: Nikki Whelan
- Occupations: Actress, model
- Years active: 1997–present
- Spouse: Kerry Rhodes (m. 2017; div. 2017)

Nicky Whelan (born 10 May 1981) is an Australian actress and model. She is best known for her roles as Laurie Mitchell in Chosen (2013), and Pepper Steiger in Australian soap opera Neighbours (2006–2007).

== Career ==
Before Neighbours, Whelan hosted a number of shows, including Coxy's Big Break (Seven Network), Beyond the Boundary (Network Ten), and Melbourne Woman (Seven Network), and played the fictional celebrity "Chrissie Grant" on Russell Coight's Celebrity Challenge, a spin-off of All Aussie Adventures. Whelan is also known as the face of the rural Victorian city, Shepparton, and she hosted the night racing at Moonee Valley for eight years. Whelan has also posed for a number of Australian magazines, including FHM (in October 2007), Ralph (in November 2005) and Inside Sport. In November 2007, Whelan made a special appearance in Harrow, London, to promote sustainable transport and initiatives that benefit the environment. She also shot some photos for Harrow's 'It's Up to All of Us' campaign.

After leaving Neighbours, Whelan moved to Los Angeles. She made guest appearances in episodes of Entourage and Melrose Place, before securing a role in the ninth season of Scrubs as Maya, an Australian medical-school student. Whelan also stars in the 2010 film Hollywood & Wine alongside David Spade. In November 2010, Whelan appeared in a viral advertisement for Rökk Vodka alongside The Lonely Island. Whelan got her "big break" in the 2011 film Hall Pass, in which she played Leigh, the love interest of Owen Wilson's character. In October 2011, Whelan guest-starred as an attractive telemarketing temp in the episode "Temp-Tress" of the American sitcom Workaholics.

In 2014, Whelan starred in the short-lived action drama series Matador, as well as the apocalyptic thriller film Left Behind as Hattie Durham. The following year, she appeared in comedy film The Wedding Ringer and Terrence Malick's drama film Knight of Cups. In 2017, Whelan appeared in the horror film Tragedy Girls. She also filmed the 2020 mystery drama film Love by Drowning in which she plays the lead.

Whelan starred in betting advertisements on Australian television for BetEasy.

== Personal life ==
Whelan was born in Cranbourne, Victoria, Australia. She is the granddaughter of Marcus Whelan, who played in the Victorian Football League between the 1930s and 1940s.

In 2016, Whelan became engaged to American football player Kerry Rhodes. Whelan and Rhodes were married in Los Angeles on 15 April 2017. In October 2017, Whelan confirmed that she had left Rhodes and the couple had separated. They divorced that same year.

In her spare time, Whelan trains in both boxing and Brazilian Jiu-Jitsu.

== Filmography ==
=== Film ===
| Year | Title | Role | Notes |
|---|---|---|---|
| 2004 | Russell Coight's Celebrity Challenge | Chrissie Grant | TV movie |
| 2007 | Little Deaths | Thorette | |
| 2009 | The Outside | Spring Easten | |
| 2009 | Halloween II | Wendy Snow | |
| 2009 | Dave Knoll Finds His Soul | Girl #2 | Short |
| 2010 | Hollywood and Wine | Jamie Stephens/Diane Blaine | |
| 2011 | Hall Pass | Leigh | |
| 2012 | Coffees | Victoria | Short |
| 2012 | Departure Date | Violet | Short |
| 2013 | The Power of Few | Marti | |
| 2013 | Paranormal Movie | Cindy | |
| 2014 | Flight 7500 | Liz Lewis | |
| 2014 | Left Behind | Hattie Durham | |
| 2014 | Borrowed Moments | Melissa | |
| 2015 | The Wedding Ringer | Nadia | |
| 2015 | Knight of Cups | Nicky | |
| 2016 | Rebirth | Naomi | |
| 2016 | Dog Eat Dog | Daniece | |
| 2017 | Tragedy Girls | Mrs. Kent | |
| 2017 | Inconceivable | Katie | |
| 2017 | Valentine's Again | Kat | TV movie |
| 2017 | Romance at Reindeer Lodge | Molly Clark | TV movie |
| 2017 | Heart | Aunt Grace | Short |
| 2018 | The Middle of X | Emily Prescott | |
| 2018 | A Christmas Arrangement | Poppy Benson | TV movie |
| 2018 | Do Not Be Deceived | Leslie Reynolds | TV movie |
| 2018 | The Danger of Positive Thinking | Lorna | TV movie |
| 2019 | Secrets at the Lake | Amy Pruitt | |
| 2019 | Trauma Center | Madison Taylor | |
| 2020 | InstaFame | Gwen Reynolds | |
| 2020 | The Binge | Pun-Isher | |
| 2020 | Love by Drowning | Lee Anne | |
| 2020 | Dear Christmas | Emma | TV movie |
| 2020 | Famous Adjacent | Nicky | Short |
| 2021 | Last Night in Rozzie | Pattie Barry | |
| 2021 | You're Not Safe Here | Valerie | TV movie |
| 2022 | Maneater | Jessie | |
| 2022 | Dangerous Methods | Sharon Warman | |
| 2023 | The Best Man | Brook | |
| 2023 | The Black Mass | Liz (voice) | |
| 2023 | The Flood | Sheriff Jo Newman | |
| 2023 | The Nana Project | Jennifer | |
| 2024 | Crescent City | Jaclyn Waters | |
| 2024 | 72 Hours | Tessa | |
| 2026 | Bring the Law | Melinda | |
| 2026 | The Dating App Nightmare | Kate | |
| 2026 | On the Hunt | Tammy Fenton | |
| 2026 | A Crime Story | Crystal | |
| 2027 | Zombie Plane | | Post-production |
| TBA | Honeymoon with Harry | | Filming |

=== Television ===
| Year | Title | Role | Notes |
|---|---|---|---|
| 2003 | Pizza | Cheerleader | Episode: "Road Trip Pizza 2" |
| 2006–07 | Neighbours | Heidi "Pepper" Steiger | Regular Cast |
| 2009 | Entourage | Air Hostess | Episode: "Give a Little Bit" |
| 2009 | Melrose Place | Kira | Episode: "Canon" |
| 2009–10 | Scrubs | Maya | Recurring Cast: Season 9 |
| 2010 | Funny or Die Presents | Sandoz Lilly | Episode: "The Carpet Brothers" |
| 2010 | Carpet Bros | Sandoz Lilly | Episode: "Episode #2.1" |
| 2011 | Suite 7 | Girl #2 | Episode: "That Guy" |
| 2011 | Friends with Benefits | Colleen | Episode: "The Benefit of the Mute Button" |
| 2011 | Workaholics | Naomi | Episode: "Temp-Tress" |
| 2012 | NTSF:SD:SUV | Seconds | Episode: "Time Angels" |
| 2013 | Franklin & Bash | Charlie | Recurring Cast: Season 3 |
| 2013 | Chosen | Laura Mitchell | Main Cast: Season 1–2 |
| 2014 | Matador | Annie Mason | Main Cast |
| 2015 | Mr. Robinson | Kelly | Episode: "Love the One You're With" |
| 2015 | Satisfaction | Emma Waverly | Recurring Cast: Season 2 |
| 2015 | The League | L-E | Episode: "The Block" |
| 2016 | Second Chance | Bettina | Episode: "A Suitable Donor" |
| 2016 | House of Lies | Claire | Recurring Cast: Season 5 |
| 2016 | From Dusk till Dawn: The Series | Dr. Dakota Block | Recurring Cast: Season 3 |
| 2018 | Life in Pieces | Kaeli | Episode: "Lingerie Cookbook Gamble Surrogate" |
