= List of Neighbours characters introduced in 2003 =

The following is a list of characters that first appeared in the Network Ten soap opera Neighbours in 2003, by order of first appearance. Ric Pellizzeri took over the role of executive producer from Stanley Walsh, who left the show in November 2002. The 19th season of Neighbours began airing on 20 January 2003 and Pellizzeri's name was added to the credits on 12 May. That same month saw Rhiannon Fish join the cast as Lisa Jeffries. Talent manager Melody Jones arrived in June and Charlie Cassidy followed in July. Oscar Scully, the fifth child of the established Lyn and Joe, was born in August. September saw three introductions; Izzy Hoyland, Detective Alec Skinner and Rocco Cammeniti. Two new members of the Bishop family arrived in October, Liljana and her daughter, Serena. Wendy Stapleton joined the cast as Nina Tucker's mother, Trixie, and Natalie Blair debuted as Carmella Cammeniti. December saw the introduction of Simon Mallory as Chris Cousens.

== Lisa Jeffries ==
Lisa Jeffries
- Neighbours character
- Portrayed by: Rhiannon Fish
- Duration: 2003–2005
- First appearance: 13 May 2003
- Last appearance: 25 March 2005
- Introduced by: Ric Pellizzeri
In-universe information
- Occupation: Student
- Mother: Andrea Jeffries
- Sisters: Sally Jeffries

Lisa Jeffries, played by Rhiannon Fish, made her first on-screen appearance on 13 May 2003. Lisa was Summer Hoyland's (Marisa Siketa) best friend. Lisa was Fish's first screen role and she joined the cast when she was eleven years old. Lisa was initially supposed to be Australian, but after Fish was cast, the writers made her Canadian. Fish said that she loved playing Lisa and that she "got to do lots of awesome things." She described her character as being "selfish and mean" and said that she enjoyed Lisa turning into a "total bitch." Fish said that people may feel sorry for Lisa and that some scenes showed that it was her mother that had made her into a horrible girl.

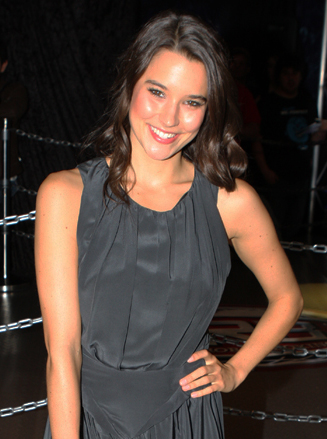
Rhiannon Fish played Lisa from 2003 to 2005

Summer Hoyland makes friends with Lisa at primary school, after they both join the girls' soccer team. They try and persuade Jack Scully (Jay Bunyan) to coach them full-time, but he just teaches them some tricks. Jack later decides to take on the role of assistant coach. Lisa joins Summer's family for a trip to the beach and she and Summer go off to look for treasure and the walk onto a nudist beach. Lisa and Summer later join a pony club. When Summer's father, Max (Stephen Lovatt), splits up with Stephanie Scully (Carla Bonner), Lisa begins picking on Summer. She tells her that Max is too old for Steph and the girls fight. Summer tries to apologise, but Lisa tells her that she is no longer invited to her birthday party. During an orientation day at Erinsborough High, Lisa is paired up with Summer's brother, Boyd (Kyal Marsh), who threatens to flush her head down the toilet if she continues to bully Summer. Lisa then reports him to Susan Kennedy (Jackie Woodburne).

At their next soccer game, Lisa and Summer make up when Summer passes the ball to Lisa and she scores the winning goal. Lisa notices that Max is sad and she tells Summer that it was the same with her mother, when her father left her. Lisa and Summer then decide to get their parents together, so they can be sisters. However, Max and Lisa's mother, Andrea (Gail Beker), have nothing in common. When the girls start at Erinsborough High, they are laughed at for having their socks rolled up and they struggle with the large building. Lisa passes a note around her class about Susan's divorce and even after she is caught, she continues writing more nasty notes. Summer refuses to laugh at the jokes. Summer meets a new boyfriend, Caleb Wilson (Joss Kasper), who gives her expensive gifts. Lisa does not believe that Caleb exists, but she is shocked when he turns up at school to meet Summer for lunch. Lisa is then humiliated when she tries to flirt with Caleb and he rejects her. Lisa begins hanging around with her boyfriend and she encourages Summer to smoke. Summer refuses and Lisa calls her a loser, ending their friendship. Summer starts hanging around with Penny Weinberg (Sally Kingsford) and Lisa steals Penny's diary and reads it out to everyone.

== Melody Jones ==
Melody Jones
- Neighbours character
- Portrayed by: Robyn Arthur
- Duration: 2003–2004, 2006, 2008
- First appearance: 13 June 2003
- Last appearance: 8 May 2008
- Introduced by: Ric Pellizzeri
In-universe information
- Occupation: Talent Manager; Dress Shop Assistant; Publisher

Melody Jones, played by Robyn Arthur, made her first on-screen appearance on 13 June 2003.

Melody is a talent manager whose clients included Robbie D (Khi Robertson) and a boy-band called Roger. Melody approaches Nina Tucker (Delta Goodrem) and asks her to sign with her after seeing her perform at Lou's Place. Nina contacts Melody to arrange a meeting and Melody tells her that she does not need her parents to be involved if she wants to sign up. Melody convinces Lou Carpenter (Tom Oliver) to give Nina a regular singing gig at the pub, so she can showcase her music. Nina agree to sign up, but she has to forge her mother's signature on the forms to keep her out of her work. Melody makes attempts to get Nina into the world of showbiz and she arranges for Nina to go to a movie premiere with Robbie D. Nina tries to pull out because she is dating Jack Scully (Jay Bunyan), but Melody tells her that it could be her big break and she goes. Robbie kisses Nina at the premiere and the moment is captured by a photographer. Melody points out that Nina's profile has been raised and she is taking bookings for interviews and gigs.

After a few months, Melody tells Nina that she has a place on an Asian tour for her with Robbie D. Nina agrees to go, but cannot take Jack with her. Weeks later, Nina is shocked to hear Robbie D singing one of her songs on the radio. She contacts Melody who explains to her that she signed a contract which handed over all of her recording rights. Nina owns up to her mother, Trixie (Wendy Stapleton). Lou points out that the contract is not valid as Nina forged a signature on it.

The following year, Stephanie Scully (Carla Bonner) is looking for a wedding dress and she finds Melody working in a bridal shop. Susan Kennedy (Jackie Woodburne) is surprised and makes a dig about Nina. Melody explains that she had given up managing people because she could not trust anyone. Steph leaves the shop after seeing the prices of the dresses. Melody reinvents herself again as a publisher. Janelle Timmins (Nell Feeney) writes a novel and it gets emailed around the town as part of a joke. Melody sees it and contacts Janelle about publishing the book. Melody meets up with Janelle and tells her that it would need to be longer before it can be published. Only the Timmins family knew that Bree (Sianoa Smit-McPhee) had actually written most of the book. A couple of years later, Melody is back working as a sales assistant in a dress shop. Bridget Parker (Eloise Mignon) and Rachel Kinski (Caitlin Stasey) come in looking for dresses for their school formal. Melody believes that they are going to try everything on without buying anything and the girls leave. Bridget tells her mother and aunt what happened and they take Bridget and Rachel back to the shop. They make several purchases with the help of another assistant who gets the commission instead of Melody.

== Charlie Cassidy ==
Charlie Cassidy
- Neighbours character
- Portrayed by: Cliff Ellen
- Duration: 2003–2005
- First appearance: 23 July 2003
- Last appearance: 25 January 2005
- Introduced by: Ric Pellizzeri
In-universe information
- Occupation: Fisherman
- Sisters: Doreen Cassidy
- Wife: Catherine Cassidy (backstory); Valda Sheergold (2004)
- Sons: Michael Cassidy
- Daughters: Lyn Scully
- Grandsons: Jack Scully; Oscar Scully
- Granddaughters: Stephanie Scully; Felicity Scully; Michelle Scully
- Other relatives: Charlie Hoyland; Adam Fitzgerald

Charlie Cassidy, played by Cliff Ellen, made his first on screen appearance on 23 July 2003. Charlie is the brother of Doreen and father to Michael and Lyn.

Ellen said that he enjoyed playing the role of Charlie. He described his character as being "very much in the mould of Cliff Ellen, but with the odd difference thrown in by the writers for good measure, depth?" On Charlie's controversial death storyline, Ellen said that he had no problem with it, but the process was emotional as his wife died during filming.

In the past, Charlie has a brief relationship with Valda Sheergold (Joan Sydney) and she falls pregnant. He then starts seeing another girl, Catherine, and Valda's brother-in-law, Henry O'Rourke (Bud Tingwell), blackmails Charlie into leaving Shelley Bay. Henry and his wife, Connie (Val Jellay) adopt Valda's baby, so she is not a single mother. Valda leaves for England and Charlie and Catherine marry and have a son, Michael (David Paterson). Catherine later dies and Charlie goes back to Shelley Bay and sets up a fishing business.

Years later, Lyn Scully (Janet Andrewartha) learns that Valda and Charlie are her biological parents and she finds Charlie. They arrange to meet, but Charlie becomes ill and is admitted to hospital. Lyn visits him and she learns the truth about Henry adopting her, she finds it hard to forgive Charlie, but she softens when she learns that he is dying. Months later, Charlie comes to visit his grandson, Oscar Scully and he invites Henry down, so they and Lyn can talk. The following year, Charlie returns to see his granddaughter, Stephanie (Carla Bonner), marry Max Hoyland (Stephen Lovatt).

Charlie makes peace with Valda by giving her a pair of pearl earrings and telling her how much she had always meant to him. On the wedding day, Steph and Max elope and Charlie suddenly proposes to Valda. He tells her that he wants to make up for everything that happened between them and so they marry. During their honeymoon, Charlie and Valda meet up with his sister, Doreen (Anne Phelan). Valda is diagnosed with deep vein thrombosis and has to have bed rest. Charlie realises that he wants to spend his last Christmas with Lyn and Doreen agrees to come with him. Charlie tries to keep the truth about his condition from Lyn, but she sees him having a coughing fit. Charlie is taken to the hospital, but he tells his family that he wants to die at Lyn's home. Charlie's last wish is to go on his boat, Sheergold Scandal. Steph and Doreen take him to the boat, but Charlie becomes too ill before they can get on board. The Scullys bring the boat to Ramsay Street on a trailer and Charlie spends Boxing Day on it. Charlie writes a letter to Valda and while he is chatting to Steph, he tells her that he is ready and he dies. Charlie appears to Steph as vision in a dream when she is to stand trial for allegedly killing him. He tells Steph things will work out as they are meant to.

== Oscar Scully ==
Oscar Scully
- Neighbours character
- Portrayed by: Ingo Dammer-Smith; Sheldon Wynne (dream, 2006)
- Duration: 2003–2006
- First appearance: 20 August 2003
- Last appearance: 12 December 2006
- Introduced by: Ric Pellizzeri
In-universe information
- Occupation: Student
- Father: Joe Scully
- Mother: Lyn Scully
- Brothers: Jack Scully
- Sisters: Stephanie Scully; Felicity Scully; Michelle Scully
- Grandfathers: Pat Scully; Charlie Cassidy; Henry O'Rourke
- Grandmothers: Connie O'Rourke; Valda Sheergold
- Uncles: Mick Scully; Tom Scully
- Aunts: Marnie O'Rourke
- Nephews: Charlie Hoyland; Adam Fitzgerald

Oscar Scully, played by Ingo Dammer-Smith, is Lyn and Joe Scully's fifth and youngest child. He was born on-screen on 20 August 2003. Dammer-Smith joined the show when he was a couple of weeks old, he is the son of one of the technical crew.

Lyn (Janet Andrewartha) and Joe Scully (Shane Connor) decide to try for another baby and almost give up hope, when Lyn suddenly announces she is pregnant at Susan (Jackie Woodburne) and Karl Kennedy's (Alan Fletcher)'s wedding reception. Lyn does not have an easy pregnancy, as she is injured during a robbery at the Kennedy house and then learns that her aunt, Valda (Joan Sydney), is actually her mother. Joe and Lyn decide to go away for a few days when Lyn passes her due date and there is no sign of the baby. Lyn has terrible stomach pains and Joe rushes her home. Lyn is told that the baby is in a breach position and she would need a caesarean section to deliver it. Lyn does not like this and goes home to try exercises to turn the baby, which is successful. Lyn goes into labour and Oscar is delivered by Dr. Veronica Olenski (Caroline Lloyd). Both Lyn and Joe are surprised that Oscar is a boy, as Karl had told them he was a girl.

Joe is happy to have another son, but Lyn finds it difficult to bond with Oscar. Lyn does not comfort Oscar when he cries and she tells him that she does not know why she does not love him properly. Oscar was baptised and Susan, Valda, Harold Bishop (Ian Smith) and Gino Esposito (Shane McNamara) are his godparents. Harold and Gino compete to be the better godfather. Lyn leaves Oscar in the car while she goes shopping and she is arrested for shoplifting. Karl diagnoses her with post-natal depression. Joe makes Oscar a promise that he will love him enough for both of them until Lyn gets better. Lyn begins to bond well with Oscar and is happy when she realises that he likes The Bold and the Beautiful. Joe tries to wean Oscar off the soap, but he does not succeed. Joe leaves the family to look after his father and brother in Bendigo and his marriage to Lyn breaks down. Oscar gets to visit Joe and he has his older siblings, Jack (Jay Bunyan) and Steph (Carla Bonner) around. When Steph becomes pregnant and suffers from breast cancer, she takes Oscar and disappears. She later admits that she was just keeping him safe. Elle Robinson (Pippa Black) babysits Oscar, but he wanders off by Lassiter's lake and loses his in the water. Ned Parker (Daniel O'Connor) rescues Oscar and becomes his nanny. Following her failed marriage to Paul Robinson (Stefan Dennis), Lyn decides to take Oscar to live in Shelly Bay. She returns to Ramsay Street a few years later without him and she reveals that Oscar is with his father in Bendigo. She goes to visit him, but he does not want to return home with her.

== Izzy Hoyland ==
Isabelle "Izzy" Hoyland, played by Natalie Bassingthwaighte, made her first on-screen appearance on 1 September 2003. Izzy is the daughter of Rosie Hoyland (Maggie Millar) and sister to Max Hoyland (Stephen Lovatt). Holy Soap described Izzy as "conniving", while the Herald Sun said she is "Ramsay St's resident bad girl" and a "trouble-making schemer." Bassingthwaighte said that it is fun playing Izzy and that being bad is "exciting."

== Alec Skinner ==
Alec Skinner
- Neighbours character
- Portrayed by: Kevin Summers
- Duration: 2003, 2005–2010
- First appearance: 9 September 2003
- Last appearance: 17 March 2010
- Introduced by: Ric Pellizzeri (2003); Susan Bower (2008)
In-universe information
- Occupation: Police Detective
- Wife: Trish Skinner

Alec Skinner, played by Kevin Summers, is a Police Detective. He made his first on-screen appearance on 9 September 2003.

Lyn Scully (Janet Andrewartha) leaves her son, Oscar, in the car at a supermarket and a passer-by calls the police. Alec brings Oscar to Lyn and her husband, Joe (Shane Connor), and he explains that the car was in a different car park and that Lyn committed a serious offence. However, Alec says that no further action will be taken. Lyn later takes something from a shop without paying. Alec takes her to the station and she tells him that she did not realise that she had the item. When Oscar starts crying, Alec tells Lyn that he may need feeding or changing, but she snaps at him and he becomes concerned. Lyn tells him that she does not love Oscar and Alec calls Karl Kennedy (Alan Fletcher) as he believes Lyn is suffering from postnatal depression. He explains that his wife went through the same thing. Alec investigates Charlie Cassidy's (Cliff Ellen) death when a high level of painkillers are found in his system and some pillow fibres are also found. He asks Stephanie Scully (Carla Bonner) why she moved Charlie's pillow after he died and after questioning the rest of the family, he tells her to get a lawyer.

Alec later questions her at the police station. Alec also investigates the murder of Gus Cleary (Ben Barrack). He questions Karl and he and his colleague Joanna Douglas (Matilda White) question Boyd Hoyland (Kyal Marsh) and Sky Mangel (Stephanie McIntosh). Alec tells Boyd that he was seen threatening Gus and when Boyd lies that he and Sky were watching a movie the night Gus was killed, Alec proves that he was not. Alec next investigates David Bishop (Kevin Harrington) for fraud. He and his officers take David's computer for evidence, when they discover that there are irregularities with the Helen Daniels Trust. When Alec's wife, Trish, becomes seriously ill, Alec tries to make sure she receives the best care. Paul Robinson (Stefan Dennis) offers Alec money in exchange for information about the identity of a Lassiter's share holder. Alec accepts, but when Paul tries to bribe him into setting up Janelle Timmins (Nell Feeney), Alec breaks off the deal. Alec goes to see Boyd after he is involved in an accident with Charlotte Stone (Rachel Gordon). Charlotte tells Alec that Boyd kidnapped her and made threats. She also tells him that Boyd was involved in Terrence Chesterton's (Scott Johnson) murder. Boyd, however, tells Alec that Charlotte murdered Terence and that he has a confession on an MP3 player. Alec and his team do not find the MP3 player and he charges Boyd with kidnapping and fraud. Steph finds the MP3 player and Alec arrests Charlotte for murder.

A year later, Alec investigates the murder of Chris Knight (Luke Mitchell). He talks to Bridget Parker (Eloise Mignon) about what happened when she was alone with him and she tells him that she pushed Chris over. Bridget's father, Steve Parker (Steve Bastoni), then confesses to hitting Chris. Alec questions Steve and charges him with murder. When Matt Freedman (Benjamin Mitchell) tries to cover up a hit and run caused by his daughter, Alec arrests him after she confesses and he look at witness statements. The following year, Alec becomes involved with Jill Ramsay's (Perri Cummings) death and the subsequent investigation into Paul Robinson, when he goes on the run. Animal activist Mia Zannis (Alicia Bonnadio) strikes a deal with Alec, whereby she will give him the ring leader of her animal activist group and he will drop any charges against her. Mia tells Alec that Zeke Kinski (Matthew Werkmeister) is the ringleader and he gives her a week to prove it. Mia plants computer files containing plans of a house owned by an animal testing facility's CEO on to Zeke's laptop and she takes him to the house. Alec catches Zeke about to climb through a window and arrests him and Mia. Alec does not find any evidence on Zeke, as he knew about it in advance. He then tells Alec that Mia is the ringleader and he is willing to testify against her.

== Rocco Cammeniti ==
Rocco Cammeniti
- Neighbours character
- Portrayed by: Robert Forza
- Duration: 2003–2004, 2007
- First appearance: 19 September 2003
- Last appearance: 23 July 2007
- Introduced by: Ric Pellizzeri
In-universe information
- Occupation: Businessman
- Brothers: Raimondo Cammeniti
- Sisters: Maria Cammeniti
- Wife: Lucia Cammeniti
- Daughters: Rosetta Cammeniti; Rosaria Cammeniti; Carmella Cammeniti
- Grandsons: Marco Yeats
- Granddaughters: Chloe Cammeniti
- Aunts: Angelica Cammeniti; Sofia Cammeniti
- Nieces: Teresa Cammeniti; Sienna Cammeniti

Rocco Cammeniti, played by Robert Forza, made his first screen appearance on 19 September 2003. Rocco is a businessman and the father of Rosetta (Natalie Saleeba) and Carmella Cammeniti. (Natalie Blair) TV Week called Rocco a "scary underworld figure." While Doug Anderson of The Sydney Morning Herald branded him a "preposterous sub-Soprano gangster".

In March 2004, it was revealed that Rocco is having an affair with Sindi Watts (Marisa Warrington). Sindi calls him "Tiny" and does not tell her friends his real name. She later decides to end the relationship and she meets up with Rocco, but he tells her that he does not want her let her go. When Sindi tries again, Rocco tells her that he has left his wife and gives her an engagement ring. At first, Sindi cannot bring herself to tell him that she is in love with someone else, but she manages to end their affair. Rocco is hurt and he decides to have her followed to see why she left him. He is "enraged" when he sees photos of Sindi with Toadfish Rebecchi (Ryan Moloney). Warrington said "It's an understatement to say that Rocco is not happy about Sindi and Toadie. He goes a bit crazy. He thinks Sindi is his whether Sindi wants to be or not!"

Sam Soap and Lucy Lather from Inside Soap criticised Rocco for being a lame gangster. Lather believed that Rocco feeling remorse for kidnapping Toadie was a characterisation mistake. She added "if he'd been any kind of baddie, Toadie would be in Lassiter's lake by now." Soap believed that Rocco followed a trend of non-sinister gangsters adding, "soap's hard men have gone soppy around the edges these days." He concluded that such gangster storylines are "laughable".

Lou Carpenter (Tom Oliver) buys a coffee machine for his pub and he sends Toadfish Rebecchi and Connor O'Neill (Patrick Harvey) to collect it. Toadie and Connor meet Rocco and they become convinced that they had found the Erinsborough Mafia. When the machine does not work properly, Rocco gives Lou a lesson in using it. Months later, Rocco asks Lou to employ his daughter, Carmella (Natalie Blair). Rocco notices Connor looking at his daughter and he threatens him. However, he begins to suspect that Carmella is dating Connor and makes plans to stop it immediately. Rocco runs into Connor and lies to him that he is going to leave for Sicily. The next day, he finds Carmella and Connor together in his sauna and sends Carmella away. Lou calls Rocco when he is having some financial problems and Rocco agrees to lend him some money. Rocco makes it clear that the loan is only short term and that he wants the repayments soon. Rocco begins finds a new mistress in Sindi Watts and he enjoys spoiling and looking after her. He realises that he has strong feelings for her when she tries to call the relationship off. He refuses to give up on her and proposes. Sindi has no choice, but to accept. However, Sindi later admits that she is not in love with Rocco and cannot go through with marrying him.

Rocco gets Lou's car as part payment for his loan and he sends a henchmen to find why Sindi broke up with him. Rocco is furious to see photos of Sindi kissing Toadie and he asks Toadie to join him viewing a potential home. Toadie disappears and Sindi and Stuart Parker (Blair McDonough) know that Rocco has played a part in it. Stuart tries to prove that Rocco is guilty, but cannot find any evidence. Rocco spends his time visiting Toadie, who is actually in a coma in a country hospital. It is revealed that while Rocco's henchman was transporting Toadie to Adelaide to give him a fright, they were involved in an accident, which left Toadie badly injured. Rocco becomes upset and he is comforted by Libby Kennedy (Kym Valentine), who is on her way home to Erinsborough. Libby later tells Sindi and Stuart where she met Rocco. They drive to the hospital and find Rocco leaning over Toadie. Rocco tries to run, but Stuart catches him and he is arrested for his crimes. Three years later, Carmella and her sister, Rosetta (Natalie Saleeba) receive a letter from their father, who claims to be dying. They go to visit him in prison and discover that Rocco was lying. He tells them that he is having trouble with his brother, Raimondo (Jeff Kovski), who is trying to destroy one of the family businesses. He asks the girls to dig up some money, which is buried in a local park, and save the business. Carmella gets the money and rescues the business. Rocco asks Rosetta and her fiancé Frazer Yeats (Ben Lawson) to visit him and after he gives them his blessing, he asks to attend the wedding. A few weeks later, Rocco arrives at the church with a police escort to watch Rosetta marry.

== Liljana Bishop ==
Liljana Bishop, played by Marcella Russo, made her first on-screen appearance on 9 October 2003. Liljana is the wife of David Bishop (Kevin Harrington) and mother to Serena (Lara Sacher) and Luka Dokich(Keelan O'Hehir). Liljana is the first Serbian to reside in Ramsay Street.

== Serena Bishop ==
Serena Bishop, played by Lara Sacher, made her first on-screen appearance on 9 October 2003 with her family. Serena is the daughter of David (Kevin Harrington) and Liljana Bishop (Marcella Russo). Sacher was sixteen when she was cast in the role of Serena. The part was her first professional acting job.

== Trixie Tucker ==
Trixie Tucker
- Neighbours character
- Portrayed by: Wendy Stapleton
- Duration: 2003–2004, 2016
- First appearance: 20 October 2003
- Last appearance: 25 November 2016
- Introduced by: Ric Pellizzeri (2003); Jason Herbison (2016)
In-universe information
- Occupation: Singer
- Husband: Lou Carpenter (2003–2004)
- Daughters: Nina Tucker

Trixie Tucker, played by Wendy Stapleton, made her first appearance on 20 October 2003. Stapleton's casting details were announced in June 2003, and she began filming that same month. Stapleton admitted to being "blown away" when she received the part, and said she was having "a really good time" filming. Trixie was introduced as Nina Tucker's (Delta Goodrem) mother and a love interest for Lou Carpenter (Tom Oliver).

Of her character's backstory, Stapleton said "Nina's mum is a singer who has been away a lot on tour with Nina's dad – they're a showbiz couple." Trixie arrives in Erinsborough after her double act partner and Nina's father, Nick, ends their relationship. Stapleton said that Nick leaves Trixie for a younger woman from a musical they are appearing in, so she decides to come home and spend some time with her daughter. She told Jason Herbison of Inside Soap: "It's a blow to Trixie's ego and it leaves her vulnerable. Her act is in ruins. She puts on a front, but underneath it all she is completely shattered." Lou Carpenter offers Trixie a solo gig at his pub as he likes her, but she cannot perform in public without Nick, so Nina helps out. Stapleton said that the performance enables Trixie to regain some confidence and she and Nina win the audience over. Stapleton also explained that Nina's relationship with her mother was complicated and there were issues between them. Stapleton and Goodrem did not get much of a chance to explore their characters' relationship, as Goodrem was diagnosed with Hodgkin's lymphoma three weeks into the storyline. The scripts were changed so Nina was not as involved. Stapleton said, "You'll see scenes where we pretend she is upstairs until we got the chance to sort it out properly." Trixie eventually goes on to marry Lou.

Stapleton reprised the role in 2016 for a brief guest stint. Trixie meets an unsuspecting Lou for a date. Daniel Kilkelly of Digital Spy commented, "If we're honest, they don't seem to be making too much of an effort as they're only catching up in the café, but Trixie is still more than happy to see if there's still a spark between them." The character returned on 25 November 2016. Reporters for the Herald Sun believed Trixie Tucker "sounds a little too much like a porn star name for us." The BBC said Trixie's most notable moment was "Walking out on Lou when her show Hello Dolly was a flop."

Trixie is a singer and performer who spent most of her life touring the world with her partner, Nick and their daughter Nina. When Nina's schooling begins to suffer the family spend more time in Erinsborough. Trixie and Nick's relationship ends when he has an affair. Trixie tries to keep her problems from Nina, but when she attends one of her mother's shows, she sees that Trixie has no confidence. Lou Carpenter sees Trixie, and as he was a fan and had a crush on her, he offers her a regular gig performing in his pub. She accepts, but her first performance is almost a disaster, when she forgets notes and lyrics. Nina joins her mother on stage and rescues the show. Lou and Trixie begin spending more time together and when Trixie tells him that she cannot live with Nick anymore, Lou offers to rent Number 22 to her and Nina. Trixie cooks Lou a meal to say thanks and they kiss. When Trixie finds out that Nina has signed a contract with Melody Jones (Robyn Arthur) and forged her signature, she is furious. Lou eventually helps Nina get out of the contract.

Trixie makes it clear that she and Nick are over and she kisses Lou again. Trixie tells him that she and Nick were not legally married and they can go public with their relationship. Lou encourages Trixie to tell Nina that she is an illegitimate child and when she does, Nina refuses to speak to her mother for a while. Trixie then proposes to Lou, who accepts. Trixie gets an offer of the lead in a touring production of Hello Dolly and she asks Lou to invest money in it. On Boxing Day, Lou and Trixie have a showbiz wedding at Her Majesty's Theatre. Valda Sheergold (Joan Sydney) objects to the wedding and calls Trixie a gold-digger, but she and Lou marry. At the reception, Harold Bishop (Ian Smith) has a stroke and Trixie makes it clear that Harold has ruined her day. Lou cancels their honeymoon to look after Harold and Trixie decides to throw herself into being a housewife. Lou remortgages all of his properties and businesses to raise money to fund the Hello Dolly tour. Trixie is excited and she and Lou hold a press conference to announce the tour and their departure for three months. In Hong Kong, Trixie is shocked when the opening night of the musical is cancelled due to low ticket sales. As Lou is stuck in their hotel due to flu, Trixie lies to him that she performed that night. The next day, she discovers that the entire run of the show had been cancelled. Lou finds out that Trixie lied to him and he decides to go home, as they have no money. Trixie gets a gig in a themed club, but Lou tells her to go back to Erinsborough. Trixie feels that she has failed Lou and she slips away during the night. Months later, she joins Nick and Nina in India.

Twelve years later, Lou asks to meet Trixie in Erinsborough to talk. Trixie insists that she was going to pay Lou back and that she regrets the way she left him. Lou wonders if they there is a chance they could give their relationship another chance. They go to The Waterhole, where Trixie notices Sheila Canning (Colette Mann) watching them and she confronts her. Sheila tells Trixie that Lou is on the rebound from his former wife and Trixie leaves.

== Carmella Cammeniti ==
Carmella Cammeniti, played by Natalie Blair, made her first on-screen appearance on 26 November 2003. The character of Carmella was created by the writers, following Delta Goodrem's sudden departure due to illness. Three months worth of scripts were rewritten and Carmella was introduced to fill the void left by Goodrem's character, Nina Tucker. Carmella is the youngest daughter of Rocco and Lucia Cammeniti.

== Chris Cousens ==
Chris Cousens
- Neighbours character
- Portrayed by: Simon Mallory
- Duration: 2003–2005
- First appearance: 2 December 2003
- Last appearance: 5 May 2005
- Introduced by: Ric Pellizzeri
In-universe information
- Occupation: Photographer

Chris Cousens, played by Simon Mallory, made his first on-screen appearance on 2 December 2003. Chris is a "sleazy" photographer who uses his profession to take advantage of vulnerable girls, like Serena Bishop (Lara Sacher). Chris returned in 2005 and spiked the drink of Janae Timmins (Eliza Taylor).

TV Week said that Chris "wreaked havoc on Serena's life" when he first appeared. they described him as an "Erinsborough bad guy." Chris returns in 2005 and meets Janae Timmins (Eliza Taylor-Cotter) at a nightclub. Her boyfriend has left her alone and she gets talking to Chris, who tells her that she should be a model. He buys Janae a drink and when she collapses, she realises that it was spiked.

Serena Bishop sneaks out to a nightclub to see Taj Coppin (Jaime Robbie Reyne) and she is approached by Chris, who asks her to model for him. When Serena discovers that her parents are having financial problems, she decides to take up Chris' offer to earn them some money. She and Sky Mangel (Stephanie McIntosh) go to Chris's studio and he gives her a lot of attention. Sky thinks that Chris is looking for more than just a model, but Serena enjoys his attention. She goes back to the studio alone and Chris touches her to change her position and offers her a dress for her school formal. Chris gains her trust and he asks Serena if she would join him at a hotel. Serena agrees, but at the hotel she begins to feel uncomfortable. Chris offers her drinks, but she decides to leave. Chris chases her, but Serena gets into a taxi. He sends her flowers to apologise. Serena models for Chris again in a swimsuit. Serena's parents, Liljana (Marcella Russo) and David (Kevin Harrington), find the photos and refuse to let Serena see Chris. When he comes into the Coffee Shop, Liljana slaps him. Serena claims that she loves Chris and continues seeing him in secret. On her birthday, Serena goes to see him and he begins to get heavy with her and she becomes uncomfortable. When he leaves the room, Serena notices a webcam and leaves. She tells her parents and they call the police. David breaks into Chris' studio and takes his hard drive. Serena later meets Lana Crawford (Bridget Neval) who tells her that she too met Chris and had been taken in by him.

The following year, Janae Timmins goes to a nightclub with her boyfriend. When he tries to get her to kiss someone else, she storms off and walks into Chris. He asks is she is a model and Janae laughs, but he mentions that he is a photographer and she agrees to have a drink with him. He gets the drinks and spikes Janae's. She starts losing control of her body and Chris offers to take her home and goes to get their coats. Janae calls home and her siblings, Stingray (Ben Nicholas), Dylan (Damien Bodie) and Bree (Sianoa Smit-McPhee), arrive at the club. As Chris tries to get Janae out of the club, Dylan sees him and refuses to believe that he is just giving her a hand. Bree knees Chris in the groin and Dylan takes him outside to beat him up. Janae later reports him to the police.

== Others ==
Date(s)	Character	Actor	Circumstances
21 January	Edward Clohesy	Terry Brittingham	When Daniel Clohesy admits his father is hitting him and wants to stay with the Hoylands, Max takes him home to collect his things. Edward confronts them and he is not happy. He admits that he has lost his job and his wife has left him. Edward tells Max that he understands that Daniel wants to get away from him for a while and he agrees to seek counselling.
29 January–21 February	Joanne Blair	Nell Feeney	Joanne is friends with Stephanie Scully. Joanne meets Max Hoyland and they have more in common than Max and Steph, so Joanne becomes determined to win Max. Joanne uses her son to get close to Max. Max eventually makes it clear that he only wants to be friends with Joanne, after his daughter, Summer becomes unhappy.
21 February–15 April	Alex Argenzio	Marco Pio Venturini	Alex works at Lou's Place and he is asked out by Stephanie Scully. Alex takes her swimming with sharks for their first date. Steph introduces Alex to her parents and they like him. Alex leaves for a trip around Australia and Steph joins him, but only as a friend because she has feelings for Max Hoyland. After a canoeing accident, Steph returns home and Alex continues his journey.
25 February 2003–6 July 2004	Jim Baynes	David Cormick	Jim works for Joe Scully's building company and resents Connor O'Neill being left in charge. He and the other workers disrespect him. When Connor begins to assert his authority, Jim calls immigration on him. Jim and the other workers also begin picking on Joe's son, Jack when Joe leaves him in charge.
28 February–8 September	Candace Barkham	Kate Whitbread	Candace becomes Principal of Erinsborough High replacing Susan Kennedy. Candace clashes with Susan numerous times. Karl Kennedy attends alcoholics anonymous meetings and meets Candace, who is researching alcoholics from school. Karl invites Candace to dinner and Candace says she is willing to try to get on with Susan. Candace begins a feud with Lori Lee and Taj Coppin takes an embarrassing picture of her and posts it all over the school. Candace visits Libby Kennedy after she quits her job and she tells her that she had also had an affair with a student. Candace encourages Libby to take a teaching job in Adelaide.
11 March	Darren Turner	Daniel Fletcher	Darren is Dee Bliss' ex-husband. Darcy Tyler invites him to a ball in Erinsborough as part of his plan to split Dee and Toadfish Rebecchi up. Dee is shocked to see Darren and leaves, but Toadie talks to him. Dee returns and Darren asks her what she is up to now. Darcy forces Darren to mention that he and Dee were married, which surprises Toadie.
26 March–25 April	Jacinta Martin	Eliza Taylor-Cotter	A local girl who begins bullying Summer Hoyland when she starts her paper round. Summer, scared has her brother Boyd cover for her for a while but Jacinta returns and continues threatening her. Heather Green comes to Summer's aid, and reveals she knows Jacinta and knows how to handle her. When Jacinta begins picking on Summer again, Heather threatens to tell everyone that she has Ringworm, prompting Jacinta to make a sharp exit.
22 April–27 May	James Atkinson	Jeff Keogh	Darcy Tyler becomes involved with James when he begins gambling. Darcy gets into debt with James and gives him a cheque, which bounces. Darcy tells James that he will get the money and he steals from Lou's Place and takes out a loan, but it is not enough. James blackmails Darcy and Darcy steals some jewellery from Susan and Karl Kennedy to pay the debt.
6–12 May	Nancy Bliss	Joy Westmore	Nancy is Dee Bliss's grandmother. Dee looks after her when she is ill. Dee returns the following year to visit Nancy, after she has problems with her love life. Darcy Tyler comes to see Dee and Nancy approves of him. Darcy stays for a few days and when Toadfish Rebecchi comes looking for Dee, Nancy tells him that Dee is out with her new boyfriend.
6 June–15 August	Kat Riley	Gemma Bishop	Stuart Parker finds a horse and he keeps it in his garden, but it runs away. He finds it again, but Kat accuses him of stealing it. Stuart explains the situation and Kat is annoyed that he did not phone the stables. They go for a drink and Kat tells him that she went to Melbourne university to be a vet, but dropped out. Kat and Stuart go on a few dates, but Stuart breaks up with her. Months later, Kat gives riding lessons to Summer Hoyland and tries to get back with Stuart, but he turns her down.
19 June–25 July	Cameron Hodder	Stephen Phillips	Cameron is interviewed by Karl Kennedy who is looking for a replacement partner in his medical practice following the arrest of his nephew Darcy Tyler and he is successful. Cameron insults Karl's daughter Libby when he bumps into her. However, they see past this and become friends and form a relationship. This is short-lived as Cameron reveals has no desire to be a father to his own child or accept Libby's son, Ben. Karl fires Cameron and he retaliates by taking out an unfair dismissal suit against Karl. The case breaks down when Cameron loses his temper during the mediation meeting and the judge rules in Karl's favour. Cameron only receives the wages he is entitled to but no compensation.
2 July	Sue Stocks	Ngaire Fair	Sue works at the local pool, teaching people how to swim. Taj Coppin asks for her advice ahead of his first class.
15 August–26 September	Edwina Valdez	Lucia Smyrk	Edwina meets Jack Scully after a gig and she begins sending him suggestive emails. She later turns up at his soccer game on the opposing team. Edwina meets Jack's girlfriend, Nina and she later has sex with him. Jack tries to ignore her afterwards and she starts dating Taj Coppin. When Nina leaves for a trip, Jack meets up with Edwina for sex and he lies about falling in love with her. Edwina slaps him and leaves. She confesses everything to Taj, who forgives her. They later split and Jack apologises for treating her badly.
29 August 2003–22 March 2007	Roberta Marley	Anna McCrossin-Owen	Roberta is an Oncologist at Erinsborough Hospital. She treats Stephanie Scully when she discovers that she has cancer. Roberta tutors medical student Boyd Hoyland at university. She teaches a class about Anatomy and Boyd has to leave the room. Roberta explains that it is a normal reaction. A year later, Roberta treats Sky Mangel's daughter, Kerry, when she is found to be suffering from leukaemia. Roberta tells Sky that Kerry needs bone marrow. Roberta finds that Stingray Timmins is a match and performs the operation.
3 September 2003–2 July 2008	Father Capetola	Mark Doggett	Father Capetola is a Catholic priest, who conducts Oscar Scully's baptism and Charlie Cassidy's funeral. A couple of years later, he marries Stuart Parker and Sindi Watts and Susan Smith and Alex Kinski. Lyn Scully asks Father Capetola to talk to her daughter about getting her grandson baptised. He later refuses to marry her and Paul Robinson as they are both divorced. The following year, he marries Rosetta Cammeniti and Frazer Yeats and later, Carmella Cammeniti and Marco Silvani.
18 September 2003–17 February 2004	Erin Perry	Talia Zucker	Erin begins picking on Sky Mangel and taunting her for her alternative look, branding her a freak. She puts Sky's nose further out of joint when she befriends her cousin, Serena Bishop and tips over a portable toilet while Sky is in it. Sky later takes revenge on Erin, which triggers an asthma attack. The two girls then call a truce after Sky apologises.
29 September 2003–6 April 2004	Andrea Jeffries	Gail Beker	Andrea is Lisa and Sally Jeffries' mother. Lisa and her friend, Summer, try to set Andrea up with Max Hoyland, but they have nothing in common. Andrea and Max insult each other about their children's upbringing. Andrea is not happy when Gus Cleary bullies a child at Sally's party and tells him that he should not be allowed around children.
29 September 2003–4 October 2005	Jonathan Verne	Oscar Redding	Jonathan meets Stuart Parker and tells him about his organisation, Life Mechanics. Stuart begins attending meetings and Jonathan asks him for money. Jonathan asks Stuart to take over one of the local meetings. Stuart later discovers that Life Mechanics is a scam and Jonathan has been conning people. Two years later, Alex Kinski meets Jonathan for alternative treatments to help his lymphoma. Jonathan asks for money and Alex talks to Karl Kennedy about it. Karl tells Stuart, who arrests Jonathan.
6 November 2003–12 July 2004	Declan Sands	Lewis Reed	Declan spreads rumours about Summer Hoyland because he likes her. Joe Scully teaches Summer to box and she punches Declan. Summer and Declan later spend time together and they go on a group date. They share a bad first kiss, but continue their relationship for a few months. Summer decides to break up with Declan for an older boy and she later sees him kissing Lisa Jeffries.
21 November 2003–9 June 2004	Aaron Barkley	Stewart Adam	Aaron is a mechanic who works at Carpenter's Mechanics with Stephanie Scully. All the women fancy him, but when Izzy Hoyland chats to him, she discovers that he is gay. Gino Esposito reveals that Aaron is his flatmate and they are in a relationship together. Gino and Aaron help Stingray Timmins when he goes on a date to posh restaurant. Gino is forced to move in with Harold Bishop when he and Aaron fall out, but they later make up. In 2025 it was confirmed that Aaron had died prior to Gino taking up residence at Eirini Rising.
