= Nina Tucker =

Fictional character in soap opera "Neighbours"

- Neighbours character
- Portrayed by: Delta Goodrem
- Duration: 2002–2005, 2015, 2022
- First appearance: 11 June 2002
- Last appearance: 28 July 2022
- Introduced by: Stanley Walsh (2002); Ric Pellizzeri (2004); Jason Herbison (2015)
- Book appearances: Rising Star (2005)
In-universe information
- Occupation: Student; Waitress; Chambermaid; Piano teacher; Singer; Actress
- Father: Nick Tucker
- Mother: Trixie Tucker
- Stepfather: Lou Carpenter

Nina Tucker is a fictional character from the Australian soap opera Neighbours, played by Delta Goodrem. She made her first screen appearance during the episode broadcast on 11 June 2002. Goodrem was approached by producers after they saw her video for her debut single. Goodrem, who had just signed a record deal, almost turned down the role of Nina as she felt the character did not suit her style of music. The role was rewritten for her and she joined the cast. A year later, she was diagnosed with Hodgkin's lymphoma and had to leave the show for treatment. Once her health improved, she made a return to Neighbours in 2004 to tie up Nina's storylines. In 2005, Neighbours celebrated its 20th anniversary with an episode that featured many ex-cast members, in which Goodrem reprised her role as Nina once more. She returned again in March 2015 for the show's 30th anniversary, and for the show's final episode on 28 July 2022.

Nina was originally written as a bad girl character, but when the writers rewrote the role for Goodrem, she became a painfully shy school student who was described as being the "quintessential girl-next-door". Nina learned to be independent from an early age as she was travelling with her parents all over the world. She has a complicated relationship with her mother, who she sees as an embarrassment to her. In 2004, her personality underwent a change, and she was no longer shy; she had grown up and had become more assured. Goodrem's manager suggested that Nina should be an aspiring singer and Neighbours developed the character to suit her. Goodrem worked with the writers to incorporate her music into the show. One of Nina's longest running storylines was her relationship with Jack Scully (Jay Bunyan). They began their relationship while they were seeing other people and they break up twice. However, Nina realises that she loves Jack and returns from India to tell him. Goodrem believed Nina and Jack were soulmates. Nina was well received, and Goodrem won the Most Popular New Female Talent Logie Award for the role.

== Casting ==
Neighbours approached Goodrem about appearing in the show after they saw the video for her debut single, "I Don't Care"; she was offered the role of Nina Tucker in early 2002. Goodrem almost turned down the part because she was not happy with the character written for her. She had just signed a record deal with Sony Records and felt the part did not suit her music. The Neighbours producers agreed to rewrite the role of Nina for her.

In July 2003, Goodrem was diagnosed with Hodgkin's lymphoma and was forced to leave the show to begin treatment. Goodrem was written out of Neighbours, and script producer, Luke Devenish, said: "She had to concentrate on her health, so there was no getting around it. There was absolutely no question of attempting to keep her working." Nina departed in October 2003, with an exit storyline that allowed for a return in the future. Three months' worth of scripts were rewritten, and a new character, Carmella Cammeniti (Natalie Blair), was created and introduced to cover Nina's planned storyline with Connor O'Neill (Patrick Harvey).

In March 2004, it was announced that Goodrem would be returning to Neighbours to finish her contract. Of her return, a spokesperson said "We never thought we'd see her back. Her illness stunned us all and her vastly improved health now thrills us. We can't wait for the days she's back on the set. This is where it all started for her." Goodrem told TV Week that it was important to her to tie up Nina's storylines and added: "I really felt that Nina and myself had a lot of unfinished business there." Goodrem returned to the set on 12 May. Due to Goodrem's busy schedule, the producers made sure all her scenes were shot in three days. She returned to screens in Australia on 6 September. Goodrem was one of many ex-cast members who returned to Neighbours in 2005 for an episode that celebrated the 20th anniversary of the show. Goodrem said that she "couldn't be happier" about going back to Neighbours.

== Development ==
=== Characterisation ===
"What a mystery Nina Tucker is. The singing voice of an angel, not to mention the looks of one too. And she plays piano beautifully. She's smart and helpful but she does seem to lack confidence."

— The BBC on Nina

Nina was initially meant to be a "bad girl", but the writers rewrote the part for Goodrem, and the character became a "painfully shy schoolgirl" who gets a job in the Coffee Shop. The Age described Nina as the "quintessential girl next door". Goodrem described her character as "a quiet, unassuming type of girl", who did not think anything of her amazing gift. When Goodrem was asked if she was similar to Nina, she replied "I think I am in some ways and in some ways I'm not. Nina's very shy, I really like the character Nina but I think she'd probably walk out of a room and I'd probably chat all day I think that's probably the difference, she'd sneak out of a room and I'd stay!" The BBC agreed with Goodrem and said that Nina would not say "boo to a goose" and would flee if anyone looked her way.

In 2003, Nina's mother, Trixie (Wendy Stapleton), arrived in Erinsborough after Nina's father, Nick, ended their relationship. Nina was upset to learn about her parents split and went into denial. She believed that they would get back together. Trixie was a professional singer and, during a set at Lou's Place, started to lose confidence, so Nina helped her out and saved the night. Stapleton stated that Nina and Trixie's relationship was complicated, and there were issues between them. Nina saw Trixie as an embarrassment, but she helped her out because she saw how sad her mother was. Stapleton explained more about Nina's early life saying, "Nina's life has been almost a gypsy one – living out of a suitcase while her parents toured. She's learned to be independent from an early age, though Trixie idolises her." Nina retreated into books and her imagination instead of being worldly from the travelling she has done. Stapleton and Goodrem did not get a chance to explore their respective character's relationship much further, as Goodrem was diagnosed with Hodgkin's lymphoma three weeks into the storyline. Scripts were changed so Nina was not directly involved and she was only mentioned by other characters.

When she returned in 2004, Nina was no longer shy and vulnerable. She had taken control of her life and became more assured. Goodrem welcomed her character's development and said Nina came back strong and confident. She also said: "I think she had to grow up. If she didn't come back a little bit older and wiser, then she wouldn't have learnt and grown from what's gone on in the year that she's been missing."

=== Singing career ===
Goodrem's manager, Glenn Wheatley, suggested making Nina into an aspiring singer. He said: "We didn't want that soap star-turned-singer vibe but how cool would it be if she already was a singer? Neighbours developed a character to suit her rather than the other way around." Goodrem worked with the writers to incorporate her music into the show, and Wheatley used the exposure that Neighbours gave Goodrem to relaunch her singing career. Nina had a powerful voice and wrote her own songs, but she was too shy to sing them in public. Harold Bishop (Ian Smith) discovered Nina's singing talent one day, and Connor entered one of her songs, "Born To Try", in a talent contest at UniFM, where it won. As Nina was too shy to go and receive the prize, Tahnee Coppin (Anna Jennings-Edquist) tried to take credit for the song instead. Connor stopped her and Nina overcame her shyness to sing her song. Within weeks of it being performed, "Born to Try" became the number one single in Australia.

=== Relationship with Jack Scully ===
Nina was in her first relationship with fellow student Taj Coppin (Jaime Robbie Reyne), when, during a trip away to the beach, Jack Scully (Jay Bunyan) realised he was attracted to her. When Nina was cast in Harold's play, Mission Erinsborough, alongside Jack, she realised that she liked him too and they begin an affair. Peter Mattessi of The Age said their love "bubbled until it almost erupted". Nina broke up with Taj so she could be with Jack, but before Jack could break up with his girlfriend Lori Lee (Michelle Ang), she was paralysed during an accident. Jack became torn over whether to leave Lori and be with Nina. Both Lori and Taj found out about Nina and Jack, so Nina decided to remain single, but eventually she and Jack began their relationship properly. When Nina told Jack that she was not ready to consummate their relationship, Jack cheated on her with Edwina Valdez (Lucia Smyrk). Taj told Nina about Jack's cheating and she broke up with him. She later kissed Connor in front of Jack to make him jealous. Jay Bunyan commented, "Jack gets really angry, especially with Connor, who is supposed to be his mate. He threatens to tell Nina about Connor getting Lori pregnant, as a way of getting back at him." Nina became confused about her love life and was unsure whether she still had feelings for Jack. She then decided to depart Erinsborough to go to India.

In 2004, Nina returned to win Jack back, after becoming an actress in the Indian film industry and realising that she was alone. Goodrem told TV Week, "she's been doing wonderful things in Bollywood and has been with her dad. But she was missing the love of life back in Australia, so she came back." Nina's arrival coincided with Jack's decision to get his life back together following a car crash due to his partying. Jack was "shocked" and "overwhelmed" to see Nina. Goodrem explained that Nina reminded him of what he once had and that he still had feelings for her. She said that she believed Jack and Nina were soul mates and added: "They have had a very rocky relationship, but I think they're even now." As Jack and Nina talked things through, they "fall back into each other's arms". Jack chose to leave Erinsborough to be with Nina.

=== Returns ===
On 25 November 2014, it was announced that Goodrem had agreed to reprise her role for Neighbours' 30th anniversary celebrations. Goodrem began filming that day and tweeted her excitement about Nina making a guest appearance. Her return featured during three episodes starting from 16 March 2015. Series producer Jason Herbison confirmed that the theme of music would tie into the character's return. It was later confirmed that Nina returns to Erinsborough after her relationship with Jack ends. Goodrem said she understood what her character was going through, saying "I have experienced the feelings Nina is going through. I've had those moments where you question where you are going and you have to look back to know where to move forward." The singer and actress said her return to Neighbours felt "natural" and she instantly knew what Nina would be wearing the moment she went into wardrobe.

Alana Wulff from TV Week reported that Nina would check into Lassiter's Hotel under a fake name, in order to stay incognito during her return. However, she is soon spotted by Lou Carpenter (Tom Oliver) and Susan Kennedy (Jackie Woodburne), who agree to keep her return a secret. This allows Nina to revisit her favourite haunts and reminisce about her time in Erinsborough. Goodrem told Wulff, "She's walking around feeling nostalgic. And seeing where life was so simple before everything went down with her." Nina even fills in for one of the maids at the hotel, which makes her feel "normal" again. When Paul Robinson (Stefan Dennis) see Nina, he asks her to perform at the Erinsborough Festival's closing concert, but she turns him down. However, Lou persuades her to change her mind, believing the concert will make her feel better about her life and break up with Jack.

On 28 July 2022, Goodrem returned for a one-off cameo appearance for the show's series finale.

== Storylines ==
Nina enrolls at Erinsborough High after her school work suffers because she has been travelling the world with her parents, Nick and Trixie. Nina is shy and concealed as a result of her neglect by her parents. Nina takes up two jobs at the Coffee Shop and at Lassiter's Hotel. The residents of Ramsay Street begin to notice that she is shy and has low self-esteem. One night, Harold Bishop hears Nina singing and realises that she is good, but Nina disagrees. Harold manages to convince Nina to join the church choir, and she is asked to perform a solo, but her nerves get to her and is not able to go through with their performance. Connor O'Neill also overhears Nina singing one day and becomes close with her, as he is the only teenager who knows about her talent.

Tahnee Coppin forces Nina to admit that she is in love with Connor and then threatens to tell his girlfriend, Michelle Scully (Kate Keltie). Nina records a song called "Born to Try", which is heard by Connor. He secretly enters the song into UniFM's undiscovered talent contest. Nina is angry with Connor at first but tells her that he did it for her so she could realise her potential. Nina's song wins the contest, but she is too shy to come forward, and Tahnee takes the credit instead. Connor takes Nina to the station and she admits that she wrote and sang the song. Nina then overcomes her fears to sing "Born to Try" for the crowd, which upsets Tahnee. Nina's prize is to sing at a nightclub; afterwards, she is approached by Glenn Wheatley, but she turns down his offer.

Nina asks out Taj Coppin, after he sends her text messages, and they begin a relationship. Nina and Jack Scully are pushed into auditioning for roles in Harold's new play, and they have to perform a kiss on stage. As they went on rehearsing, they begin to get closer to each other, and they start an affair. Nina breaks up with Taj, but before Jack can break up with Lori Lee, she has an accident. Jack eventually tells Lori about Nina, and when Nina tries to apologise, Lori tells her that she will not be forgiven. Nina then tells Jack that they cannot be together. Nina sticks up for Tahnee when she is being bullied, and they become friends. Nina and Jack get back together, but when Jack tries to take things further, Nina tells him she is a virgin. Jack tells her that he is willing to wait.

Talent manager Melody Jones (Robyn Arthur) approaches Nina and asks her to sign with her. Nina forges her mother's signature on the forms and gets a regular singing gig at Lou Carpenter's pub. Nina leaves for a tour of Asia, but when she gets back she hears another singer singing one of her songs on the radio. Nina is told that she signed the rights to her music away, but Lou points out that the contract is not valid as Nina forged a signature on it. Nina sleeps with Jack for the first time, but when Taj tells her that Jack cheated on her with Edwina Valdez, their relationship ends. Nina starts getting closer to Connor and, to make Jack jealous, kisses Connor at the Lassiter's Ball.

Nina's mother, Trixie, arrives in town, and Lou gives her a singing job at his pub as he fancies her. Nina is upset to learn that Trixie and Nick are no longer together, and, when Trixie tells her that she was not married to her father, Nina leaves for Bombay to see Nick. Trixie and Lou later marry. Nina returns a year later after becoming an actress in Bollywood. She goes to see Jack and tells him that she wants to be with him. She also visits Lou and gives him some money, as Trixie had left him bankrupt. Lyn Scully (Janet Andrewartha) tells Nina that Jack needs to stay in Australia so he can sort himself out. Nina performs her last concert at Lou's Place, and she tells Jack that she will wait for him. Months later, Jack flies out to Los Angeles to be with Nina.

In 2015, Nina returns to Erinsborough. She checks into Lassiter's under a false name, and catches up with Lou and Susan. Nina goes for a walk around the town and Ramsay Street, reminiscing about her time there. She later offers to be a chambermaid at the hotel, after seeing how short staffed Terese Willis (Rebekah Elmaloglou) is. Nina tries to avoid Paul Robinson, who wants her to play at the Erinsborough Festival. She admits to Karl and Susan that she and Jack have split up, which has affected her song writing. Nina eventually finds inspiration to write a song, but she refuses Paul's offer to play at the festival, so Karl is offered the chance to be the closing act. Nina changes her mind after Lou encourages her to take a chance, while Karl fakes a sore throat. Jack later sends her a text, telling her that he likes her new song and he asks her to meet him in Florence. Lou reveals to Nina that he sent Jack a video of her performing, and she thanks him, Karl and Susan, before leaving town to meet Jack. Seven years later, Nina sends in a video call message to congratulate Toadie Rebecchi (Ryan Moloney) and Melanie Pearson (Lucinda Cowden) on their wedding.

== Reception ==
For her portrayal of Nina, Goodrem received the Most Popular New Female Talent accolade at the 2003 Logie Awards. She also earned a nomination for Best Newcomer at the Inside Soap Awards. The following year, Goodrem was nominated for Most Popular Actress and Most Popular Personality at the Logie Awards. A writer for the BBC's Neighbours website said Nina's most notable moment was "Cheating on Taj with Jack Scully".

To celebrate Neighbours' 25th anniversary, Sky included Nina in their list of the twenty-five most memorable Neighbours characters. They stated, "Nina represents just about the only recognisable name from the lost years of Neighbours in the early noughties, as one of the least successful groups of teens in the programme's history. Remember Lori? Or Michelle? Or, Lord help us, Taj? In the absence of any usable characters, the writers did that always uncomfortable thing of letting a character get up and sing on screen. Repeatedly." They described her most memorable scenes as being discovered singing by Harold, her mother's marriage to Lou, and her relationship with Jack.

TV Week named Nina's passion for singing as one of Neighbours' "most exciting storylines ever". They said: "When it was discovered she could sing, Nina Tucker was transformed from shy highschool student into a star performer and a bit of a heart-breaker. This was cut short when Delta was diagnosed with Hodgkin's disease, leaving us in the lurch and wondering about her love affair... triangle... quadrangle!" TV Week later included Nina in their "Top 25 Neighbours characters".

While reviewing Nina's return scenes in 2015, Anna Brain of the Herald Sun commented "Nina Tucker (Delta Goodrem) is back in town, just as beautiful and bland as the day she left Erinsborough. So much has happened since releasing her first album, like, releasing more albums. There, we're all caught up." Brain's fellow critic Cameron Adams observed how the character and actress had become similar, writing "Delta Goodrem's back on Ramsay Street! Yes, Nina Tucker just casually strolls into the cafe asking for Harold. Soon she is filling in Lou and Susan about her fame and how she has been releasing albums 'every couple of years like clockwork'. Susan tells her: 'Karl still jogs to 'Born to Try', the dance remix.' Yes, the Nina/Delta lines are blurred, but Nina does take a large step back in time to work at Lassiters hotel." A Herald Sun reporter included Nina's 2015 return in their "Neighbours' 30 most memorable moments" feature.
