= Gino Esposito =

Fictional character from Neighbours

- Neighbours character
- Portrayed by: Claude Stevens (2000); Shane McNamara (2001–2025)
- Duration: 2000–2007, 2024–2025
- First appearance: 11 August 2000
- Last appearance: 5 November 2025
- Introduced by: Stanley Walsh (2000); Jason Herbison (2024)
In-universe information
- Other names: Ray Murphy (birth name)
- Occupation: Hairdresser; Owner of A Good Hair Day; Retired

Gino Esposito is a fictional character from the Australian soap opera Neighbours, played by Shane McNamara. The character made his first appearance during the episode broadcast on 11 August 2000. The character was originally played by Claude Stevens. McNamara was cast in the role when the character was reintroduced in 2001. Gino owned a hair salon called A Good Hair Day, which employed both Lyn Scully (Janet Andrewartha) and Janelle Timmins (Nell Feeney). Script producer Luke Devenish called Gino "a [gay] stereotype" and a comedic character, similar to Mr. Humphries from the British sitcom Are You Being Served?. He last appeared on 27 June 2007, before returning as a new resident of the Eirini Rising retirement community on 19 September 2024. The character was added to the show's opening titles on 15 April 2025. Gino made his final appearance on 5 November 2025, shortly before the show's conclusion.

== Development ==
In 1995, Neighbours introduced a storyline about the bullying of gay teacher, Andrew Watson (Christopher Uhlman), which was a turning point for the show, however, it took another five years before another gay male character was introduced. Gino made his first appearance in 2000 played by Claude Stevens, before McNamara took over. He was a church organist who owned the local hair salon and spoke about his flatmate Aaron often. It was later revealed that Aaron was his partner. Neighbours script producer, Luke Devenish said of the character, "He is a [gay] stereotype, and we don't have a problem with that as he is not a negative stereotype, he is a comic character and it is for a laugh – in the Mr Humphries [of Are You Being Served] kind of tradition". David Knox of TV Tonight called Gino an "incidental gay male character." When Gino moves in with Harold Bishop (Ian Smith), the writers decided to tweak the "standard love triangle story" with Lou Carpenter (Tom Oliver) becoming jealous of the duo. Harold and Gino get along very well and share a love of musicals. Of this, Peter Mattessi of The Age said "The tension this created between Lou and Harold ("same-sex platonic life-partners", according to Toadie) was a wonderful storytelling twist, and the innuendo made Gino's sexuality clear to those in the know, yet avoided the questions from younger viewers which would jeopardise the G rating." The character's appearances led to "more prominent representation" in the show, as further gay male characters were introduced and added to the main cast.

In early September 2024, promotional pictures for the serial's upcoming episodes confirmed McNamara had reprised the role, as Gino returns as a new resident of the fictional retirement community Eirini Rising on 19 September. The character appears in multiple episodes as he is reunited with former friends, including Harold Bishop. The pair have "a much-needed catch-up" as they now both reside in Eirini Rising.

== Storylines ==
Gino was born Ray Murphy, but he decided to change his name when he became a hairdresser. Gino formed a reputation as a top hairdresser, and he decided to open his own hair salon. He bought the A Good Hair Day salon in the Lassiter's Complex in 2001, which concerned Lyn Scully (Janet Andrewartha), who had been managing it for the previous owner. Gino and Lyn were rivals, and Lyn began dressing younger as she knew that Gino favoured young, pretty hair stylists. Gino put Lyn on a month's trial to see if she could juggle her family and her commitments to the salon. Lyn quit after Gino started taking her regular clients away from her. Lyn decides to branch out on her own and take Gino's clients with her. When Gino finds out about her plans, he threatens to blacken Lyn's name around the town. Lyn tells Gino that she knows his real name is Ray Murphy. Gino is shocked and does not want his reputation ruined, so he accepts Lyn's resignation. Gino's business suffers without Lyn, and he tells her that he made a mistake in mistreating her. Lyn then agrees to come back.

Gino becomes involved in the Erinsborough Amateur Players and asks Joe Scully (Shane Connor) to build him some sets. Both men clash with their different ideas, but eventually come to respect each other. Gino also becomes a wedding planner and Susan Kennedy (Jackie Woodburne) asks him for his help with her second wedding to Karl Kennedy (Alan Fletcher). Gino's plans are too much for Susan and Karl, and when they go to reject them, Gino tells them that his commitments to the Erinsborough Players' mean he cannot commit to planning the wedding. When Gino falls out with his boyfriend, Aaron Barkley (Stewart Adam), Gino discovers that Harold Bishop has a room to rent. Gino and Harold bond over their love of musicals and vegetarian food, and Harold invites Gino to move in. Gino later makes up with Aaron and moves back in with him. However, Gino arrives back at Harold's within a few hours of leaving, as he and Aaron had fallen out again. Harold tries to get rid of Gino, and when he cooks a lot of meat and eats a sausage, although it was vegetarian, in front of him, Gino leaves and goes back to Aaron.

Gino asks Joe if he could be godfather to his and Lyn's son, Oscar Scully (Ingo Dammer-Smith). Gino explains that he will never have kids of his own, and his nieces and nephews live too far away. Joe agrees to give it some thought. On the day of Oscar's christening, Joe discovers that Gino has decorated the church, and he asks him to be Oscar's fourth godparent. Gino comes between Harold and Lou Carpenter (Tom Oliver) when he and Lou start spending a lot of time together. Harold becomes jealous when Gino, Lou and two girls from the salon go away together, and Gino and Lou begin partying with each other. However, both Lou and Harold support Gino when Boyd Hoyland (Kyal Marsh) accuses Gino of trying to come onto him. Gino is left shaken by the incident. He eventually put the incident behind him when Boyd apologised. Gino writes a play about a country boy who arrives in the city dreaming of stardom and he casts Ned Parker (Daniel O'Connor) in the lead role. On the morning of the opening night, Gino injures his back, and Karl takes over his duties. Karl also fills in for Ned after he injures his knee. Following the opening night, no more tickets are sold and Gino's play finishes. A few weeks later, Gino announces that he is going to take his baby pageants on tour around Australia, and he sells the salon to Steve Parker (Steve Bastoni), who turns it into his veterinary practice.

Years later, Gino returns to Erinsborough and moves into the Eirini Rising retirement community and catches up with the Kennedys, who help him to settle in. He reunites with Harold, and they go for drinks at the Waterhole. He later protests with Moira Tohu (Robyn Arthur) on behalf of Hilary Robinson (Anne Scott Pendlebury), to shut down a burlesque event at Lassiters Hotel. He participates in a seniors' woodwork class at the retirement complex with fellow residents. After Terese Willis (Rebekah Elmaloglou) reverses into a valve and causes a gas leak at Eirini, Gino assists in getting all the residents out safely, before collapsing outside. He is taken to hospital, where he suffers a heart attack, but makes a steady recovery.

== Reception ==
The Sydney Star Observer said that "at times, Gino has also shown astonishing depth. Like when he was fighting to become godfather to Lyn's baby son Oscar". They said that the situation was something "a lot of gay men can relate to" as Gino explained that he was unlikely to have a child of his own. The newspaper added "We went beyond the froth with him and it was quite moving". Of the character of Gino and his relationship with Harold Bishop, David Knox said "Gino eventually ended up sharing house with Harold, frequently watching musicals on DVD together but never speaking about the love that dare not speak its name..." Daniel Kilkelly of Digital Spy stated that Gino was "one of the most memorable recurring characters of the show's noughties era."
