= Jack Scully =

Fictional character

- Neighbours character
- Jay Bunyan as Jack Scully
- Portrayed by: Paul Pantano (2001); Jay Bunyan (2002–05)
- Duration: 2001–2005
- First appearance: 17 April 2001
- Last appearance: 11 January 2005
- Introduced by: Stanley Walsh
- Book appearances: Rising Star (2005)
In-universe information
- Occupation: Footballer; Student; Labourer
- Father: Joe Scully
- Mother: Lyn Scully
- Brothers: Oscar Scully
- Sisters: Stephanie Scully; Felicity Scully; Michelle Scully
- Grandfathers: Pat Scully; Charlie Cassidy
- Grandmothers: Valda Sheergold
- Uncles: Mick Scully; Tom Scully; Michael Cassidy
- Nephews: Charlie Hoyland; Adam Fitzgerald

Jack Scully is a fictional character from the Australian soap opera Neighbours, played by Jay Bunyan. He made his first on-screen appearance on 17 April 2001. The character was initially played by Paul Pantano in a guest role. When he returned in 2002, Bunyan had taken over the role. Jack is the first son of Joe and Lyn Scully. He departed on 8 December 2004, with a further appearance on 11 January 2005.

== Casting ==
Following the introduction of the Scully family in 1999, Jack was often mentioned by his parents and siblings. In 2001, Paul Pantano was cast in the role of Jack and introduced to the show. Pantano and Jack left that same year. When the character was reintroduced in 2002, Jay Bunyan took over the role. Bunyan was auditioned for the role in New Zealand by Jan Russ. He and Michelle Ang (Lori Lee) impressed Russ and their roles were especially written into the storylines. Bunyan was nineteen when he joined the cast. He relocated to Melbourne for filming and signed a two-year contract.

In December 2003, Linda Barnie of the Newcastle Herald reported Bunyan was considering leaving Neighbours. Bunyan's departure was confirmed the following year, as he wanted to pursue new acting roles in the United States and tour with his one-man play The Packer. He told James Elliott of the BBC that the producers had wanted him to sign a contract for another few years to keep the Scully family alive on the show. However, he admitted that he wanted to finish as he had had enough. During an interview published in Inside Soap, Bunyan revealed that he had only ever intended to stay with the soap for two years. Bunyan filmed his final scenes on 30 July 2004, alongside Ang, who returned from New Zealand for two days. Bunyan admitted that it was only during the filming of his last scene did he realise that it would be the final time he would play Jack. He explained: "That's a bit weird. Jack's pretty close to myself, actually, except for the storylines. And maybe his accent's a bit twangier. I will miss Jack because I get to play this deviant character. But there will be other characters to play." Bunyan added that he would miss his co-stars the most, but not the early mornings.

== Development ==
=== Introduction and characterisation ===
"Jack's a lovely young man, although possibly a little feisty. He certainly set the cat among the pigeons with the local teenage girls when he came to Erinsborough."

— The BBC on Jack

Jack is the eldest son of Joe (Shane Connor) and Lyn Scully (Janet Andrewartha). He is the brother of Stephanie (Carla Bonner), Felicity (Holly Valance), Michelle (Kate Keltie) and Oscar (Ingo Dammer-Smith). Before his introduction, Jack was said to be a champion footballer playing for Barnsford FC in England. When Jack's family learn he has disappeared and no one can track him down, they become concerned. Bonner told Inside Soap "Joe and Lyn are really worried, especially because they are so far away and there seems to be nothing they can do about it." Jack eventually turned up in Ramsay Street and shocked his family by announcing his decision to quit football. Joe gets Jack a job on his building site, but Jack decided playing football was not so bad and he returned to England. The character returned to Neighbours in 2002, now played by Bunyan. Jack's girlfriend, Lori Lee (Ang), was introduced a week later and it was revealed that Jack had been dropped by Barnsford and he had spent his time in New Zealand with Lori and her family. Andrew Mercado, author of Super Aussie Soaps, said Jack was not pleased Lori had followed him to Erinsborough. Bunyan described Jack as "a bit of an idiot" and said he was quite different from his character.

=== Relationship with Nina Tucker ===
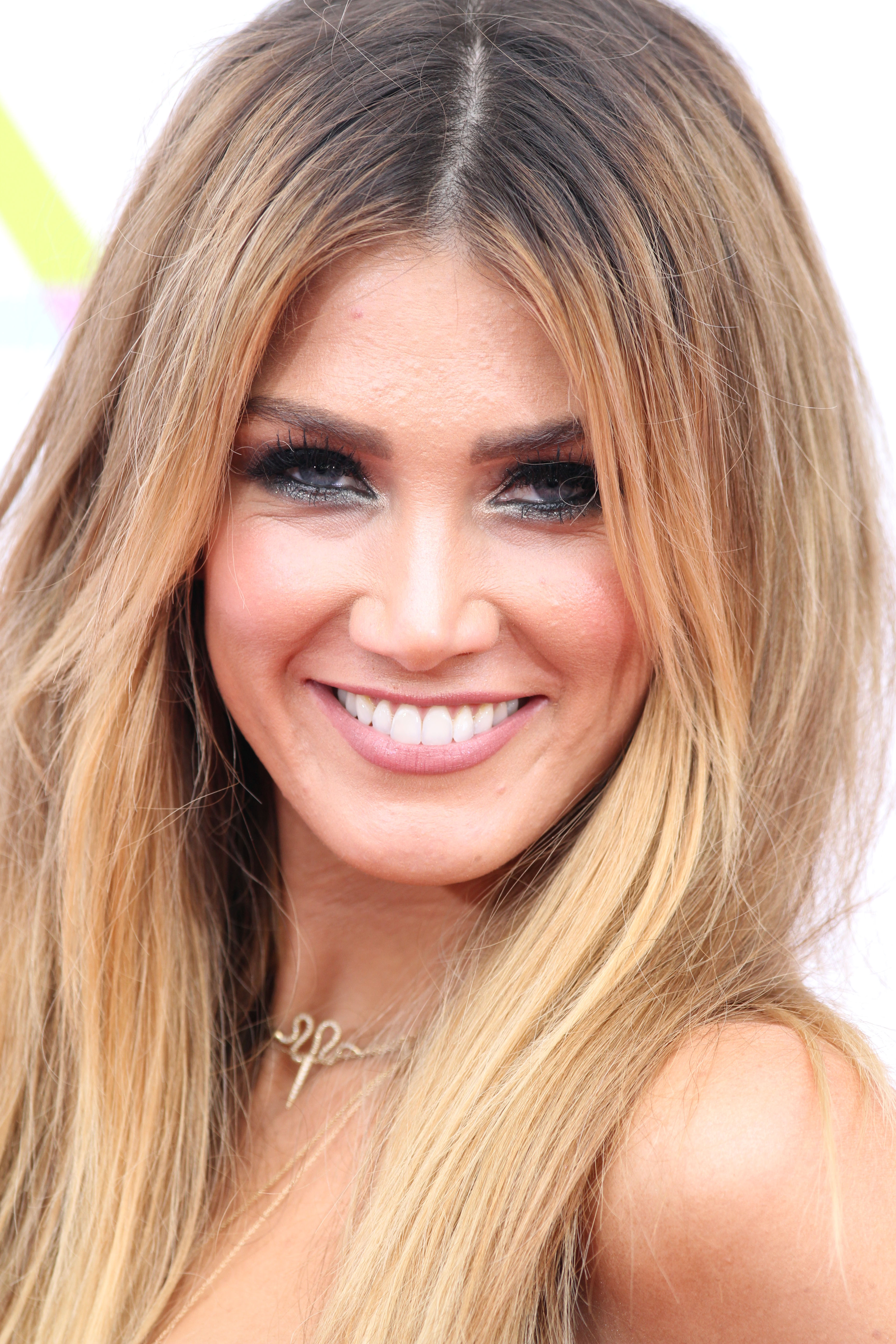
Goodrem believed Nina and Jack were soul mates, despite the ups and downs they endured during their relationship.

During a trip away to the beach, Jack realised he was attracted to Nina Tucker (Delta Goodrem) and he thought about replacing Lori with her. Jack and Nina are cast in Harold Bishop's (Ian Smith) play Mission Erinsborough, and they began an affair. Peter Mattessi of The Age said Jack and Nina's love "bubbled until it almost erupted." Nina broke up with her boyfriend Taj Coppin (Jaime Robbie Reyne) to be with Jack, but when Jack tried to do the same with Lori, he learnt she had been paralysed from the waist down due to a fall. Jack became torn over whether to leave Lori and be with Nina and he confided in his younger sister, Michelle. Mattessi said bringing in another character to the story meant "more tension, which delivered a bigger climax" and provided weeks of fallout. Both Lori and Taj find out about Nina and Jack, and Nina decides to remain single. However, she and Jack eventually decide to begin their relationship again.

When Nina told Jack she was not ready to have sex with him, he cheated on her with Edwina Valdez (Lucia Smyrk). Nina later broke up with him and Jack became depressed. Jack encountered Izzy Hoyland (Natalie Bassingthwaighte), who had just been rejected by a younger guy, in the pub and she invited him back to her hotel room. Bunyan told Inside Soap that Izzy is the one person who makes Jack feel better and she is totally supportive of him, Jack thinks she understands him. Jack goes back to Izzy's hotel room and they have sex. Of this, Bunyan said "Izzy is quite upfront about it - she doesn't want a relationship. She just wants a bit of fun, which suits Jack perfectly. He's actually quite broken hearted over Nina, and Izzy helps him feel good about himself." Jack witnessed Nina kissing Connor O'Neill (Patrick Harvey) and he got really angry with Connor, who was his best friend. He threatened Connor and became jealous of his friendship with Nina. Jack was also having problems with Izzy and their relationship. Bunyan explained Izzy was calling the shots and taking Jack for a ride, which was quite a role reversal. Bunyan added "It's a totally different relationship to Jack and Nina, which makes it new and interesting to play."

Goodrem departed Neighbours in 2003 after she was diagnosed with Hodgkin's lymphoma. Her character became confused about her love life and struggled with her feelings for Jack. She decided to leave Erinsborough to go visit her father in India. Goodrem returned to Neighbours in September 2004 to tie up Nina's storylines. Goodrem told Jackie Brygel of TV Week that Nina returned to Erinsborough because she was missing Jack, the love of her life. Nina's return was bad timing for Jack, who had recently been involved in a near-fatal car accident due to his drug taking. Bunyan told Brygel "It's a little too much for Jack to bear at this point. He thinks Nina has come back and she's this amazing movie star. She looks fantastic and I'm this drop kick who has just had a major car accident, ruined me parents' business and is trying to get off the drugs!" Jack was overwhelmed and excited to see Nina, and the couple eventually fell back into each other's arms. Nina left to go to America and Jack eventually joined her in 2005.

=== Partying and drug addiction ===
In June 2004, Jack became the centre of a storyline which saw him partying and taking drugs. When he finds himself being mocked by his co-workers on the building site, his frustration leads him to start partying in nightclubs to forget his problems. Police constable Olivia McPherson (Silvia de Crespigny) was introduced to the storyline shortly after. She and Jack meet in a nightclub and he realises she likes partying as much as he does. Bunyan told a writer for TV Week: "This is the first time Jack's met a girl who is into what he's into. He latches onto her and, once again, he thinks he's found the love of his life." Jack and Olivia form a bond when they both reveal their reason for partying is work troubles. Jack and Olivia go out partying at night and Jack returns home in the early hours. Jack's mother challenges him to just be friends with Olivia as she becomes sick of him thinking he is in love with every girl that pays attention to him. Jack's partying affects his work and he suffers a nasty fall, after he goes from the club to the building site. Bunyan explained "Jack's very tired and weary-eyed and he gets up a ladder without a harness, and goes to do a roof job and has a terrible slip." Lyn and Karl Kennedy (Alan Fletcher) question Jack about how much time he has been spending in clubs, but he refuses to answer them.

Olivia soon introduces Jack to drugs. When Bunyan received the scripts revealing Jack was going to become a drug addict, he decided to get away from his character's "pretty boy image" and grew his hair long. He commented "The make-up artists would try and touch up my face and I'd say, 'no, I'm supposed to be on drugs!' So I'd go on set with no make-up and would rub my eyes and look like a scruff." To raise money for their new lifestyle, Jack and Olivia steal some tools from the building site to sell. Olivia persuades Jack to frame Darren Stark (Todd MacDonald) for the theft. Bunyan said Jack would have taken the blame for the theft himself if Olivia had not been pressuring him. The following week, Jack wakes up in the gutter following yet another night out with no recollection of what has happened. He is found and taken home by Max Hoyland (Stephen Lovatt) and Lou Carpenter (Tom Oliver). Becoming worried about Jack, Max tells Steph about the incident and she confronts Jack about his partying and her suspicions that he is taking drugs. Bunyan was pleased with the storyline, calling it "really cool, because it's branched out and got a bit edgy. It's the first time a character's really had the whole drug thing happening on Neighbours." Bunyan said Jack would have "a lot of brushes with death" before his departure from the series. He also said he had filmed some stunts, including a car crash, but his final storyline would be "nice" to go out on.

== Storylines ==
Jack first arrives in Ramsay Street, much to the surprise and relief of his parents who had been notified by his coach in London that he has gone AWOL. Jack is on hand to support his sister Stephanie when her boyfriend Larry "Woody" Woodhouse (Andrew Curry) is forced to go into witness protection. When Jack tells his parents that he wants to give up the soccer and return to Australia permanently and follow his father Joe into the building trade, Joe devises a plan to make Jack change his mind. After realising he is not ideal for his father's line of work, Jack returns to London.

The following year Jack returns, followed by his girlfriend Lori Lee and they settle into the Scully house. Not long after their arrival, Jack becomes attracted to Michelle's friend Nina Tucker when he and several other teens go on schoolies. Jack unwittingly lands the lead in Harold Bishop's play Mission Erinsborough, which is directed by Lori and is cast opposite Nina, who is dating Taj Coppin. Jack and Nina begin meeting in secret and though both feel guilty, they can not resist the temptation. The truth is revealed after Nina dumps Taj and there is ill feeling for a while between the boys. A while later, Nina reveals to Jack she is still a virgin and wants him to be her first. However, Edwina Valdez arrives on the scene and seduces Jack. Taj unwittingly informs Nina – who he assumed already knew. Nina then ends things with Jack.

Jack and Taj later contemplating cheating on their VCE by using stolen exam papers a friend of Taj's managed to obtain. The boys use the paper and get an attack of conscience when a story is leaked about stolen exam papers and panic that Taj's friend will turn them in. In the end, the boys own up. After leaving school, Jack has a second try at labouring on the site with Joe. After being generally ribbed and mocked, Jack manages to persevere.

When Lori returns with her and Connor O'Neill's daughter, Madeleine (Madison Lu), Jack decides to stand by her. Lyn, Jack's mother warns Lori of her son's nature and arranges for her to take a job at a salon in Lorne. Jack later meets Olivia McPherson (Silvia de Crespigny) while out clubbing and she introduces him to drugs. As Jack's party lifestyle starts to take over, he begins making mistakes on the site and he and Olivia steal tools to make some money. Olivia suggests framing Darren Stark, who is working as an electrician, for the site robbery as Darren has prior convictions. This backfires as Jack's drugged-out behaviour comes to a head when he crashes his car into a power pylon, knocking out all the power in the local area. He is then charged with driving under the influence. Jack finds out that Olivia is a crooked police officer and she is later exposed by colleague Stuart Parker (Blair McDonough).

Charlie Cassidy (Cliff Ellen), Jack's grandfather arrives to spend what is to be his last Christmas with the family, and advises Jack to join Nina in America, even paying for the ticket. Jack checks into a hotel in Los Angeles to find Nina preparing the room and the two reunite.

== Reception ==
For his portrayal of Jack, Bunyan was nominated for "Most Popular New Male Talent" at the 2003 Logie Awards. The BBC said Jack's most notable moments were "Playing football for Barnsford in England" and "Cheating on Lori with Nina." Linda Barnier of the Newcastle Herald said Jack was a womaniser who could not keep out of trouble. Ahead of Jack's departure, critics for the Herald Sun noted "it won't be an easy last few weeks. He's been causing a stir with his drug use and partying." The character was popular in terms of his appearance. Nick Levine of media and entertainment website Digital Spy claimed in a section aimed specifically at gay readers, that "Neighbours' Jack Scully (Jay Bunyan) was in pretty good shape, wasn't he? Must have been all that soccer training...".
