= Paul Pantano =

Australian actor

- Born: Paolo Giuseppe Pantano; 23 February 1982 (age 44); Glebe, New South Wales, Australia
- Occupation: Actor
- Years active: 1992–present

Paolo Giuseppe Pantano (born 23 February 1982), known professionally as Paul Pantano, is an Australian actor.

== Early life ==
The son of Italian parents, Pantano was born and raised in the Sydney suburb of Glebe. He attended De La Salle College Ashfield.

== Career ==
Pantano received his first role appearing on the series Police Rescue, followed by a guest appearance in police drama series Water Rats. Pantano appeared in the series again in 1998. This performance earned him the Young Actor's Award at the 40th Australian Film Institute Awards. He received his first leading role that same year when he was cast as Marcello Di Campili in the children's television series Crash Zone, playing the character for two seasons until 2001. That same year, he was cast as Jack Scully in Neighbours. When the character was reintroduced the following year, actor Jay Ryan took over the role.

Pantano's other leading roles where in the critically acclaimed FOX8 drama series Dangerous, Breakers, and miniseries Marking Time. Pantano has also appeared in many recurring roles on popular series, including Close Contact, Wildside, Stingers, Blue Heelers, All Saints, the television mini-series The Pacific, and Home and Away as Elliot Gillen.

Pantano received his first film role in 1995 having a part in Mighty Morphin Power Rangers: The Movie. He has also appeared in the films Son of the Mask and Stealth. He had a leading role in Australian boxing film Two Fists, One Heart. In 2013, Pantano was cast in Sam Fox: Extreme Adventures as Miguel. He also appeared in short film Melvis, and web series The Army within.

== Filmography ==
Year	Title	Role	Notes
1992	Police Rescue	Kid 1	Episode: "Heartbeat"
1995	Mighty Morphin Power Rangers: The Movie	Kid	
1997	Water Rats	Rap	Episode: "The Messenger"
1997–1998	Wildside	Joe Pellucci	6 episodes
1998	Water Rats	Max Ryde	Episode: "Romeo is Bleeding"; Young Actor's Award
1999–2001	Crash Zone	Marcello Di Campili	Leading role; 26 episodes
1999	All Saints	Nicholas Walsh	Episode: "True Love and the Blues"
1999	Close Contact	Scott	Television film
1999	Breakers	Cameron	Television soap
2001	Neighbours	Jack Scully	6 episodes
2001	Outriders	Mac	4 episodes
2001	The Big House	Anthony	Short film
2000–2001	Stingers	Carlo Giuseppe	3 episodes
2001	Blue Heelers	Nipper Brown	2 episodes
2002	Running Down These Dreams	Sauce	Short film
2002	Young Lions	Aziz Najah	Episode: "Pilot"
2000–2003	Grass Roots	Ned Schumaker	5 episodes
2003	White Collar Blue	Laser	Episode: season 2, episode 13
2003	Marking Time	Remus Migotso	Television mini-series
2004	The Mystery of Natalie Wood	Sal Mineo	Television film
2005	All Saints	Reuben Shah	Episode: "Reckless"
2005	Son of the Mask	Halloween Party-Goer	
2005	Stealth	Naval Controller	
2005	Second Chance	Sean Brady	Television film
2007	Dangerous	Joe	Leading role; 8 episodes
2008	Two Fists, One Heart	Theo	
2008	The List	Paul Subiaco	Short film
2008	Home and Away	Elliot Gillen	12 episodes
2008	All Saints	Toby Ellis	Episode: "When the Party's Over"
2008	Out of the Blue	Shaun	4 episodes
2009	Bombshell	Yanni	Short Film
2010	The Pacific	Angelo Basilone	Television mini-series; 2 episodes
2010	Cops L.A.C.	Rollie Tyler	Episode: "Ghost House"
2013	Sam Fox: Extreme Adventures	Miguel	
2013	The Army Within	Traye	
2013	Melvis	A.K Winkler (Motivational Speaker)	
2015	Miss Fisher's Murder Mysteries	Vincenzo Strano	Episode: "Murder and Mozarella"
