= Lyn Scully =

Fictional character from the Australian soap opera Neighbours

- Neighbours character
- Portrayed by: Janet Andrewartha
- Duration: 1999–2006, 2008–2011, 2016–2017, 2019
- First appearance: 20 October 1999
- Last appearance: 3 September 2019
- Introduced by: Stanley Walsh (1999); Ric Pellizzeri (2008); Susan Bower (2009); Jason Herbison (2016)
In-universe information
- Occupation: Hairdresser; Salesperson; Life coach; Personal assistant; Salon owner; Harold's Store owner; Café owner
- Father: Charlie Cassidy
- Mother: Valda Sheergold
- Adoptive father: Henry O'Rourke
- Half-brothers: Michael Cassidy
- Husband: Joe Scully (1978–2004); Paul Robinson (2006–2009)
- Sons: Jack Scully; Oscar Scully
- Daughters: Stephanie Scully; Felicity Scully; Michelle Scully
- Grandsons: Charlie Hoyland; Adam Fitzgerald; Boyd Hoyland (step)
- Granddaughters: Summer Hoyland (step)
- Aunts: Connie O'Rourke; Doreen Cassidy

Lyn Scully is a fictional character from the Australian soap opera Neighbours, played by Janet Andrewartha. The character made her first screen appearance during the episode broadcast on 20 October 1999, along with her family and remained a prominent feature within the show until late 2006. Andrewartha reprised her role for a brief return in 2008 and then returned permanently in August 2009. Lyn departed again on 26 May 2011, so Andrewartha could pursue new acting opportunities. She reprised the role again in 2016, 2017 and 2019.

== Creation and casting ==
The character was created along with her family, which initially included husband Joe (Shane Connor), eldest daughter Stephanie (Carla Bonner), second eldest Felicity (Holly Valance), and youngest daughter Michelle (Kate Keltie). The Scullys were introduced on 20 October 1999 following the departure of the Martin family. The Scullys were the first new family to be introduced to the show since 1996. Former Prisoner actress Janet Andrewartha was cast as the family matriarch Lyn. A year prior to her casting, she told her agent that she wanted an acting job that would keep her working in Melbourne. Six months later, her agent contacted her to ask whether she would take a role on Neighbours. Andrewartha talked with the producers and did a screen test, before accepting the part of Lyn.

== Development ==
=== Characterisation ===
Network Ten publicity describe Lyn as going under something of a transformation since first arriving in Erinsborough. Commenting that in her early days Lyn was a suburban earth mother who ran a home, a hairdressing salon and helped husband Joe out with his business. Then stating that she turned into a woman determined to seek revenge after being hurt by her former lover Paul Robinson (Stefan Dennis). When Lyn returned in 2009 she had changed dramatically, she became less passive and more willing to put up a fight. Andrewartha commented on these changes stating: "She's less passive than she was, which is a good thing. She always gives something a go and that impresses me. Although she's making enormous mistakes since coming back to the street, she's always well intentioned." She was also impressed by the way they changed her over the period of time she was off-screen stating: "I quite like the way they've done that. As happens in life, one meets people one hasn't seen in a few years, and they perhaps have a harder edge to them and life has treated them rather roughly. You see a world weariness about them and more fight than they had."

Lyn also gained tendencies that mirrored Paul's personality and she became more feisty and willing to fight her enemies. "Certainly some of his toughness and his more brittle attitude to life have rubbed off on Lyn [...] there's more worldliness about her. She's not quite as gullible as she was. She's much more feisty and willing to fight. I think that all started with her falling in love with Paul and admiring those qualities in him." Andrewartha has stated that if Lyn could choose to be with any of her previous men, she would choose Joe Mangel (Mark Little).

During an interview on the BBC website, Andrewartha was asked if she was happy with her character's dramatic changes in clothing style and she stated that: "We had a change of designer and I couldn't have been more thrilled. I feel a little bit more comfortable in her gear now. I love the way she's constantly changing. I believe one of the really main essences of soap is change and we shouldn't be afraid to alter things. I'm all for change."

=== Departure and reintroduction ===
Andrewartha left Neighbours in August 2006, with Lyn's on screen departure occurring 7 December 2006. Andrewartha made two returns to the show, one in January 2008 and shown in May of that year. In 2009, Neighbours' script editor Pete McTighe teased of a potential return: "Watch this space. You'll see an old favourite return to the street in the second half of 2009. Who I've missed like mad!" It was later announced that Andrewartha had agreed to return originally contracted for three months, this was later extended to six months. She was later contracted further meaning she would be appearing on a long-term recurring basis. In March 2010, Andrewartha told Channel Five's Holy Soap website that she would be staying with the show for another year as a series regular.

In April 2011. TV Week revealed that the character was to leave Neighbours. Of her decision to leave, Andrewartha said "I originally came back in a guest role and ended up staying for nearly two years, so the extra time has been a bonus. It's been tremendous fun and I'll miss it, but it's time to try some new things."

=== Returns ===
Andrewartha reprised her role again in late 2015. Andrewartha had returned to the theatre following her 2011 exit, and she admitted that she had not thought about Neighbours until she was asked to come back. She stated, "It's always lovely catching up with older cast as we have shared so many story lines. However, it is also lovely to work with the new cast as well, including my new grandson and of course reconnecting with my daughter Carla [Bonner]. She still calls me 'Mamma'!" Lyn returns to Erinsborough during the episode broadcast on 1 February 2016. She comes to see Steph, who has moved back to the town after a stay in a psychiatric hospital. Lyn also wants to help Steph reconnect with her son Charlie Hoyland (Xander McGuire).

While Steph is pleased to see Lyn again, Lyn's former husband Paul is not, as he has recently lost all his money and assets. However, when he discovers that some shares he had given to Lyn for their wedding are now worth a small fortune, he tries to charm her. Andrewartha told an Inside Soap reporter, "Lyn's on to him right away – she's learned from the past." The actress also said that there would be "turbulent time ahead" for Lyn and Steph, explaining that Steph often finds that Lyn "barrels in" to fix things quickly without thinking of the consequences. Andrewartha made a guest appearance from 15 November 2017, as Lyn returns to Erinsborough to reveal that she is Steph's mystery investor in the Wellness Centre.

Two years later, Andrewartha reprised the role for a guest appearance airing from 28 August 2019. Lyn returns to Erinsborough to carry out interviews for The Flametree Retreat. Upon learning that Paul is engaged, Lyn decides to warn his fiancée Terese Willis (Rebekah Elmaloglou) not to marry him. Her advice is similar to that of Paul's former wife Gail Lewis (Fiona Corke) the previous week. When Paul confronts Lyn, she tells him to let Terese go if he loves her, while he accuses Lyn of being jealous.

Following Andrewartha's death in July 2024, executive producer Jason Herbison revealed in a 10 News First interview that he had planned for Lyn to make another return to the series, and intended to pay tribute to the character in the future.

== Storylines ==
=== 1999–2006 ===
Lyn and her family move into Ramsay Street just minutes after the Martin family leave. Despite trying to be polite, Lyn manages to insult her new neighbours. However, she finds a good friend in Susan Kennedy (Jackie Woodburne) when their husbands become rivals. Lyn finds work in a hair salon and she briefly becomes a Beauty Tree Saleswoman. Gino Esposito (Shane McNamara) takes over the salon and despite sacking Lyn, they become friends. Lyn and Joe's son Jack (Jay Bunyan) moves in and Lyn's aunt, Valda (Joan Sydney) makes a brief visit. Felicity and Michelle both leave for New York and Lyn falls pregnant. While watching home movies, Lyn discovers that Valda is her mother. She and Valda later go to meet her real father, Charlie (Cliff Ellen). Lyn gives birth to Oscar (Ingo Dammer-Smith). She initially suffers from postnatal depression after the birth. Lyn applies to be on the home make-over show, Making Mansions, but she is unhappy when the show portrays her family in a negative light.

Joe goes to Bendigo to care for his injured brother and father and Lyn sets up a book club with Susan and Liljana Bishop (Marcella Russo). Tom Scully (Andrew Larkins) arrives in town and Lyn becomes jealous of his growing relationship with Susan. She admits to Tom that she was once in love with him. Lyn goes to join Joe in Bendigo for a few weeks and on her return she reveals that her marriage is over. Charlie dies and Jack leaves. Lyn becomes a life coach and meets Andy Tanner (Craig Beamer). He leaves his wife for her, but Lyn ends their romance, when she discovers Andy has children. Janelle Timmins (Nell Feeney) and her children move in with Lyn and Oscar. Lyn receives attention from Bobby Hoyland (Andrew McFarlane), but she discovers that he is also dating Susan and Janelle. Lyn then begins a relationship with Joe Mangel (Mark Little). He buys her a dog, Bouncer 5. They get engaged, but Joe leaves to help out on his son's farm.

Lyn begins working as a personal assistant to Paul Robinson (Stefan Dennis) and she is sacked by Gino. Lyn dotes on her new grandson, Charlie (Jacob Brito). Paul discovers that he is being sued for copyright infringement after he invests in a product Steph designed and he passes the blame onto Lyn. Lyn sells her home and moves in with Paul, they then begin a relationship and get engaged. Shortly after they marry, Paul tells Lyn that he will break her heart and he leaves and returns home. Lyn is devastated and she and Oscar move to Shelly Bay.

=== 2008–2019 ===
Lyn and Rebecca fight on Ramsay Street (2009)

Two years later, Lyn returns to Erinsborough to visit Steph and admits that she is blackmailing Paul over his affair with Kirsten Gannon (Nikola Dubois). She tells Steph that she had been struggling with depression and she fears going bankrupt. Lyn meets Paul's fiancée, Rebecca Napier (Jane Hall), and she tells Susan that Paul is cheating on her. Susan tells Rebecca about Paul's affair and Lyn goes back to Shelly Bay. Lyn returns to Erinsborough on Paul and Rebecca's wedding day, where she interrupts the ceremony to announce that she is still married to Paul. Lyn and Rebecca have a catfight in the street. Lyn asks Paul for money in exchange for a divorce. Lyn decides to stay and gets Steph to buy their old home. She then buys Harold's Store and begins competing with Rebecca and her business, Charlie's.

Paul hires Lyn to work for his newspaper's gossip column. When she prints a story about Libby Kennedy (Kym Valentine), Susan is shocked and angry at her friend. Lyn accidentally gives the Deb Ball attendees food poisoning and she is fined $2000 and Harold's Store is closed temporarily. Lyn and Rebecca compete in a Christmas competition and Lyn wins. She then watches Paul marry Rebecca and she tells Susan that she still loves Paul. Summer Hoyland (Jordy Lucas) returns from boarding school and Lyn invites her to move in. Lyn is surprised when Steph announces that she is back with Toadfish Rebecchi (Ryan Moloney) and that she is pregnant. Steph later tells her that the relationship is a cover up because she pregnant with Daniel Fitzgerald's (Brett Tucker) baby. Lyn goes on a date with Terry Kearney (Peter Moon). Terry later asks Lyn to come on a cruise with him for six months, but she turns him down.

Steph's secret is revealed and it splits the Kennedy and Scully families. Lyn offers Rebecca support after news of Paul's affair is revealed. Lyn is devastated when Steph gives her baby to Dan. Lyn worries that Steph is suffering from post-natal depression and tries to stage an intervention, but Steph just walks out. Lyn then asks Libby to help. Steph accidentally kills Ringo Brown (Sam Clark) and she is sent to prison. She later decides to appeal Steph's sentence and she hires Tim Collins (Ben Anderson). Lyn asks Paul for a loan, but he refuses to give it to her and she decides to renew her house insurance and set fire to the house with some broken Christmas tree lights. She changes her mind, but Summer puts them on and a fire breaks out. Lyn is devastated to see the damage to the house and she and Summer move in with the Williams family. Lyn tells Summer that the insurance company will not pay out. Summer introduces her to Jim Dolan (Scott Parameter) and he agrees to rebuild the house. Jim tells Lyn that he will be happy to show her round the building work sometime. Lyn is not happy to discover that Summer has confided in Susan about her problems and she feels like she is losing her. Lyn manages to make things up with Summer and they briefly move in with the Kennedys, before returning to their rebuilt home.

Lyn allows Kyle Canning (Chris Milligan) to move in after he helps out around the house. Lyn allows Sophie Ramsay (Kaiya Jones) to look after Charlie and she is devastated when he goes missing. After he is found, Lyn blames Sophie, but she later apologises to her, after Paul has a go at her. Lyn tells Summer that Steph has been moved to an open prison in Bendigo and that they are moving to be closer to her. Lyn attends a farewell party for her and Summer and she says goodbye to Susan. Just as they are driving out of Ramsay Street, Andrew stops the car and tells Summer he loves her. She then tells Lyn that she is not leaving. Lyn tries to get Summer to change her mind, but she does not and Lyn and Charlie then leave for Bendigo without her.

Almost five years later, Lyn returns to Erinsborough after receiving a phone call from Sonya Rebecchi (Eve Morey), who believes Steph needs more people on her side to fight the adoption of her son Charlie. Lyn learns that Steph was in a relationship with her nurse Belinda Bell (Nikki Shiels), and Steph explains that she did not tell her as she did not want to get Belinda into trouble. Lyn promises to support Steph in her fight against the adoption. Lyn admits to Susan that she struggles with an empty house, as Oscar spends most of his time on the farm with Joe. Paul apologises to Lyn for making life hard for Steph following her return, and she accepts. However, she soon learns that Paul tried to gaslight Steph. When he later attempts to seduce Lyn in a bid to get valuable shares he bought for her as a wedding present, she realises what he is doing and ridicules him, revealing she gave the shares to Steph. Lyn tries to talk Steph out of going into business with Paul. She later brings Charlie to Erinsborough without Max's permission, not realising she is breaking the law by bringing Steph and Charlie back together. Lyn tries to fix her mistake by keeping Charlie from finding out about Steph, but Jimmy Williams (Darcy Tadich) accidentally tells him. After talking to Steph to try to understand her illness, Charlie decides not to tell Max he has seen her, and Lyn takes him home.

A couple of weeks later, Charlie runs away from Bendigo and catches the train to Erinsborough to see Steph again. Lyn turns up to collect him, but she and Steph take Charlie to spend some time with Jimmy. Charlie's stepmother Philippa Hoyland (Wendy Bos) also comes to Ramsay Street, after noticing Charlie's phone location is in Erinsborough. Lyn explains to Philippa that Steph plans to go into business with Paul, despite his attempts to gaslight her, giving Philippa ammunition for the upcoming adoption hearing. Steph later tells Lyn that she is not giving up her fight for Charlie.

Lyn returns to Erinsborough as Steph learns Lyn is her mystery investor in her wellness centre. Lyn explains that she sold her café in Bendigo to allow her to invest, and argues with Steph that the centre has potential to make a big profit if they change it to a health retreat. She plans to be a hands-off partner once everything is sorted. Lyn also tells Susan that she is only here to help and make sure Steph is okay. Steph later asks Lyn to be a silent partner and not meddle. Lyn meets Steph's partner Jack Callahan (Andrew Morley) and she tells Steph that she really likes him. Days later, Lyn helps Steph prepare for the centre's launch, which is successful. During another visit, Lyn breaks down in tears and explains to Amy Williams (Zoe Cramond) that Oscar wants to live with Joe and she does not know what to do with herself. Steph then decides that she will spend Christmas in Bendigo with her, Oscar and Joe.

Two years later, Lyn enters Number 22 just as Paul and his fiancée Terese Willis are discussing their upcoming wedding. She jokes that she and Paul are still married, before taking a photo of Paul's horrified expression. Lyn explains that she is in town to conduct interviews for the retreat. She later warns Terese that she is making a huge mistake in marrying Paul. When Paul confronts her, she tells him that he is the reason all his marriages failed and if he really loves Terese, he will end their engagement. Paul then accuses her of wanting him back. Lyn tells Sheila Canning (Colette Mann) that Paul's luck is about to run out. She, Rebecca and Paul's second wife Gail later ambush Terese at the spa and try one last time to convince her not to marry Paul. They realise that Terese will not change her mind, and after a drink together, Lyn leaves for Bendigo.

== Reception ==
Jackie Brygel of the Herald Sun praised the character for putting up with Joe, writing "You've just got to love and admire a woman like Lyn Scully. After all, this is a person who manages to put up with being married to a completely insensitive fellow by the name of Joe, a bloke who could easily take out the prize for Most Tactless Man on a Prime-Time Soapie." Brygel later branded Lyn "She With The Leopard Print Fetish".

After scenes involving the character fighting with Rebecca aired, Darren Rowe of entertainment website Digital Spy praised the scenes and branding it "one of the best episodes of 2009". Also stating: "It is a classic scene and quite simply Neighbours at its absolute best!". A critic for the Daily Record bemoaned the character's personality change, writing "Lyn Scully used to be the nicest, sweetest-natured person you could ever wish to meet. But now she's turned into a bit of a demon who will stop at nothing to make Rebecca and Paul's lives a misery. She's at it again this week. You'd think she'd just be happy that she persuaded Elle to sell Harold's Store to her at a bargain price, but oh no. Instead, she's determined to bring Charlie's Bar – and consequently Rebecca – to its knees by using underhand methods to steal its customers. Steph, always the voice of reason in Erinsborough, gives her mother a good talking-to – and about time too."

In 2010 to celebrate Neighbours' 25th anniversary Sky, a British satellite broadcasting company profiled 25 characters of which they believed were the most memorable in the series history. Lyn is on the list and they make light of how her interfering ways pushed her family away, stating: "Hairdresser by day and low-quality mother by night, Lyn has spent much of the last decade pestering daughter Steph, what with the rest of her family having fled. Joe sensibly left Lyn (well, the actor was sacked), and Lyn has since remarried Paul, presumably as some kind of karmic punishment for all his misdeeds over the years. Having become good again, Paul escaped her clutches, but Lyn still rattles around. Say what you like about her: she's got staying power."

Ruth Deller of entertainment website Lowculture criticised Lyn during her monthly review on the popularity of soap opera characters, she branded her 2009 return as unsuccessful, stating: "This is the most shoe-horned in and unwanted return in the soap for some time. There's no place for Lyn here anymore. If they want to replace Miranda, they could introduce a new couple/family rather than bringing back Lyn. She appears to have completely forgotten about poor Oscar as well, not to mention having turned into even more of a deranged harpy than she was the first time round. Bad, bad storyliners."

In June 2011, Kevin O'Sullivan of the Daily Mirror said farewell to Lyn in a feature on her departure. He branded her a "long-suffering stalwart who reached the end of her tether with Ramsay Street melodrama" and said he could not blame her for packing her bags and leaving. He explained "In just a few ludicrously eventful months she has been blackmailed by her former lover Paul Robinson, sobbed in court as her drunk- driver daughter Steph was jailed for killing Ringo – and lost her home when it went up in flames. No wonder she decided to quit town." Lyn was placed at number thirty on the Huffpost's "35 greatest Neighbours characters of all time" feature. Journalist Adam Beresford described Lyn as having transformed from "matriarch of the lively Scully clan" to a more fun incarnation of the character after Paul jilted her. He added that "Lyn became a recurring thorn in his side, gleefully twisting the knife at every given opportunity."
