= Dianna Fuemana =

New Zealand Pacific writer, director and performer

Dianna Fuemana (born 1973) is a New Zealand writer, director and performer. She writes for theatre and screen. Her solo play Mapaki was the first that brought a New Zealand-born Niue perspective to the professional stage. In 2008 Fuemana won the Pacific Innovation and Excellence Award, at the Creative New Zealand Arts Pasifika Awards. Fuemana was one of nine women writer-directors of the 2019 feature film Vai.

== Biography ==
Dianna Fuemana was born in New Zealand in 1973 and is one of seven children. Her mother is American Samoan and her father Togavale is Niuean. She is a cousin of singer Pauly Fuemana.

When she was a child she acted in church plays in her community. She went to Henderson High School in Auckland. During her time there, she attended a short course in performing arts run by Cath Cardiff and Jay Laga'aia. In 2005 she graduated with honours with a Master of Creativity and Performing Arts from Auckland University.

== Career ==
In 1997, Fuemana was one of three actors in the play Frangipani Perfume written by Makerita Urale.

Two years later, Fuemana wrote and performed in her own play, a solo show called Mapaki. For this she was nominated at the Chapman Tripp Theatre Awards for Outstanding New Writer and Best Upcoming Actress of the Year. After being performed in New Zealand Mapaki toured across the United States and in Athens, Greece. Fuemana's father wrote the song that opens her play Mapaki. Her father died in 2000 and she dedicated the Auckland season of Mapaki to him.

Feumana had a residency in 2006 at the Pangea World Theater in Minneapolis, USA. During that time she wrote the play Falemalma.

Her screen work includes writing and directing the short film Sunday Fun Day, which premiered at the New Zealand International Film Festival and includes the perspective of a transgender teenager and a solo mother. She says of Sunday Fun Day:

This story came from the feeling of "vulnerability," as a mother raising teens. From my experience, teens don’t really understand vulnerability from a mother’s perspective. We have a load of films in New Zealand that focus on the child’s perspective but not from the strength and humor of a mother’s.

Sunday Funday was screened at ImagineNATIVE Film Festival in 2017 and won an award.

Fuemana was one of nine writer-directors on the New Zealand Pacific Island feature film Vai released in 2019. In 2023 the film she co-wrote Mysterious Ways was released in New Zealand.

== Plays ==
- 1999 - Mapaki - writer and performer
- 2001 - Jingle Bells - writer
- 2004 - The Packer - writer. Presentations include New Zealand, Australia, Edinburgh Fringe Festival
- 2005 - My Mother Dreaming - writer
- 2006 - Falemalama - writer
- 2011 - Birds - writer. First performed 29 April 2011 at the Nuie Arts and Cultural Festival, directed by Fuemana and performed by Ali Foa'i.

== Screen ==
- 2017 - Sunday Fun Day - short film - writer and director
- 2019 - Vai - (2019) - film - writer/director - made in sections this film is also directed by eight other Pasifika women filmmakers: Sharon and Nicole Whippy, Becs Arahanga, Amberley Jo Aumua, Matasila Freshwater, Mīria George, 'Ofa-ki Guttenbeil-Likiliki and Marina Alofagia McCartney.
- 2023 - Mysterious Ways - feature film - co-writer
- Interrogation - TV - writer of episodes
- Good Hands - TV - writer of episodes

== Awards and residencies ==
In 2008 Feumana was awarded the Pacific Innovation and Excellence Award by Creative New Zealand in the Pasifika Arts Awards. Sunday Funday won the ImagineNATIVE Film and Media Arts Festival Sun Jury Prize in 2017.

== Personal ==
Fuemana has three children: a son and daughter from her first marriage, and a daughter with actor Jay Ryan.
