= Joe Scully =

- Neighbours character
- Portrayed by: Shane Connor
- Duration: 1999–2004
- First appearance: 20 October 1999
- Last appearance: 27 February 2004
- Introduced by: Stanley Walsh
In-universe information
- Occupation: Builder; Truck driver; Taxi driver; Farmer
- Father: Pat Scully
- Brothers: Mick Scully; Tom Scully
- Wife: Lyn Scully (1978–2004)
- Sons: Jack Scully; Oscar Scully
- Daughters: Stephanie Scully; Felicity Scully; Michelle Scully
- Grandsons: Charlie Hoyland; Adam Fitzgerald; Boyd Hoyland (step)
- Granddaughters: Summer Hoyland (step)

Joe Scully is a fictional character from the Australian soap opera Neighbours, played by Shane Connor. He made his first appearance during the episode broadcast on 20 October 1999, along with his family.

== Development ==
In October 1999, the five-strong Scully family were introduced to Neighbours, replacing the departing Martin family. The Scullys were the first new family to be introduced to the show since Ruth Wilkinson (Ailsa Piper) arrived with her twins in 1996. Actor Shane Connor was cast as Joe Scully, the patriarch of the family in July 1999. He had previously made a guest appearance in the show as Phil Hoffman in 1991. Connor was invited to audition for the role of Joe by the show's producers, and he accepted when he learned that there was a chance to work with Janet Andrewartha, who was cast as Joe's wife Lyn Scully. The character of Joe also offered Connor a chance to play someone other than a bad guy or "a man on the verge." Connor was contracted with Neighbours for three years, with 12-month options. He began filming with his on-screen family in August 1999. Connor admitted that he did not know how popular Neighbours was until his first day of filming on the Ramsay Street set, where around 40 people came to watch the shoot. He likened it to "the holy pilgrimage." He made his first appearance as Joe on 20 October. Connor's contract was renewed several times during his stay on the show.

Simon Yeaman of The Advertiser described Joe as a "fast-living building businessman", whose family were "set to stir things up in Ramsay St with their boisterous antics." Connor told Yeaman that the family had "a much different energy" to the other characters on the street. He continued: "They (his daughters) get stuck into the street pretty quickly into the boys I mean." Connor was surprised when Yeaman informed him that his character was billed as a womaniser, who flirts with "every woman who crosses his path... he can't help himself". He said that he had yet to have any scenes featuring that aspect of Joe's personality, and thought it would be pointless with the younger "spunks" in the cast, adding "you wouldn't want to get the old man into it." Of Joe, Connor said, "Basically, Joe's the only male there when you want something stirred up. Everyone else is so easy to get along with. He's the only one who isn't so easy to get along with. Well, he is, as long as you don't get on the wrong side of him." Connor explained that Joe was not one for caring what others thought and he thought that someone like Joe, who could not care less, would stir up the street. Connor added, "He doesn't fit into the landscape easily, and neither do I." Joe owns his own building business and "lives on the edge".

In 2003, Connor had his contract terminated by Grundy Television and he was dismissed from the show after he developed an amphetamine problem, which caused him to clash with cast members and disrupt filming. Joe made an off-screen exit in early 2004, leaving Erinsborough to take care of his injured father in Bendigo. Connor later filed an unfair dismissal claim against Grundy and sued them for nine months of lost earnings ($200,000). He admitted that he had suffered from "amphetamine hangovers", but he denied that he had been aggressive. He also claimed that Andrewartha did not like him and was behind most of the complaints to producers. Connor later won his case and Grundy Television were ordered to pay him more than $230,000.

In 2023, following her brief return to the series, Kate Keltie, who plays Joe's daughter Michelle, disclosed in a behind the scenes video that storyliners had decided that Joe had died, although his fate was not mentioned on-screen.

== Storylines ==
Joe moves to Ramsay Street with his wife, Lyn Scully, and their three daughters – Felicity Scully, Michelle Scully and Stephanie Scully. Their son, Jack Scully, joins them later. Joe starts as an apprentice in the building trade, working his way up to forming his own construction company, Ozbuilt.

Lyn decides she wants another baby, and Oscar Scully is born. Soon after the birth of Oscar, Joe's father and brother are hospitalised following a tractor accident. Joe leaves Ramsay Street to take care of his family and his father's farm. Lyn later joins Joe for a short period. However, she wants to remain in Ramsay Street, and decides she doesn't love him anymore. They divorce, with Lyn remaining in Ramsay Street. Oscar later joins Joe on the family farm.

== Reception ==
When Joe quit coaching the cricket team, Jackie Brygel of the Herald Sun noted that "the usually happy chappie Joe shocks one and all" with his decision. Brygel later became critical of the character, calling him "a completely insensitive fellow" and writing that he was "a bloke who could easily take out the prize for Most Tactless Man on a Prime-Time Soapie. And, believe us, there are many contenders." She also branded him "never-jovial Joe". Of Joe, Virgin Media said "Ramsay Street's Joe Scully had his hands full with tearaway teen kids, Steph, Flick, Michelle and Jack. If he was not trying to put an end to Flick's latest romance, he was feuding with his neighbour, Karl Kennedy." Andrew Mercado, author of Super Aussie Soaps, describes Joe as being a "permanently missing-in-action" character following his abrupt departure. The BBC said Joe's most notable moment was "Delivering a baby in a bushfire."
