= Kevin Summers =

Australian actor

Kevin Summers is an Australian actor and playwright.

== Career ==
=== Television ===
Summers' is best known for his multiple character roles in numerous soap operas and serials. His credits include: Cop Shop as Ralph Finley (1978), Worst Day of my Life, The Sullivans, Holiday Island (1981), Phoenix, Stingers, Blue Heelers in 5 different roles, Neighbours Alex Carter (1986)/Cliff Browning (1998)/Det Sgt. Goldstein (2001)/Detective Alec Skinner (2003–2010) and Prisoner Det Sgt. Parsons (1979-1980/Lou Reynolds (1982)/Reverent Alpha Certauri (1983)/(1984/85, appeared in 21 episodes) as Ben Fulbright,

=== Theatre ===
Summers' theatre work includes the role of Lionel Murphy in Conspiracy, a return season of Ron Blair's one man piece The Christian Brothers, and St Thomas in The Trial of Judas Iscariot. He performed Neil LaBute's solo work, "Wrecks" in 2014. Recently at 45 Downstairs, Melbourne, as Uncle Ben in Death of a Salesman and as Saul in True West.

=== Playwright ===
Summers' own plays include:

- The Empty Say, (La Mama)
- Blamey, (Chapel off Chapel)
- Amendment to Terror, (La Mama)
- Salvation Jane, (Chapel off Chapel)
- Patient 12 (La Mama), published by Currency Press. Also in Amarillo, Texas.
- Snub (on Snub Pollard), (St Martins Theatre)
- The Right Words on the Day, (La Mama)

His agent is Fabienne Parr Management (Melb.)

== Personal life ==
Summers has been married to Jo for over 22 years and they have a dog named Bo. He is also an uncle, a godfather and a grand uncle. He plays golf off single figures. Summers is also a fan of the Western Bulldogs. Australian and international politics is an enduring interest. He has written on various subjects for The Age, Sydney Morning Herald, The West Australian, The Canberra Times and magazines including Eureka Street, The Big Issue, National Bank News and Racetrack. He is a past winner of the My Brother Jack short story competition.
