= Lucia Smyrk =

Australian actress

- Occupations: Actress, assistant director
- Years active: 2002–present
- Known for: Short Cuts (2002); Pirate Islands (2003); Neighbours (2003; 2012)
- Spouse: Nick Cody (m. February 2017)

Lucia Smyrk is an Australian actress and assistant director who has appeared in a number of Australian television series.

== Career ==
Smyrk's credits include teen television series Short Cuts playing Anna (2002), children's adventure series Pirate Islands as Carmen (2003), and long-running soap opera Neighbours as both Edwina Valdez (2003) and Evie Sullivan (2012).

She has made guest appearances in Blue Heelers, Last Man Standing, The Circuit, City Homicide, Twentysomething, Winners & Losers, Superwog, Wentworth, Utopia and 2016 web series The Wizards of Aus.

Smyrk appeared in 2018 drama comedy film The Merger, alongside her husband.

She has also featured in several television commercials for clients including Independence Australia, Terri Scheer Insurance, McCain Foods, Medibank Private, Coles Supermarkets and Jeans West.

== Personal life ==
Smyrk has been married to comedian Nick Cody since February 2017. They married on a beach on the Vietnamese island of Phú Quốc. The couple had their first child, a son, Charlie in 2019. Their second son Max, was born in 2021.

== Filmography ==
=== Film ===
Year	Title	Role	Notes
2018	The Merger	Troy's mum	

=== Television ===
Year	Title	Role	Notes
2002	Short Cuts	Anna Klopfer	26 episodes
2002; 2004	Blue Heelers	Cate Simmons / Caitlin Price	2 episodes
2003	Pirate Islands	Carmen	26 episodes
2003; 2012	Neighbours	Edwina Valdez / Evie Sullivan	13 episodes
2005	Last Man Standing	Ricki	1 episode
2009–2010	The Circuit	Constable Wilkes	3 episodes
2010	City Homicide	Monica Jones	1 episode
2011	Twentysomething	Bridie	1 episode
2013	Hartman's Solution	Dr Claire Bishop	Unaired pilot
2016	The Wizards of Aus	Elsa, Warrior Princess	Web series, 1 episode
2016	Winners & Losers	Hannah Cook	1 episode
2017	Superwog	Lisa	1 episode
2018	Wentworth	Reporter #1	1 episode
2019	Utopia	Moderator	1 episode
	Shadow Factory	Dingo	Web series

== Theatre ==
Year	Title	Role	Notes
	The Sound of Music	Maria	
	Yoga Fart	Amy	
	The Reunion	Constable	La Mama, Melbourne
2007	The Devil in Me	Various lead roles	Carlton Courthouse, Melbourne with La Mama
2016	Madwomen Monologues: Sucking the Marrow out of the Limelight and Other Mixed Metaphors	Lead role	Butterfly Club, Melbourne
2016	The Money		Prahran Town Hall for Melbourne Festival
	Peter Pan	Peter Pan	
	Who Stole the Sole	Tanya	Phunktional Productions
	The Wizard of Oz	Cowardly Lion	
	Love Drunk	Lee	Phunktional Productions
