= Shane McNamara =

Australian television and film actor (born 1956)

- Born: Australia
- Occupation: Television actor
- Years active: 1986-present
- Known for: Neighbours; Bananas in Pajamas

Shane McNamara is an Australian television and film actor who is best known for his many appearances in the recurring role of Gino Esposito in the Australian soap opera Neighbours.

McNamara played a character called 'Rat in a Hat' in the children's television show Bananas in Pyjamas (in both the original live-action series and CGI animated series). He has made numerous television appearances in other Australian series including Satisfaction, All Saints, Blue Heelers, Snobs, Water Rats and The Girl from Tomorrow.

In 2024, McNamara made a return to Neighbours.

== Filmography ==
Television
Year	Title	Role	Notes
2001-24	Neighbours	Gino Esposito	36 episodes
2023	Safe Home	Mr Merchant	1 episode
2019	Preacher	Good Samaritan	1 episode
2013	It's a Date	Alison's Dad	1 episode
2011-13	Bananas in Pyjamas	Rat in a Hat	10 episodes
2012	Australia on Trial	Charles Hotham	1 episode
2009	Rescue: Special Ops	Barry	1 episode
2008	City Homicide	Malcolm Lewis	1 episode
2008	Satisfaction	Garth	1 episode
2004	All Saints	Mr Cook	1 episode
2003	Snobs	Mr Sinclair	1 episode
2002	Blue Heelers	Chas	1 episode
1992-01	Bananas in Pyjamas	Rat in a Hat	250 episodes
2001	Crash Zone	Mr Moseley	3 episodes
2001	Child Star: The Shirley Temple Story	Dr Madsen	TV movie
1999	M.U.G.E.N		Video game
1999	Water Rats	Max Clark	1 episode
1997	Fallen Angels	Frank Josty	1 episode
1993-94	G.P	Cam Russell	3 episodes
1993	You and Me and Uncle Bob	Pound Manager	TV movie
1992	The Girl from Tomorrow	Policeman	TV movie
1991	The Girl from Tomorrow	Policeman	TV series
1991	A Country Practice	Dezzy	1 episode
1990	All the Rivers Run II	Riley	2 episodes
1989	E Street	Norman Keating	1 episode
1989	Home and Away	Brucie	1 episode
1987	Sons and Daughters	Mr Bird	1 episode
1987	Rafferty's Rules	Mr Jones	1 episode
1986	A Fortunate Life		1 episode

Film
Year	Title	Role	Notes
2002	Hetty	Michael Riley	
2002	Dirty Deeds	US Airport Official	
1993	The Custodian	Antonavitch	
1992	Turtle Beach	Hotel Waiter	
1990	Blood Oath	Major Roberts Aide	
