= Jay Ryan (actor) =

New Zealand actor

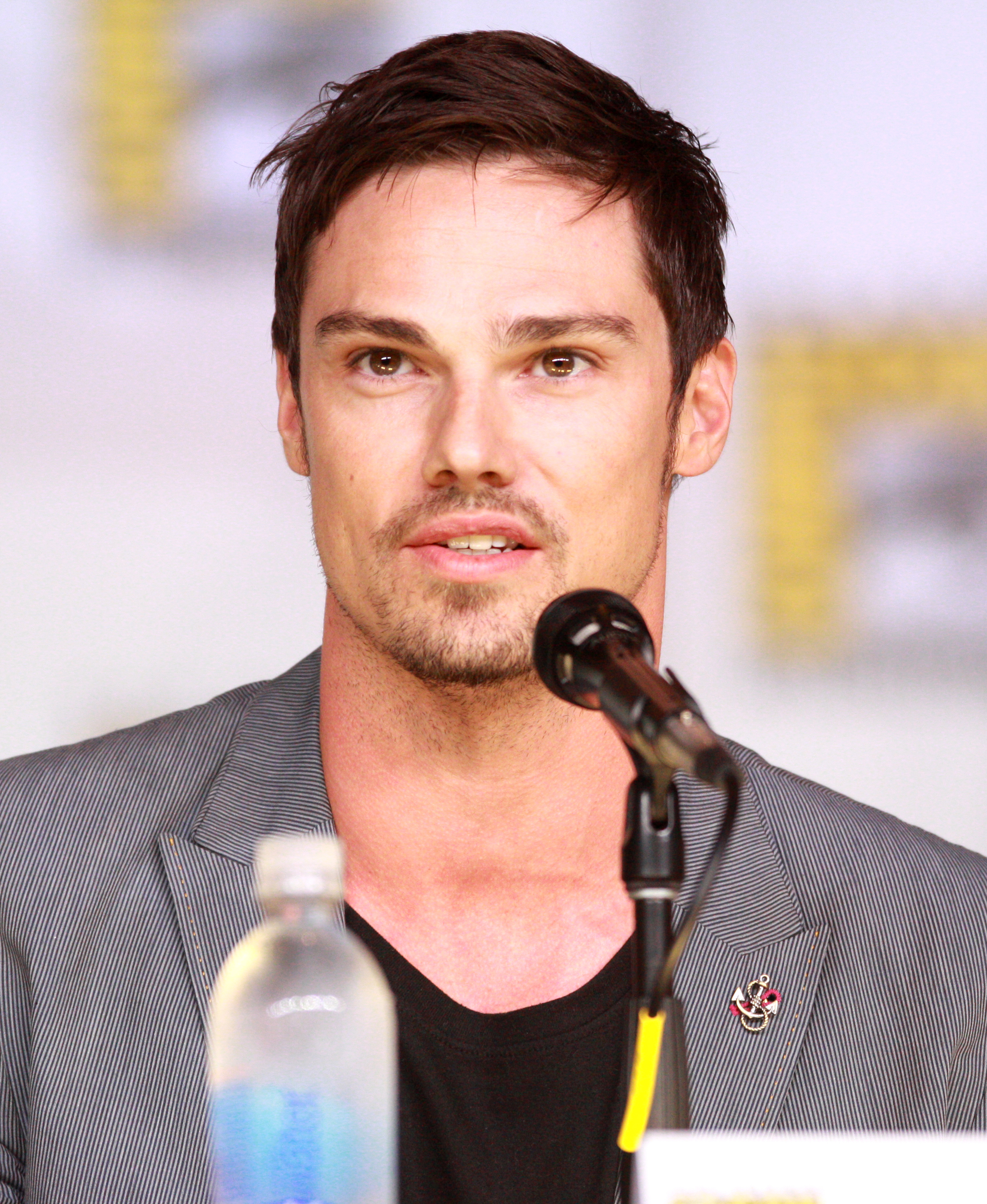
- Ryan at the 2013 San Diego Comic-Con
- Born: Jay Bunyan; Auckland, New Zealand
- Other name: Jay Ryan
- Citizenship: New Zealand; Canada (since 2023)
- Occupation: Actor
- Years active: 1991–present
- Spouse: Dianna Fuemana
- Children: 1

Jay Ryan (born Jay Bunyan) is a New Zealand actor. He is best known for his roles as Jack Scully in Neighbours (2002–2005), Seaman Billy 'Spider' Webb in Sea Patrol (2007–2009), Kevin in Go Girls (2009–2012), Vincent Keller in Beauty & the Beast (2012–2016), Detective Ben Wesley in Mary Kills People (2017–2019) and Bobby in Creamerie (2021–2023). He also played major roles in Scrublands (2023), Territory (2024), and Dustfall. Ryan made his feature film breakthrough playing adult Ben Hanscom in It Chapter Two (2019), a sequel to the 2017 horror film It, based on the 1986 novel of the same name.

== Career ==
Under the name Jay Bunyan, he appeared as Glen in Scallywag Pirates (2000) and had a minor role in Xena: Warrior Princess. He is known for his portrayal of Jack Scully in the Australian soap opera Neighbours from late 2002 until January 2005.

From 2007 until 2009, Ryan played Seaman William "Billy" Webb a.k.a. "Spider" in the popular Australian drama, Sea Patrol.

In live theatre, Ryan has shared the stage with John Cleese, and toured internationally with The Packer, an acclaimed solo show written by NZ/Niuean playwright Dianna Fuemana.

From 2009 to 2012, Ryan played Kevin in the New Zealand comedy/drama series Go Girls. In 2011, he joined the cast of the Australian comedy/drama series Offspring. Also in 2011, Ryan guest-starred in the American science-fiction series Terra Nova, playing a murderer.

In 2012 Ryan was cast as the male lead in CW's Beauty & the Beast pilot.

Ryan starred as the adult Ben Hanscom in the 2019 horror film It Chapter Two, the sequel to It (2017).

Ryan has played major roles in several Australian TV drama series in the 2020s, including the 2023 Stan Original series Scrublands and Netflix's 2025 drama Territory. In 2026 he starred in the ABC Television series Dustfall.

== Personal life ==
Ryan was born Jay Bunyan. He is of English, Welsh, and Irish descent. He has a daughter with his wife, the playwright and director Dianna Fuemana.

He spent a lot of time in Los Angeles and in Canada before the COVID-19 pandemic, and he became a naturalised citizen of Canada. He and his family moved back to New Zealand during the pandemic, and were still there in June 2023.

== Filmography ==
=== Film ===
Year	Title	Role	Notes
2010	Lou	Cosmo	
2019	It Chapter Two	Ben Hanscom	Shared role with Jeremy Ray Taylor
2020	The Furnace	Shaw	
2021	Together Forever Tea	Matt Slater	TV Movie
2022	Muru	Gallagher	
2025	Wolf Creek: Legacy	TBA	

=== Television ===
Year	Title	Role	Notes
1998	Young Hercules	Cadet	Episode: "Keeping Up with the Jasons"
1999	Xena: Warrior Princess	Zortis (uncredited)	Episode: "Fallen Angel"
2002	The Tribe	Blue (uncredited)	2 episodes
2002	Being Eve	Sam Hooper	Series regular; 13 episodes
2002	Superfire	Dennis	Television film
2002–2005	Neighbours	Jack Scully	Series regular (as Jay Bunyan)
2003	You Wish!	Charles	Television film
2005	Interrogation	Police Constable Dean Salmon	Guest role; 3 episodes
2007–2009	Sea Patrol	Seaman Billy "Spider" Webb	Series regular; 39 episodes
2009–2012	Go Girls	Kevin	Series regular; 46 episodes
2010	Legend of the Seeker	Alastair	Episode: "Eternity"
2011	Offspring	Fraser King	6 episodes
2011	Terra Nova	Curran	3 episodes
2012–2016	Beauty & the Beast	Vincent Keller / Alistair in S2 episode set in 1854	Series regular
2013	Top of the Lake	Mark Mitcham	Miniseries; 6 episodes
2017–2019	Mary Kills People	Detective Ben Wesley	Series regular
2018	Fighting Season	Sgt Sean Collins	Miniseries; 6 episodes
2021	Together Forever Tea	Matt Slater	Television film
2021	My Life Is Murder	Joe Gorman	Episode: "Crushed Dreams"
2021–2023	Creamerie	Bobby	Series regular
2023	No Escape	Aaron	7 episodes
2023	Scrublands	Byron Swift	Miniseries; 4 episodes
2024	Territory	Campbell Miller	6 episodes
2025–2026	North of North	Alistair	
2025	Law & Order Toronto: Criminal Intent	Miles Graff	1 episode
2025	The Ridge	Ewan	Main Role
2026	Dustfall	Simon Prendergast	TV series

== Awards ==
Year	Award	Work	Result
2003	Logie Award for Most Popular New Male Talent	Neighbours	Nominated
2014	Equity Ensemble Award for Outstanding Performance by an Ensemble in a Miniseries or Telemovie	Top of the Lake	Won
