= Janet Andrewartha =

Australian actress (1951–2024)

- Born: 16 September 1951; Melbourne, Victoria, Australia
- Died: 26 July 2024 (aged 72); Melbourne, Victoria, Australia
- Occupation: Actress
- Years active: 1979–2024
- Known for: Neighbours as Lyn Scully; Prisoner as Rebecca "Reb" Kean

Janet Andrewartha (16 September 1951 – 26 July 2024) was an Australian television and theatre actress and director and singer. Andrewartha began her career as a high school music teacher before attending drama school. She graduated in 1979 and began securing television and theatre roles.

Andrewartha's most significant roles were in Australian television series, most prominently Rebecca "Reb" Kean in Prisoner and Lyn Scully in the soap opera Neighbours.

Outside of television, she actively pursued a theatre career, starting in the early 1980s and performing for over four decades, working in numerous productions with the Melbourne Theatre Company, Playbox Theatre Company and numerous others.

== Early life ==
Andrewartha was born in Melbourne, Victoria. In her early life, Andrewartha did not plan to become an actress and worked as a music teacher. While she worked in a high school, the principal asked Andrewartha to stage an end of year musical with her year 10 classes. She knew nothing about theatre and was asked to study to aid the production. Andrewartha took a part-time drama course and after one year decided to quit teaching to pursue acting full-time. She attended a three-year drama school course at the National Theatre in Melbourne. Andrewartha graduated from the National Theatre in 1979.

== Career ==
=== Theatre ===
In 1981, Andrewartha toured her one-woman theatre show in Melbourne, titled Singing in the Raid. In 1982, she performed her show at the National Theatre. She played Iris in the production Framework at the Universal Theatre, in Fitzroy. In 1984, she took the role of Polly in the Victorian Arts Centre production of The Three-penny Opera.

In 1985, she took roles in Russell Street Theatre productions. She acted in Barry Dickins' Reservoir by Night, and in Shirley Gee's Never in My Lifetime, opposite Kevin Harrington.

Andrewartha continued working with the Melbourne Theatre Company on several productions, including a role in the Australian outing of Tom & Viv. For her portrayal of the role, Andrewartha won a leading actress accolade at the 1987 Green Room Awards. In 1988, she took the role of Great Aunt Dinah in Tristram Shandy, and Joan in Dinkum Assorted.

In 1991, she played Sandra in another Melbourne Theatre Company production, Sunday Lunch; she also took the lead role of investigative journalist Jean in Michael Gurr's Sex Diary of an Infidel. During the 1992 season, Andrewartha played the lead role of Emilia in Othello. In 1993, she took a role playing barmaid Breda in A Happy and Holy Occasion and later played Lisa in The Garden of Granddaughters. Andrewartha played Caroline in another play by Gurr, titled Underwear, Perfume and Crash Helmet, which debuted in 1994. In the 1995 season she took the role of Mary Margaret in Good Works. Her 1997 theatre roles included a part in the Sydney Theatre Company collaboration Jerusalem, and Isola in Navigating. In 1998, she secured the role in Hotel Sorrento, and she later played Liz in Rising Fish Prayer. That year, Andrewartha also directed a theatre production titled Neon Angel.

=== Television ===
Although Andrewartha had an extensive career in theatre, she starting appearing in television roles in the early 1980s, with a role in court drama Carson's Law. From 1990 until 1991, she appeared in drama serial Embassy as Marion Stewart, the strong wife of an Australian ambassador. For her role of Marion, she was nominated an Australian Film Institute Award for "Best Performance by an Actress in a Leading Role in a Television Drama" at the 1991 Australian Film Institute Awards. Despite her success, Andrewartha was not asked to return for the show's last series, and she resumed her work with the Melbourne Theatre Company.

She became known internationally for her television role in the drama series Prisoner, joining the cast in 1984 as rebellious biker Rebecca "Reb" Kean. Her character was written out of the series, after Andrewartha decided not to renew her contract and return to the stage. She reprised the role in June 1985.

In 1999, Andrewartha joined the cast of the soap opera Neighbours, playing the role of Lyn Scully. Andrewartha left the show in 2006, and immediately resumed working in theatre. In 2007, Andrewartha took a hiatus from acting while she helped care for her ill mother, until her death in January 2008. She also used the time off to help her daughter with her education. She later returned to Neighbours for a guest role in 2008, and once again in 2009, and remained with Neighbours for another two years. In 2011, Andrewartha decided to leave the series once again. She stated that she was only supposed to return in a guest role and ended up staying on. Andrewartha chose to leave to pursue other acting roles. The actress later reprised the role for further guest roles in 2016, 2017 and 2019.

In 2017, Andrewartha joined the cast of Seven Types of Ambiguity in the recurring role of Kathleen. Her most recent roles were in 2023 in the SBS drama miniseries Safe Home as Diana, and her last role was in 2024 Paramount+ thriller Fake as Kath Tovey.

== Death and tributes ==
Andrewartha died in her sleep in Melbourne, Australia on 26 July 2024 at the age of 72, within three months of receiving a cancer diagnosis.

Neighbours co-star and friend Jackie Woodburne paid tribute, saying she "was one of the finest actors of a generation. I will miss her every day". Stefan Dennis, Jason Herbison, Holly Valance and Carla Bonner who portrayed two of her on-screen daughters also paid tribute, as did casting director Jan Russ, Jane Hall and Lucinda Cowden.

Stefan Dennis said he was "so very upset to lose the lovely Janet. She truly was an exceptional actress who was a pleasure to work with and to be around. We will all miss you, dear girl."

== Filmography ==
=== Film ===
Year	Title	Role	Notes
1987	Ground Zero	New neighbour	Feature film
1995	Sticktoitiveness		Short film
1998	Amy	Singing receptionist	Feature film
	Ruthven	The Bride	

=== Television ===
Year	Title	Role	Notes
1979	Patrol Boat	Uncredited	TV series, guest role
1983	Carson's Law	Phoebe King	TV series, 1 episode
1983	Home	Bellamy	TV series, 1 episode
1984–1985	Prisoner	Reb Kean	TV series, 94 episodes
1989	This Man... This Woman	Pat	TV miniseries, 1 episode
1990–1991	Embassy	Marion Stewart	TV series, 25 episodes
1991; 1993	A Country Practice	Lisa Davis	TV series, 2 episodes
1995	Janus	Anna	TV series, 1 episode
1994–1995	Blue Heelers	Det. Bridget Ryan	TV series, 2 episodes
1997	State Coroner	Eileen Hardy	TV series, 1 episode
1998	Moby Dick	Ahab's wife (uncredited)	TV miniseries, episode 1
1999–2006, 2008–2011, 2016–2017, 2019	Neighbours	Lyn Scully	TV series, 1059 episodes
2017	Seven Types of Ambiguity	Kathleen	TV miniseries, 4 episodes
2021	Harrow	Mrs Peek	TV series, 1 episode
2023	Safe Home	Diana Thompson	TV miniseries, 4 episodes
2024	Fake	Kath Tovey	TV series: 1 episode (final role)

== Stage ==
=== As performer ===
Year	Title	Role	Notes
1981–1982	Singin' in the Raid		Forfeit Fondue Theatre, National Theatre, Melbourne; Solo cabaret show
	Once a Catholic		Melbourne Theatre Company (MTC)
1983	Ticka-Tocka-Linga		Victorian regional tour with Victorian State Opera & St Kilda Festival
	Love Letters	Melissa Gardner	Victorian Arts Centre
1983	Framework	Iris	Universal Theatre, Melbourne
1983	Lysistrata	Mhyrrine	Stork Theatre for Epidavros Summer Festival
1984	The Threepenny Opera	Christine Mahoney / Polly	Playhouse, Melbourne with MTC
1984	Pax Americana	The Ideal Woman / various roles	Playhouse, Melbourne with MTC
1984	The Curse of the Werewolf	Various roles	Playhouse, Melbourne with MTC
1985	Visions	The Maid	Russell Street Theatre, Melbourne with MTC
1985	Reservoir by Night	Lead female	Russell Street Theatre, Melbourne with MTC
1985	Never in My Lifetime	Tessie	Russell Street Theatre, Melbourne with MTC
1985	Breaking the Silence	Polya	Russell Street Theatre, Melbourne with MTC
1986	Tom & Viv	Vivienne Haigh-Wood	Russell Street Theatre, Melbourne with MTC
1986	Dead to the World	Rosa Hernandez	Russell Street Theatre, Melbourne with MTC
1987	The Three Musketeers	Mde Bonacueu / various roles	Playhouse, Melbourne with MTC
1987	A Soldier's Tale	Narrator	Victorian Arts Centre
1988	Tristram Shandy – Gent	Great Auntie Dinah / Bridget / Goody Coddling / German scholar	Russell Street Theatre, Melbourne with MTC
1988	Dinkum Assorted	Joan	Sydney Opera House with & STC & Playhouse, Melbourne with MTC
1991	Miss Saigon		Theatre Royal Drury Lane with Cameron Mackintosh
1991	Sunday Lunch	Sandra Van Der Vera	Russell Street Theatre, Melbourne with MTC
1992	Othello	Emilia	Playhouse, Melbourne with MTC
1992	Sex Diary of an Infidel	Jean	Malthouse Theatre, Melbourne with Playbox Theatre Company
1993	A Happy and Holy Occasion	Breda Mulcahy	Malthouse Theatre, Melbourne with Playbox Theatre Company
1993	The Garden of Granddaughters	Lisa	Malthouse Theatre, Melbourne, Her Majesty’s Theatre, Ballarat, Ford Theatre, Geelong, Monash University, Wharf Theatre, Sydney with Playbox Theatre Company & STC
1994	Underwear, Perfume and Crash Helmet	Caroline	Malthouse Theatre, Melbourne with Playbox Theatre Company
1995	Good Works	Mary Margaret	Malthouse Theatre, Melbourne with Playbox Theatre Company
1997	Jerusalem	Jocelyn / Maureen	Wharf Theatre with STC & Playbox Theatre Company
1997	Navigating	Isola	Suncorp Piazza, Brisbane with Queensland Theatre & Fairfax Studio, Melbourne with MTC
1998	Hotel Sorrento	Hilary	Malthouse Theatre, Melbourne with HIT Productions
1998	Rising Fish Prayer	Liz	Malthouse Theatre, Melbourne, Glen Street Theatre with Playbox Theatre Company
2004	Honour	Honor	Fairfax Studio, Melbourne with MTC
2007	All My Sons	Kate Keller	Playhouse, Melbourne with MTC
2012	Music	Margie	Fairfax Studio, Melbourne with MTC
2013	Other Desert Cities	Polly Wyeth	Playhouse, Brisbane with Black Swan State Theatre Company & Queensland Theatre

=== As director ===
Year	Title	Role	Notes
1996	Burning Time	Assistant Director	Malthouse Theatre, Melbourne with Playbox Theatre Company & Black Swan State Theatre Company
	Our Country’s Good	Director	National Theatre Drama School
	Don’s Party	Director	National Theatre Drama School
