= Running Man =

Running Man may refer to:

== Literature ==
- The Ballad of the Running Man, a 1961 novel by Shelley Smith
- The Running Man, a 1963 novel by Joan Carol Holly under the pseudonym J. Hunter Holly
- "The Running Man" (short story), a 1968 short story by Bill Pronzini
- The Running Man, a 1969 novel by W. A. Harbinson
- The Running Man (novel), a 1982 novel by Stephen King under the pseudonym Richard Bachman
- The Running Man, a 1998 musical by Cornelius Eady and Diedre Murray
- The Running Man (Bauer novel), a 2004 novel by Michael Gerard Bauer

== Film ==
- The Running Man (1963 film), a British drama
- The Running Man (1981 film), a Canadian television film
- Running Man, working title for the Australian film released as The City's Edge (1983)
- The Running Man (1987 film), an American dystopian action film loosely based on the Stephen King novel and starring Arnold Schwarzenegger
- Running Man (2013 film), a 2013 South Korean film
- Running Man (2015 film), a 2015 Chinese film
- The Running Man (2025 film), a dystopian thriller film based on the Stephen King novel, and the second adaptation of the novel.
- "Running Man", a short, appearing as a segment of the 1987 anime anthology film Neo Tokyo, also featured on an episode of Liquid Television

== Television ==
=== Episodes ===
- "Incident of the Running Man", a 1961 episode of Rawhide
- "The Running Man", a 1969 episode of Bonanza
- "The Running Man", a 1973 episode of Sutherland's Law
- "The Running Man", a 1976 episode of S.W.A.T. (1975)
- "The Running Man", a 2006 episode of Numbers
- "The Running Man", a 2007 episode of My Bride Is a Mermaid
- "The Running Man", a 2010 episode of Breakout (Canadian)
- "The Running Man", a 2018 episode of Cops
- "The Running Man", a 2018 episode of Step Up
- "The Running Man", a 2023 episode of Trigun Stampede

=== Shows ===
- Running Man (South Korean TV series), a South Korean variety show (since 2010)
  - Keep Running (TV program), a Chinese spin-off of the South Korean variety show, previously called Running Man China or Hurry Up, Brother
  - Running Man Philippines, a Filipino spin-off of the South Korean variety show
- Running Man (Taiwanese TV series), a Taiwanese television series

== Music ==
- Running Man Records, a record label
- "Running Man", a song by Hanson on the album The Walk
- "Running Man", a song by Al Stewart on the album 24 Carrots
- Running Man: Nike+ Original Run, a 2008 remix album

== People and fictional characters ==
- Another word for a "bagman" in organized crime
- Robert Garside (born 1967), the first person to run around the world, uses the alias "the Runningman"
- The Glico man, a famous advertisement in Osaka, Japan
- "Running Man" Mascot of AIM (AOL Instant Messenger)

== Symbols ==
- A standard symbol used on an exit sign
- Barred lambda, a symbol used in phonetic notation
- AOL Running Man, a logo used by America On-Line
- The "Running Man" semigraphics characters from Apple's MouseText, Unicode points U+1FBB2 and U+1FBB3

== Other uses ==
- Running man (dance)
- The Running Man (video game), a 1989 game based on the 1987 film
- The Running Man Nebula, a reflection nebula embedded in Sh2-279

== See also ==
- Running (disambiguation)
- Man (disambiguation)
- Men (disambiguation)
