= The Runners =

Runners or The Runners may refer to:

- Runners (band), an Australian band
- Runners (botany), part of a plant
- Runners (film), a British film starring James Fox
- The Runners (production duo), an American production duo
- "The Runners" (song), a 2016 song by the Naked and Famous
- The Runners (sculpture), a sculpture in Oklahoma
- The Runners (Urban Wall), a mural in Indiana, United States
- Runners, term for sneakers in Australia, Canada and Ireland

== See also ==
- Runner (disambiguation)
- The Runner (disambiguation)
- The Runners Four
