= Man Running =

Man Running may refer to:

- Man Running (novel), a 1948 novel by Selwyn Jepson
- Man Running (film), a 2018 Canadian drama film

== See also ==
- Running Man (disambiguation)
