= Hillbilly Moon =

Australian band

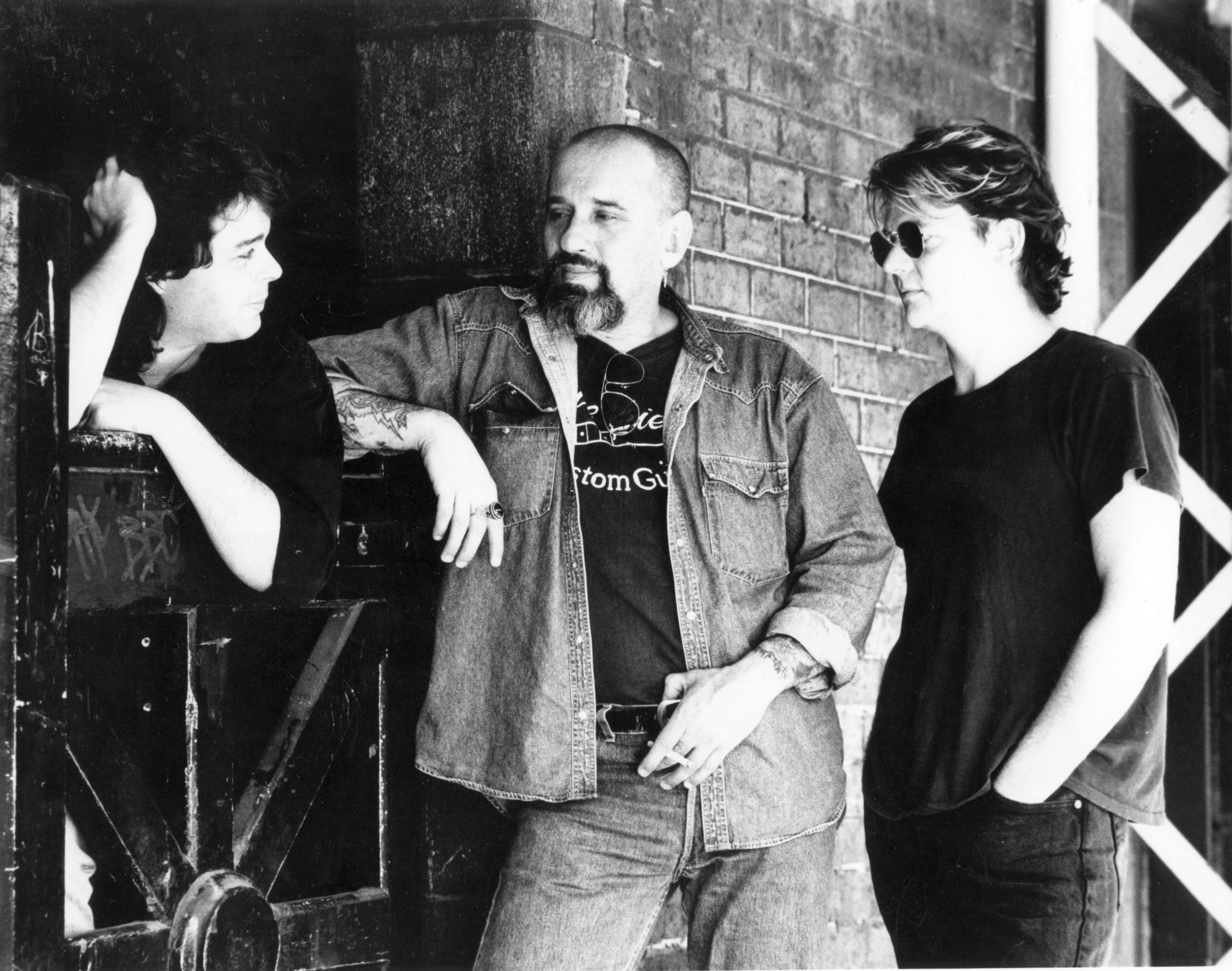
- Promo photo from 1994, L-R Peter Wells, Cletis Carr, Paul Norton

Background information
- Origin: Melbourne, Australia
- Genres: acoustic rock, country rock, Americana
- Years active: 1994–1997
- Labels: Pelican Records Australia, MDS
- Past members: see members list below

Hillbilly Moon began as a side-project for three established songwriter-musicians, Peter Wells, Paul Norton, and Cletis Carr, that quickly became a full-time touring and recording band.

== History ==
Formed in 1994, in Melbourne Australia, the original trio wanted to try a Traveling Wilburys style stripped back, acoustic approach to recording. The band quickly swelled, as Paul Norton's wife, Wendy Stapleton, and Wells' writing partner, Lucy De Soto joined in.

Wells was best known from his pioneering work with legendary Aussie hard rock band Rose Tattoo, while Norton had enjoyed a string of top chart hits, including Under A Southern Sky and Stuck on You. Carr, fresh off the success of country-rock band Big Whiskey, was co-owner of an independent label, Pelican Records, with distribution set up via Mushroom Records. Studio time was offered through Pelican's co-owner, via Studio Centre (where television shows such as Neighbours was being filmed. The band began recording their debut with the notion that each writer would sing their own songs, with the exceptions being Carr's song Brakeman, sung by Norton, and Wells/De Soto's Lonely, in which all three took a verse. The three swapped bass guitar duties, and drums were added by Ken Farmer, a former member of the original Moonshine Jug and String Band, which later became Aussie superstars, The Angels (Australian band). Stapleton and De Soto contributed backing vocals, and a full album was quickly realised.

== Volume One ==
The debut album, titled Volume One, was released in December 1994. The band made their live debut at a sold-out show at Melbourne's Continental Club, adding bassist Tim Millikan (formerly of Divinyls and Concrete Blonde, and joined on the night by Gerry Hale on violin. The band toured Australia into 1995, and were frequent musical guests on the daytime television shows, Good Morning Australia, and Ernie and Denise.

Late in 1995, several outside factors combined to force the group to take a hiatus. Stapleton starred in the popular The Dusty Springfield Story, taking Norton along as music director. Wells left to tour with Rose Tattoo, who had reformed at the behest of Guns N' Roses. Carr returned to Sydney, and produced artists for ABC Music.

== Volume Two ==
The group reunited mid 1997 to record Volume Two, at Norton's home studio, with John Farnham engineer Ross Cockle at the helm. The 15 tracks were mixed at ABC Australia's Melbourne studios, but only one track, Norton's song I Won't Come This Way Again was commercially released, as the lead track on ABC Music's compilation, Open Road, Volume Two. Again, outside projects and commitments kept the group from touring to support the new material, and by 1998, the members were scattered across Australia, the UK, and the USA.

== Later years ==
In 2005, talks had begun about a possible reunion, but Wells' health soon declined. Diagnosed with prostate cancer, he died 27 March 2006.

Norton and Carr continue their work in the music industry. Paul is an Australia Day ambassador, and Cletis regularly tours Europe and North America.

== Members ==
- Peter Wells, vocals, guitar, slide guitar, bass guitar
- Paul Norton, vocals, guitar, bass guitar
- Cletis Carr, vocals, guitar, slide guitar, bass guitar
- Tim Millikan, bass guitar
- Ken Farmer, drums, washboard
- Wendy Stapleton, backing vocals
- Lucy De Soto, backing vocals
