= Old Flame =

Old Flame may refer to:

== Music ==
=== Albums ===
- Old Flame (album), by Juice Newton, 1985
- Old Flames, by Sonny Rollins, 1993

=== Songs ===
- "Old Flame" (Alabama song), 1981
- "Old Flame" (Poco song), 1984; covered by Juice Newton, 1985
- "Old Flame", by Arcade Fire from Arcade Fire, 2003
- "Old Flame", by Johnny Reid from Dance with Me, 2009
- "Old Flame", by Kimbra from Vows, 2011

== Television episodes ==
- "Old Flame" (8 Simple Rules), 2005
- "Old Flame" (Dexter's Laboratory), 1998
- "An Old Flame" (Upstairs, Downstairs), 1975
- "The Old Flame" (Hiller and Diller), 1997
- "The Old Flame" (The Jeffersons), 1977
- "The Old Flame", an episode of Leave it to Charlie, 1980
- "Old Flames" (Cheers), 1983
- "Old Flames" (Screen Two), 1990

== Other uses ==
- "An Old Flame" (short story), a 1901 Raffles story by E. W. Hornung
- An Old Flame, a 1930 Krazy Kat film
- "The Old Flame", a poem by Robert Lowell included in his 1964 collection For the Union Dead

== See also ==
- "Old Flames Can't Hold a Candle to You", a country song popularized by several artists
