= Wanted – A Good Home =

- Upstairs, Downstairs episode
- Episode no.: Season 5 Episode 5
- Directed by: Christopher Hodson
- Written by: John Hawkesworth
- Production code: 5
- Original air date: 5 October 1975

Episode chronology
← Previous "The Joy Ride"	Next → "An Old Flame"

"Wanted – A Good Home" is the fifth episode of the fifth and final series of the period drama Upstairs, Downstairs. It first aired on 5 October 1975 on ITV.

== Background ==
"Wanted – A Good Home" was recorded in the studio on 6 and 7 March 1975, with the location footage having been filmed on 26 February in Eaton Place in Belgravia. John Hawkesworth, who wrote this episode, based some of the events seen in "Wanted – A Good Home" on his own childhood, having had a governess himself.

== Plot ==
It is the spring of 1922 and William, who is now eight years old, is off to a boarding preparatory school. After asking Virginia, Rose buys Alice a small dog, called "Thimble", to keep Alice company after William leaves.

Shortly after William leaves, Richard and Virginia go to France. Miss Treadwell, the governess, has been put in charge in their absence and annoys the servants by taking tea in the morning room. The servants are dismayed when she has Alice given bread and water for a meal as a punishment for misbehaviour. Jennifer Chivers, a friend, joins Alice for her lessons with Miss Treadwell. When Thimble chews Miss Treadwell's shoe, she orders the dog to be presented to her the following morning so she can have it put down. However, the servants hide Thimble in Edward and Daisy's room above the garage, and tell Miss Treadwell and Alice that it has gone "missing". It reappears moments after Richard and Virginia return home.

Miss Treadwell immediately complains about the behaviour of the servants, making many accusations against them. Virginia dismisses Miss Treadwell with four weeks wages in lieu of notice. It is decided that instead of having another governess, Alice will go to a day school in London – which Alice is very happy about.

== Cast ==
- Angela Baddeley - Mrs Bridges
- Gordon Jackson - Hudson
- Jean Marsh - Rose
- Hannah Gordon - Virginia Bellamy
- David Langton - Richard Bellamy
- Shirley Cain - Miss Treadwell
- Jenny Tomasin - Ruby
- Peter Forest - Bert
- Jacqueline Tong - Daisy
- Gareth Hunt - Frederick
- Anne Yarker - Alice Hamilton
- Jonathan Seely - William Hamilton
- Tracey Childs - Jennifer Chivers
- Danvers - Thimble
