= Run =

Running is moving swiftly on foot.

Run(s) or RUN may also refer to:

== Arts, entertainment, and media ==
=== Films ===
- Run (1991 film), an American action thriller
- Run, a 1994 Hong Kong film featuring Leon Lai
- Run (2002 film), an Indian Tamil film directed by N. Linguswamy starring Madhavan
- Run (2004 film), an Indian film, a Hindi remake of the Tamil film
- Run, a 2009 Croatian film directed by Nevio Marasović
- Run, a 2013 film featuring William Moseley
- Run (2014 film), a French-Ivorian film
- Run (2016 film), an Indian Telugu film
- The Run (film), a 2017 Australian-Indian documentary
- Run (2019 British film), a British drama
- Run (2020 Indian film), a 2020 Indian Telugu-language psychological thriller directed by Lakshmikanth Chenna
- Run (2020 American film), an American thriller
- Run, a 2025 alien invasion film directed by Chris Stokes
- Run (Uwe Boll film), an upcoming 2025 thriller directed by Uwe Boll

=== Games ===
- Run (cards), a series of playing cards with consecutive values
- Need for Speed: The Run, a 2011 racing video game

=== Literature ===
- Run (Image Comics), a comic book series by Mark Millar
- Run (novel), a novel by Ann Patchett
- The Run (novel), a novel by Stuart Woods
- Run, a novel in the Fearless series by Francine Pasca
- Run, a novel by Eric Walters
- Run, a novel by Blake Crouch

=== Music ===
==== Terminology ====
- Run (music), a musicology term for a short rapid series of notes

==== Albums ====
- Run (Alison Wonderland album) or the title song, 2015
- Run (Awolnation album) or the title song, 2015
- Run (B'z album) or the title song, 1992
- Run (Sanctus Real album) or the title song, 2013
- Run (Tofubeats album), or the title song, 2018
- Run, an EP and an album by Nine Mile, both 2001
- Run, an EP by Spiderbait, 1994

==== Songs ====
- "Ran" (song) (incorrectly romanized as "Run" by the band), by Luna Sea, 2013
- "Run" (Amy Macdonald song), 2008
- "Run" (Becky Hill and Galantis song), 2022
- "Run" (BTS song), 2015
- "Run" (Foo Fighters song), 2017
- "Run" (George song), 2001
- "Run" (George Strait song), 2001
- "Run" (Jesse & Joy song), English-language version of "¡Corre!", 2011
- "Run" (Joji song), 2020
- "Run" (Lighthouse Family song), 2002
- "Run" (Matt Nathanson and Sugarland song), 2011
- "Run" (Miranda Lambert song), 2025
- "Run" (Nicole Scherzinger song), 2014
- "Run" (OneRepublic song), 2021
- "Run" (Sash! song), featuring Boy George, 2002
- "Run" (Snow Patrol song), 2004; covered by Leona Lewis, 2008
- "Run" (Vampire Weekend song), 2010
- "Run (I'm a Natural Disaster)", by Gnarls Barkley, 2008
- "Run 2", or "Run" (album version), New Order, 1989
- "Run", by Air from Talkie Walkie, 2004
- "Run", by Bell Biv DeVoe from Three Stripes, 2017
- "Run", by Bring Me the Horizon from That's the Spirit, 2015
- "Run", by Broadcast 2000, 2008
- "Run", by Cappadonna from The Pillage, 1998
- "Run", by Cog from The New Normal, 2005
- "Run", by Collective Soul from Dosage, 1999
- "Run", by Disturbed from Indestructible, 2008
- "Run", by Eamon from Golden Rail Motel, 2017
- "Run", by Emma Bale, 2015
- "Run", by Epik High from Epilogue, 2010
- "Run!", by Exit Eden from Femme Fatales, 2024
- "Run", by Flo Rida from Wild Ones, 2012
- "Run", by Ghostface Killah from The Pretty Toney Album, 2004
- "Run", by GreatGuys from We're Not Alone_Chapter 2: You & Me, 2020
- "Run", by Hozier from Hozier, 2014
- "Run", by Jimmy Barnes with Mica Paris from Double Happiness, 2005
- "Run", by Juice Wrld, 2019
- "Run", by Kita Alexander, 2022
- "Run", by the Knux from Eraser, 2011
- "Run", by Kutless from Kutless, 2002
- "Run", by LANY from Malibu Nights, 2018
- "Run", by Leessang from Hexagonal, 2009
- "Run", by Lodovica Comello, 2018
- "Run", by Luminous, 2021
- "Run", by Maisie Peters from The Good Witch, 2023
- "Run", by Pink from The Truth About Love, 2012
- "Run", by Red Flag, 2009
- "Run", by Rex Goudie, 2005
- "Run", by Sandie Shaw, 1966
- "Run", by Seth Sentry from Strange New Past, 2015
- "Run", by Shihad, under the name Pacifier, from Pacifier, 2002
- "Run", by Shinhwa from Volume 9, 2008
- "Run", by SMP from Coda, 2010
- "Run", by Spiderbait from Shashavaglava, 1993
- "Run", by Stephen Fretwell from Magpie, 2004
- "Run", by Stray Kids from SKZ-Replay, 2022
- "Run", by Taylor Swift featuring Ed Sheeran from Red (Taylor's Version), 2021
- "Run", by Tiggs Da Author featuring Lady Leshurr, 2016
- "Run!", by Toby Fox from Undertale Soundtrack, 2015
- "Run", by Tony Jay, as Shere Khan, from the video game The Jungle Book Groove Party, 2000
- "Run", by Treasure from Reboot, 2023
- "Run", by Tyler, the Creator from Cherry Bomb, 2015
- "Run!", by Willow from Empathogen, 2024
- "Run", by Zeal & Ardor from Zeal & Ardor, 2022
- "Run (Run Run Run)", by Flobots from The Circle in the Square, 2012

=== Television ===
==== Series ====
- Run (American TV series), a 2020 comedy thriller series
- Run (British TV series), a 2013 British drama series
- Run (Indian TV series), a 2019–2020 Tamil-language thriller series
- Run (South Korean TV series), a 2020 variety show

==== Episodes ====
- "Run" (Dexter), 2012
- "Run!" (Heroes), 2007
- "Run" (The Newsroom), 2014
- "Run" (Quantico), 2015
- "Run" (Reservation Dogs), 2022
- "Run" (Scandal), 2015
- "Run" (Smallville), 2004
- "Run" (Without a Trace), 2007

=== Other uses in arts, entertainment, and media ===
- Run (magazine), a computer magazine of the 1980s
- Run, in video game speedrunning

== Codes ==
- Roland Garros Airport, Saint-Denis, Réunion (IATA code "RUN")
- ACT Airlines, a Turkey-based cargo airline (ICAO code "RUN")
- Kirundi language (ISO 639-2 and -3 code "Run")

== People ==
- Run (rapper), Joseph Simmons, now known as "Reverend Run", from the hip-hop group Run–DMC
- Giacomo Bufarini, known as RUN, Italian artist based in London, UK

== Places ==
- Run (island), Banda Islands, Indonesia
- Run (stream), North Brabant, Netherlands
- Roland Garros Airport, Saint-Denis, Réunion (IATA code "RUN")

== Science, technology, and mathematics ==
=== Computing ===
- Run command, a command used to begin execution of a program
- Run, a sequence of something repeated, in computer coding
  - Run-length encoding, a run of a single value

=== Earth science ===
- Run (waterfalls), the horizontal distance a waterfall flows
- Stream or run, a flowing body of water

=== Mathematics ===
- Run, a mathematical term for an x-axis span, compared to rise (a y-axis span); the equation rise over run calculates the slope of a line

== Sports ==
- Run (American football), an offensive action in American football
- Run (baseball), the unit of scoring in baseball
- Run (cricket), the unit of scoring in cricket
- Run, in basketball terminology, an interval in which one team heavily outscores the other
- Run, in sailing, to sail downwind
- Run, the unit of scoring in softball
- Run, a variety of events in track and field
- Piste or ski run, a marked trail down a mountain for winter sports

== Other uses ==
- Running, moving swiftly on foot
- Bank run, a mass withdrawal by many people of money from a bank
- Market run, similar to a bank run but concerning products and not cash
- Diarrhea or "the runs", an intestinal disease
- Regional Universities Network (RUN), a network of six universities primarily from Australia
- Sheep run, early Australian / New Zealand term for a sheep station operated by squatters
- Run, in textiles, a progressive unravelling of stockings, pantyhose or tights
- Run (meme), a Chinese Internet meme about migration

== See also ==
- International Research Universities Network (IRUN)
- Run Run Run (disambiguation)
- Running (disambiguation)
