= Runner (disambiguation) =

A runner is a person who runs.

Runner may also refer to:

== Arts and entertainment ==
=== Film and television ===
- Runner, the most junior member(s) of a film crew or member(s) of a television crew
- Runner, a film by the British artist Ravi Deepres
- Runner (2021 film), a Lithuanian film by Andrius Blaževičius
- Runner (2026 Spanish film), a drama film by Laura García Alonso
- Runner (2026 American film), an action thriller film by Scott Waugh
- The Runner (2026 film), a British action thriller film by Kevin Macdonald
- Runner (Stargate), a character in the fictional Stargate universe
- "Runner" (Stargate Atlantis), an episode of the television series Stargate Atlantis
- "Runner" (The Professionals), an episode of the crime-action television drama series
- Runner (Logans Run), a type of character in the film Logan's Run

=== Music ===
- Runner (band), a short-lived British rock band, formed in 1978
- The Runners (production duo), an American electronic and hip hop production duo
- Runner (album), a 2012 studio album by The Sea and Cake
- "Runner" (song), a 1981 song by Canadian musician Ian Thomas, also by Manfred Mann's Earth Band in 1984
- "Runner", a 2022 song by Alex G from the album God Save the Animals
- "Runner", a 2016 song by ASAP Mob from the album Cozy Tapes Vol. 1: Friends
- "Runner", a 2022 song by Joe Keery, also known as Djo, from the album Decide
- "Runner", a 2019 single by Tennis from the album Swimmer
- "Runner", a 2017 song by Why Don't We
- "The Runner" (song), a 2019 song by Foals
- "Runners", a 2024 song by Stray Kids from the EP Ate

=== Other media ===
- Runner (comics), a Marvel Comics character
- Sonic Runners, a video game
- Runner (sculpture), a 2017 sculpture by Tony Cragg

== Biology ==
- Any of several fishes of the family Carangidae called runners
- Stolon, an aerial shoot from a plant with the ability to produce adventitious roots and new clones, often called a runner

== Occupations ==
- Courier, a person who delivers messages, packages, and mail
- Runner (film production), a general assistant in a production office
- Runner (messenger), a military courier carrying messages by foot

== People ==
- George Runner, California Board of Equalization member and former State Senator (and husband of Sharon Runner)
- Sharon Runner, California State Senator (and wife of George Runner)

== Sport ==
- Athletic shoe, footwear primarily designed for sports or other forms of physical exercise
- Baserunner, an offensive player in baseball who has successfully reached at least first base
- Runner (cricket), a player who runs for an injured batsman
- Sling (climbing equipment), climbing equipment consisting of a tied or sewn loop of webbing that can be wrapped around a rock
- An employee of a sports agent, usually responsible for scouting and befriending potential future clients

== Transportation ==
- The long, flat, smooth ski-like glide on a sled
- Gilera Runner, a moped/scooter manufactured by Gilera
- USS Runner (SS-275), Gato-class submarine, 1942–1943
- USS Runner (SS-476), Tench-class submarine, 1944–1971

== Other uses ==
- "Runners", members of the Beguny subset of the Russian Bezpopovtsy religious movement
- Runner (casting), a channel in the gating system of a casting die
- Runner rug, a long, narrow rectangular carpet
- Running gag, a literary device in the form of a repeated joke or reference
- The rotating driven element of a water turbine (hydroelectric) generator
- Terrestrial locomotion

== See also ==
- Run (disambiguation)
- Running (disambiguation)
- The Runner (disambiguation)
- The Runners (disambiguation)
