= Running (disambiguation) =

Running is a gait of terrestrial locomotion, typically faster than walking.

Running or Runnin' may also refer to:

== Film and television ==
- Running (1979 film), a Canadian sports drama
- Running (upcoming film), an American sports film
- "Running" (Dead Set), a 2008 television episode
- "Running" (Not Going Out), a 2012 television episode
- "Running", an episode of Teletubbies
- "Running", an episode of Zoboomafoo

== Music ==
=== Albums ===
- Running (The Desert Rose Band album) (1988)
- Running (Trapeze album) (1979)

=== Songs ===
- "Runnin'" (The Pharcyde song)
- "Running" (James Bay song) (2016)
- "Running" (Sarah Brightman song) (2007)
- "Runnin" (21 Savage and Metro Boomin song), 2020
- "Runnin'" (BGYO and Keiko Necesario song) (2021)
- "Runnin'" (David Dallas song) (2013)
- "Runnin'" (Doman & Gooding song) (2009)
- "Running" (Evermore song) (2006)
- "Running" (Information Society song) (1985)
- "Running" (András Kállay-Saunders song) (2014)
- "Runnin' (Lose It All)", a 2015 song by Naughty Boy featuring Beyoncé and Arrow Benjamin
- "Running" (No Doubt song) (2003)
- "Running" (Sandro song)
- "Runnin' (Dying to Live)", a 2002 song by 2Pac featuring The Notorious B.I.G.
- "Running" (Jessie Ware song) (2012)
- "Running", a 2008 song by David Archuleta from David Archuleta
- "Runnin", a 1993 song by Bass Bumpers
- "Running", a 2000 song by Alan Braxe and Fred Falke
- "Runnin'", a 2000 song by Cher from not.com.mercial
- "Runnin'", a 1977 song by Earth, Wind and Fire from All 'n All
- "Runnin'", a 2005 song by Game featuring Tony Yayo, from The Documentary
- "Runnin'", a 2012 song by Adam Lambert from Trespassing
- "Runnin'", a 2010 song by Lil Wayne featuring Shanell, from Rebirth
- "Running", a 2018 song by Dua Lipa from Dua Lipa (Complete Edition)
- "Running", a 2013 song by Nine Inch Nails from Hesitation Marks
- "Running", a 2013 song by John Newman from Tribute
- "Running", a 2023 song by NF from Hope
- "Runnin'", a 2016 song by Pharrell Williams on the soundtrack of Hidden Figures
- "Runnin'", a 2016 song by Relient K from Air for Free
- "Running", a 1982 song by Chubby Checker from "The Change Has Come"
- "Running", a 2001 song by Timothy B. Schmit from Feed the Fire

== Other uses ==
- Runnings, American farm and ranch supply store chain
- Running (sailing), a sailing term referring to movement relative to wind direction
- Chain (unit) or running distance, a distance from a fixed starting point
- Running (computing), the period during which a computer program is executing

== See also ==
- Run (disambiguation)
- Runner (disambiguation)
- Running man (disambiguation)
- Utah Utes men's basketball or Runnin' Utes
