= The Joy Ride =

- Upstairs, Downstairs episode
- Episode no.: Season 5 Episode 4
- Directed by: Bill Bain
- Written by: Alfred Shaughnessy
- Production code: 4
- Original air date: 28 September 1975

Episode chronology
← Previous "Laugh a Little Louder Please"	Next → "Wanted – A Good Home"

"The Joy Ride" is the fourth episode of the fifth and final series of the period drama Upstairs, Downstairs. It first aired on 28 September 1975 on ITV.

== Background ==
"The Joy Ride" was recorded in the studio on 20 and 21 February 1975. Originally, Elizabeth Jane Howard had written a script called "The Price of Rubies", which would have shown James Bellamy gambling and getting involved with an unsuitable woman. However, for an unknown reason, this was quickly dropped and in the space of one long weekend Alfred Shaughnessy produced "The Joy Ride". A later episode, "An Old Flame", written by John Hawkesworth, had a storyline similar to "The Price of Rubies".

== Plot ==
Fall, 1921: Following the death of his aunt Kate, Lady Castleton, James uses £375 of the £1,000 she left him to buy an Avro 504 aeroplane. He has been taking flying lessons at Brooklands. On a clear, sunny day, James invites Virginia to go to Brooklands with him so he can take her flying. However, Richard wants her to sit in the Strangers Gallery in the House of Lords while he delivers an important speech, and then to go to tea with him and some friends. Virginia chooses to go with James, and Richard is visibly annoyed with her decision as well as James's use of the money.

On very short notice, Lady Prudence accompanies Richard to the Lords debate. When they return to Number 165 at 6.15pm, James and Virginia are still not home. Not long afterwards, Richard rings the flying club secretary, who tells him the two are missing. By 8.00pm the news has reached the front page of the Evening News. The article implies there is something improper going on between James and Virginia. There are reports that a plane was seen over James' ancestral home, Southwold in Wiltshire, that afternoon; and later on there is a sighting of a plane over the sea at Swanage.

Lady Prudence insists on staying at 165 Eaton Place, and sleeps on a morning room sofa as Richard dozes. In the morning, Richard gets a call that explains what happened. The plane had landed on a mudflat at Poole Harbour night, having gone south rather than east, and James and Virginia had to spend the night in the plane. In the morning, they were taken to Bournemouth and reported the accident, returning to London by train the same day. When they arrive, Richard is extremely angry, mainly due to fear of what might have happened to them. Richard and Virginia make up.

== Cast ==
- David Langton - Richard Bellamy
- Simon Williams - James Bellamy
- Hannah Gordon - Virginia Bellamy
- Jean Marsh - Rose
- Gordon Jackson - Hudson
- Joan Benham - Lady Prudence Fairfax
- Gareth Hunt - Frederick
- Karen Dotrice - Lily
- Jenny Tomasin - Ruby
