= Cletis Carr =

American musician

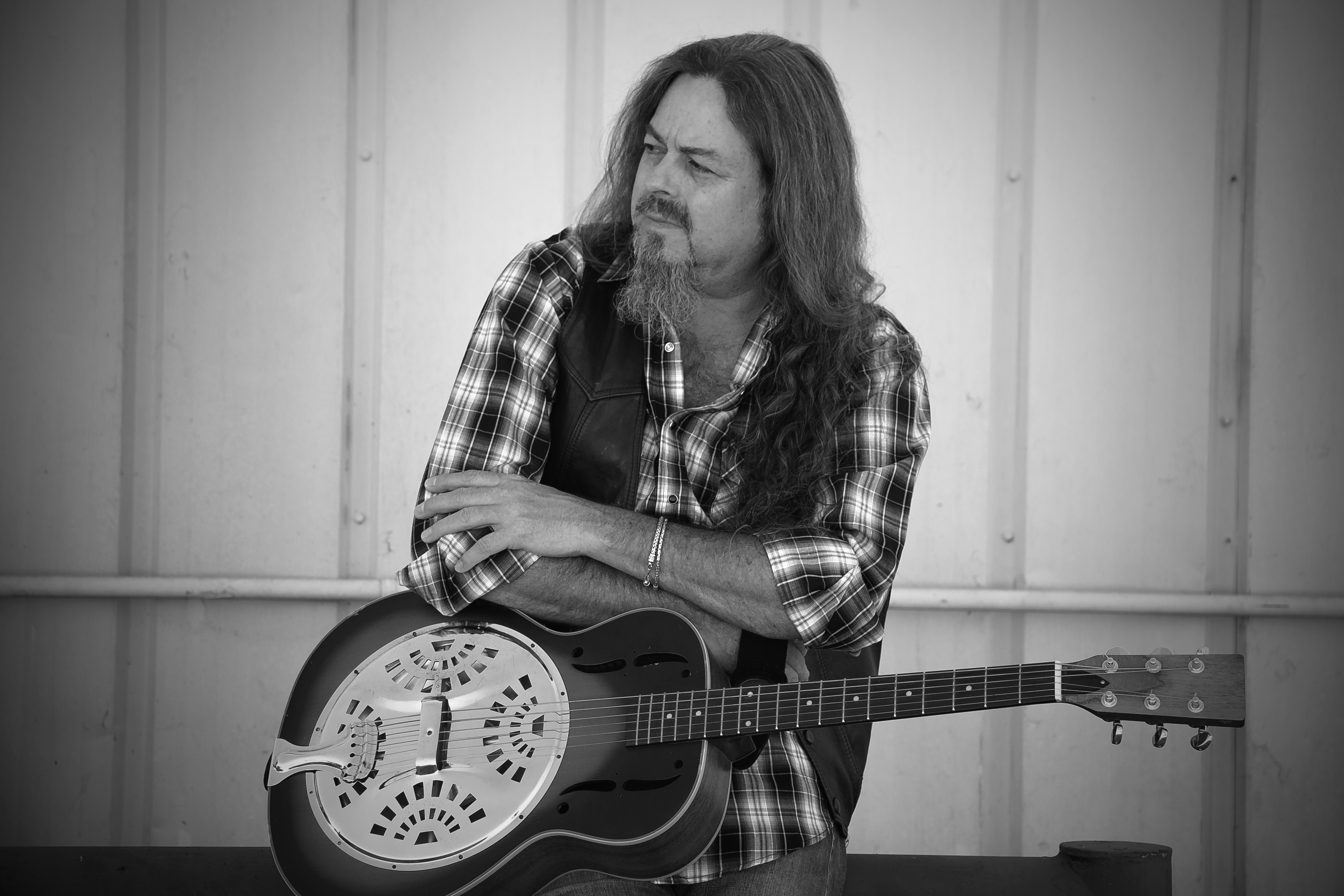
- Cletis Carr

Background information
- Born: Cletis Carr; August 4, 1959 (age 66); Portland, Oregon, United States
- Genres: Alternative country, Folk rock, Blues-rock, Acoustic
- Occupations: Singer, songwriter, record producer, guitarist, keyboardist
- Instruments: vocals, guitar, slide guitar, mandolin, bass guitar, piano, organ
- Years active: 1975–present
- Website: Cletis.com

Cletis Carr (born August 4, 1959) is an American singer-songwriter, guitarist and record producer. Carr was a founder of the Pacific Northwest 1970s new wave music band Sneakers, before embarking on a solo career between forming other bands such as Big Whiskey and Hillbilly Moon.

== Early life ==
Carr was born into a family of professional country music players, including his father Bob Carr who once toured with Ray Price's Cherokee Cowboys. His uncles Joe Carr and Raleigh "Curly" Cletis Carr also played during the 1950s and 1960s. In 1961 Carr's cousin Tom Blair with his band the West Coasters had a Top 40 hit with Dollar Bills. Carr's family would hold annual reunion weekends where musical instruments were set up and family members performed. Carr was born in Portland, Oregon, but grew up in Eugene Oregon, after his family moved there when he was eight years old.

== Biography ==
After kicking around with various school bands around Oregon, Carr joined a local band called Shaniko, named after a ghost town in Eastern Oregon. A few years, name and personnel changes later, they became The News until they learned that ex-Clover frontman Huey Lewis had just formed a band in San Francisco called The News. They changed their name again, settling on Sneakers.

Teaming up with local concert promoters Allen and Phillip Kovac who were moving into artist management, and local businessman Huck Coleman, the band set about recording their debut album. The Kovacs enlisted ColGems songwriter Roger Atkins, known for his hits with the Animals and the Monkees, to produce. A record deal was struck with New York-based MMO Group, and Ear Cartoons was released late in 1980 to rave reviews, including a Billboard Magazine Pick of the Week.

After a year of solid touring, including shows at the legendary Los Angeles venue, Whisky a Go Go, the band became disenchanted with their career direction, cutting ties with the Kovacs and their label. Carr left the band in 1981 but returned the next year for a couple of shows and to co-produce their second album, Music From The Sole (which remains unreleased).

After leaving Sneakers, Carr moved to Portland, Oregon and joined Them Roosters, a spinoff band formed by Lenny Rancher of new wave heroes The Malchicks. Carr spent the next three years travelling and performing around the United States and the U.K., with his Cletis Carr Band and with other outfits. He recorded his debut single That Kind of a Girl / Without Yo, then followed up with an EP, Visible Tracks.

Carr moved to Australia in 1986 for an intended holiday with family there. Within days, he had a job at a local music store and had joined two bands. Playing with Lucy DeSoto and Rose Tattoo legend Peter Wells's band, he was introduced to industry icon Sebastian Chase whose label was distributed by CBS (now Sony). He was offered a recording deal and in 1987 began work on his next album, Colourblind, which featured the playing of Wells and fellow Tatts guitarist Mick Cocks. After touring in support of that release, he joined Chris Turner's Big Rock Band, a touring ensemble which featured members of AC/DC, The Saints and Jimmy Barnes.

Carr relocated to Melbourne and released two more solo albums, Tales of Ordinary Madness in 1991 and Wooden Nails in 1992 before joining country-rock band Big Whiskey. He wrote the bulk of their debut album which was released in 1994, then left the band to concentrate on his new project, the "Traveling Wilburys"-styled acoustic outfit Hillbilly Moon, formed with Wells and Top-40 recording artist Paul Norton. The trio were augmented by Norton's wife, singer Wendy Stapleton and Wells' writing partner DeSoto, as well as former Divinyls and Concrete Blonde bassist Tim Millikan. Their first album, Volume One was released in December 1994, debuting at Melbourne's Continental Club to a sold-out house.

The band toured for some time but other commitments soon halted their progress. Stapleton had begun performing in the popular Dusty Springfield Show and Wells took off for Europe with the reformed Rose Tattoo. Carr returned to Sydney, where he became a staff writer for Warner/Chappell Music and produced a series of releases for ABC Music's new talent program. He teamed rising country artists the Crosby Sisters with Aussie legend Russell Morris and produced a revamped cover of Russell's 1972 hit "Wings of an Eagle", winning Duo/Trio of the Year at the 1998 Australian Country Music Awards.

In 1999, Carr moved to Nashville and pursued his songwriting career, cowriting with many notable writers and performing regularly on the circuit at the Bluebird Café, Douglas Corner, the Broken Spoke and others. He again drifted behind the scenes, assisting his manager pals Greg Shaw (Keith Urban) and Gina Mendello (Tommy Emmanuel) as well as landing a job with a couple of New Media dotcoms. A mild heart attack slowed him down and he returned to Sydney in 2001, landing a stint at Liberation Music.

Through the 2000s he continued to perform and write. The recording of What About You, co-written with and performed by Brooke Leal, was featured over the closing credits of the 2003 hit Australian film, Danny Deckchair. He co-owned three café / music venues and hosted regular Sunday songwriters' sessions in Sydney, taking a year out to run an independent record label, Figtree Words and Music, for seminal Aussie garage rockers Lime Spiders. In 2010, he launched The Listening Room, an acoustic singer and performer showcase aimed at providing emerging artists opportunities to grow and enhance their skills. 2015 saw him put together a band of talented young local musicians to back Rose Tattoo legend, Angry Anderson in a sold-out performance in the Blue Mountains.

Throughout the next decade, he continued to record, perform, and tour, mainly in Australia, the UK, Ireland and Europe. In 2016, he released his eighth solo album, and toured the United States in support of it.

== Current ==
Carr maintains residences in both Sydney Australia, and Nashville, Tennessee. He is active as a songwriter, guitarist, mentor, teacher, and author.

== Discography ==
- Soiled Angels – Shaniko (1977)
- Ear Cartoons – Sneakers (1979)
- Music From The Sole – Sneakers (1981)
- That Kind of a Girl – Cletis Carr (1984)
- Visible Tracks – Cletis Carr (1985)
- Colourblind – Cletis Carr (1987)
- Tales of Ordinary Madness – Cletis Carr (1991)
- Wooden Nails – Cletis Carr (1992)
- The Distance – Big Whiskey (1994)
- Volume One – Hillbilly Moon (1994)
- Volume Two – Hillbilly Moon (1996)
- The ABC Sessions – Cletis Carr (1999)
- Blues Pirates – Blues Pirates (2007)
- Footsteps – Cletis Carr (2011)
- Sunday Morning Tunes – Cletis Carr (2011)
- Stones – Cletis Carr (2012)
- Sedalia Blues – Cletis Carr (2016)
- Lurid Casino of Existence – Cletis Carr (2021)
- Hard Working People – Cletis Carr (2022)
- Trouble & Me – Cletis Carr (2023)

== Also featured on ==
- The Open Road – Various Artists (1997)
- The Open Road II – Various Artists (1998)
- 25 Years of Big Rock – Various Artists (2005)
- Bakers Dozen – Various Artists (2007)
- 30 Years of Big Rock – Various Artists (2010)
- 35 Years of Big Rock – Various Artists (2015)
- Delta Blues Variants – Various Artists (2021)
- 40 Years of Big Rock – Various Artists (2021)

== Productions and co-productions ==
- Dez Williams – Walking on a Border (1992)
- Angie Marquis – Love Me Again (1995)
- Russell Morris & the Crosby Sisters – Wings of an Eagle (1996)
- Crosby Sisters – Train of Desperation (1996)
- Nicole Brophy – Running Out of Love (1996)
- Tanya Sullivan – Strange Town (1996)
- Jo Jo Leslie – For No Other Reason (1997)
- Tracy Lee Killeen – Ophelia's Charms (1998)
- Karen Lynne – Labour of Love (1998)
- Nicole Brophy – Maybe It's Time (1998)
- Luke Schweizer – Younger Days (2015)
- Saintess Larnia – Faded / Bottletop Blues (2016)
- Izzy Cobcroft – Weighing Me Down (2020)
