= Paul Norton (musician) =

Australian rock, pop musician (born 1961)

- Born: Paul McNaughton; 31 March 1961 (age 65)
- Origin: Melbourne, Australia
- Genres: Rock; pop
- Occupations: Musician; singer-songwriter
- Instruments: Vocals; guitar; bass guitar
- Years active: 1979–present
- Label: Mushroom
- Formerly of: Runners
- Website: paulnorton.com.au

Paul Norton (born Paul McNaughton, 31 March 1961) is an Australian singer-songwriter and guitarist. He was bass guitarist of the pop rock band Runners before launching a solo career in 1987.

== Biography ==
=== 1979–1987: The Runners ===
Paul Norton (as Paul McNaughton) started playing bass guitar in various bands in his teens. In the late 1970s he formed the band, City, in Melbourne with Mark Edwards on vocals and guitar, Mark Greig on guitar and Trevor Reading on lead guitar. In 1980 local pop singer Ronnie Charles (ex-the Groop), recorded a single, "Rock and Roll Hoodlum", with his backing band, the Runners. The pop rock group were formed by Norton on bass guitar and backing vocals, Edwards and Reading with Grant Hamston on drums and Lester Price on keyboards.

The Runners separated from Charles in early 1981 and attracted "a strong following on the pub circuit". Former bandmate Greig replaced Price on keyboards and guitar in 1982 and they signed to Mushroom. The group released their first single "Sure Fire Thing" in that year, which was produced by Beeb Birtles. Runners followed with a single, "Endlessly" (January 1983) and its associated album, Hitting the Wall (March 1983). The Runners toured throughout the early eighties but had numerous line up changes before disbanding late in 1984. During his time with Runners, Norton co-wrote various tracks including, "Don't Apologise", "Walk Between the Lines" and "Sky Is Falling".

Norton spent mid- to late 1980s playing with various bands. He briefly joined Wendy and the Rocketts [sic] in 1985. He followed with a stint in Steve Hoy and the Hoy Boys (1985–1988) alongside former bandmates Grieg and Hamston; they backed Newcastle-born folk and blues singer-songwriter, Hoy. Norton was recorded on Hoy's extended play, Possession (1987).

=== 1988–1993: Early solo career ===
Norton on lead vocals and lead guitar issued his debut single, "Larapinta", independently in 1987 via Enrec. In the following year he signed with Mushroom as a solo artist to release another single, "Stuck on You", which peaked at number three on the Australian charts. It was certified gold in 1989 for shipment of 35000 units. Norton's debut album, Under a Southern Sky was released in August 1990, which peaked at number 44. It was produced by Paul Muggleton. For touring, the singer-songwriter, guitarist formed the Paul Norton Band with his spouse Wendy Stapleton (ex-Wendy and the Rocketts [sic]) on backing vocals, Greig on guitar, Tim Milikan on bass guitar and Derek Pellicci on drums (ex-Little River Band).

In 1991, Norton commenced work in this second album, Let It Fly, which was released in October 1992. The singles were "Lil Red Riding Hood" and "When We Were Young". Neither album nor singles reached the top 50.

=== 1994–2005: Hillbilly Moon ===
In 1994 Norton formed Hillbilly Moon with Peter Wells (ex-Rose Tattoo) on guitars and vocals and Cletis Carr on guitars and vocals. Later that year they released an album, Hillbilly Moon Volume One, with the song "She Left Me" receiving airplay on Country Music Television.

=== 2006–present ===
In 2006, Norton toured Australia with The Countdown Spectacular, featuring 27 of Australia's top rock acts of the 1970s and 1980s performing to 100,000 people nationwide.

== Personal life ==
Norton is married to Australian performer and actress Wendy Stapleton. They have one daughter, Alexandra, who performs under the name Ally Mac.

== Discography ==
=== Studio albums ===
List of albums, with selected details and chart positions
| Title | Album details | Peak chart positions |
| Title | Album details | AUS |
|---|---|---|
| Under a Southern Sky | Released: August 1990; Format: LP, CD, cassette; Label: Mushroom (TVD93326) | 44 |
| Let It Fly | Released: October 1992; Format: CD, cassette; Label: Mushroom (D 30840) | 141 |

=== Singles ===
List of singles, with Australian chart positions
| Title | Year | Peak chart positions | | Certification | Album |
| Title | Year | AUS | NZ | Certification | Album |
|---|---|---|---|---|---|
| "Stuck on You" | 1989 | 3 | 33 | ARIA: Gold | Under a Southern Sky |
| "I Got You" | 1989 | 31 | — | | Under a Southern Sky |
| "Southern Sky" | 1990 | 37 | — | | Under a Southern Sky |
| "Billy Billy" | 1990 | 114 | — | | Under a Southern Sky |
| "Shake That Devil" | 1991 | — | — | | Under a Southern Sky |
| "When We Were Young" | 1992 | 99 | — | | Let It Fly |
| "Lil' Red Ridin' Hood" | 1993 | 147 | — | | Let It Fly |
