= Laugh a Little Louder Please =

- Upstairs, Downstairs episode
- Episode no.: Season 5 Episode 3
- Directed by: Derek Bennett
- Written by: Rosemary Anne Sisson
- Production code: 3
- Original air date: 21 September 1975

Episode chronology
← Previous "A Place in the World"	Next → "The Joy Ride"

"Laugh a Little Louder Please" is the third episode of the fifth and final series of the period drama Upstairs, Downstairs. It first aired on 21 September 1975 on ITV.

== Background ==
Laugh a Little Louder Please was recorded in the studio on 6 and 7 February 1975. Rosemary Anne Sisson, the writer of this episode, used We Danced All Night, the autobiography of Barbara Cartland, party as an inspiration for this episode. We Danced All Night was also used for other episodes in which Georgina played a main role. Sisson also brought some of her own experiences and feelings, as a child in the Second World War, into this episode.

== Plot ==
It is the summer of 1921, and Georgina, James, Diana Newbury and Captain Robin Eliott decide to hold a fancy dress "Freedom Party" while Richard and Virginia are away in Geneva on League of Nations business. Shortly after the party has started, Miss Treadwell, Alice and William's new governess, arrives at Eaton Place. Later in the evening, Georgina and Robin are upstairs in the nursery talking and Robin proposes to Georgina. When she refuses, Robin says in that case, he will kill himself as he cannot live without her. Georgina does not believe him, and walks out. Not long after, Miss Treadwell discovers Robin shot himself just outside the nursery. Hudson, who arrived seconds after Miss Treadwell found the body, reads a letter Captain Eliott wrote on the back of a drawing from the nursery: "My dearest Georgina. You will never know how much I loved you. My life would be unbearable without you. God bless. Robin". Hudson destroys the note before anyone else notices it. The following morning, Georgina carries on as normal, merely saying "it did rather spoil the party, didn't it?".

Meanwhile, Edward suggests to Daisy that they emigrate to Canada, but Daisy reminds him how lucky they are compared to many others. Diana Newbury and James talk about her marriage to Bunny, and she shows little affection for her husband.

== Cast ==
- Lesley-Anne Down - Georgina Worsley
- Angela Baddeley - Mrs Bridges
- Gordon Jackson - Hudson
- Jean Marsh - Rose
- Simon Williams - James Bellamy
- Celia Bannerman - Diana Newbury
- Christopher Beeny - Edward
- Osmond Bullock - Captain Robin Eliott
- Karen Dotrice - Lily
- Jacqueline Tong - Daisy
- Gareth Hunt - Frederick
- Jenny Tomasin - Ruby
- Shirley Cain - Miss Treadwell
- John Quayle - Bunny Newbury
- Madeleine Cannon - Lady Dolly Hale
- Trevor Ray - The Hon. Tommy Spenton
- Anne Yarker - Alice Hamilton
- Jonathan Seely - William Hamilton
- Marsha Fitzalan - Bluebird (Party Guest)
- Julia Schofield - Geraldine (Party Guest dressed as Charlie Chaplin)
- Victor Langley - Bather (Party Guest)
- Nicholas Hunter - Red Indian (Party Guest)
