= Stephen Fretwell =

British singer-songwriter (born 1981)

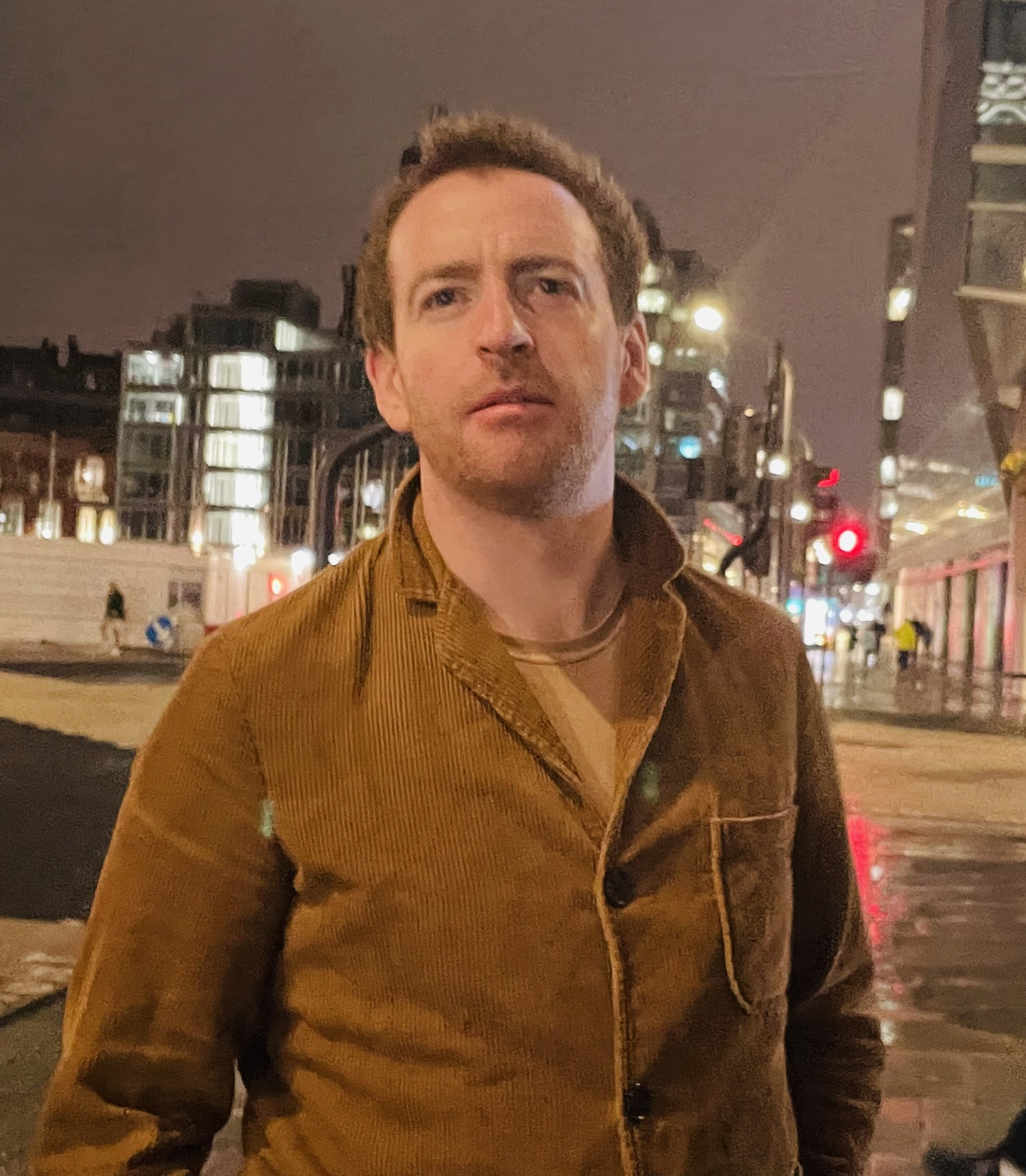
- Fretwell in London

Background information
- Born: 10 November 1981 (age 44)
- Origin: Scunthorpe, England
- Genres: Folk rock; psychedelic folk
- Occupation: Singer-songwriter
- Instrument(s): Vocals, guitar, bass guitar
- Years active: 2000–present

Stephen Fretwell (born 10 November 1981) is an English singer-songwriter. He has released four studio albums and is often compared with acts such as Bob Dylan, Fred Neil, and Tim Buckley. Though receiving critical success, Fretwell has enjoyed little commercial success. His music has been described as folk rock, a genre combining mainstream rock and pop with American folk music and poetic or introspective lyrics. His song "Run" (2005) was used as the theme song of the BBC sitcom Gavin & Stacey.

== Biography ==
=== Early life ===
Fretwell was born in Scunthorpe, England on 10 November 1981. He discovered the music of Bob Dylan at a young age in the form of the Bob Dylan's Greatest Hits record which he found in a bargain bin.

Fretwell attended St. Augustine Webster Primary School in Scunthorpe and St. Bede's Catholic School in Ashby before furthering his study at John Leggott College. It was in his teenage years that he started his first band, named Label.

After moving to Manchester to attend Salford University, to study English, but dropped out within a few days, he started to earn notices in NME and Q. During this period songs such as "Emily" and "What's That You Say Little Girl?" were first written.

=== 2002–2006: 8 Songs and Magpie ===
Fretwell decided to stay in Manchester permanently, later releasing 8 Songs which he released on Northern Ambition, a label owned by a friend. He left university after one year, and started to perform at local acoustic nights in the Manchester area. The first of these was at The Roadhouse, a venue in the centre of Manchester's Northern Quarter, he soon found himself wrapped up in the Manchester music scene of the early 2000s.

He later released the Something's Got to Give EP and The Lines, both self-financed. He then supported Travis, Elbow, Athlete, Keane and KT Tunstall. Signed to Fiction Records, and while under management by Colin Lester's and Ian McAndrew's Wildlife entertainment, his debut album Magpie was released in November 2004. It was recorded at Abbey Road Studios. It peaked at No. 27 in the UK Albums Chart in August 2005. The first single taken from the album was "Run" and was subsequently followed by "Emily" (2005) and the Four Letter Words EP. "Emily" reached No. 42 in the UK Singles Chart in August 2005. He had previously supported Oasis at Marlay Park in Dublin on 16 July 2005.

He was described by Q as "Scunthorpe's finest export... ever". Fretwell described this as flattering but not something he actively encouraged.

His version of Jeff Buckley's "Morning Theft" appeared on the 2005 tribute album Dream Brother: The Songs of Tim and Jeff Buckley.

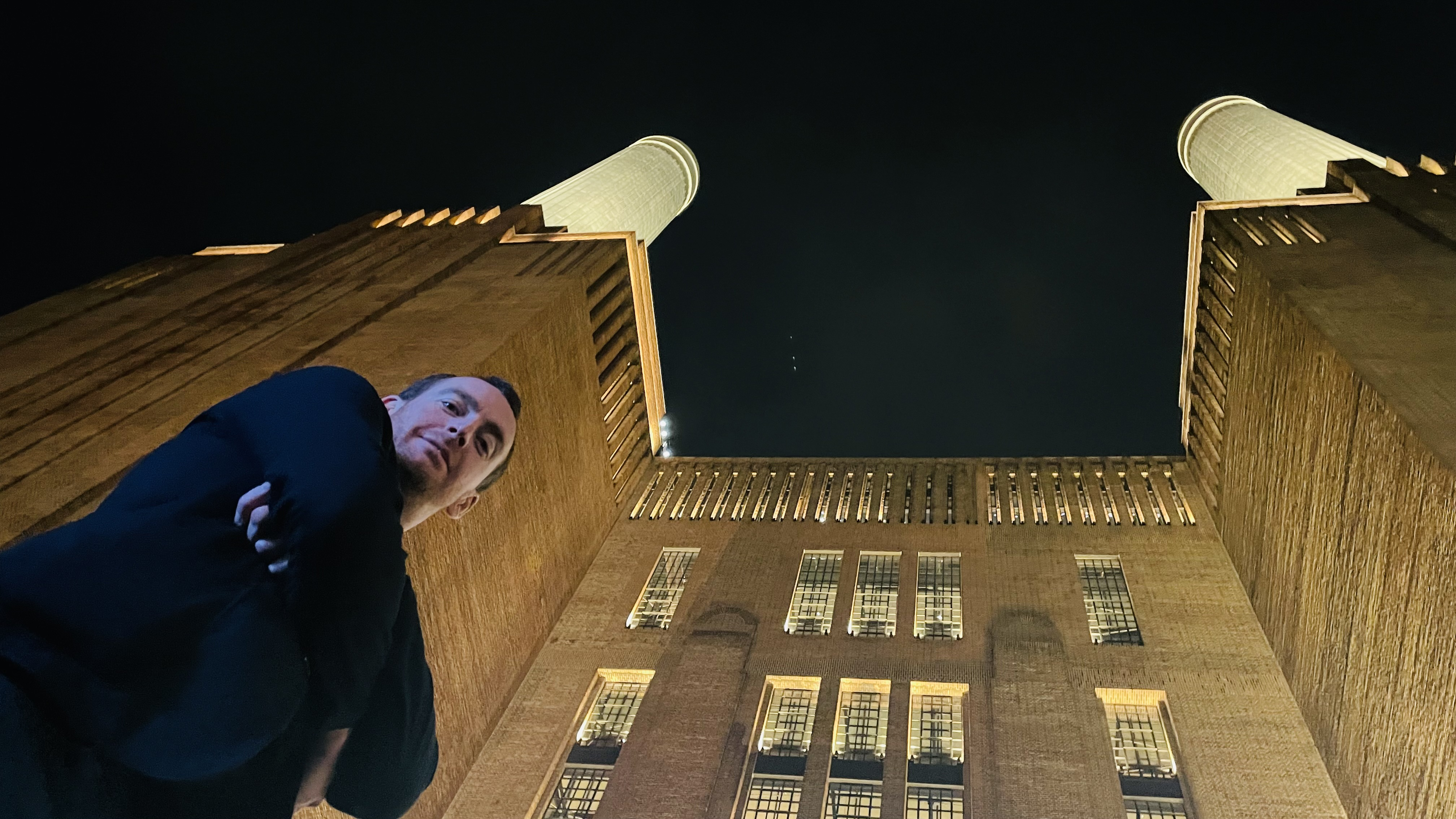
Fretwell posing outside Battersea Power Station

His song Play featured in the 2005 Dominic Savage film Love + Hate.

Cameron Crowe is a fan of Fretwell's work, Crowe encouraged Fretwell to write songs for the film Elizabethtown (2005) and even sent Fretwell his own personal copy of the Easy Rider soundtrack as a gift.

His song "Bad Bad You, Bad Bad Me" was featured in an episode of the ABC family drama Brothers & Sisters called "The Missionary Imposition".

=== 2007–2012: Man on the Roof and the Last Shadow Puppets ===
He released a single called "Scar" on 3 September 2007, which was included on his album Man on the Roof. This album was recorded in New York City, released by Fiction Records on 10 September 2007, and featured James Iha. In the UK Albums Chart the album would peak at number 44, becoming his second Top 75 hit.

His song "Run" is the theme tune to the situation comedy Gavin & Stacey and his song "Darling Don't" appeared on the third series of the teen drama Skins.

Fretwell also played bass on tour with the Last Shadow Puppets, the side project of Arctic Monkeys' Alex Turner, another fan of Fretwell.

His song "Play" from the album Magpie was featured in the 2009 movie The Joneses.

On 4 April 2011 Manchester Aid to Kosovo released a charity album, Ten, to which Fretwell contributed the track "Tamarind". Also contributing to the album were fellow Manchester artists Elbow, Badly Drawn Boy, and Cherry Ghost.

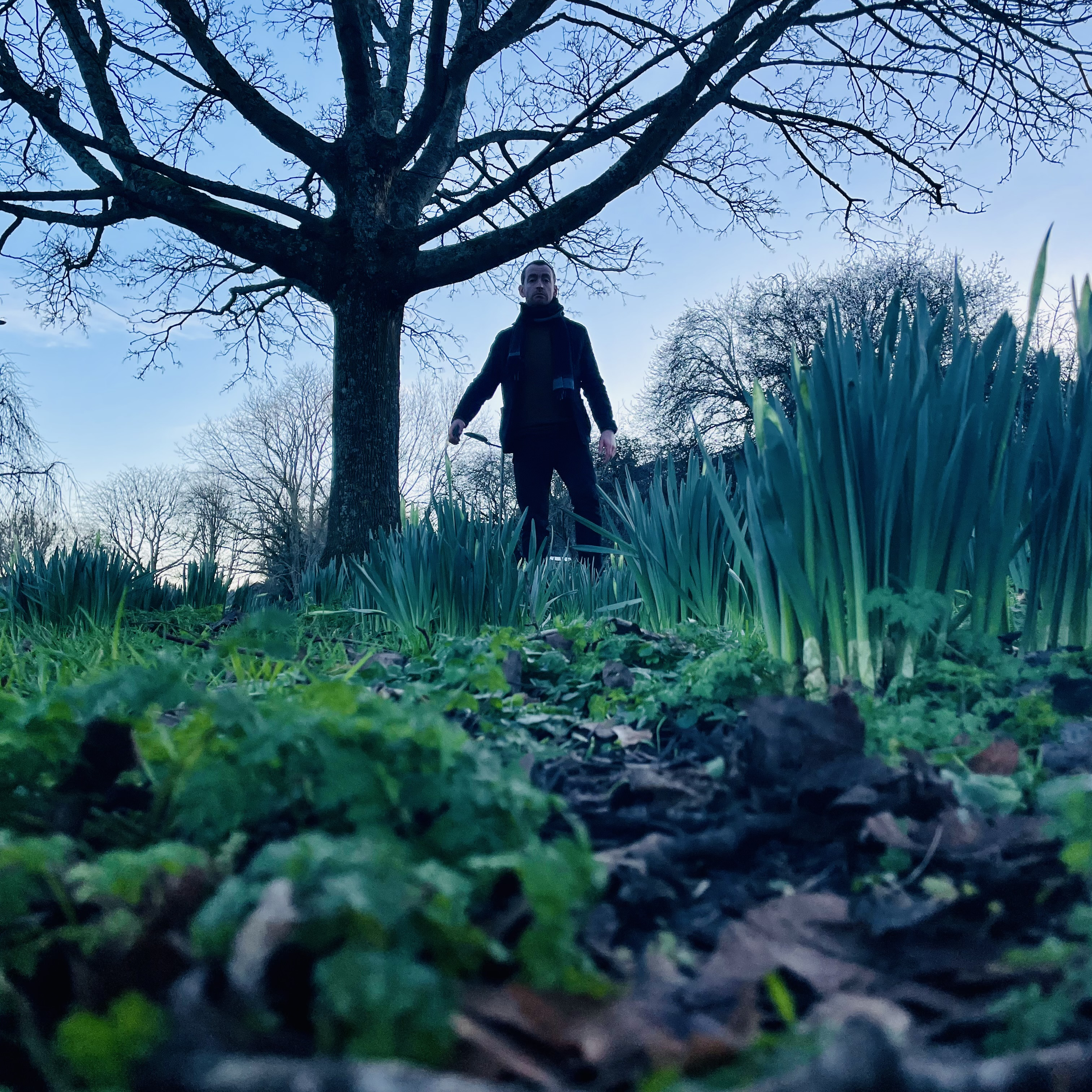
Fretwell in a press photo for Busy Guy

In 2012, he quit music to focus on his family.

=== 2021–present: Returning to music and Busy Guy ===
On 1 March 2021, Fretwell released the single "Oval" after a 13-year hiatus and announced the album Busy Guy, released on cult indie record label Speedy Wunderground owned by friend Dan Carey, who also produced the record. The album released to critical acclaim, with Far Out praising the "cycle of colour songs that fill up the second half of the LP" and Beats Per Minute calling it a "delicately sincere and softly stark album".

== Discography ==
=== Albums ===
- 8 Songs (mini-album, 2002)
- Magpie (Fiction, 2004) UK No. 27
- Man on the Roof (Fiction, 2007) UK No. 44
- Busy Guy (Speedy Wunderground/PIAS, 2021)

=== EPs ===
- Something's Got to Give
- The Lines
- Four Letter Words (2007)

=== Singles ===
- "Run" (2005) UK No. 79
- "Emily" (2005) UK No. 42
- "New York" (2005)
- "Scar" (2007)
- "Oval" (2021)
- "Embankment" (2021)
- "The Long Water" (2021)

=== Other contributions ===
- Dream Brother: The Songs of Tim and Jeff Buckley (2006, Full Time Hobby) – "Morning Theft"
