= The Runner =

The Runner may refer to:

== Films ==
- The Runner, a 1972 film featuring Delvene Delaney
- The Runner (1984 film), an Iranian drama film
- The Runner (1999 film), a crime thriller film
- The Runner, a 2013 documentary about Salah Ameidan
- The Runner (2015 film), an American political thriller film
- The Runner, a 2021 film directed by Michelle Danner
- The Runner (2026 film), an American action thriller film starring Gal Gadot

== Television ==
- "The Runner" (Juliet Bravo), a 1980 television episode
- "The Runner" (Cold Case), a 2003 television episode
- The Runner (TV series), an 2016 American reality series on go90

== Music ==
- The Runner (song), a 2019 single by British band Foals
- "Runner" (song) or "The Runner", a 1984 single by Manfred Mann's Earth Band
- "The Runner", a 1979 single by The Three Degrees

== Publications ==
- The Runner, a 1970s running magazine merged with Runner's World
- The Runner, a 1985 book by Cynthia Voigt

== See also ==
- Runner (disambiguation)
- The Runners (disambiguation)
