= A Place in the World =

A Place in the World may refer to:

- A Place in the World (Mary Chapin Carpenter album), 1996
- A Place in the World (The Black Sorrows album), 1985
- A Place in the World (film), a 1992 Oscar-nominated film
- A Place in the World (Upstairs, Downstairs), a 1975 fifth series Upstairs, Downstairs episode
- A Place in the World (miniseries), a 1979 Australian mini series
