= Dru (singer) =

Canadian singer and songwriter

- Also known as: Dru
- Born: Andrew Grange
- Origin: Toronto, Ontario, Canada
- Genres: R&B, hip hop, pop
- Occupations: Singer-songwriter, record producer
- Years active: 1993–present
- Label: Effortless Entertainment/MMG/JVC Records
- Website: http://www.druofficial.com

Andrew Grange, known professionally as Dru, is a Canadian singer and songwriter. He is an R&B/Soul Juno Award and MuchMusic Video Award (MMVA) winner.

== Career ==
Beginning in 1993, Dru was the front man for the R&B group In Essence. The group released the album The Master Plan with songs such as "You'll Never Find," which was also featured on Funkmaster Flex's gold release 60 Minutes of Funk Vol. 4. Dru's single "Gettin It In," from his album On The Brink, went to radio in August 2011, followed by the album On the Brink. The band won a Juno Award in 2004.

Dru released his solo debut album The One in 2008, and the album was rated 3.5 out of 4 stars by the Toronto Star. He was also named emerging artist of the month by Canada's No. 1 CHR/Top 40 station, CHUM FM.

Dru's first three singles "The One", "Stay with Me (Always)", and "Seasons" received national radio rotation. In 2009, Dru topped the radio and video charts in both Canada and the UK as the featured artist on the hit single "Runnin" by DJs Doman and Gooding. The single earned Dru another Juno Award nomination in 2010 for "Dance Recording of The Year." Dru has been identified by Billboard Magazine as "one of the most important emerging Canadian artists".

== Discography ==
=== Studio albums ===
Title	Information
The One	First studio album; Released: 2008; Label: Morojele Music Group; Format: CD, digital download
On the Brink	Second studio album; Released: 29 November 2011; Label: Effortless Entertainment/Universal Music Canada; Format: CD, digital download|-
Déjà Vu	Third studio album; Released: 15 April 2015; Label: Effortless Entertainment/Universal Music Canada; Format: CD, digital download
The Rebirth MMXX	Fourth studio album; Released: 27 May 2021; Label: Effortless Entertainment; Format: Digital download

=== Singles ===
Year	Title	CAN	Certifications	Album
2007	"Stay With Me (Always)"	—		The One
2008	"What You Wanna Do"	—		The One
2008	"Seasons"	—		The One
2010	"This Christmas"	—		non-album single
2011	"Gettin' It In"	50		On the Brink
2012	"She Can Ride"	39		On the Brink
2013	"Love Collision"	—		On the Brink
2015	"Déjà Vu"	—		Déjà Vu
2016	"Don't Be Afraid"	—		The Rebirth MMXX
2018	"You"	—		The Rebirth MMXX
2020	"YNF"	—		The Rebirth MMXX
2020	"Can't Get Enough"	—		The Rebirth MMXX

- MC: Gold

=== As a featured artist ===
Year	Title	Peak	Album
Year	Title	CAN	Album
2009	"Runnin'" (Doman & Gooding featuring Lincoln & Dru)	43	non-album single
