= An Old Flame (Upstairs, Downstairs) =

- Upstairs, Downstairs episode
- Episode no.: Season 5 Episode 6
- Directed by: Derek Bennett
- Written by: John Hawkesworth
- Production code: 6
- Original air date: 12 October 1975

Episode chronology
← Previous "Wanted – A Good Home"	Next → "Disillusion"

"An Old Flame" is the sixth episode of the fifth and final series of the period drama Upstairs, Downstairs. It first aired on 12 October 1975 on ITV.

== Background ==
"An Old Flame" was recorded in the studio on 20 and 21 March 1975. The plot of An Old Flame started as a script by Elizabeth Jane Howard called The Price of Rubies. The Price of Rubies was due to be made for broadcast on 28 September, but for an unknown reason it was dropped and replaced by the quickly-written episode The Joy Ride. The plot of The Price of Rubies, was later taken over by John Hawkesworth, who adapted it into An Old Flame.

== Plot ==
It is May 1923, and by chance James meets Diana Newbury at a club in London. Minutes later the police raid the club, but James and Diana escape through a side room. Outside, they kiss passionately. Diana then gets James to ask her to stay with him at a cottage in Sandwich that he is using while golfing. James agrees, and Edward accompanies him as his valet. Diana Newbury brings her lady's maid Violet Marshall, who flirts with an unresponsive Edward.

Diana soon confesses she still loves James, and has since she was 13. They sleep together, and afterwards discuss the idea of her leaving her husband Bunny, James's best friend, and going with James to live abroad. Diana suggests going to France immediately; without telling James, she has already left a note at Bunny's club saying she has left him. However, Bunny returns earlier than expected and finds it. Bunny visits Richard, who has returned from Scotland due to Bonar Law's resignation as Prime Minister. Richard telephones James to tell him that Bunny knows, and James returns to London with Diana against her wishes.

Bunny and James meet, and Bunny says he will not divorce Diana, but is happy to enable Diana to divorce him. However, James and Diana later agree they could not live together as they are not really suited to each other any more. Diana returns to Bunny and they leave on an extended cruise. Violet delivers a note from Diana via Edward to James: "Thank you for being such a saint. Bless you my darling. Goodbye. D". After James reads this, he tears it up.

== Cast ==
- Gordon Jackson - Hudson
- Angela Baddeley - Mrs Bridges
- Simon Williams - James Bellamy
- Celia Bannerman - Diana Newbury
- Georgina Hale - Violet Marshall
- David Langton - Richard Bellamy
- Christopher Beeny - Edward
- Karen Dotrice - Lily
- Jacqueline Tong - Daisy
- John Quayle - Bunny Newbury
- Tom Chatto - The Waiter
- Mike McKenzie - The Pianist
- John Caesar - The Policeman
