= In Essence =

Canadian musical group

- Origin: Toronto, Ontario, Canada
- Genre: R&B
- Years active: 1993–2006
- Members: Dru; Pops; Smooth; Que; Touch

In Essence (occasionally referred to as I.E.) was a five-member Canadian R&B group based in Toronto, Ontario. Their music has been played both in Canada and the United States. The band was active between 1993 and 2006, and their album The Master Plan was a 2004 Juno Award winner.

== History ==
The group's members, lead singer Dru, Pops, Smooth, Que and Touch met in Toronto in 1993. On a trip to New York City, In Essence met Funkmaster Flex and his manager and in 2001 they were signed to Franchise Entertainment. Shortly thereafter they released the single "You Will Never Find". The song garnered exposure in the US and was included on Funkmaster Flex's The Mix Tape, Vol. IV.

In Essence signed a record deal with ViK. Recordings / BMG Canada and released their first album, The Master Plan, in 2003. The album included an a capella song, "Who We Are". In April 2004, In Essence won a Juno Award for R&B/Soul Recording of the Year for The Master Plan.

In June 2004, same year they were presented with an MMVA Award by MuchMusic for Best R&B Video Of The Year for Friend of Mine. That year the group also won a SOCAN #1 Award for the same video and two Canadian Radio Music Award nominations.

Dru later embarked on a solo career; he released two solo albums, The One (2008) and On the Brink (2011).

== Discography ==
- The Master Plan (2003)
