= Wendy Stapleton =

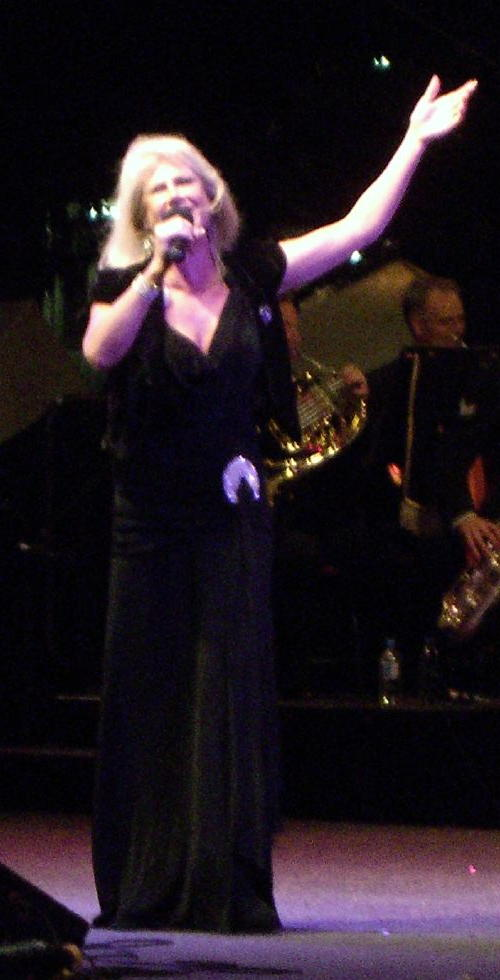
- Stapleton performing at Candles by the Bay in Mordialloc on 16 December 2007

Background information
- Born: Wendy Anne-Marie Stapleton; 8 July 1954 (age 72); Melbourne, Victoria, Australia
- Genres: Pop, rock
- Occupations: Singer; songwriter; actress; TV presenter
- Instrument: Vocals
- Years active: 1966–2003
- Labels: Mushroom, Festival
- Website: wendystapleton.com.au

Wendy Anne-Marie Stapleton (born 8 July 1954) is an Australian singer-songwriter, musical theatre performer and television actress and presenter Stapleton has performed as a backing singer, session musician and a solo artist; she fronted various Melbourne-based groups including Wendy Stapleton Band (1976–1978) and Wendy & the Rocketts (1980–1985) which had a top 30 hit single with "Play the Game" in June 1983.

== Biography ==
=== 1954–1978: Early years ===
Stapleton was born in Melbourne, Victoria. At nine years old, Stapleton appeared in J. C. Williamson’s 1963 production of Noël Coward's Sail Away at Her Majesty's Theatre which starred Maggie Fitzgibbon. In the mid-1960s she regularly performed in further J. C. Williamson productions and made weekly appearances on GTV-9's Tarax Show on Melbourne television. She attended St. Columba's College, in Essendon. From 16 years old, Stapleton was lead vocalist for a succession of bands including Keith McKay Trio (1968), Souled Out (1976–1977), Incession (1979), Southern Transit, Bill Livingstone Trio. She also worked as a session backing vocalist and, during 1976–1978, fronted the Wendy Stapleton Band which included Geoff Cox (ex-Keith McKay Trio, Bootleg Family Band) on drums and backing vocals who was replaced by Mike Anderson (Traction) on drums and backing vocals; and Keith McKay (Keith McKay Trio, Cycle) on keyboards and backing vocals.

=== 1979–1985: Wendy & the Rocketts ===
Stapleton signed a solo deal with Festival Records and issued her debut single, "Heart of Stone", a cover of The Rolling Stones 1964 song, in September 1979. Her version did not chart on the Australian Kent Music Report Singles Chart. In August 1980 Stapleton formed pub rock band, Wendy & the Rocketts, with Mark Chew on guitar and keyboards (ex-Traction, Southern Transit), Victor Crump on guitar (Bandicoot, Fastbuck), Steve Donald on drums (Fastbuck) and Wayne Sullivan on bass guitar (Fastbuck). The band signed with Mushroom Records and released "Reputation" in June 1981, which peaked at No. 40. "Tonite" followed in September but did not chart. Sullivan was replaced by Joe Imbroll on bass guitar.

A new line-up appeared in March 1982 with Donald, and new members: Joey Amenta on lead guitar and backing vocals (Taste, Redhouse, Russell Morris Band, Darryl Cotton Band), Noel Beare on bass guitar (Misfits, Routinos) and Adrian Dessent on rhythm guitar and backing vocals (Scandal, Vixen, Marc Hunter Band). The third single, "Your Place or Mine?" released in March, reached the top 40. A live recording, Live, appeared as a six-track EP in September. The band travelled to UK in early 1983 to record their debut studio album, Dazed for Days it was issued in July and appeared into the top 30 on the Australian Kent Music Report Albums Chart. Lead single, "Play the Game", was released in April and peaked in the top 30, "Have You Been Telling Me Lies" followed in August with "Security" in November. However, by September, the band had left for UK and Europe to tour as support for Bryan Adams and ZZ Top.

In November 1984, another version of Wendy & the Rocketts toured: John Dallimore replaced Amenta on lead guitar (Redhouse, Dallimore, Jon English & the Foster Brothers), Brian Hamilton replaced Beare on bass guitar, and Paul McNaughton (a.k.a. Paul Norton) joined on guitar. No more recordings appeared—the group disbanded in March 1985—and Stapleton returned to session work. Stapleton joined as guest vocalist with The Incredible Penguins in 1985, for a cover of "Happy Xmas (War Is Over)", a charity project for research on little penguins, which peaked at No. 10 on the singles chart in December. Incredible Penguins also included Donald from an early Wendy & the Rocketts line-up.

=== 1986–present: Later years ===
Stapleton's work for the late 1980s includes recording vocals for Dave Evans & Thunder Down Under's releases in 1986, and performing backing vocals for Melbourne band, Wild Turkey, in 1988. She performed in Bad Boy Johnny and the Prophets of Doom, a 1989 musical theatre project with Daniel Abineri, Nadine Garner and Brian Mannix; a soundtrack of the same name was released. Also that year she formed The Glee Club with former bandmates Imbroll and Norton, adding Mark Greig on guitar (ex-The Runners with Norton) and Grant Hamston on drums (The Runners). Other musical theatre appearances include: The Magic Show, Sentimental Bloke and What's Goin' On.

By 1990, Stapleton and Norton were married, and Paul Norton Band was formed with Greig, Norton and Stapleton joined by Tim Millikan (Chantoozies) on bass guitar and Derek Pellicci (Little River Band) on drums to record, Under a Southern Sky and related singles. Yooralla, a disability support provider, recorded an advertising jingle, "Yooralla People Helping People Achieve" in use during 1993–2007, which featured lead vocals by Venetta Fields and John Paul Young with backing vocals by Stapleton and others. In 1994, Greig, Millikan, Norton and Stapleton formed Hillbilly Moon with Cletis Carr (Big Whiskey) on vocals, guitar and bass guitar; and Peter Wells (Rose Tattoo) on vocals, guitar and bass guitar. They released an album, Volume One, on Pelican Records. Stapleton returned to musical theatre in May 1995 with the role of UK entertainer Dusty Springfield in I Only Want to Be With You - The Dusty Springfield Story. Li'l Elvis Jones and the Truckstoppers (1997) was a 26-episode children's television cartoon show on Australian Broadcasting Corporation (ABC), with Stapleton supplying the singing voice for lead character, 'Li'l Elvis Jones' and voice for 'Mama Rig'. She released Li'l Elvis and the TruckStoppers soundtrack in 1998 on ABC Records with eleven tracks. She revived her role as Springfield with another season of I Only Want to Be With You from July 1997, and toured Australia, UK and Europe into early 1998. Stapleton and Norton sang the theme for long running TV series, Neighbours (1985–present) used during 1999–2001 seasons.

In 2001, Stapleton, Debra Byrne and Lisa Edwards toured with Girls, Girls, Girls a tribute show of hits by The Supremes, Cilla Black, Springfield, Patsy Cline and Lulu. After one month, Edwards returned to backing vocals for John Farnham on his The Last Time Tour; she was replaced by Nikki Nicholls, Girls, Girls, Girls continued touring into 2002. Stapleton's television roles include Trixie Tucker, the mother of Nina Tucker played by Delta Goodrem, on Neighbours during 2002 and 2003; other TV roles have been on Blue Heelers (1996, 1999) and Halifax f.p. (1996). Stapleton appeared on film in You Don't Have to Say You Love Me, a short by Terrence O'Connell. During June–August 2006, Norton and Stapleton performed in the Countdown Spectacular alongside other 1970s and 1980s acts. As from February 2008, Stapleton hosted Wrokdown, a weekly TV interview show, on Channel 31.

== Television, theatre and host roles ==
Stapleton's television roles include Trixie Tucker, the mother of Nina Tucker played by Delta Goodrem, on Neighbours during 2002 and 2003. She reprised the role in 2016. Her musical theatre work includes her performance as United Kingdom singer, Dusty Springfield in I Only Want to Be with You in 1995 and 1997–1998. As from February 2008, Stapleton hosted Wrokdown, a weekly TV music interview show, on Channel 31.

== Personal life ==
By 1990, Stapleton had married fellow Melbourne-based singer-songwriter, Paul Norton (previously Paul McNaughton), and they have a daughter, Alexandra, who performs as Ally Mac. Stapleton and Norton regularly performed at Hardimans Hotel in Kensington during 2008. As of August 2026, Stapleton, Norton and Mac provided nostalgic cover versions of 1960s to 1980s artists: Dusty Springfield, Diana Ross, Petula Clark, Lulu, and the Ronettes in their shows.

== Discography ==
Releases by Wendy & the Rocketts unless otherwise indicated.

=== Albums ===
List of albums, with selected details and chart positions
Title	Album details	Peak chart positions
Title	Album details	AUS
Wendy & The Rocketts Live	Released: September 1982; Label: Mushroom Records (L 20019); Mini live album	46
Dazed for Days	Released: October 1982; Label: Mushroom (L 37994)	26

=== Singles ===
List of singles, with selected chart positions
Title	Year	Peak chart positions
Title	Year	AUS
"I Need You" (solo)	1979	—
"Heart of Stone" (solo)	1979	—
"Reputation" / "Let the Boy Go"	1981	40
"Tonite" / "The Brighton Creeper"	1981	—
"Your Place or Mine?" / "In Your Eyes"	1982	35
"Talking to You"	1982	—
"It's Always Maybe"	1982	—
"Play the Game" / "I Can't Tell You"	1983	28
"Have You Been Telling Me Lies" / "How Come You're Still Hanging Around"	1983	75
"Security" / "Nightflier"	1983	—
"C'Mon Demons" (solo with Bob Valentine)	1989	—

== Awards and nominations ==
=== Countdown Australian Music Awards ===
Countdown was an Australian pop music TV series on national broadcaster ABC-TV from 1974–1987, it presented music awards from 1979–1987, initially in conjunction with magazine TV Week. The TV Week / Countdown Awards were a combination of popular-voted and peer-voted awards.

Year	Nominee / work	Award	Result
1982	herself	Most Popular Female Performer	Nominated
