= Shelley Smith (writer) =

English novelist and screenwriter (1912–1998)

Nancey Hermione Bodington (12 July 1912 – 1998), better known under her pen name Shelley Smith, was a British crime writer.

== Life ==
Bodington was born Nancy Courlander, daughter of Leonard Henry and Maud Eva Courlander, in 1912 in Surrey, married Stephen Bodington in 1931, and lived in Steyning, Sussex. She wrote crime novels, mostly under the name Shelley Smith, also short stories and at least one screenplay. She started out with whodunnits featuring Jacob Chaos, a private detective, and moved on to psychological suspense.

== Works ==
- Background for Murder (1942) – Swan, 5/-
- This is the House (1945)
- Death Stalks a Lady (1945)
- Come and Be Killed! (1946)
- He Died of Murder! (1947) – Under her own name
- The Woman in the Sea (1948) – Harper, Possibly earlier
- How Many Miles to Babylon (1950) – Short stories
- The Man With a Calico Face (1951)
- Man Alone (1952) – Hodder & Stoughton (US The Crooked Man, 3 September 1952, Harper)
- An Afternoon to Kill (1953) – Collins
- The Party at No. 5 (1954) – Hodder & Stoughton (US The Cellar at No. 5)
- The Lord Have Mercy (1956) – (US The Shrew Is Dead.)
- Rachel Weeping (1957) – Short stories
- Tiger Bay (1958) – Screenplay, with John Hawkesworth
- The Ballad of the Running Man (1961) – Hodder & Stoughton, the basis for the film The Running Man
- A Grave Affair (1971)
- A Game of Consequences (1978) – Hutchinson
