= Magpie (album) =

Studio album by Stephen Fretwell
- Released: 22 November 2004
- Studio: Abbey Road, London, England
- Genre: Folk rock
- Length: 41:30
- Label: Fiction
- Producer: Stephen Fretwell

Stephen Fretwell chronology
8 Songs (2002)	Magpie (2004)	Man on the Roof (2007)

Magpie is the 2004 debut album by English singer-songwriter Stephen Fretwell. It was released on 22 November 2004 by Fiction Records in England and Universal Music Group worldwide. The album was recorded in studio two of Abbey Road Studios and reached No. 27 on the UK Albums Chart.

== Reception ==
Professional ratings
Review scores
Source	Rating
AllMusic	4/5 stars
BBC	7/10

Magpie was praised by critics. Mars Simpson of Treble called it "Timeless. [...] Manchester's Fretwell, at the tender age of 23, has done what many musicians will attempt to achieve throughout their entire careers but most never do: he's crafted an album that sounds as much at home alongside a great like Bob Dylan as it is next to contemporary singer/songwriters, and should remain relevant as long as people are stepping into soundproof booths and putting sound to tape". Chris Long of the BBC said: "Magpie collects up a host of precious shining moments yet, like the bird it is named after, occasionally doesn't know what to do with them once it has them. It's a firm start but anyone who's watched his progress up the ranks will know there's better than this in him".

== Track listing ==
All tracks are written by Stephen Fretwell.

Magpie track listing
No.	Title	Length
1.	"Do You Want to Come With?"	3:39
2.	"What's That You Say Little Girl"	3:35
3.	"Run"	4:33
4.	"Bad Bad You, Bad Bad Me"	3:26
5.	"Rose"	4:13
6.	"Lost Without You"	2:54
7.	"Emily"	3:36
8.	"Lines"	2:41
9.	"Play"	3:53
10.	"Brother"	3:24
11.	"New York"	2:47
12.	"—"	2:49
Total length:		41:30

== Personnel ==
=== Musicians ===
- Stephen Fretwell – guitar, harmonica, vocals
- Matt Watson – piano, keyboard
- Jonathan Nobblett – bass guitar
- Jay Sikora – drums

=== Technical personnel ===
- Stephen Fretwell – producer
- Guy Massey – engineering, mixing
- Jeff Mac – mixing assistance
- Kris Maclaren – mixing assistance
- Chris Bolster – engineering assistance

== Charts ==
Chart performance for Magpie
Chart (2005)	Peak position
Scottish Albums (OCC)	20
UK Albums (OCC)	27

== Legacy ==
"Run", the first single released from the album, became famous as the theme tune to the British sitcom Gavin & Stacey.
