= Runners (band) =

Australian pop rock band

- Origin: Australia
- Genres: Pop rock
- Years active: 1980–1985
- Labels: Mushroom Records
- Past members: Paul Norton, Mark Edwards, Michael Barclay, Trevor Reading

Runners were a short-lived Australian pop rock band formed in 1980. The group released one studio album which peaked at number 49 on the Australian charts in 1983.

The Runners toured constantly throughout the early eighties and went through many line up changes before disbanding in 1985.

== Discography ==
=== Albums ===
List of studio albums, with Australian positions
| Title | Details | Peak chart positions |
| Title | Details | AUS |
|---|---|---|
| Hitting the Wall | Released: April 1983; Label: Mushroom Records (L 37887); Formats: Cassette, LP | 49 |

=== Singles ===
List of singles, with Australian chart positions
| Year | Title | Peak chart positions | Album |
| Year | Title | AUS | Album |
|---|---|---|---|
| 1982 | "Sure Fire Thing" | 43 | Hitting the Wall |
| 1982 | "Hook Line and Sinker" | - | Hitting the Wall |
| 1983 | "Endlessly (Hitting the Wall)" | 57 | Hitting the Wall |
| 1983 | "Sinai" | - | Hitting the Wall |
| 1984 | "Twins" / "Penny Drops" | - | Hitting the Wall |
