= Simple Forms =

Simple Forms may refer to:

- Simple Forms (album), 2016 studio album by The Naked and Famous
- Simple Forms (book), 1929 book by Andre Jolles
