= The Running Man (1963 film) =

1963 film by Carol Reed

- Directed by: Carol Reed
- Screenplay by: John Mortimer
- Based on: The Ballad of the Running Man; 1961 novel by Shelley Smith
- Produced by: Carol Reed
- Starring: Laurence Harvey; Lee Remick; Alan Bates
- Cinematography: Robert Krasker
- Edited by: Bert Bates
- Music by: William Alwyn
- Color process: Eastman Color
- Production company: Peet Productions
- Distributed by: Columbia Pictures
- Release dates: May 1963 (United Kingdom); October 1963 (United States)
- Running time: 104 minutes
- Countries: United Kingdom; United States
- Language: English

The Running Man is a 1963 British-American neo-noir drama film directed by Carol Reed and starring Laurence Harvey, Alan Bates and Lee Remick. It was adapted by screenwriter John Mortimer from the 1961 novel The Ballad of the Running Man by Shelley Smith.

A man fakes his own death in a glider accident, then runs into trouble when an insurance investigator starts taking a close interest.

== Plot summary ==
Stella Black attends a memorial service for her husband Rex, who "died" in a gliding accident, but whose body was never recovered. In reality, he and Stella are perpetrating insurance fraud to collect £50,000 life insurance as revenge against the same company that refused to pay a previous claim. An insurance investigator, Stephen Maddox, comes to question the “widow,” asking whether Rex might have committed suicide. Rex, who is in hiding, instructs Stella to transfer the insurance payment to a bank in Málaga, Spain, where he will be staying, and then to follow him there.

In Paris, Rex steals the passport of drunken Jim Jerome, a touring Australian sheep rancher, and doctors it with his own photograph.

Arriving in Malaga after receiving the insurance payment, Stella does not like the new arrogance she finds in Rex. He plans to take out a new insurance policy on “Jim Jerome” and once again to fake his death. He gives Stella gold-and-diamond earrings he has insured.

Maddox encounters Stella at an outdoor cafe in Malaga, but she does not immediately recognize him as the agent who interrogated her after Rex's "funeral". Rex believes Maddox's arrival in Spain is too coincidental and he is there to expose the insurance fraud. When Maddox seems to accept Rex as Jim Jerome and shows attraction to Stella, Rex wants to continue to be friendly to see how much Maddox knows. Conversationally, Maddox indicates he is just lonely and eager to associate with fellow tourists, but they are suspicious when they see him taking notes. Stella accuses Rex of liking to take risks. When Rex instructs Stella to get a look at Maddox's notebook, she goes sightseeing with Maddox. Stella confuses a comment she made about “Jim” not liking churches with her late husband Rex not liking churches. After Maddox walks in on Stella searching his room, she pretends she is looking for him and ends up having sex with him to allay his suspicions. Maddox reveals he is no longer working for the insurance company and now works for a paint company. His notes are just tourist observations. A maid knocks on the door, and Stella exclaims that it might be “Rex,” then corrects herself to say “Jim.” Stella loses one of her expensive earrings in Maddox's bed.

Suspecting something amiss, Maddox calls Rex by his real name, but “Jim” corrects him nonchalantly. Maddox comments that he has made business calls to London, fueling Rex's paranoia, and causing him to decide to drop the “Jim Jerome” fraud and leave. Dropping the new scam reassures Stella, as does Rex handing her an envelope with the cashier's check for the Black insurance money. When Maddox assumes that Stella and he are now a couple, Stella warns him not to expect too much. Later, Maddox sees Stella and Rex furtively drive off from the hotel and hurriedly follows them, approaching Gibraltar. While Rex is distracted by a traffic jam caused by a "running-of-the-bulls", Maddox confronts Stella. Resigned that she wants the rich Australian husband, he holds out her earring “so you don’t have to explain to Jim how you lost it”, but Rex interrupts them before she can discreetly take her earring back. Rex invites Maddox to follow them for a farewell drink, driving further up the mountain, but Rex runs Maddox's car off the road. Rex drives on toward the Gibraltar border, but while he is busy with border officials, Stella slips away. Rex chases Stella into a church, accusing her of absconding with the money, and attacks her, but flees when a police officer intervenes. Stella is taken to the police station, where she encounters an alive Maddox, who returns her earring and testifies to police that his plunge off the road was an accident. Rex reaches an air strip, steals a private plane, and escapes. The plane runs out of fuel, falling into the sea. Stella is there for Rex's recovery from the ocean, with a dying Rex lamenting that “Jim Jerome’s” life is not insured. When asked how she knew him, Stella tells police that he was just a man she met on holiday.

== Cast ==
- Laurence Harvey as Rex Black
- Lee Remick as Stella Black
- Alan Bates as Stephen Maddox
- Felix Aylmer as Parson
- Eleanor Summerfield as Hilda Tanner
- Allan Cuthbertson as Jenkins
- Harold Goldblatt as Tom Webster
- Noel Purcell as Miles Bleeker
- Ramsay Ames as Madge Penderby
- Fernando Rey as Police official
- Juanjo Menéndez as Roberto (as Juan Jose Menendez)
- Eddie Byrne as Sam Crewdson
- Colin Gordon as solicitor
- John Meillon as Jim Jerome
- Roger Delgado as Spanish doctor
- Fortunio Bonanova as Spanish bank manager
- Shirley Gale as Florence
- José Calvo as porter (as Jose Calvo)
- Joe Lynch as Roy Tanner
- Freddy Roberts as guide
- Adriano Domínguez as Civil guard (as Adriano Dominguez)
- James Neyland as English customs official
- Pamela Pant as Margaret Webster
- Herbert Curiel as 1st witness
- Antonio Padilla Ruiz as 2nd witness
- Lockwood West as bank manager
- Bob Cummingham as Thomas Guppy
- Ildefonso San Félix as customs official (as Ildefonso San Felix)
- María Granada as Dianne (as Maria Granada)
- Rafael Albaicín as waiter
- Ángel Jiménez as 1st gyspy boy (as Angel Jimenez)
- Juan Jiménez as 2nd gyspy boy (as Juan Jimenez)

== Production ==
In March 1962 it was announced Carol Reed would direct a film based on the novel for Columbia Pictures, who had made Reed's Our Man in Havana. It was the first project Reed worked on since leaving the filming of Mutiny on the Bounty.

It was filmed in San Roque, Cádiz; La Línea de la Concepción, Cádiz; Algeciras, Cádiz; Spain; Gibraltar; and at Ardmore Studios in Ireland.

The film's sets were designed by the art director John Stoll.

The scene depicting a wedding inside a church was an actual real wedding taking place at the time. The couple getting married consented to being filmed during the wedding ceremony. This came about because the script required a wedding scene and the church authorities in Spain would not allow a bogus wedding to be filmed inside the church. The church appearing for this scene is in the town of San Roque.

== Release ==
The film opened at the Odeon Leicester Square in London's West End on 1 August 1963.

== Warren commission ==
The film briefly came to the attention of the Warren Commission investigating the assassination of President John F. Kennedy because of a viral marketing campaign that placed personal ads in the Dallas Morning News asking the "Running Man" to please call "Lee". Investigators thought that these might be coded messages placed by assassin Lee Harvey Oswald until they discovered the source of the advertisements. In Hollywood, an urban legend arose claiming that the film was a flop because it starred actors named Lee and Harvey.

== Reception ==
The Monthly Film Bulletin wrote: "The credits look promising – Reed, Krasker, Mortimer, Alwyn – and an intelligent suspense novel as a foundation: exactly the sort of team from which one might expect a fast, slick thriller. ... But there seems to be something about the panoramic screen, especially when it is coupled with colour, that seduces film-makers into filling it with irrelevant local colour and drawing the whole proceedings out to a length that matches its width. The Running Man begins to conform to this pattern even before it reaches Spain. ... Nevertheless, emphasis remains largely on plot development, but the pace is slow, leaving time during "picturesque" interludes for thought about the absurdities of the story. ... Robert Krasker has photographed all this in glowing Technicolor, but William Alwyn's music seems to have been designed for the lively thriller which has not materialised."

Kine Weekly wrote: "The quietly ironical tone of the whole film is set right at the start at a family gathering after a memorial service to the 'late' Rex Black. The character of Black is also established early and there is no doubt that Laurence Harvey enjoys the creation of this so-charming cad, Rex. His switches from gay abandon to vicious acquisitiveness are done with ease, but he is less at home with his fake Australian accent. By contrast, Lee Remick, as Stella, has little to do but look wide-eyed and worried, but this she does well and does also give occasional hints of deeper capabilities. ... There are times when Carol Reed's direction, particularly of the chase scenes, has almost Hitchcockian flamboyance and the scene where Stephens car is forced over the precipice is produced with exciting realism. The director displays his virtuosity in handling his main characters and the photography takes full advantage of the gaiety of the Spanish backgrounds."

Variety wrote: "The story of the man who poses as dead in order that his "widow" can pick up the insurance money is not exactly new. But a director of Carol Reed's skill can always give the yarn a lift and make it holding entertainment. The Running Man is just that, and with the names of Reed, Laurence Harvey, Lee Remick and Alan Bates as stellar bait this should attract patrons of all classes."

The New York Times published a negative review of the film, with critic Bosley Crowther writing: "Mr. Reed, who used to shine at flight and pursuit melodramas, just doesn't put excitement into this film. He has mostly devoted himself to getting the Malaga atmosphere, and this, in color, is rather dazzling. It's the only thing in the film that is."

Writing in The Los Angeles Times, Philip K. Scheuer praised the film, writing: "Columbia's The Running Man is my idea of an almost perfect motion picture — on-edge anxiety, unpredictable surprises, all astonishingly logical; and always a developing sense of characterization, so that — in contrast to the celebrated Mr. Hitchcock's chases — the final bitterly ironic twist leaves one actually moved with pity and a feeling of loss."

== Awards ==
Cinematographer Robert Krasker — one of Carol Reed's favorites — was nominated for the BAFTA colour cinematography award.

== See also ==
- List of British films of 1963
- List of American films of 1963
