= Run Run Run =

Run Run Run may refer to:

- Run Run Run (band), an American indie rock band
- "Run Run Run" (Celeste Buckingham song)
- "Run Run Run" (High and Mighty Color song), a 2005 song
- "Run Run Run" (Phoenix song), a 2004 song
- "Run Run Run" (Tokio Hotel / Kelly Clarkson song), a song by Tokio Hotel from their 2014 album Kings of Suburbia and Kelly Clarkson from her 2015 album Piece by Piece.
- "Run Run Run" (The Velvet Underground song), a 1967 song
- "Run, Run, Run" (The Supremes song), a 1964 song written by Holland–Dozier–Holland
- "Run Run Run", a song by Concrete Blonde from the 1989 album "Free"
- "Run Run Run", a song by Dragonette from their 2012 album Bodyparts
- "Run Run Run", a song by Goldenhorse from the 2005 album Out of the Moon
- "Run Run Run", a song by Hunters & Collectors from their 1982 debut album Hunters & Collectors
- "Run Run Run", a song by Jo Jo Gunne
- "Run Run Run", a song by The Kinetiks from the 2007 EP High Horse Olympics
- "Run Run Run", a song by The Script from the 2024 album Satellites
- "Run Run Run", a song by Sly and the Family Stone from their 1967 debut album A Whole New Thing
- "Run Run Run", a song by The Third Rail
- "Run Run Run", a song by the Who from the 1966 album A Quick One
- "Run, Run, Run", a song by McKinley Dixon from the 2023 album Beloved! Paradise! Jazz!?
- "Run, Run, Run", a song by The Gestures
- "Run-Run-Run", a song by Natasha Bedingfield from the 2010 album Strip Me
- "Run-Run-Run", a song by The Libertines from the 2024 album All Quiet on the Eastern Esplanade
- "Run Run", a song by Indila from the 2014 album Mini World
- "Run Run", a song by Jolin Tsai from the 2009 album Jeneration
