= Runnin' (Doman & Gooding song) =

Single by Doman & Gooding featuring Dru & Lincoln
- Released: March 8, 2009
- Genre: Hip house
- Length: 3:03
- Label: Positiva
- Producer(s): Doman & Gooding

"Runnin'" is the debut single by Canadian-British dance music duo Doman & Gooding, which also features Canadian R&B singers Dru and Lincoln.

The song samples the 1979 Disco song "Dance with You" by Carrie Lucas and uses the same looped string section made famous by Armand Van Helden in the 1999 song "You Don't Know Me".

== Music video ==
The video was shot in downtown Toronto at CiRCA Night Club, Primarily in the V.I.P. Sections. The first couple scenes shows Lincoln entering the club through the hallway, with friend and fellow Foundation label rapper, Rochester. Another scene shows Dru slow dancing with a woman. For most of the video it shows scenes of people freestyle dancing on the dance floor. Doman & Gooding are seen behind turntables acting as DJs.

== Chart positions ==
"Runnin'" debuted at No. 62 on the Canadian Hot 100 and then peaked at No. 43. In the UK, it reached No. 56.

| Chart (2009) | Peak position |
|---|---|
| Canadian Hot 100 | 43 |
| UK Singles Chart | 56 |
