= List of My Bride Is a Mermaid episodes =

My Bride Is a Mermaid is an anime series adapted from the manga of the same title by Tahiko Kimura. Produced Gonzo and directed by Seiji Kishi, the series aired from April 1 to September 30, 2007, on TV Tokyo in Japan. It follows the adventures of Nagasumi Michishio, a young man who is saved from drowning by a mermaid named Sun Seto. In an attempt to avoid being sentenced to death, the Seto family decides that Nagasumi and Sun are a married couple. The series adapts the first 28 chapters of the manga series, which leads into an original, self-contained story arc for the remainder of the season.

== Episode list ==
The episode titles are related to titles of movies and novels.

No.	Title	Original release date
1	"The Yakuza Wife"; Transliteration: "Gokudō no Onna" (Japanese: 極道の妻)	April 1, 2007
Nagasumi Michishio, a teenage boy, is saved by the mermaid Sun Seto while drowning in the Seto Inland Sea. Despite his parents not believing it, all three are taken by the mermaids where they meet Sun's family. Mermaid laws are incredibly strict and state that Sun must die for allowing Nagasumi to see her mermaid form. Sun's father, Gozaburo Seto, along with most of his yakuza members, prefer to solve the problem by killing Nagasumi. Sun's mother, Ren Seto, suggests that Nagasumi simply marry Sun, since married couples are allowed to know the mermaid secret, thereby avoiding having to kill Sun or Nagasumi. Desperate to avoid being murdered by Sun's father, Nagasumi formally asks for Sun's hand in marriage.
2	"The Lord of the Ring"; Transliteration: "Yubiwa Monogatari" (Japanese: 指輪物語)	April 8, 2007
Nagasumi takes Sun on their first date at the Bon festival, however, not only is Sun's father keeping a very close eye on them, most of the stalls are operated by members of the Seto gang and Nagasumi is almost devoured by gang member Shark Fujishiro. Nagasumi learns from experience that Sun's legs revert to a mermaid tail upon contact with water and must hurry to dry her off before her secret is revealed. This comes with its own risks as Sun's father misunderstands Nagasumi's intentions and almost beheads him. Wanting to do something nice for Sun Nagasumi buys her a glass ring she happily wears on her ring finger. After seeing how happy the ring made her Nagasumi decides to begin taking his relationship with Sun seriously as her future husband.
3	"The Island Closest to Heaven"; Transliteration: "Tengoku ni Ichiban Chikai Shima" (Japanese: 天国に一番近い島)	April 15, 2007
Gozaburo, upset at the thought of losing Sun, hires an assassin to take out Nagasumi. Nagasumi and Sun are invited to spend the day on a deserted island with Sun's childhood friend Maki, who is only a few inches tall. It quickly becomes apparent to Nagasumi that Maki is actually the feared assassin Maki the Conch, who acts sweet and innocent around Sun but attempts to kill Nagasumi whenever Sun is distracted. Maki ends up hesitating after witnessing Nagasumi's chivalrous spirit but still tries to kill him. However Sun, having overheard everything, saves Nagasumi and scolds Maki for trying to kill the man she loves. Sun reveals she is moving to Saitama to live with Nagasumi. On their way to Nagasumi's house it turns out Maki has stowed away in their luggage.
4	"It's Tough Being a Man"; Transliteration: "Otoko wa Tsurai yo" (Japanese: 男はつらいよ)	April 22, 2007
Nagasumi, Sun and Maki arrive in Saitama and begin living together in Nagasumi's parents house. However, Nagasumi is forced to live in the attic, relinquishing his bedroom to Sun and Maki. When Nagasumi's childhood friend Mawari Zenigata tries to stop delinquents harassing schoolgirls Sun also tries to help. Nagasumi is forced to lie to Mawari pretty quickly when Suns legs get wet and revert into a tail again, and also when Maki tries to kill him. Mawari reveals she is the daughter of the Chief of Police and Sun, who is the daughter of a yakuza boss, becomes very nervous about being sent to prison. Mawari, who has a crush on Nagasumi, initially becomes depressed that Nagasumi has a girlfriend but instead decides to devote herself even more to enforcing the rules of society.
5	"School in the Crosshairs"; Transliteration: "Nerawareta Gakuen" (Japanese: 狙われた学園)	April 29, 2007
Sun and Nagasumi attend their first day of school. Sun's parents, Gozaburo and Ren, use their political influence to get jobs at Nagasumi's high school as the homeroom teacher and school nurse respectively, along with Masa teaching maths and Shark Fujishiro teaching PE. To make matters worse, Nagasumi's perverted friend, Hideyoshi "Chimp" Sarutobi, falls in love with Sun. Nagasumi must survive constant attacks from his new so-called teachers except for Masa and Sun's mother, Ren, who supports Nagasumi and Sun's relationship. The next day, to avoid being eaten by Shark Fujishiro Nagasumi escapes through a classroom full of girls changing into their PE clothes and is promptly arrested by Mawari, who had also been changing her clothes. Despite all his suffering Nagasumi remains happy Sun is in his life.
6	"Faibles Femmes"; Transliteration: "Ojō-san Ote Yawaraka ni" (Japanese: お嬢さんお手やわらかに)	May 6, 2007
Mawari accidentally learns Sun lives with Nagasumi and that Sun's parents are also their new teachers. After the Class Rep accidentally spills water on Sun, Mawari briefly notices Sun's tail, coming to the conclusion that Sun is a fish. She continues trying to splash Sun with water in order to verify her theory, but Nagasumi constantly protects Sun, while at the same time trying to stop Mawari from learning the truth so she won't be executed under the mermaid code of law. Mawari next uses cats to try and expose Sun for what she is but when Nagasumi points out how much her actions are upsetting Sun Mawari relents. At that moment Mawari is almost hit by a car and both Nagasumi and Sun save her together. In the hospital Sun ends up getting wet but this time Mawari steps in to prevent Sun's mermaid form being revealed and apologises for causing Sun so much trouble.
7	"V (The Visitors)"; Transliteration: "Bijitā" (Japanese: 来訪者(ビジター))	May 13, 2007
Nagasumi runs into pop-star idol Lunar Edomae who has considered herself Sun's rival since they were children. Lunar's mermaid form is revealed to him during a rainstorm so of course Nagasumi is sentenced to death again. However when Sun admits she had completely forgotten about Lunar, and that Nagasumi is her fiancé, Lunar jealously declares her intention to steal Nagasumi and make him her slave. She also insists on moving into Nagasumi's house and transferring schools to be in Nagasumi and Sun's class. As a celebrity Lunar immediately gains numerous loyal fans among the male students but is further enraged upon realising Sun already has more fans than she does. As the day progresses the Sun Faction and Lunar Faction grow larger and more hostile to each other until eventually the entire school is embroiled in a Sun vs Lunar war.
8	"Duel"; Transliteration: "Gekitotsu" (Japanese: 激突)	May 20, 2007
The war of Sun vs Lunar continues as the girls join the war in support of Mawari and the Disciplinary Committee. They capture Nagasumi, who they blame for starting the war, and insist he choose Sun or Lunar as his girlfriend. After receiving encouragement from the wise and lecherous Chimp Roshi Nagasumi rushes to find Sun. However, upon returning home he realises Maki had been injured by the Lunar Faction and Sun's father is preparing to start a war against Lunar's family, the Edomae gang. Nagasumi arranges for Lunar to face Sun in a singing competition, except war almost breaks out during the contest. Sun uses her Song of the Heroes on Nagasumi, making him immensely powerful and he beats both the Sun and Lunar Factions into submission and forces them to apologise. With Sun declared the winner she demands Lunar apologise for hurting Maki, only for Maki to admit she had accidentally injured herself but was too embarrassed to admit it. With the war over Lunar continues living in Nagasumi's house where Nagasumi's mother proves highly skilled at controlling Lunar's bratty behaviour.
9	"The Running Man"; Transliteration: "Batoru Rannā" (Japanese: バトルランナー)	May 27, 2007
Kai Mikawa, a handsome, rich, but agoraphobic merman of the killer whale variety, crashes his personal submarine into the PE hall and declares that Sun is his fiancé and he has come to rescue her from her kidnapper, Nagasumi, and offers Nagasumi an obscene amount of money to hand Sun over. Nagasumi angrily refuses and during their fight Kai is exposed to the outdoors rendering him unable to fight. Kai later transfers into Nagasumi and Sun's class and challenges Nagasumi to beat him at the sports festival for Sun's hand in marriage. Despite Kai winning a footrace both Sun and Lunar argue over Nagasumi and ignore Kai completely. During the last race that will determine who wins Sun's hand it starts raining and Kai transforms into his killer whale form and loses the race. His challenge against Nagasumi is declared a draw.
10	"Pumping Iron"; Transliteration: "Kōtetsu no Otoko" (Japanese: 鋼鉄の男)	June 3, 2007
A man perceived by his immense strength and overwhelming endurance, later revealed as Lunar's father and boss of the Edomae gang, stalks Nagasumi, threatening to kill him if he doesn't take good care of Lunar. Nagasumi tries to tell his friends, but initially no one believes the man exists. Eventually Nagasumi runs into Kai and they both start running for their lives. Sun eventually finds Nagasumi and attempts to prevent Lunar's father from attacking him. Gozaburo starts a fight with Lunar's father for almost hurting Sun. After fighting each other to a draw Lunar's father talks briefly with Lunar then leaves by disappearing into a nearby vat of molten steel. This episode is a slight parody of Terminator 2: Judgment Day and Total Recall. An after credits scene reveals Maki has been locked in a cage by Gozaburo because of her actions in episode 8.
11	"Armageddon"; Transliteration: "Arumagedon" (Japanese: アルマゲドン)	June 10, 2007
Lunar has gained weight and insists that Sun go on a diet with her and buys exercise equipment and dietary supplements for mermaids through the Seto home shopping channel and builds a gym in Nagasumi's house. Nagasumi drinks an entire bottle of mineral water designed for mermaids and immediately grows to an enormous height, destroying his parents house. Attempts are made to restrain Nagasumi, including wrestling with Octopus Nakajima and being hit in the groin with Kai's submarine. When that fails Kai uses his NASA contacts to launch Nagasumi to the moon and blows him up with rockets. Nagasumi survives and Sun's mother arrives with the Neptune Lance, a magical item from the Seto home shopping channel that can fix physical flaws. Sun eventually succeeds in throwing the lance to the moon where it hits and cures Nagasumi, shrinking him to normal size and returning him to earth. After reuniting with Sun Nagasumi is punished by his father for destroying their house.
12	"A Slave of Love"; Transliteration: "Ai no Dorei" (Japanese: 愛の奴隷)	June 17, 2007
Lunar is failing all her school subjects and risks having to repeat the school year. She insists Nagasumi tutor her while alone together but ends up spilling water on herself, transforming her legs into a tail. While Nagasumi dries her with a towel Lunar's father walks in just in time for Lunar's tail to have reverted into legs and witnesses Nagasumi seemingly fondling her nude butt. Lunar's father prepares to personally drown Nagasumi in the ocean until Lunar stops him by admitting she loves Nagasumi. Lunar's father immediately imprisons Nagasumi and begins planning his wedding to Lunar, upsetting Sun, who is determined to get Nagasumi back.
13	"Love Story"; Transliteration: "Aru Ai no Uta" (Japanese: ある愛の詩)	July 1, 2007
Nagasumi is taken to Lunar's house to be married. Sun becomes depressed over failing to be a good wife, and while Lunar realises Sun and Nagasumi do love each other she stubbornly continues with her plan to marry Nagasumi and finally win against Sun. At the wedding as Nagasumi is about to become Lunar's husband, he voices his disapproval of forcing people not truly in love to get married, and promptly refuses to continue. Suddenly, Sun appears and voices her own disagreement with the wedding and uses her sword skills to defeat Lunar's guards and announces her love for Nagasumi. In the end, Sun and Nagasumi get back together while Sun and Lunar must work together to prevent a war from breaking out between their families.
14	"Koneko Monogatari (The Adventures of Chatran)"; Transliteration: "Koneko Monogatari" (Japanese: 子猫物語)	July 8, 2007
Nagasumi finds a kitten and brings it to school, discovering that Sun, Lunar, and Maki are all morbidly ailurophobic, including Sun's father, Gozaburo. Nagasumi decides to use this to finally get the upper hand on Gozaburo and carries the kitten around with him all day. Unwilling to lose to Nagasumi Gozaburo calls in his three elite mermaid guard, triplet brothers Maguro, Burio, and Ajitaro. The trio transfer into Nagasumi's class and make several attempts to beat him up. However they are also afraid of cats and run away. In the ensuing chaos, a fearful Gozaburo pulls the fire alarm, evacuating the school. Gozaburo and his guard next target Nagasumi's secret weapon, the kitten, by hurling it into the river where it ends up being rescued by Maki. Gozaburo and the brothers are all severely punished by Sun's mother, Ren, for causing all sorts of trouble. The episode ends with the kitten licking Maki, who is less than thrilled.
15	"What's Your Name?"; Transliteration: "Kimi no Na wa" (Japanese: 君の名は)	July 15, 2007
Nagasumi, Sun, Lunar, Mawari, Chimp, and Mikawa go on what is supposed to be a double date. As Nagasumi goes to get a juice ordered by Lunar, he accidentally bumps into the Class Rep in an intersection, whom he doesn't recognize. It is now known that the Class Rep has a crush on Nagasumi. Nagasumi accidentally steps on and breaks her glasses so she doesn't recognize him. After she gets new ones she recognizes Nagasumi and runs away. As soon as he catches up and asks her name she runs away again saying she will tell him the next time they meet.
16	"Minority Report"; Transliteration: "Mainoriti Repōto" (Japanese: マイノリティ·レポート)	July 22, 2007
A new student, Akeno Shiranui, transfers into the class. Akeno reveals herself as a mermaid examiner who has come to observe mermaids who live among humans and, if they are deemed incapable of keeping the existence of mermaids a secret, banishing them back to the ocean. She then begins her examination of Sun, who, terrified of being made to leave Nagasumi, tries desperately to act like a human. Despite several setbacks Sun is on the verge of passing her exam when she accidentally spills water on herself, transforming her legs into a tail in the middle of class. Akeno renders the witnesses unconscious and prepares to strike Sun with her "Blow of Failure", but Sun expertly defends herself with Kai's sword. Despite failing her exam Akeno decides to allow Sun to stay in the human world until she manages to finally strike her with the Blow of Failure.
17	"Cops vs. Thugs"; Transliteration: "Kenkei Tai Soshiki Bōryoku" (Japanese: 県警対組織暴力)	July 29, 2007
Defeated by Akeno, a group of delinquent lords follow her around, which misleads Mawari into believing Akeno was also a delinquent. In order to protect the society, Mawari decides to go all out against Akeno. Meanwhile, the Seto Gang also plot their own plan against Akeno. Though Sun finally convinces Mawari to rethink of the situation, the unstoppable clashes has already begun.
18	"Gate of Flesh"; Transliteration: "Nikutai no Mon" (Japanese: 肉体の門)	August 5, 2007
The whole class takes a sudden field trip to Kyoto. After an incident where Maki attacked Akeno, Sun apologizes to her, but Akeno issues her interest in Sun's mermaid body and asks her permission to investigate them at the bathroom. Unbeknown to them, Nagasumi and Mawari misheard this conversation and issue an investigation of their own.
19	"There's No Business Like Show Business"; Transliteration: "Shō Hodo Suteki na Shōbai wa Nai" (Japanese: ショウほど素敵な商売はない)	August 12, 2007
After the attempt to separate Nagasumi and Sun apart from each other collapses, Akeno undertakes a mission to foil Nagasumi by forcing him to gulp down a mermaid beverage, which will release mortals of their strongest desires, thus forcing Sun to break away from Nagasumi. The plan falters, however, when everyone except Nagasumi partook of the drink.
20	"A Better Tomorrow"; Transliteration: "Otokotachi no Banka" (Japanese: 男たちの挽歌)	August 19, 2007
Lunar's Papa searches for ways to express his love and cheer up his precious daughter when he accidentally spots a bishōjo game from a search engine. Armed with his newfound knowledge, Lunar's Papa convinces Gōzaburō about learning the significance of a daughter's heart with the bishōjo game as a resource. However, things begin to get out of hand when they both embark on cross-dressing, causing havoc within the school.
21	"10 Things I Hate About You"; Transliteration: "Koi no Karasawagi" (Japanese: 恋のからさわぎ)	August 26, 2007
Nagasumi receives a love letter from the Class Rep and becomes instantly overjoyed, as it is his first love letter he has ever received in his life due to lack of popularity. Maki confiscates the love letter from Nagasumi's pocket, and Lunar recites it aloud for all to realize. After Ren finds out that Nagasumi only wants to be more popular, she gives him a sample of a potion to temporarily solve the issue. However, this causes all females who see him to fall in love with him and all males who see him to develop envy against him.
22	"Privilege"; Transliteration: "Kizu Darake no Aidoru" (Japanese: 傷だらけのアイドル)	September 2, 2007
Lunar induces Sun to help play a role of her lover as part of a soap opera. However, Sun goes overboard and eventually ceases from her role-playing. Afterwards, Lunar applies to be in the parlor trick competition and has to practice ventriloquism, using Maki as her puppet. However, Akeno tries to prevent Lunar from going to competition as a precaution that Maki might be revealed.
23	"The Man Without a Past"; Transliteration: "Kako no Nai Otoko" (Japanese: 過去のない男)	September 9, 2007
Believing Masa was an acquaintance of her older brother, Akeno asks Masa about her brother's whereabouts, but Masa had lost his memories before joining the Seto Gang. Gōzaburō then reveals to Nagasumi that Akeno's brother is actually Masa himself. While unaware of this fact, Akeno intends to punish her brother for his irresponsibility, forcing Nagasumi to protect Masa using any methods available. Gōzaburō forces Masa into a comatose state, in which he is able to recover his memories about his sister.
24	"Farewell, Friend"; Transliteration: "Saraba Tomo yo" (Japanese: さらば友よ)	September 16, 2007
Mikawa has an embarrassing problem about himself that he wants to keep a secret from others, inasmuch as a blemish on his backside. However, Chimp passes by the hospital where Mikawa had gone to pick up his medication, and eavesdrops on the doctor and nurse, mistaking they were discussing about how Mikawa has an incurable disease. This drives Chimp to inform the others. Heartbroken yet dumbfounded, they all try to give Mikawa the best time of his life during his final yet unforeseen moments.
25	"The Family Game"; Transliteration: "Kazoku Gēmu" (Japanese: 家族ゲーム)	September 23, 2007
Nagasumi and Sun have a quarrel, questioning the status of their relationship. This leads to nonchalance for each other. Meanwhile, the Seto Family and Gang are summoned to a reception hosted by an aristocrat named Yoshiuo Minamoto, incognizant of the pitfall in store for them. It is shown that Akeno is an accomplice with Yoshiuo.
26	"Antwone Fisher (The Place Where You Go Home To)"; Transliteration: "Kimi no Kaeru Basho" (Japanese: きみの帰る場所)	September 30, 2007
Nagasumi, Lunar, Chimp, and Mikawa proceed to rescue the Seto Family and Gang. As they infiltrate the estate, Nagasumi learns that Yoshiuo is planning to marry Sun, using vulgar actions such as drugging her first, much to his dismay. Akeno, realizing the wrongdoing she has caused, decides to fight against Yoshiuo. The Seto Family and Gang manage to bail out and participate in battling Yoshiuo's personal army, joined by Mikawa, Lunar and Lunar's father. Nagasumi collides with Yoshiuo in an attempt to save Sun, originally overpowered at first. But with the power of love and self-respect he receives from Sun, Nagasumi is able to defeat Yoshiuo. Not only does he expose Yoshiuo's mermaid form, a disgustingly fat catfish, but he also tells Sun he loves her and asks her to stay with him forever, to which she happily accepts. The anime ends with Nagasumi and friends returning to a normal day at school, surprising some with his more "manly" persona, as Sun is wearing a ring given to her by Nagasumi on their first date like a wedding ring.

== OVAs ==
No.	Title	Original release date
1	"Jin" (Japanese: 仁)	November 28, 2008
A new semester begins where Nagasumi, Sun and the others are third grader seniors. Everyone got into the same class except Nagasumi got sent to the eighth middle school, class zero where in a classroom full of delinquents. Unable to cooperate with his new class, their homeroom teacher Shark Fujishiro plans to make a killing spree session on his first day of homeroom. Meanwhile, a new student has come to Sun and Lunar's class who turns out to be Lunar's Papa who is dressed in a female middle school attire along with an apron. This disgusts Lunar and makes a whole ruckus in the class. When Seto Gozaburo asks them to quiet down, Lunar's father tells him to not interfere and the two start a fight. Lunar and Sun leave to find Nagasumi and get him back to his seat to clear their situation. The second half of the episode features Nagasumi and Sun going on a date to the cinema to see Chivalry Death 4 starring Bunta Willis (clearly modeled on the Die Hard series), they meet Satori, Chimp's younger sister, who is also a fan of the movies, and she takes an instant dislike to Nagasumi. Nagasumi ends up rescuing her from the cinema after it catches fire from a crashed tanker truck, in true Hollywood action movie style, much improving her opinion of him.
2	"Gi" (Japanese: 義)	January 30, 2009
The first half of the episode has Shiranui working in a maid cafe to pay off the damage she did to the store. Sun, Mawari, Satori and Lunar offer to work there also, and a 'competition' begins between the four. At the end, the store is destroyed again. The second half of the episode starts with a flashback scene from when Sun was a child, playing with her friend, and they make a promise. Then, Lunar and Nagasumi are watching a horror movie in the house while the others are out. Lunar freaks out and a zombie girl appears in the house. A few things happen, and the so-called zombie girl tells Nagasumi that 'It's all your fault.' The next day at school, she appears again and attacks all of the students except Lunar, who cowers in the corner. Sun returns and finds that the zombie girl is her childhood friend, Saturn. Saturn leaves, and they make a promise once more.
