= John Hawkesworth (producer) =

English producer and screenwriter (1920–2003)

- Born: 7 December 1920; London, England
- Died: 30 September 2003 (aged 82); Leicester, Leicestershire, England
- Education: University of Paris; University of Oxford
- Occupations: Television producer, screenwriter
- Spouse: Hyacinth Gregson-Ellis

John Stanley Hawkesworth (7 December 1920 – 30 September 2003) was an English television and film producer and screenwriter, best known for his work on the period drama Upstairs, Downstairs and the Granada Television adaptation of Sherlock Holmes.

== Early life ==
Hawkesworth was born in London on 7 December 1920, the son of the-then Captain J. L. I. Hawkesworth, a British Army officer who rose to the rank of lieutenant general and who had fought in the First World War (1914–1918), and Helen Jane Hawkesworth (née McNaughton). He was educated at Rugby, the Sorbonne and Oxford. During the Second World War (1939–1945) he was commissioned as a second lieutenant, in 1941, into the 4th Battalion, Grenadier Guards and served with it throughout the North-West Europe Campaign of 1944–45. He left the army with the rank of captain in 1946. In the late 1940s Hawkesworth began his film career as an assistant to art director Vincent Korda working with him on The Fallen Idol (1948). He also worked on films such as The Third Man (1949), Outcast of the Islands (1951) and The Sound Barrier (1952).

== Career ==
By the mid-1950s, Hawkesworth was an independent designer, and films he worked on included The Prisoner (1955). He soon joined Rank as a trainee producer, and qualified as an associate producer while working on the film Windom's Way (1957). For the film Tiger Bay (1959), he was the producer and wrote the screenplay with Shelley Smith. In the mid-1960s, he began to work for television, and he wrote the scripts for programmes including The Hidden Truth (1964), The Short Stories of Conan Doyle (1967) and The Gold Robbers (1969).

After Jean Marsh and Eileen Atkins came up with an idea for a period comedy featuring two maids, Hawkesworth, along with John Whitney, turned the idea into the success that became Upstairs, Downstairs. He went on to produce 65 out of the 68 episodes from 1971 to 1975. He also wrote 12 episodes and some of the novelisations. Following this, he produced the BBC drama The Duchess of Duke Street (1976–77), and created as well as produced the 1979 Euston Films series Danger UXB (1979) for Thames Television. During the 1980s, he produced many television programmes including By the Sword Divided (1983), The Adventures of Sherlock Holmes (1984) and Oscar (1985).

== Later years ==
Hawkesworth's final work was writing the screenplay for the comedy-drama Mrs. 'Arris Goes to Paris (1992). He was married to Hyacinth Gregson-Ellis. They had two children. In his biography of the television producer Verity Lambert, Richard Marson describes Hyacinth as "fiercely snobbish", and as someone who "answered to the unlikely nickname 'Pussy'". Pussy occasionally accompanied Hawkesworth to meetings. In his retirement, he spent much time painting. He died in Leicester in 2003 aged 82.
