= Mount St. Mary's =

Mount St. Mary's and other forms of the name may refer to:

== Higher education ==
Mount Saint Mary College

- Mount St Mary's College, Spinkhill, a private school situated at Spinkhill, Derbyshire, England, closed in 2025
- Mount Saint Mary College (New York), a private college in Newburgh, New York
- Mount Saint Mary College (New Hampshire), a defunct private college for women, in Hooksett, New Hampshire (closed 1978)
- Mount St Mary Campus of the Australian Catholic University, Sydney, Australia

Mount St. Mary's University

- Mount St. Mary's University (Maryland), a private liberal arts university in Emmitsburg, Maryland
- Mount Saint Mary's University (Los Angeles), a private liberal arts college, primarily for women, in Los Angeles

== Secondary education ==
Mount Saint Mary Academy

- Mount Saint Mary Academy (Kenmore, New York)
- Mount St. Mary Academy (Little Rock, Arkansas)
- Mount St. Mary Academy (Watchung, New Jersey)
- Mount Saint Mary's Convent and Academy, Grass Valley, California

Mount St. Mary's School

- Mount St Mary's School (New Delhi), the same school as above
- Mount St. Mary High School (Oklahoma), a private high school in Oklahoma City, United States
- Mount St Mary's Catholic High School, Leeds, United Kingdom

Mount St Mary's College

- Mount St Mary's College (England)
- Mount Saint Mary's College Namagunga, an all-girl boarding school near Lugazi, Uganda

== Seminaries ==
- Mount St. Mary's Seminary of the West, a seminary and a division of the Athenaeum of Ohio, in Cincinnati
- Mount St. Mary's Seminary and College, now part of Mount St. Mary's University, in Emmitsburg, Maryland

== Other uses ==
- Mount Saint Mary's Hospital in Lewiston, New York, United States
- St Mary's Church, Walsall, also known as St Mary's the Mount Church, West Midlands, United Kingdom
- Mount St Mary's Church, Leeds, West Yorkshire, United Kingdom
- St. Mary's Mount, an alternate name for the eastern spires of Mission Ridge (British Columbia), Canada
- Mount Saint Mary, a mountain in Slovenia
