= St Saviour Church, Richmond Hill =

St Saviour
- St Saviour Church
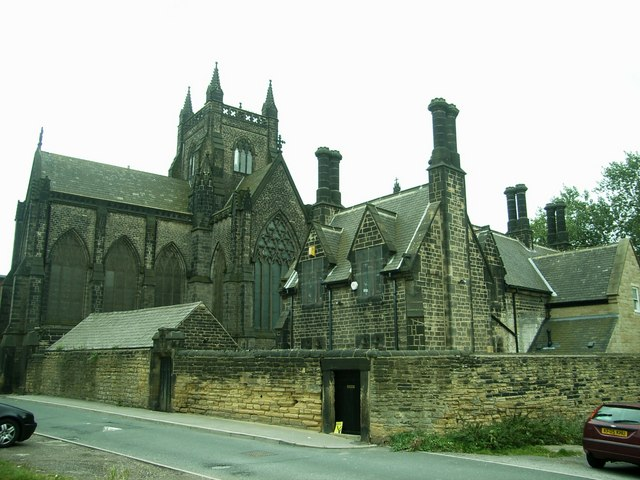
- St Saviour
- 53.7918°N 1.526°W
- OS grid reference: SE 31291 32953
- Location: Richmond Hill, Leeds
- Country: England
- Denomination: Anglican
- Churchmanship: Anglo-Catholic

History
- Status: Parish church

Architecture
- Heritage designation: Grade I listed
- Designated: 26 September 1963
- Architect: John Macduff Derick
- Architectural type: Church
- Style: Gothic Revival architecture
- Groundbreaking: 1842
- Completed: 1845

Specifications
- Materials: Dressed stone

Administration
- Diocese: Diocese of Leeds
- Archdeaconry: Archdeaconry of Leeds
- Deanery: East Leeds
- Parish: Richmond Hill

Clergy
- Priest: The Reverend Jonathan Fleury

St Saviour Church in Richmond Hill, Leeds, West Yorkshire, England is an active Anglican parish church in the archdeaconry of Leeds and the Diocese of Leeds.

== History ==
The church was built between 1842 and 1845 to designs by architect John Macduff Derick. The church was anonymously funded by Edward Bouverie Pusey, Regius Professor of Hebrew at Oxford, a leading advocate of the Oxford Movement. A tall spire, modelled on the spire of St Mary's, Oxford and pinnacles along the eaves were not built. The building was Grade I listed on 26 September 1963.

=== Present day ===
The parish stands in the Anglo-Catholic tradition of the Church of England.

The Church exclusively uses the 1662 Book of Common Prayer for all main services, it is currently the only Church in Leeds to do so.

== Architectural style ==
The church is built in a Gothic revival style of dressed stone with ashlar dressings. It has a central tower. The church has four five-light windows described by Pevsner as being 'of great merit, in the style of the 13th century and in glowing colour, nothing yet of Victorian insipidity'.

== Gallery ==
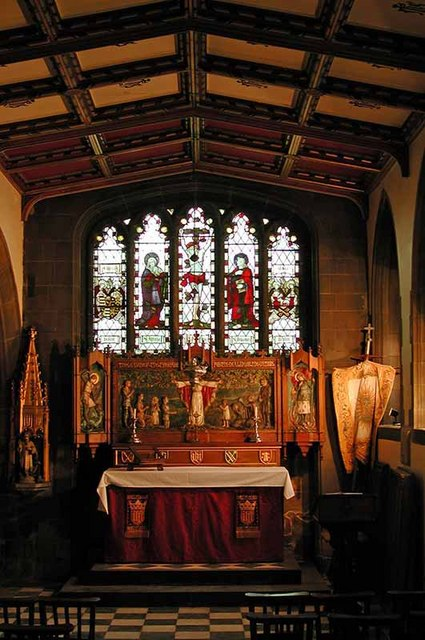
Altar

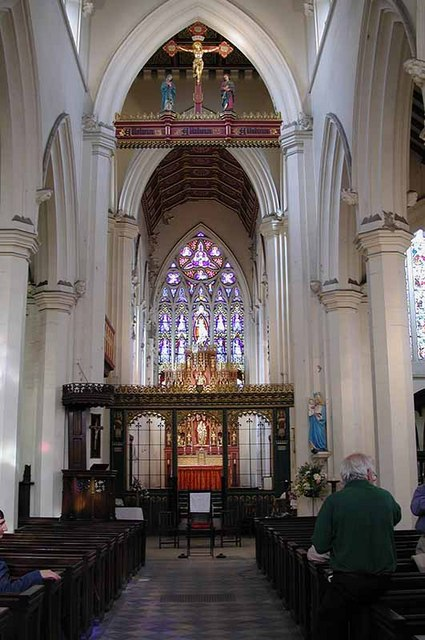
East End

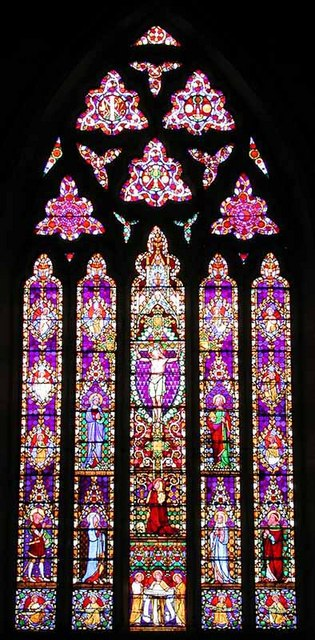
Window

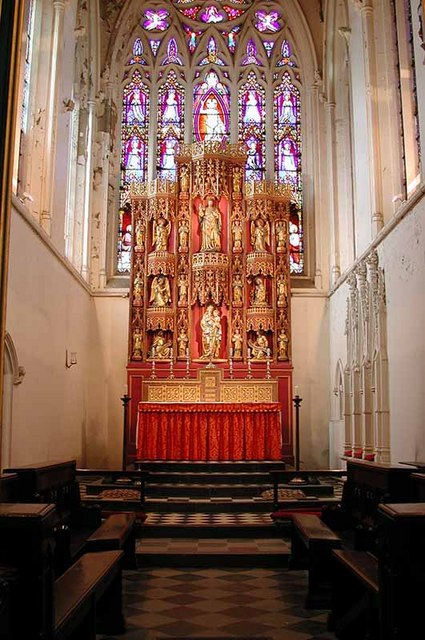
Chancel

== See also ==
- List of places of worship in the City of Leeds
- Grade I listed buildings in West Yorkshire
- Grade I listed churches in West Yorkshire
- Listed buildings in Leeds (Burmantofts and Richmond Hill Ward)
