= Just like a Woman (1967 film) =

1967 British film by Robert Fuest

Just Like a Woman
- British quad poster
- Directed by: Robert Fuest
- Written by: Robert Fuest
- Produced by: Bob Kellett (as Robert Kellett)
- Starring: Wendy Craig; Francis Matthews; John Wood
- Cinematography: Billy Williams
- Edited by: Jack Slade
- Music by: Kenny Napper
- Production company: Dormar Productions Limited
- Distributed by: Monarch Film Corporation (UK)
- Release date: 26 February 1967 (UK)
- Running time: 89 minutes
- Country: United Kingdom
- Language: English

Just like a Woman is a 1967 British comedy film written and directed by Robert Fuest and starring Wendy Craig, Francis Matthews, John Wood, Dennis Price and Clive Dunn. A wealthy couple working in the entertainment industry decide to separate, but soon begin to miss each other.

== Cast ==
- Wendy Craig as Scilla Alexander
- Francis Matthews as Lewis McKenzie
- John Wood as John Martin
- Dennis Price as bathroom salesman
- Miriam Karlin as Ellen Newman
- Peter Jones as Saul Alexander
- Clive Dunn as Graf von Fischer
- Ray Barrett as Australian
- Sheila Steafel as Isolde
- Aubrey Woods as T.V. floor manager
- Barry Fantoni as Elijah Stark
- Juliet Harmer as Lewis's girl friend
- Mark Murphy as singer
- Michael Brennan as commissionaire
- Angela Browne as Scilla's friend

== Production ==
The films director Robert Fuest, later went on to direct Wuthering Heights.

== Critical reception ==
The Monthly Film Bulletin wrote: "Another attempt, more laborious than most, to catch the style and insouciance of de Broca and the like. Few of the guest appearances escape an incongruity between timeworn personality routines and all the nouvelle vague trappings, though Miriam Karlin is pleasingly astringent as the hero's secretary. It's the archness of the thing that really appals, however."

In the Radio Times, David Parkinson wrote, "Craig here reveals the comic flair that enabled her to become the epitome of scatty domesticity in sitcoms like Not in Front of the Children and Butterflies. Fuest's script strives too hard to be offbeat, however, notably in the creation of a goose-stepping interior designer."
