= Alfred Harris (Upstairs, Downstairs) =

- Alfred Harris (left)
- First appearance: "On Trial" (1971)
- Last appearance: "Rose's Pigeon" (1973)
- Created by: Upstairs, Downstairs
- Portrayed by: George Innes

In-universe information
- Gender: male
- Occupation: Footman
- Significant other: Baron Klaus von Rimmer
- Religion: Christian

Alfred Harris (1868–1913), is a fictional character of the British television series, Upstairs, Downstairs. He was portrayed by George Innes.

== Plot ==
Alfred Harris was the original footman at Eaton Place from 1895. He was raised in a religious home and he frequently quotes the Bible, though sometimes inaccurately. He puts on a show of great piety, and often preaches unwanted advice to the other servants. Alfred initially showed romantic interest in the maid Sarah Moffat when she first arrived, but nothing came of it. Later, in 1905, Rose, the head house parlourmaid, discovers Alfred in a sexual situation with an upstairs guest, Baron Klaus von Rimmer. Before the police can arrive to arrest them, Alfred flees Eaton Place with the Baron and becomes his valet.

In 1913, Alfred returns to Eaton Place seeking refuge. He claims to have been sacked by his most recent employer (a Lithuanian man) and is homeless. Rose is shocked to see him, but she agrees to hide him in a basement room. Later, Rose is horrified to discover that Alfred is actually on the run from the police for murdering his previous employer and (it is implied) lover. Hudson tells Mr Bellamy, who notifies the police. A dramatic standoff results, with Alfred taking the footman Edward hostage in the coal cellar. Alfred is arrested and subsequently hanged for murder, although Rose protests against the sentence, arguing it was not right to do so to a person 'who's not right in the head.'

== Childhood ==
Whilst much isn't known about Alfred's origins, we can infer that he was incredibly poor and in need of work. Within the series he has no real family to speak of and certainly doesn't wish to see them. He is also very religious which we first see in the first episode of the series, "On Trial". It can be assumed that he had quite a troublesome upbringing due to the way his character is in the show — which may have something to do with his sexuality in being a closeted gay man.

== "The Lithuanian" ==
Within season 3 episode 5 "Rose's Pigeon" it is implied that Alfred has been raped by his Lithuanian employer which has steered him into madness. When the police come to arrest him for murder, he says that "they don't know what happened really" and that they already "think [he's] guilty." He believes himself to be the "scum of the earth crawling on its belly" which is possibly further hinting towards the assault by describing himself as filthy with the pain that has been inflicted upon him. He calls the baron's friend "vile and disgusting" as well as his Lithuanian employer "pushing [him] to grovel" in front of him "like a servant." When Alfred describes the events, he says "I always wanted to be decent..." and "I just wanted to get away back to this life, anything!" which would always be followed up with "but he wouldn't let me" and "he would just laugh at me." Alfred, within the scenes of Rose's Pigeon, is showing multiple signs of PTSD - a disorder which is linked to a stressful event in which his heavily implied sexual assault would certainly come under. Whilst Alfred suffered with this illness, no one would have believed him in society as they would have assumed he was in a homosexual relationship which was illegal at the time.

== Controversy ==
The episode "A Suitable Marriage" was very controversial. In the episode's time setting, homosexuality was illegal in Britain, and was not decriminalized until 1967. The actors Baron Klaus von Rimmer (Horst Janson) and Alfred Harris (George Innes) also did things in the episode that did not make it to air: "The episode was considered too controversial for American TV (at any time of the day or night), even though in Britain it got an afternoon repeat in 1973. Nevertheless, events in the episode never got to the stage shown in the lower photo, which is presumably the actors messing around!"

== See also ==
- List of Upstairs, Downstairs (1971 TV series) characters
