= Leonard Trolley =

English actor (1918–2005)

- Leonard Trolley as Mr. Arthur Forrest in Upstairs, Downstairs
- Born: Leonard Trolley; 1 January 1918; Bristol, England
- Died: 10 February 2005 (aged 87); Cobham, Surrey, England
- Occupation: Actor
- Years active: 1947–1990

Leonard Trolley (1 January 1918 – 10 February 2005) was an English actor, who is best known for playing Arthur Forrest in "A Family Secret", the fourth episode of the third series of the British television series, Upstairs, Downstairs.

He is also known for Tales of Unease, ('Suspicious Ignorance', episode), The Message, Rise and Fall of Idi Amin, A Countess from Hong Kong, Bergerac, The Mayor of Casterbridge, The Stud, Consuming Passions, In the Shadow of Kilimanjaro, Champions, Doctor Who (in the serial The Faceless Ones), Prelude to Fame and Z-Cars.

== Partial filmography ==
- Prelude to Fame (1950) - Waiter
- A Countess from Hong Kong (1967) - Purser
- One of Our Dinosaurs Is Missing (1975) - Inspector Eppers
- The Message (1976) - Silk Merchant
- The Stud (1978) - Doctor (uncredited)
- Rise and Fall of Idi Amin (1981) - Bob Astles
- Champions (1984) - Steward
- In the Shadow of Kilimanjaro (1986) - Colonel Maitland
- Consuming Passions (1988) - The Mayor
