= Rose's Pigeon =

- Upstairs, Downstairs episode
- Episode no.: Season 3 Episode 5
- Directed by: Derek Bennett
- Written by: Alfred Shaughnessy
- Original air date: 24 November 1973

Guest appearances
- George Innes (Alfred Harris); Leon Sinden (Det. Inspector Bowles); Bernard Barnsley (Police Sergeant)

Episode chronology
← Previous "A Family Secret"	Next → "Desirous of Change"

"Rose's Pigeon " is the fifth episode of the third series of the British television series, Upstairs, Downstairs. The episode is set in 1913.

== Plot ==
In 1906: Rose catches footman Alfred Harris and German Baron Klaus von Rimmer having sexual relations. The men flee to Germany after Alfred discovers the Baron is to be arrested as a spy, and tips him off. (Note: As depicted in "A Suitable Marriage")

In the present year 1913: Alfred Harris returns to the house Eaton Place in 1913 seeking refuge after murdering his new employer and (it is implied) lover. Rose, the head house parlour maid, is shocked when Alfred turns up at Eaton Place one night. He claims he's been sacked by his former employer and is homeless. She agrees to hide him in one of the basement rooms, but is horrified when it later transpires Alfred is actually on the run from the police, having murdered his previous employer. Hudson tells Mr Bellamy, who notifies the police. A dramatic standoff results, with Alfred holding Edward hostage at knifepoint in the coal cellar. Alfred is arrested and subsequently hanged for murder, although Rose protests against the sentence's severity, arguing it was not right to do so to a person "who's not right in the 'ead."

== Cast ==
- George Innes (Alfred Harris)
- Leon Sinden (Det. Inspector Bowles)
- Bernard Barnsley (Police Sergeant)

== Background ==
"Rose's Pigeon" was recorded by the best tube cameras: EMI 2001S.

== See also ==
- A Suitable Marriage
