= Francis Matthews (actor) =

English actor (1927–2014)

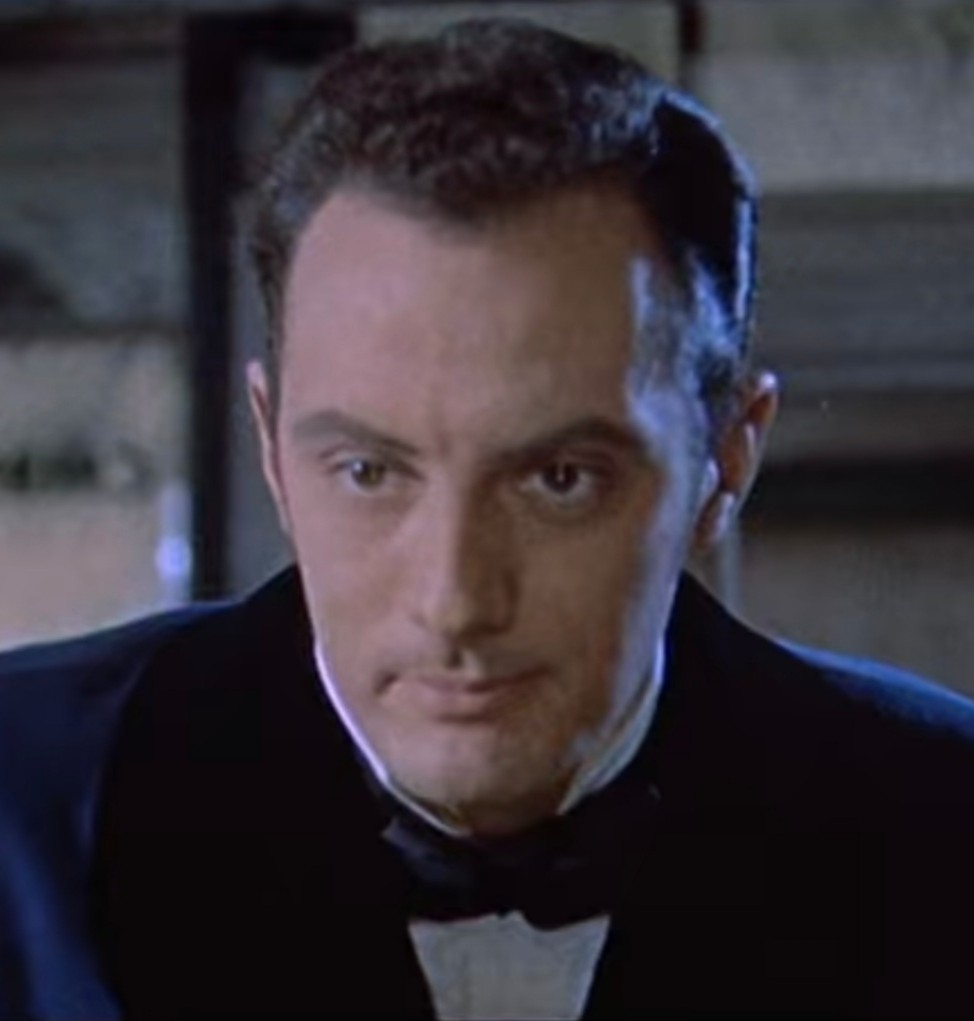
- Matthews as Doctor Hans Kleve in The Revenge of Frankenstein
- Born: 2 September 1927; York, England
- Died: 14 June 2014 (aged 86); London, England
- Education: St Michael's Jesuit College, Leeds
- Occupation: Actor
- Years active: 1951–2012
- Spouse: Angela Browne (m. 1963; died 2001)
- Children: 3
- Relatives: Paul Shelley (brother); Maura Matthews (sister)

Francis Matthews (2 September 1927 – 14 June 2014) was an English actor, best known for playing Paul Temple in the BBC television series of the same name and for voicing Captain Scarlet in Captain Scarlet and the Mysterons.

== Early life ==
Matthews was born in York on 2 September 1927, to Henry and Kathleen Matthews. His father was a shop steward at the Rowntree's chocolate factory near York. His parents often took him to the theatre, where he gained a love of acting. He attended St George's RC Primary School, then St Michael's Jesuit College in Leeds.

He found work as a stagehand at the Theatre Royal in Leeds, and made his theatrical debut in 1945 in the play The Corn Is Green before performing his national service in the Royal Navy. After leaving the military he returned to the stage, appearing in a 1954 touring production of the play No Escape, which starred Flora Robson. He made his West End debut in 1956.

== Career ==
In the 1950s and 1960s, Matthews's film roles for Hammer Studios included the Baron's assistant in The Revenge of Frankenstein (1958) and the heroes of Dracula: Prince of Darkness and Rasputin the Mad Monk (both 1966). On television, from 1969 to 1971, he played Francis Durbridge's amateur private detective Paul Temple in the BBC series of the same name.

Matthews starred opposite Morecambe and Wise in the films The Intelligence Men (1965) and That Riviera Touch (1966), which led to a close friendship with Eric Morecambe. He also appeared throughout the 1960s and 1970s in a variety of television comedy roles, including Eric & Ernie's Christmas Show, 1977. He appeared alongside George Cole in Charles Woods' sitcom Don't Forget To Write! (1977) as a successful writer.

In 1967, Matthews provided the character voice of Captain Scarlet, in imitation of Cary Grant, for Gerry and Sylvia Anderson's Supermarionation television series Captain Scarlet and the Mysterons. (He divided his time, during the recording sessions, between his work there and his stage appearances in Noël Coward's play Private Lives.) Also in 1967 he appeared in The Avengers episode entitled "Mission ... Highly Improbable".

Publicity shot of Matthews

In the late 1970s, he served as narrator and host for Follow Me!, a BBC educational programme that offered a "crash course" in the English language to foreign viewers. In 1986, Matthews and his wife, Angela Browne, appeared together in the BBC adaptation of the Josephine Tey novel Brat Farrar. In 2000, they starred in two Ray Cooney plays on the cruise ship MS Marco Polo, while she was sailing to the Antarctic: Run For Your Wife and Funny Money.

== Personal life ==
Francis Matthews' younger brother, Paul Shelley, is also an actor; they had a sister, Maura..

Matthews was married to actress Angela Browne from 1963 until her death in 2001; the couple had three sons. Two, Damien Matthews and Paul Rattigan, are actors; the other, Dominic, is an artist and musician.

== Death ==
Matthews died at the age of 86 on 14 June 2014, following a short illness. He was survived by his three sons, seven grandchildren, and his two siblings.

== Filmography ==
Year	Title	Role	Notes
1951	At Your Service, Ltd.	Roger Buckett	
1955	Truant in Park Lane	Robert	
1956	My Friend Charles	Ken Palmer	
1956	Bhowani Junction	Ranjit Kasel	
1956	The Talking Cat	Lancelot	
1957	Esmé Divided	Esmé Vignoles	
1957	Small Hotel	Alan Pryor	
1957	The Mark of the Hawk	Overholt	
1958	The Killing Stones	Desai	
1958	The Revenge of Frankenstein	Doctor Hans Kleve	
1958	A Woman Possessed	John	
1958	I Only Arsked!	Mahmoud	
1958	Corridors of Blood	Jonathan Bolton	
1960	Sentenced for Life	Jim Richards	
1961	The Hellfire Club	Sir Hugh Manning	
1961	The Treasure of Monte Cristo	Louis Auclair	
1961	The Pursuers	David	
1962	The Battleaxe	Tony Evers	
1962	The Lamp in Assassin Mews	Jack	
1963	Nine Hours to Rama	Rampure	
1963	A Stitch in Time	Benson	
1964	The Beauty Jungle	Taylor	
1964	Murder Ahoy	Lieutenant Compton	
1965	The Intelligence Men	Thomas	
1966	Dracula: Prince of Darkness	Charles Kent	
1966	Rasputin the Mad Monk	Ivan	
1966	That Riviera Touch	Hotel Manager	
1967	Just Like a Woman	Lewis McKenzie	
1969	Crossplot	Ruddock	
1969	Taste of Excitement	Mr. Breese	
1974	Five Women for the Killer	Giorgio Pisani	
1999	Do Not Disturb	Manager	
2012	Run For Your Wife		

== Television ==
Year	Title	Role	Notes
1954-1957	BBC Sunday-Night Theatre	Ken Wilson/Ensign Trefusis	2 episodes
1955	St. Ives	Ronald Gilchrist	4 episodes
1956	My Friend Charles	Ken Palmer	Drama series written by Francis Durbridge, appearing in 5 episodes
1956-1963	ITV Television Playhouse	Various	5 episodes
1957	The New Adventures of Charlie Chan	Derek Robinson	Episode: "The Death of a Don"
1957	O.S.S.	Peter Fox	Episode: "Operation Powder Puff"
1957-1958	The Adventures of Robin Hood	Roland/Ali ben Azra	2 episodes
1959	Theatre Night	Guy Stevens	Episode: "How Say You?"
1960	Interpol Calling	Fawley	Episode: "White Blackmail"
1960	Man from Interpol	Richard Martin/Maharajah of Den	2 episodes
1960	The World of Tim Frazer	Lewis Richards	7 episodes
1960	Biggles	Captain Haziri	3 episodes
1961	The Cheaters	Jack Fisher	Episode: "The Legacy"
1961	Triton	Lieutenant Lamb	Miniseries
1961-1967	ITV Play of the Week	Various	3 episodes
1962	The Dark Island	Grant	Missing BBC2 drama series but was made into a radio series in 1969
1963	Hancock	Elmo Dent	Episode: "The Writer"
1963-1966	Comedy Playhouse	Captain Hawkins/Mr. Dillington	2 episodes
1964-1965	A Little Big Business	Simon Lieberman	5 episodes
1964-1967	The Saint	Paul Farley/Andre	2 episodes
1964	Dixon of Dock Green	Phillip Langton	Episode: "Fish on the Hook"
1965	Z-Cars	Rev. Corbett	Episode: "Brotherly Love"
1966-1967	The Avengers	Jerry Collns/Dr. Matthew Andrew Chivers	2 episodes
1967	Further Adventures of Lucky Jim		Sequal to Lucky Jim
1967	ITV Playhouse	Peter Morgan	Episode: "The Confession"
1967-1968	Captain Scarlet and the Mysterons	Captain Scarlet	
1969-1970	ITV Saturday Night Theatre	Doctor St. Andre/Maxwell Burden	2 episodes
1969-1971	Paul Temple	Paul Temple	
1975	Trinity Tales	Eric the Prologue	6 episodes
1983	Crown Court	Edward Sandys QC	Serial: "Seconds Away"
1984	Tears Before Bedtime	Geoffrey Dickens	7 episodes in a sitcom written by Richard Waring
1986	Screen Two	Silver-Haired Gent	Episode: "The McGuffin"
1993	Taggart	Dr. Gerald Napier	Episode: "Fatal Inheritance"
1995	The Detectives	Duke of Connemara	Episode: "Flash"
1998	Jonathan Creek	Jerry Bellinitus	Episode: "Black Canary"
1999-2000	Brookside	Lord Robin Cuddington	4 episodes
2002-2003	Heartbeat	Dr. James Alway	4 episodes
2003	The Royal	Dr. James Alway	2 episodes
2005	All About George	Ted	4 episodes
2009	Beautiful People	Mr. Bunions	Episode: "How I Got My Groom"

== Theatre ==
- Help Stamp Out Marriage! (1966) – Stuart Wheeler
- Middle Age Spread (1980-1981) - Reg

== Radio ==
- Radio version of the mostly erased tv series Not in Front of the Children - Henry Corner (BBC Radio 2, 1968-1969)
- Saturday-Night Theatre: Bonecrack by Dick Francis - Neil Griffon (BBC Radio 4FM, 1976)
- Cast, In Order of Disappearance – Charles Paris (BBC Radio 2, June 1984)
- So Much Blood – Charles Paris (BBC Radio 2, August 1985)
- The Case of the Cool Canary - Dick George (BBC Radio 4, 1986)
- More Work for the Undertaker - Albert Campion (BBC Radio 4, 1986)
- The Case of the Substitute Spouse - Dick George (BBC Radio 4, 1989)
- The Case of the Vanishing Vamp - Dick (BBC Radio 4, 1992)
- Murder at the Vicarage - Rev Leonard Clement (BBC Radio 4, 1993)
