= Word of Honour (Upstairs, Downstairs) =

- Upstairs, Downstairs episode
- Episode no.: Season 3 Episode 7
- Directed by: Lionel Harris
- Written by: Fay Weldon
- Original air date: 8 December 1973

Episode chronology
← Previous "Desirous of Change"	Next → "The Bolter"

"Word of Honour" is the seventh episode of the third series of the British television series, Upstairs, Downstairs. The episode is set in 1913.

== Plot ==
Jack Challen gives Richard Bellamy an insider's investment tip, by telling him that the shares of Cartwright Engineering will soon rise. In return, Richard gives his word of honour and promises not to disclose his source. Henry Pritchett is a Parliamentary opponent and thinks that Richard Bellamy was using inside information from his days at the Admiralty. After that, the Government initiates an inquiry. But Hazel reveals Richard's source.

== Cast ==
- Jack Challen (John Horsley)
- Bunting (Edward Palmer)
- Arthur Naws (Kenneth Watson)
- Henry Pritchett MP (Peter Cellier)
- Johnson Munby MP (Anthony Sharp)
- Sir William Trevanion KC MP (Geoffrey Lumsden)
- Sir Percy Devenish MP (Alastair Hunter)
- Reuben Chantry MP (John Gabriel)
