= Angela Browne =

British actress (1938–2001)

- Angela Browne playing Contesse Lili de Ternay in Desirous of Change (1973)
- Born: 14 June 1938; Walton-on-Thames, Surrey, England
- Died: 20 June 2001 (aged 63); Esher, Surrey, England
- Education: Royal Academy of Dramatic Art
- Occupation: Actress
- Years active: 1958–1989
- Spouse: Francis Matthews (m. 1963)
- Children: 3

Angela Browne (14 June 1938 – 20 June 2001) was a British actress. She had a recurring role in the early 1960s crime series Ghost Squad. She also appeared in episodes of shows such as Danger Man, No Hiding Place, The Saint, The Avengers, The Prisoner, Upstairs, Downstairs and Minder. In 1966 she appeared in the Norman Wisdom comedy film Press for Time.

== Personal life ==
She was married to actor Francis Matthews from 1963 until her death; they had three sons together. They appeared in the 1962 TV miniseries The Dark Island and the 1967 film Just Like a Woman, and also co-starred in a 1970 episode of his show Paul Temple. Browne gave up acting in 1990.

== Death ==
Browne died on 20 June 2001 at the age of 63. She was survived by her husband, actor Francis Matthews and their three sons, Damien, Paul and Dominic. Matthews died thirteen years later on 14 June 2014 at the age of 86.

== Selected filmography ==
=== Film ===
- Carry On Nurse (1959) – Young Nurse (uncredited)
- Doctor in Love (1960) – Susan, Occupational Therapist (uncredited)
- A Story of David (1961) – Michal
- Press for Time (1966) – Eleanor Lampton
- Just Like a Woman (1967) – Scilla's Friend

=== Television ===
- Scotland Yard (The Ghost Train Murder) (1959) – Sergeant Brown
- Danger Man (TV Series) (The Girl in Pink Pajamas) (1960) The Girl
- Ghost Squad (1961–63) – Helen Winters
- The Dark Island (1962) - Mary Somers
- Out of This World (Impostor) (1962) - Jean Baron
- No Hiding Place (Last Flight) (1963) - Fiona Sharpe
- The Saint (The Elusive Ellshaw) (1963) – Anne Ripwell
- Court Martial (1965–66) – Sergeant Yolanda Perkins
- The Avengers (How to Succeed .... At Murder) (1966) – Sara / Miss Penny
- The Prisoner - A Change of Mind (1967) – Number Eighty-Six
- Man in a Suitcase - Man From the Dead (1967) – Rachel Thyssen
- The Tenant of Wildfell Hall (1968) - Lady Annabella Lowborough
- Paul Temple (Games People Play) (1970) – Juliet
- Upstairs, Downstairs - Desirous of Change (1973) - Comtesse Lili de Ternay
- Kizzy (1976) – Mrs. Cuthbert
- Breakaway (1980) - Margaret Randell
- Minder (Caught in the Act, Fact) (1980) – Lady Margaret Thompson
- Butterflies (1983) - Amanda
- The Adventures of Sherlock Holmes (The Copper Beeches) (1984) - Mrs Toller
- Brat Farrar (1986) - Beatrice Ashby
- Chelworth (1989) - Barbara Chivers

== Bibliography ==
- Tise Vahimagi & Michael Grade. British television: an illustrated guide. Oxford University Press, 1996.
