= Cross Green, Leeds =

Area in Leeds, West Yorkshire, England

Coordinates: 53.789°N 1.511°W

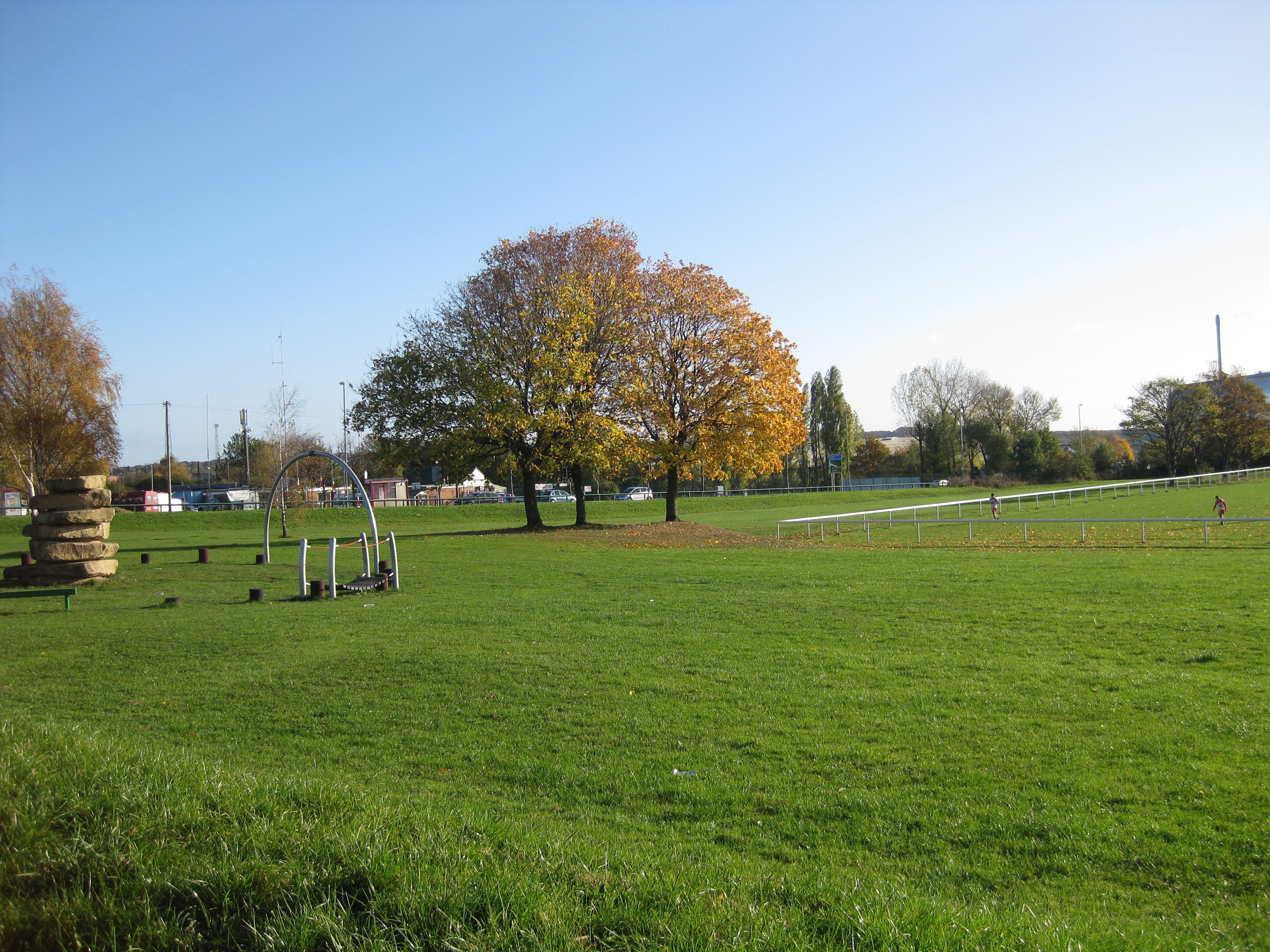
Cross Green playing fields

Cross Green is a mainly industrial area of Leeds, West Yorkshire, England. It is around 1 mile (1.6 km) on a hill to the south east of Leeds city centre, with the A63 road (Pontefract Lane) running through the middle and dividing it into a residential estate with playing fields and housing to the north, and a large industrial estate to the south. The area lies in the LS9 Leeds postcode area between Osmondthorpe, Richmond Hill and Hunslet.

== Leeds RERF ==
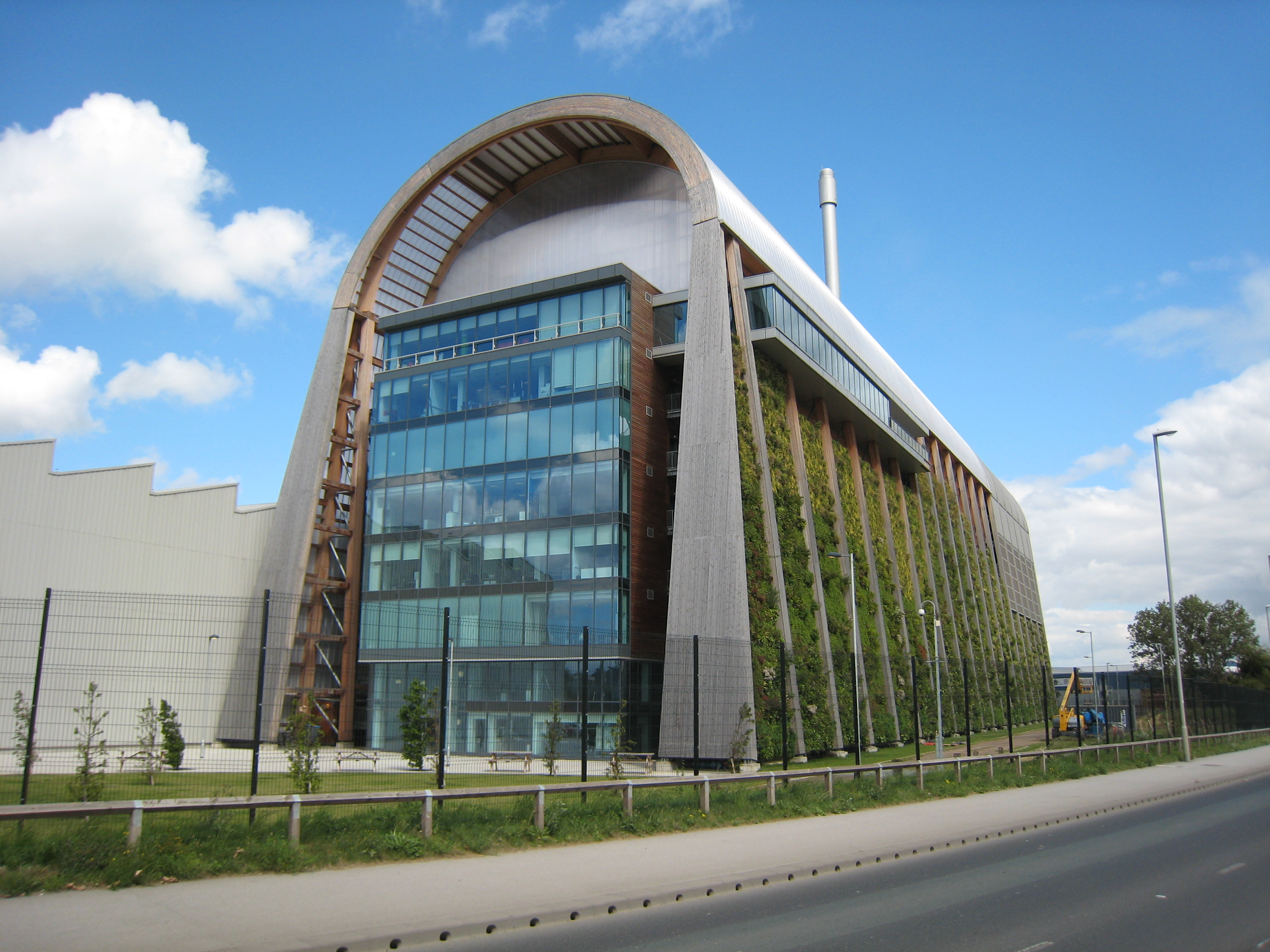
Leeds RERF from Pontefract Lane

An area north of Pontefract Lane formerly housed the main Leeds wholesale markets, one for meat, one for fish, fruit and vegetables. This was redeveloped into a facility for converting household waste into energy which opened in April 2016, and handles all the black bag bin waste from Leeds. This is called the Leeds Recycling and Energy Recovery Facility (RERF), and is operated by Veolia. The main building itself is distinctive in appearance, because of its arched timber beam construction and a Green wall on the South side, and won the Project of the Year award at the Structural Timber Awards 2015.

== Residential Area ==
This consists of 450 homes, largely traditional terraced and back-to-back houses on Cross Green Lane and streets north of it. It is home to Leeds GATE (Gypsy And Traveller Exchange). A school, Cross Green Comprehensive School, became Copperfields College, but has now been demolished.

The Anglican Church of St Hilda and its vicarage are both Grade II Listed Buildings. It is a red brick church by J. T. Micklethwaite, dating from 1881.

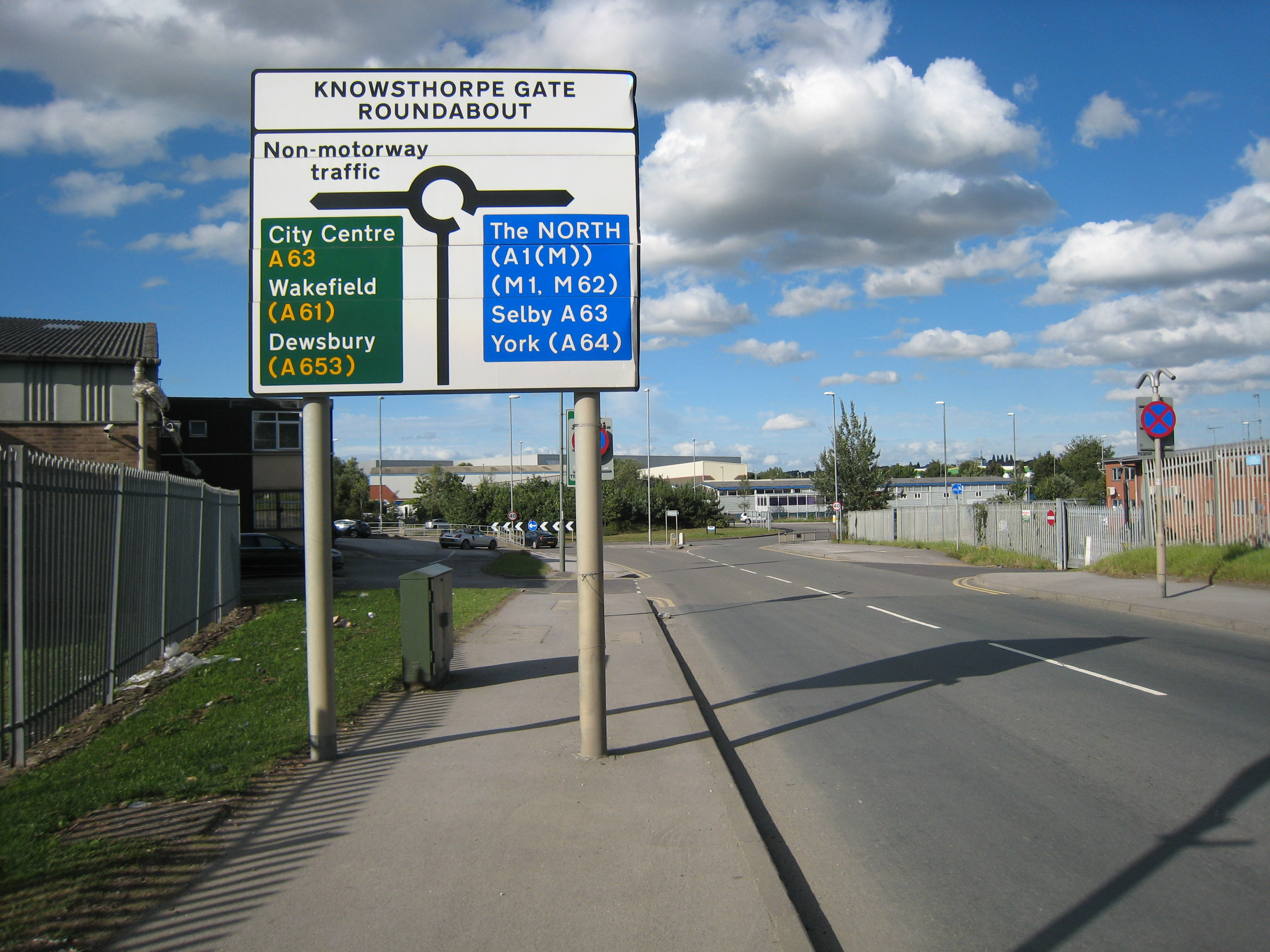
Road from the industrial estate to the A63 roundabout

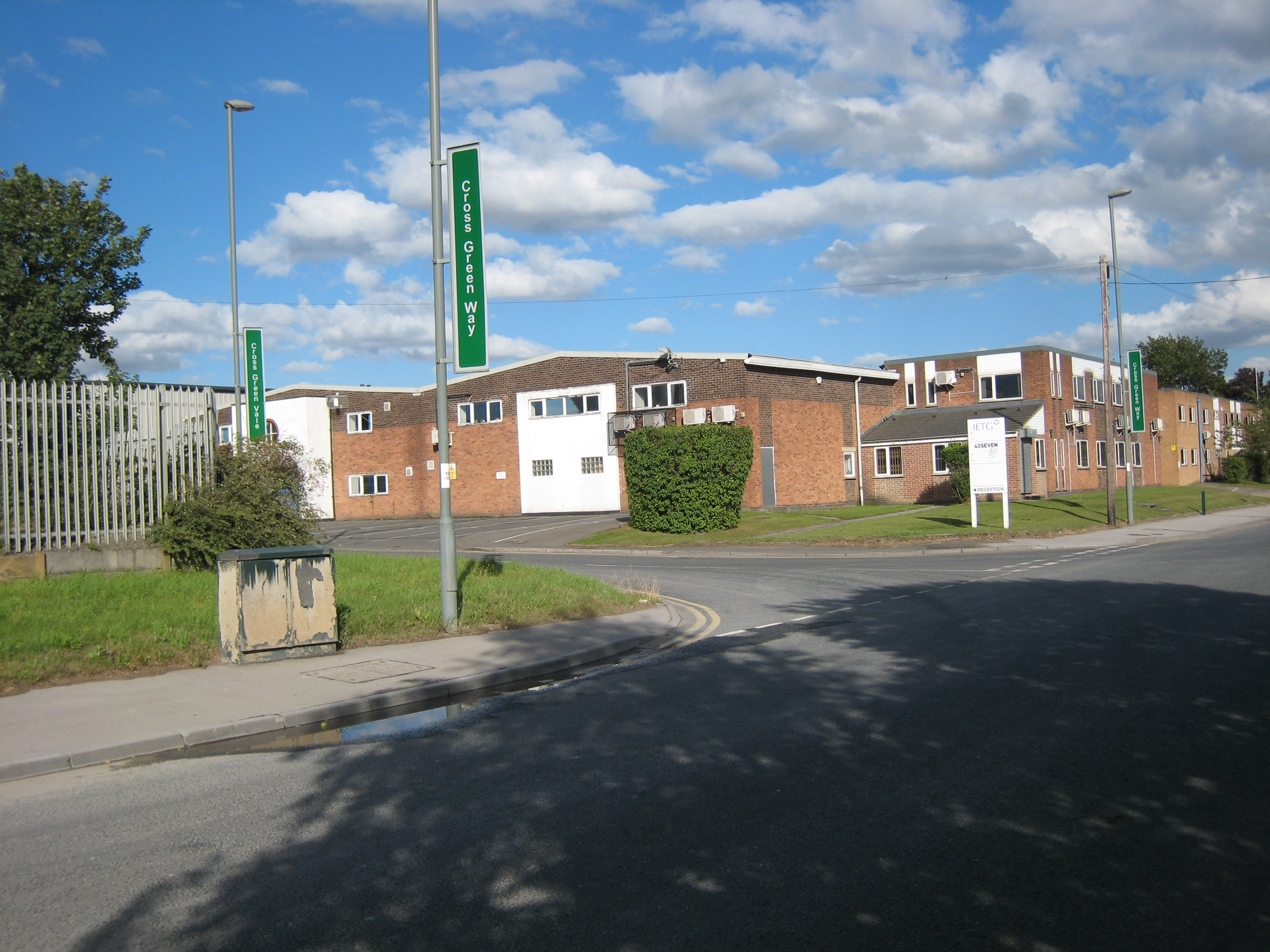
Road on Cross Green Industrial Estate

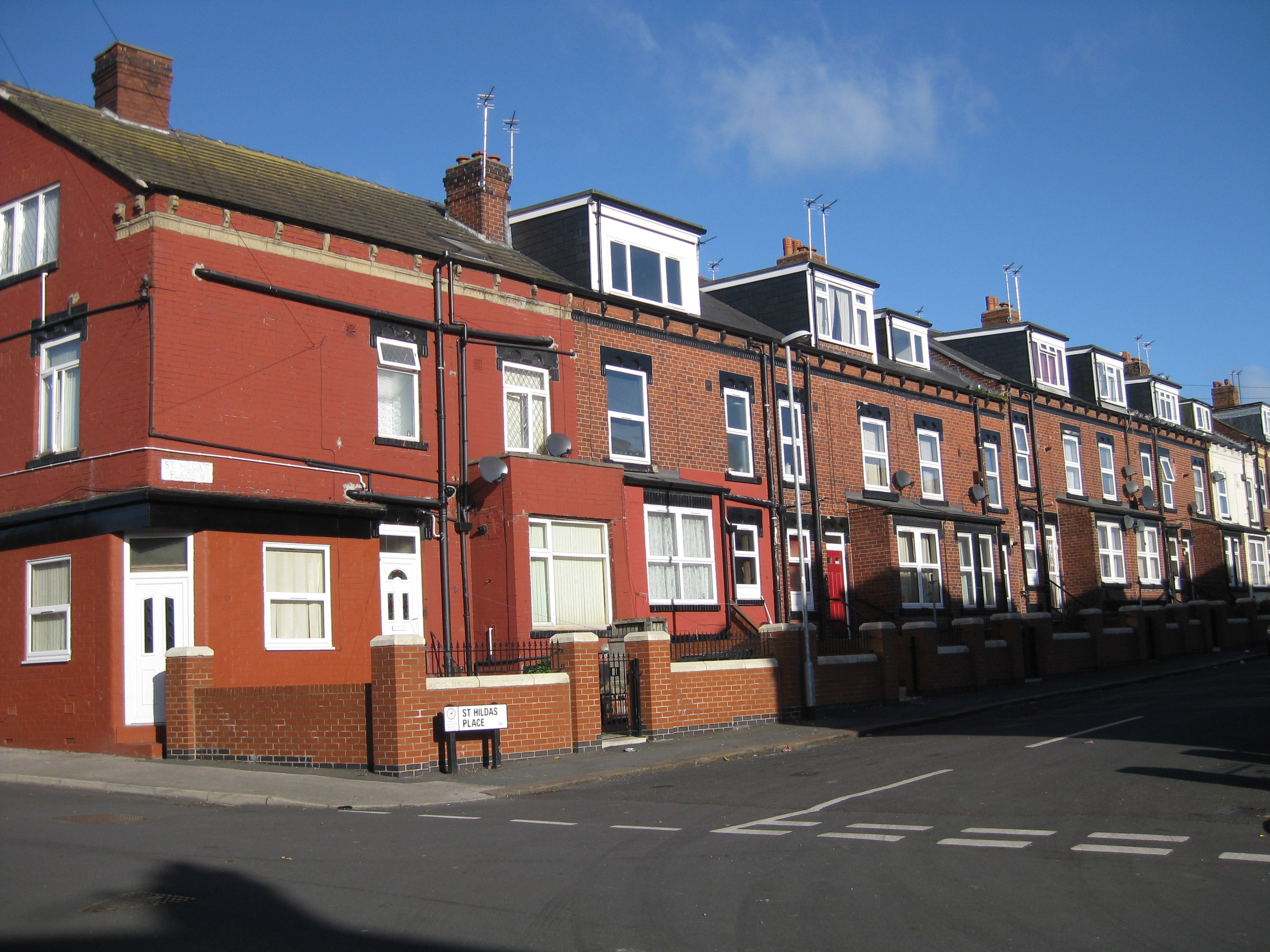
Terraced housing

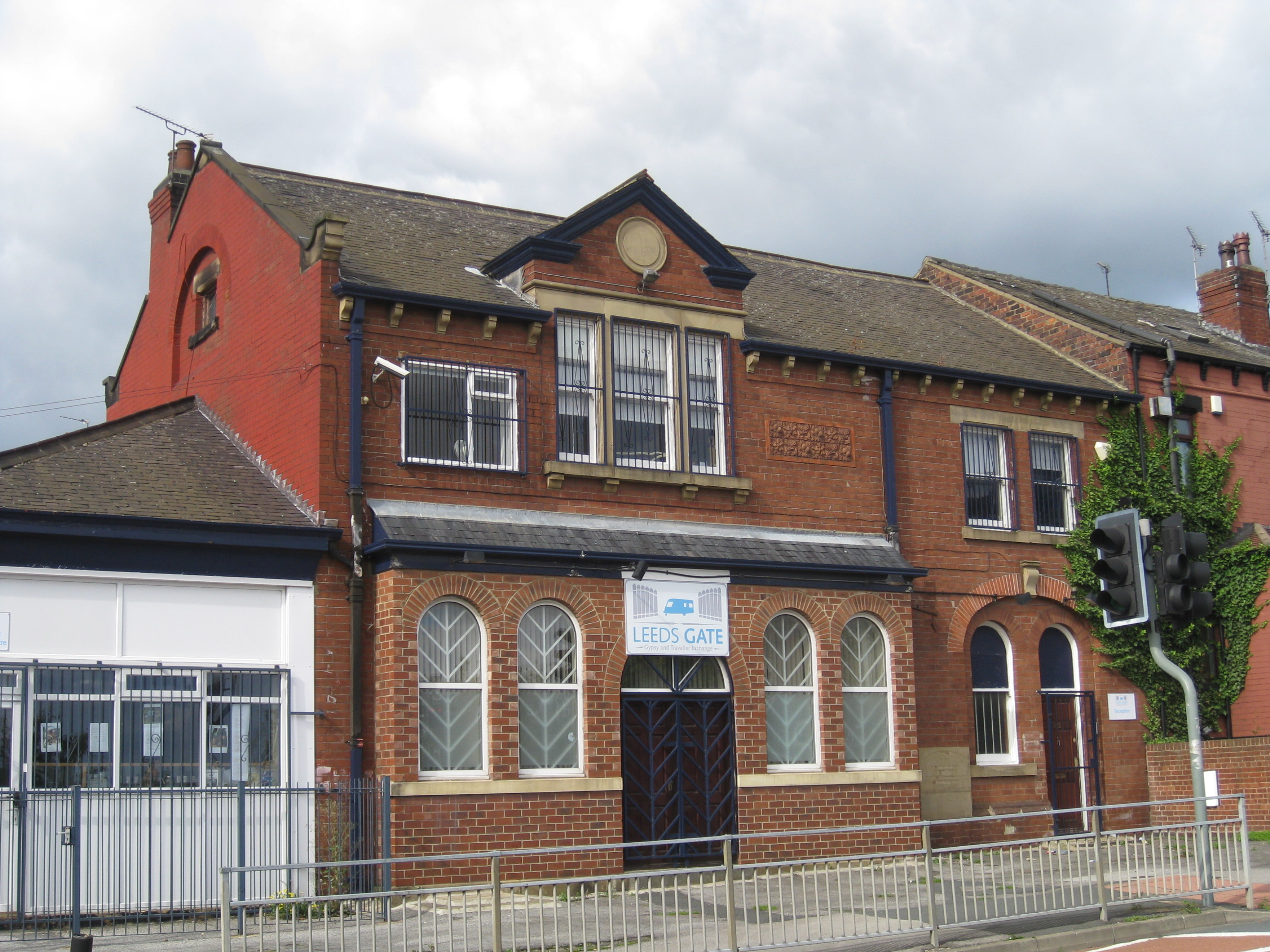
Leeds GATE

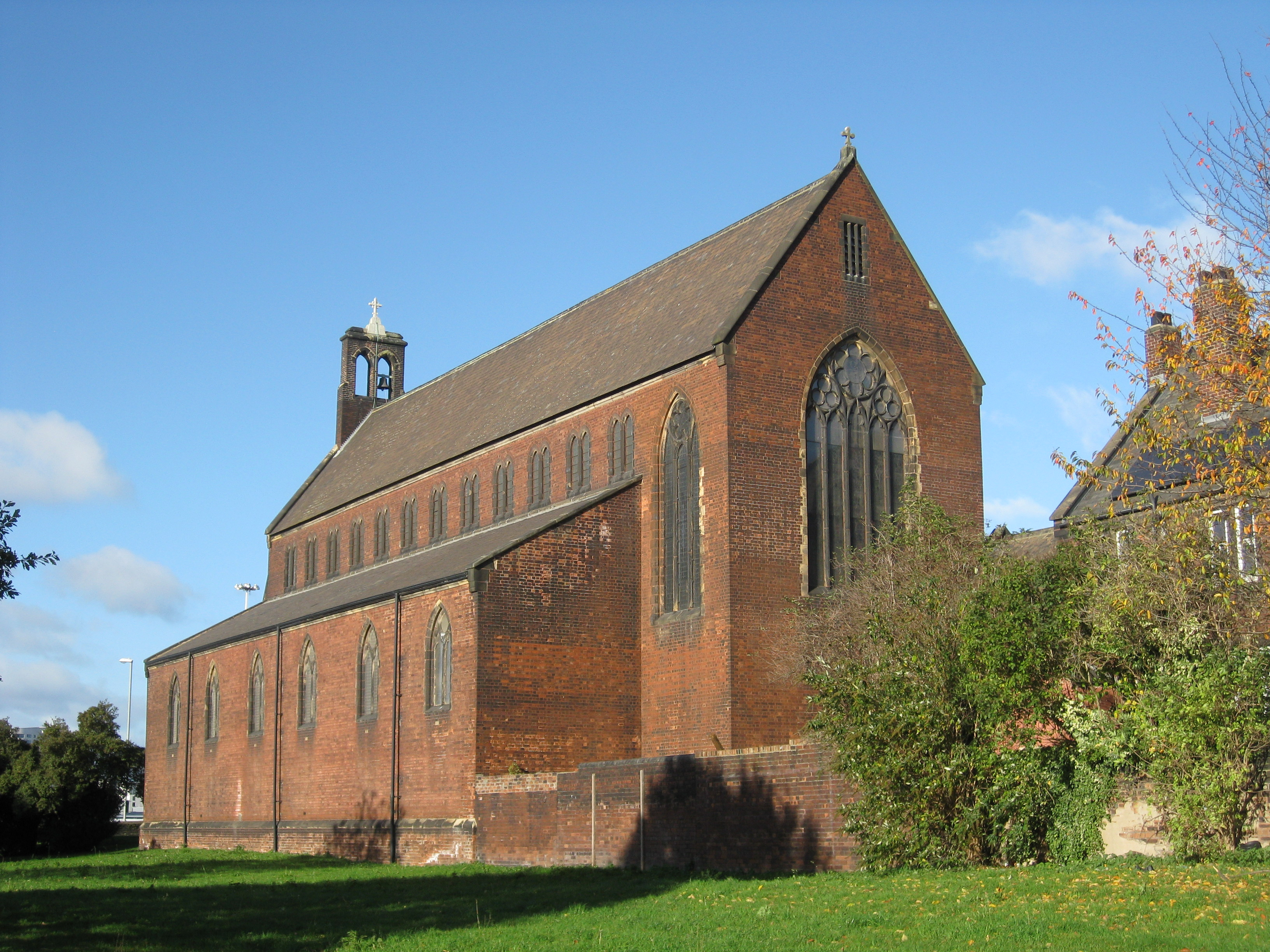
St Hilda exterior

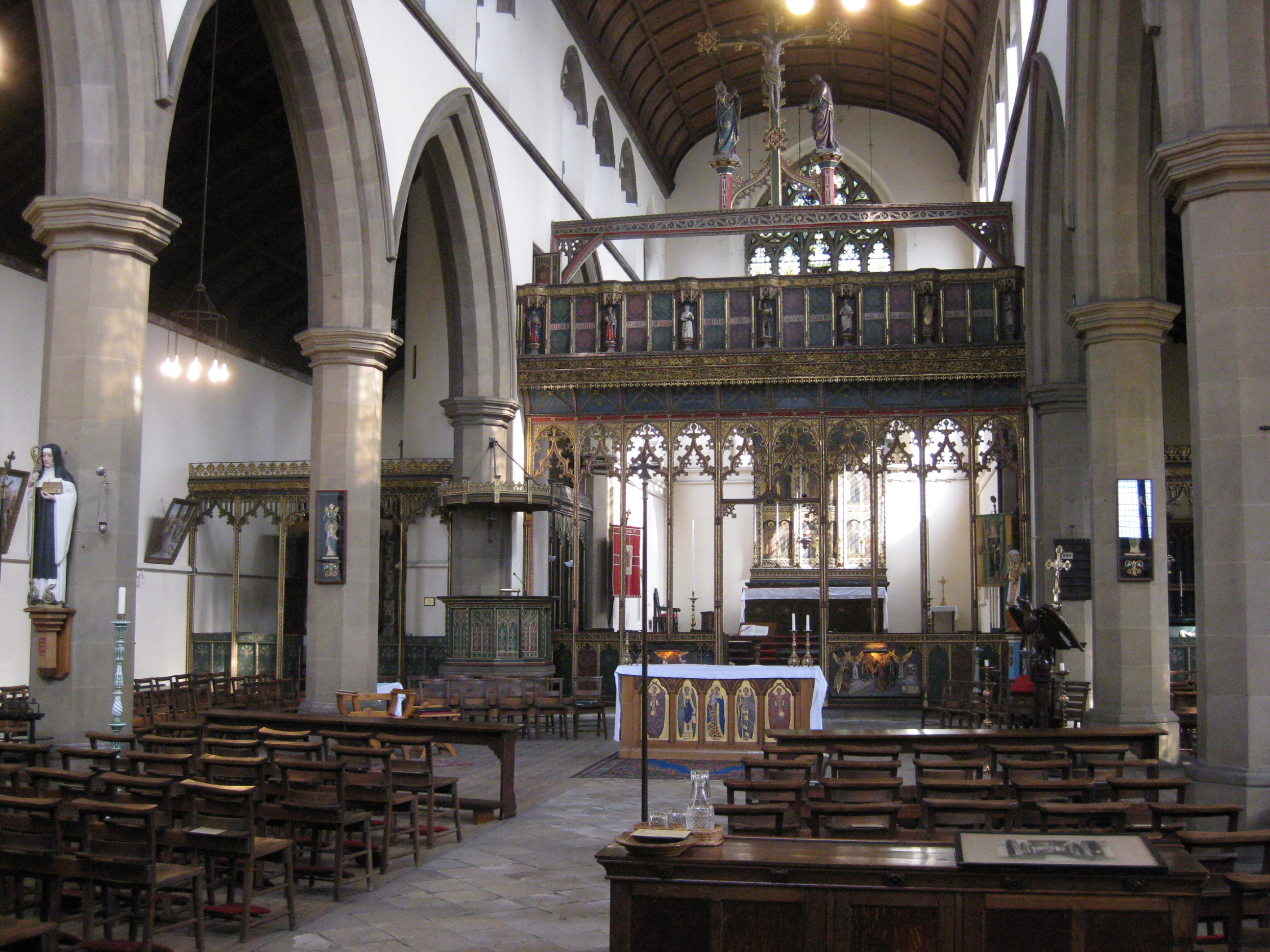
St Hilda interior

== Notable people ==
It was the birthplace in 1942 of the poet Barry Tebb.

== See also ==
- Listed buildings in Leeds (Burmantofts and Richmond Hill Ward)
