= Richmond Hill, Leeds =

District of Leeds, England

Coordinates: 53.7943°N 1.5256°W

Richmond Hill
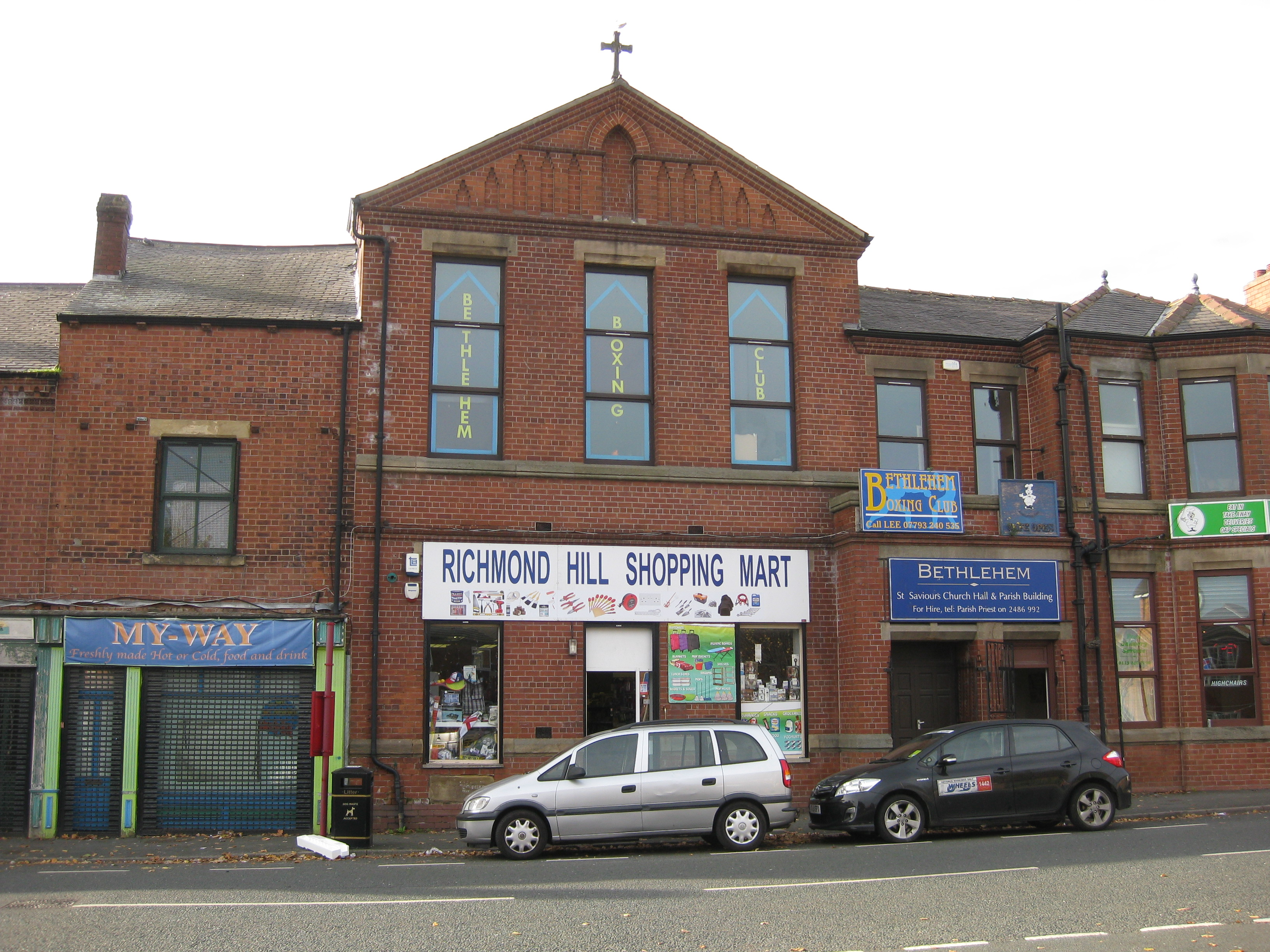
- Shopping Mart and Church Hall, Upper Accommodation Road

- Location within West Yorkshire
- OS grid reference: SE316334
- Metropolitan borough: City of Leeds
- Metropolitan county: West Yorkshire
- Region: Yorkshire and the Humber
- Country: England
- Sovereign state: United Kingdom
- Post town: LEEDS
- Postcode district: LS9
- Dialling code: 0113
- Police: West Yorkshire
- Fire: West Yorkshire
- Ambulance: Yorkshire
- UK Parliament: Leeds South

Richmond Hill is a district of Leeds, West Yorkshire, England. The district lies a mile to the east of the city centre between York Road (A64 road), East End Park and Cross Green. The appropriate City of Leeds ward is Burmantofts and Richmond Hill.

== History ==
Richmond Hill developed as a residential and industrial area during the late-18th and 19th centuries. The housing in the area was originally small cottages, but during the Industrial Revolution many streets of back-to-back terrace houses were built to house the influx of workers. Upper Accommodation Road is the historic heart of the area with some of the more historic buildings on the west side and newer ones on the east. A Leeds Industrial Co-operative building from 1902 is on a corner with East Park Road. In the 20th century much of the housing stock was updated with schemes such as the Saxton Gardens. The Saxton Gardens estate has since been redeveloped by Urban Splash to create 410 homes, allotments and the largest communal garden in the city.

Four churches were built in the area. On top of the hill is the Anglican Parish Church of St Saviour, a Grade I listed building built in 1845, founded by Edward Bouverie Pusey. Nearby is the redundant Roman Catholic Mount St Mary's Church (opened 1857, closed 1989). It was built to serve the Irish community which had come to live in the area (then slum housing and industry known as The Bank) by the 1850s, and was considered to be the largest parish church in Europe. Mount St Mary's Catholic High School originates from a convent school to serve the same community. On York Road, All Saints Church, (now closed) was built in 1980 to replace an earlier and larger church of the same name. Newbourne Methodist Church, designed by the architects Charlton and Crowther, Leeds, opened in 1971 and is located on Upper Accommodation Road. The church occupies part of the site of the former Bourne Primitive Methodist Chapel, which was opened in 1878.

The former Leeds (Richmond Hill) Circuit of the Methodist Church later became part of the Leeds East Circuit, which merged with Leeds North-East Circuit in September 2013. The circuit's records are now held by the West Yorkshire Archive Service.

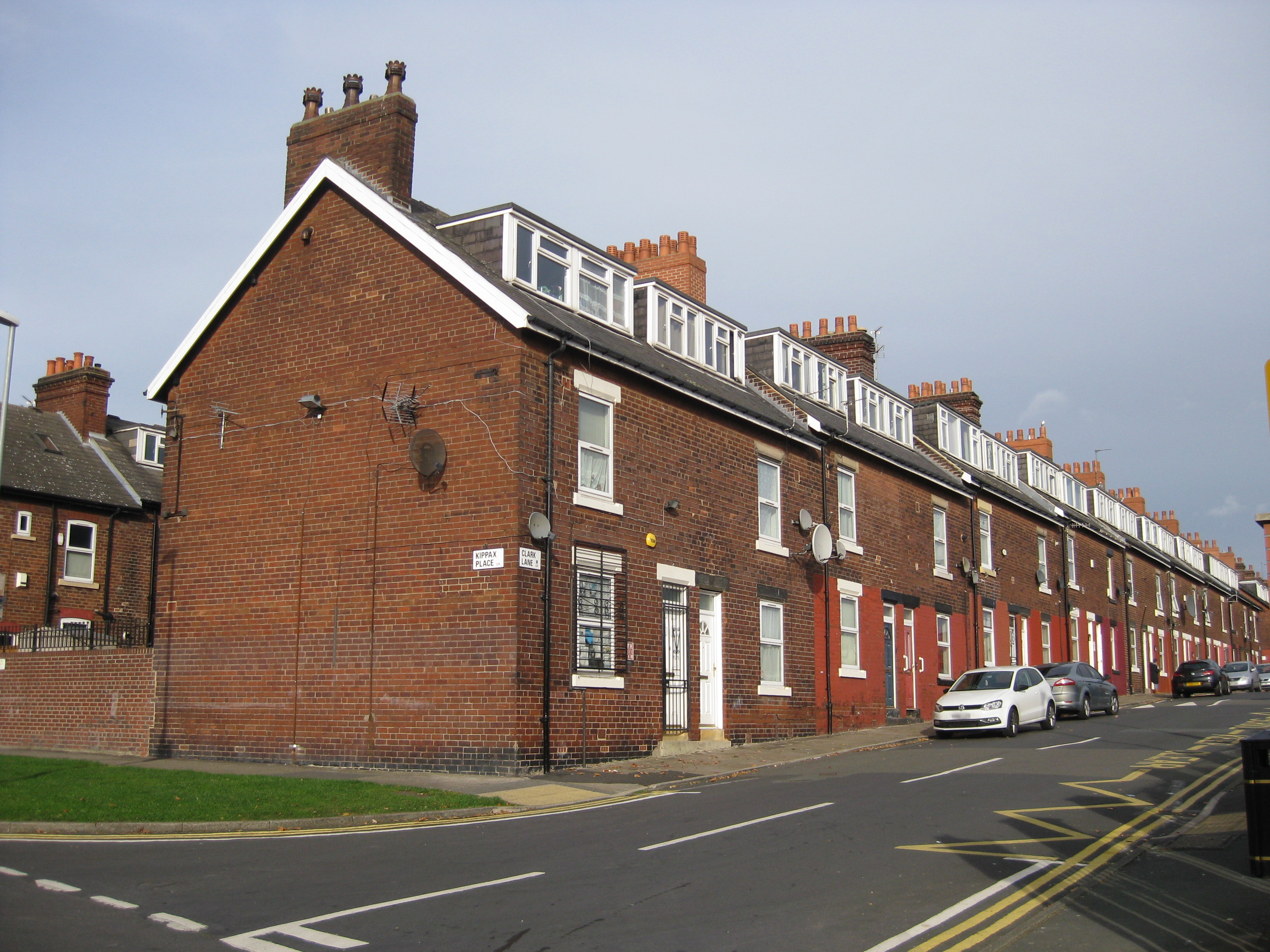
Traditional terraces

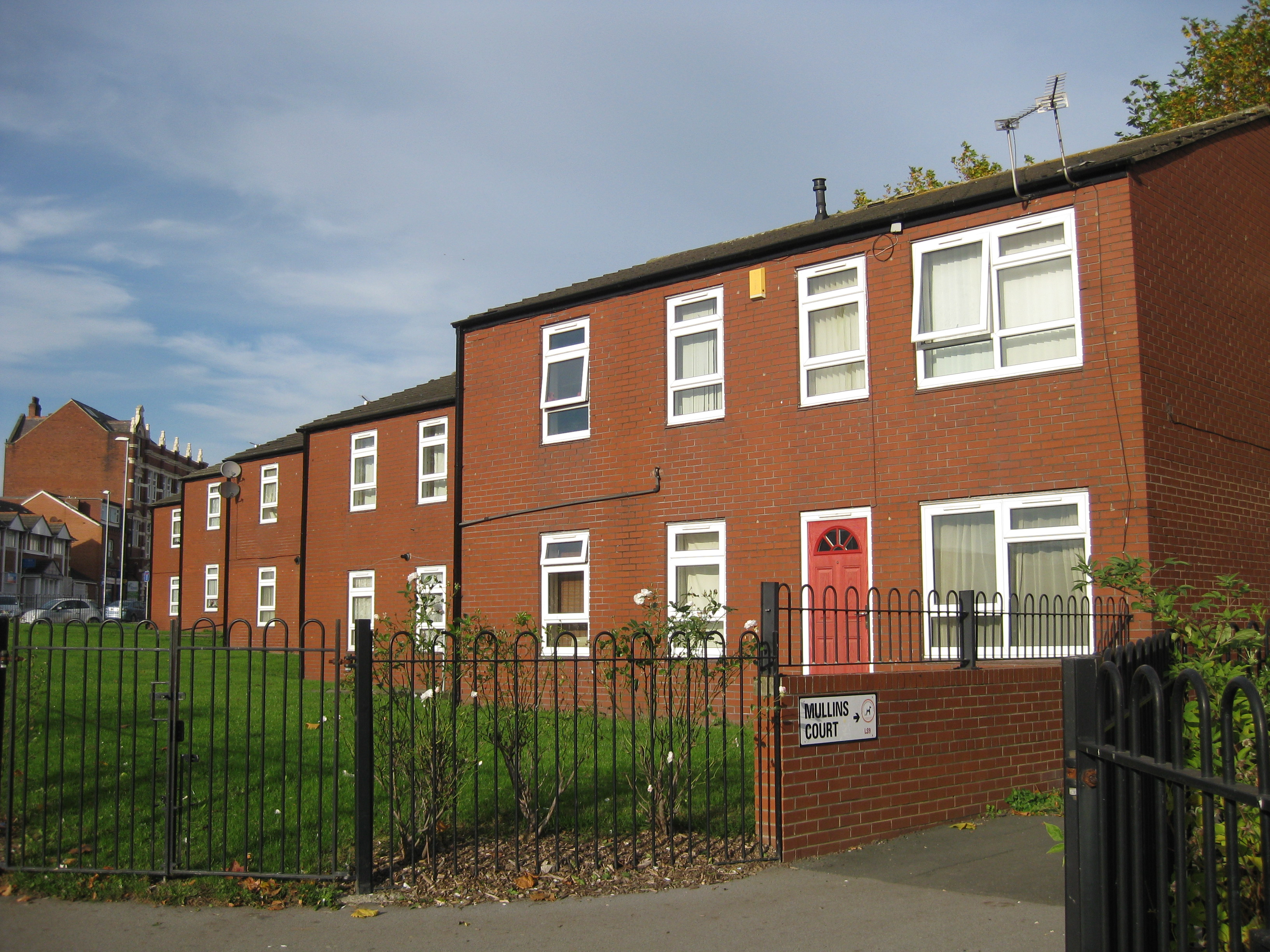
Newer houses

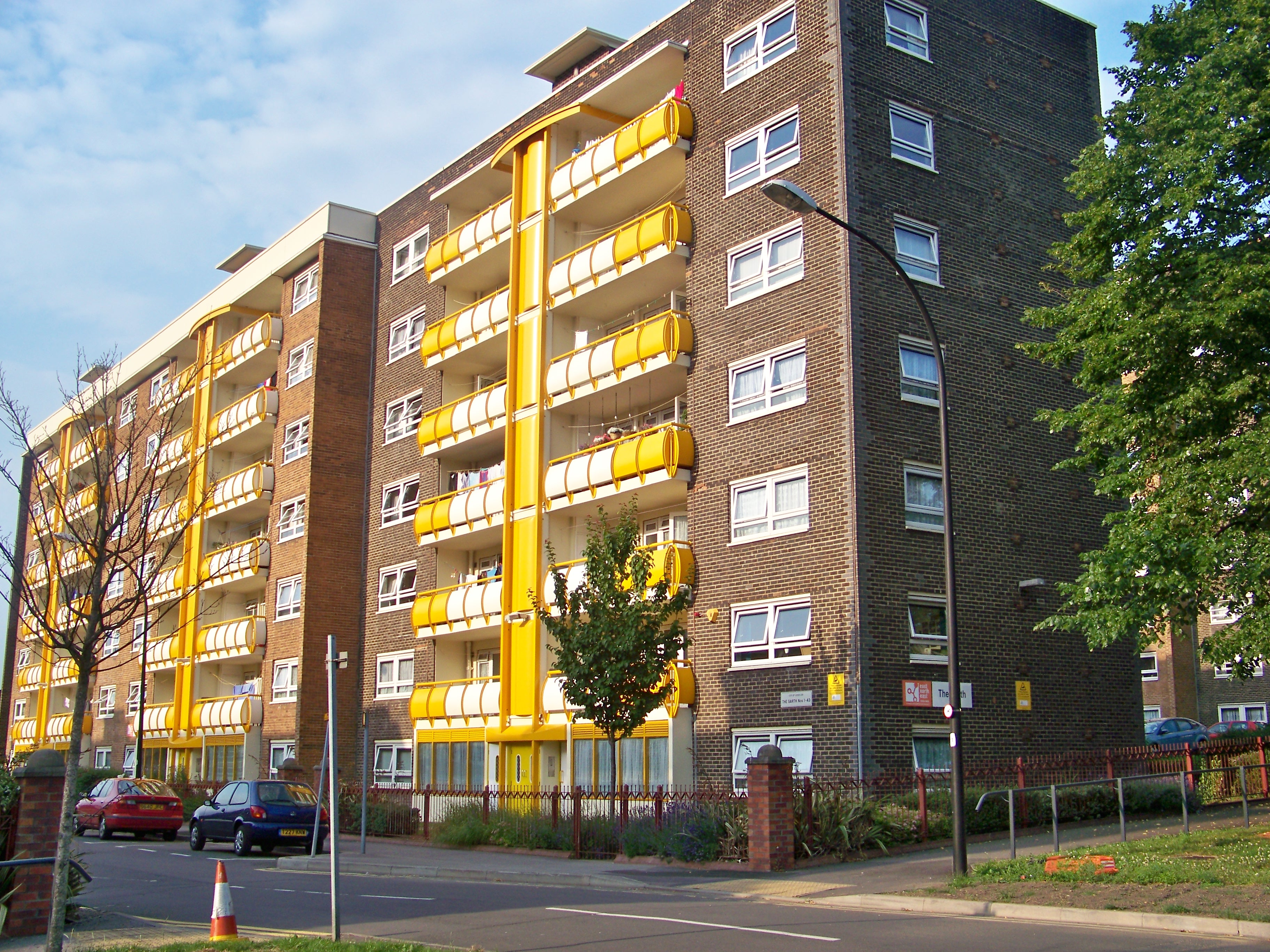
Flats on Saxton Gardens

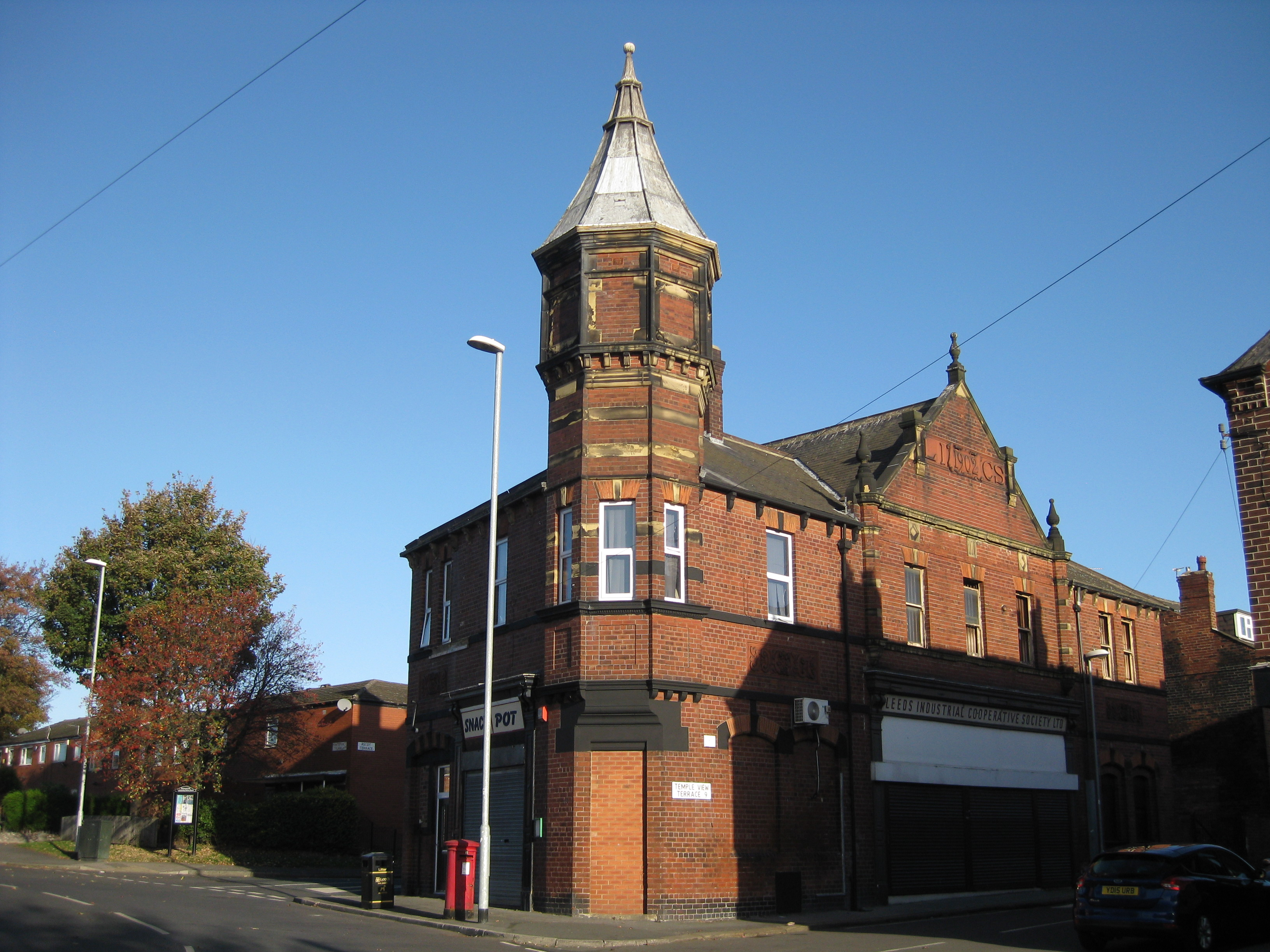
Leeds Industrial Co-op building

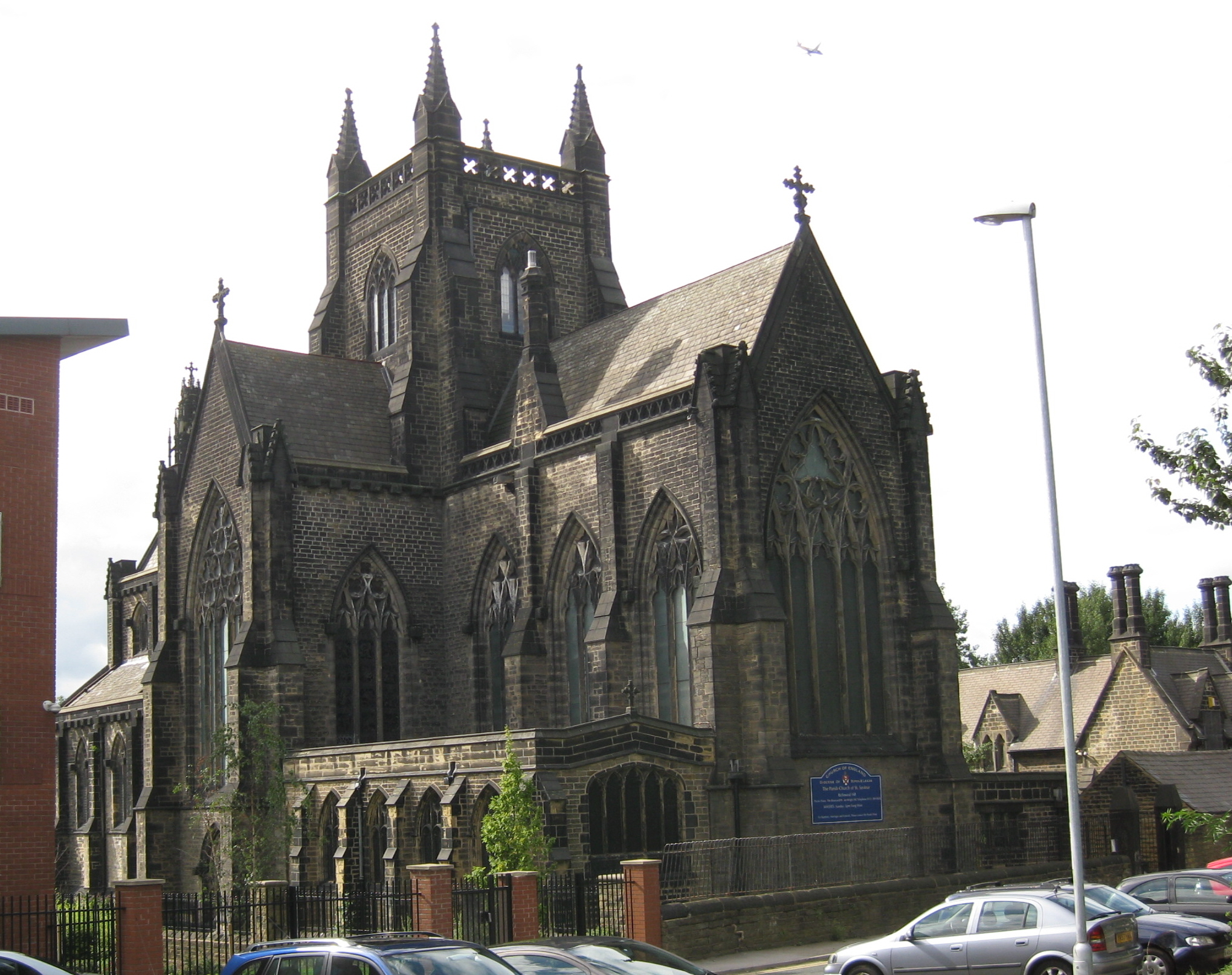
St Saviour Church

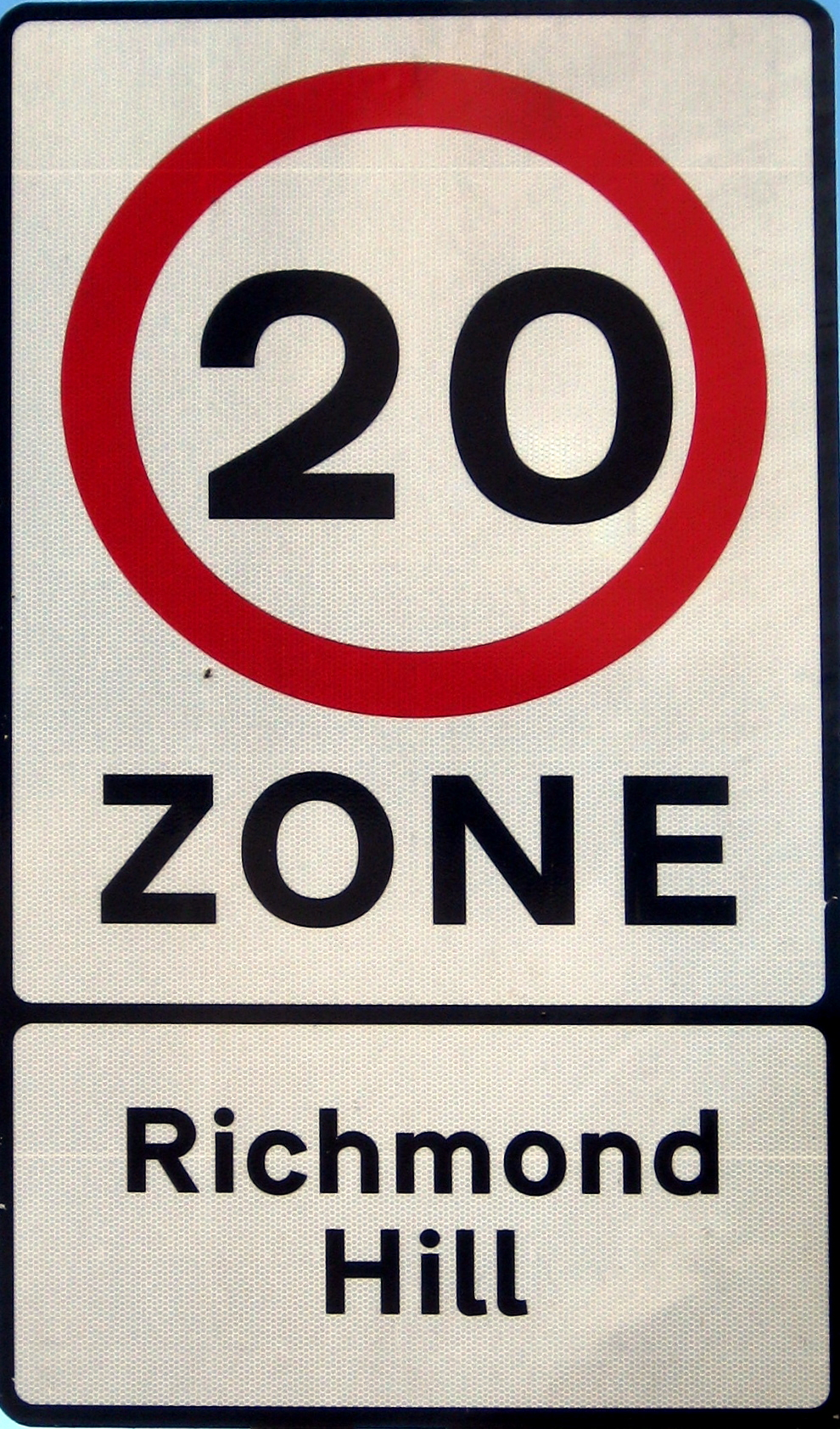
Speed limit sign

== Amenities ==
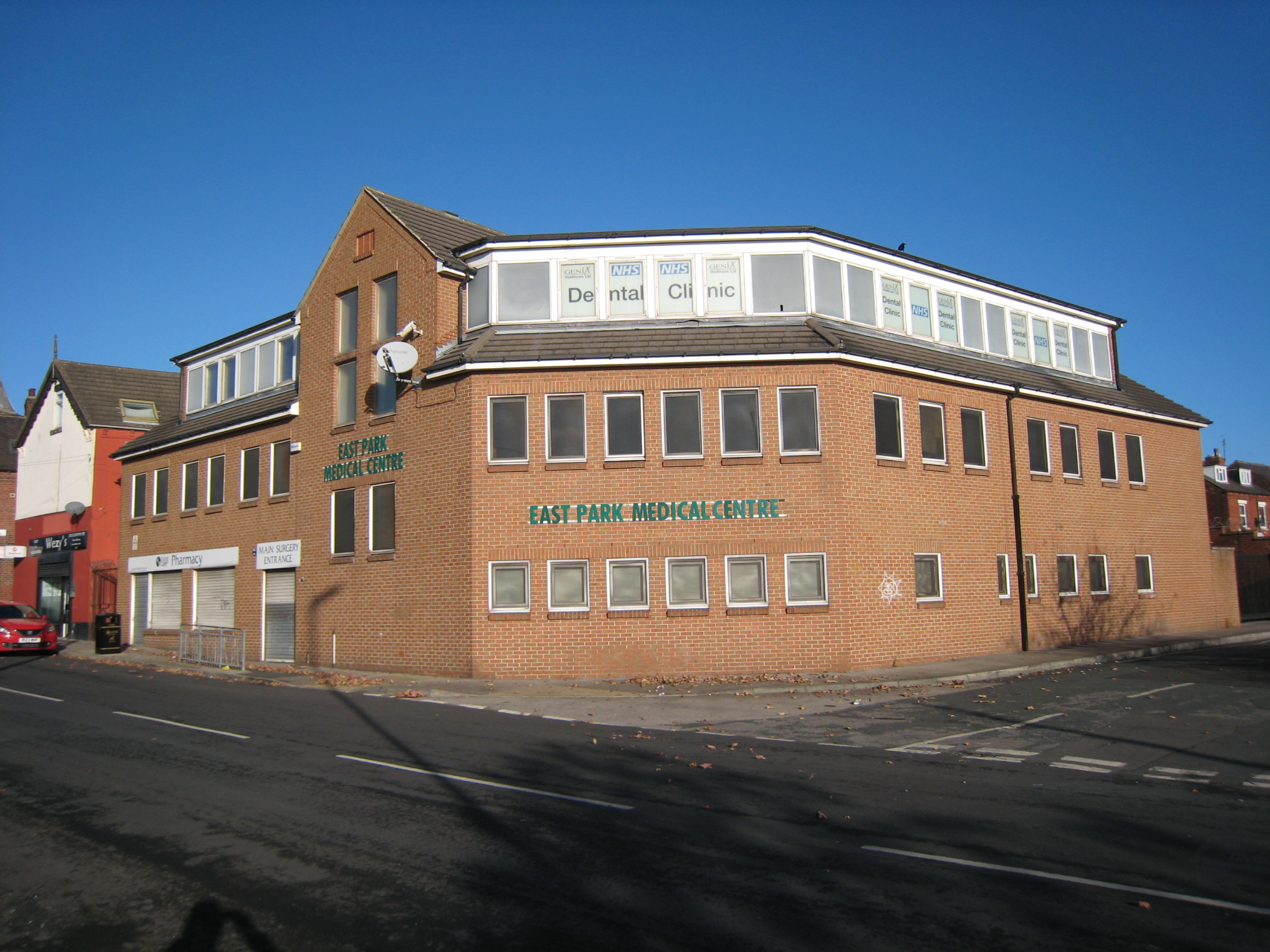
East Park Medical Centre

Richmond Hill has limited amenities. The Electrical Engineering department of the former Leeds College of Technology was at one time based on East Street. There are local shops including off licences, newsagents and fast food takeaways. There is a medical centre and dental practice on East Park Road.

== Transport ==
Richmond Hill lies close to the Leeds Inner Ring Road, and major routes in and out of the city which provides the area with many bus services. Most bus services are operated by First Leeds. The route 4 bus runs to the city centre, Seacroft, Gipton, Harehills, St James' Hospital, Wortley, Bramley and Pudsey. The 19 runs to Garforth, Colton, Halton the city centre, Headingley, West Park, Ireland Wood and Tinshill. The 40 runs to Whinmoor, Swarcliffe, Cross Gates, Halton and the city centre. The 49 runs to Seacroft, Gipton, Harehills, the city centre, Burley, Kirkstall and Bramley. The 50 runs to Seacroft, Oakwood, Harehills, Burley, Kirkstall, Hawksworth and Horsforth. The 56 runs to Whinmoor, Seacroft, Killingbeck, Hyde Park, the University of Leeds, Headingley and Moor Grange. The closest railway station is Leeds railway station, approximately one mile to the west. The railway line runs eastward through the district.

== See also ==
- Listed buildings in Leeds (Burmantofts and Richmond Hill Ward)
