= Listed buildings in Leeds (Burmantofts and Richmond Hill Ward) =

Burmantofts and Richmond Hill is a ward in the metropolitan borough of the City of Leeds, West Yorkshire, England. It contains 15 listed buildings that are recorded in the National Heritage List for England. Of these, one is listed at Grade I, the highest of the three grades, one is at Grade II*, the middle grade, and the others are at Grade II, the lowest grade. The ward includes the areas of Burmantofts, Cross Green, and Richmond Hill. The listed buildings consist of five churches and associated structures, a former school and an active school, a former mill, a former library and public baths, and two monuments in Beckett Street Cemetery.

== Key ==
Grade	Criteria
I	Buildings of exceptional interest, sometimes considered to be internationally important
II*	Particularly important buildings of more than special interest
II	Buildings of national importance and special interest

== Buildings ==
Name and location	Photograph	Date	Notes	Grade
East Street Mills; 53.79323°N 1.52923°W	—	c. 1825	A former flax mill converted for residential use, it is in red brick with roofs of slate and tile. The building has an L-shaped plan and further added ranges. The main ranges have four storeys and the others have two, and behind the main ranges is the principal chimney in brick.	II
Boyds Mill; 53.79131°N 1.52732°W		1839–40	Originally a school designed by R. D. Chantrell, it is in stone with sill bands, and a slate roof with coped gables. There are two storeys and a symmetrical front of eleven bays, with domed turrets at the corners and flanking the central gabled bay. In the central bay is a doorway with a four-centred arch, over which is a recessed panel, a three-light stepped window, and a circular panel in the gable. The windows in the ground floor are mullioned and transomed with a continuous stepped hood mould, and in the upper floor are square windows.	II
St Saviour's Church, Richmond Hill; 53.79197°N 1.52659°W		1842–45	The church was built and paid for by E. B. Pusey, a leader of the Oxford Movement. It is in stone, and in Gothic Revival style. The church consists of a nave with a clerestory, north and south aisles, a north porch, north and south transepts, a chancel, and a tower at the crossing. The tower has a parapet pierced with quatrefoils, and corner pinnacles, and on the west gable end is a bellcote with small flying buttresses and crocketed pinnacles. There are five-light windows in the transepts, and at the west and east ends.	I
Vicarage, St Saviour's Church, Richmond Hill; 53.79219°N 1.52676°W		c. 1845	The vicarage, later a private house, is in gritstone with a moulded eaves cornice, and a slate roof with coped gables and shaped kneelers. There are two storeys and fronts of four and two bays. The doorway has a pointed arch, the windows are lancets with trefoil heads, there is a canted bay window with an embattled cornice, and gabled half-dormers.	II
Wall, gateways, gates and railings, St Saviour's Church, Richmond Hill; 53.79217°N 1.52640°W		c. 1845	The boundary wall along the front of the church is in gritstone, with rounded coping and wrought iron railings, and the gates are in wood. There are three entrances: the entrance on the left has plain gate piers. The middle entrance has a cambered arch with a moulded and chamfered surround, surmounted by stepped copings and a cross, and the right entrance has jambs and a plain lintel.	II
St Mary's Convent Church; 53.79399°N 1.52635°W		1853–57	The church was designed by Joseph Hansom and William Wardell, and the chancel and transepts were added in 1866 by E. W. Pugin. The church is built in stone with a slate roof, and consists of a nave, north and south aisles, north and south transepts, and a chancel with a polygonal apse. The windows contain Decorated tracery, and in the transepts are rose windows. There are gables over the aisle windows and the windows in the apse.	II*
Mount St Mary's High School; 53.79362°N 1.52668°W	—	1861	Originally a convent with a college added in 1901, it is in stone with string courses and slate roofs. The school is built around a courtyard, with four storeys facing Church Road, and three storeys elsewhere. On the northeast side is a square tower with a hipped roof. The entrance is gabled, and contains a wide doorway with a three-light fanlight, and a segmental and stepped hood mould with carved heads, and an inscribed plaque to the right. Facing the courtyard are paired mullioned windows and canted bay windows.	II
Galli Family Monument; 53.80718°N 1.51521°W	—	c. 1864	The monument is in Beckett Street Cemetery, and is to the memory of members of the Galli family. It is in stone, and in Gothic Revival style. The monument has a polygonal chamfered base, a central column and an outer ring of columns with decorated capitals carrying arches with gablets and fleur-de-lis finials. Above this is another ring of simpler columns, arches and gablets, surmounted by a spire with crocketing and a final. On the lower central column are inscriptions.	II
Former presbytery, St Mary's Convent Church; 53.79432°N 1.52608°W	—	Late 19th century	The presbytery is in stone with string courses, and a slate roof with coped gables. There are two storeys and a basement, and three bays, the left bay projecting and with a covered passage to the church. Steps lead to the doorway that has a moulded architrave and a three-light fanlight. Above is a three-light ogee-headed window and a niche in the gable with a statue. The other windows include grouped lancets with transoms, mullioned windows, and a canted bay window.	II
St Hilda's Church, Cross Green; 53.78807°N 1.52083°W		1876–82	The church is in red brick with a slate roof, and is in Gothic Revival style. It consists of a nave and chancel under one roof with a clerestory, north and south aisles, and a north porch. On the north side at the junction of the nave and chancel is a slim circular turret with a conical spirelet, and on the west gable end is a double bellcote.	II
Vicarage, St Hilda's Church, Cross Green; 53.78809°N 1.52024°W	—	1876–82	The vicarage is in red brick with stone dressings and a slate roof with coped gables. There are two storeys and four bays. The doorway has a pointed arch, an ogee-shaped hood mould, crockets and a cross finial. The upper floor windows have mullions, the ground floor windows also have transoms, and there is a stair window.	II
St Agnes' Church, Burmantofts; 53.80495°N 1.51751°W		1886–87	The church is in stone and in Gothic Revival style. It consists of a nave and chancel under one roof with a clerestory, north and south aisles, and a southwest porch. At the west end of the south aisle is a bell turret with buttresses, an octagonal bell stage, and a short spire. The west window has four lights, and the east window has five.	II
St Patrick's Church, Burmantofts; 53.79912°N 1.52854°W		1889–91	The church, now used for other purposes, is in red brick with stone dressings and Welsh slate roofs. It consists of a nave and a chancel with a clerestory under one roof, a baptistry, north and south aisles, and an apse. At the entrance is a gabled porch and a doorway with a pointed arch, above which is a pointed nine-light window flanked by angle buttresses. Over the aisles on each side are five gables.	II
Sarah Kidney Monument; 53.80626°N 1.51764°W	—	c. 1895	The monument is in Beckett Street Cemetery, and is to the memory of Sarah Kidney and members of her family. It is in gritstone, and consists of a square base of three steps and a plinth, on which is a miniature square tapering industrial chimney about 3 metres (9.8 ft) high, with a cornice and a cap. On the plinth are inscriptions.	II
Former York Road Library and Baths; 53.79794°N 1.52012°W		1903	The entrance range survives, and is in red brick and stone with a Welsh slate roof, and is in Baroque style. The front is in two and three storeys and ten unequal bays, with two large gables in the centre, and a segmental gable over the left bay. The windows are a mix; some are mullioned and transomed, some are Venetian, and there is an oriel window. In the left bay is the round-arched entrance to the baths, and towards the right is the entrance to the library, also round-arched. Behind the left bay is a circular tower with an ogee leaded roof and a finial.	II
