= Prelude to Fame =

- Directed by: Fergus McDonell
- Written by: Aldous Huxley (story "Young Archimedes"); Robert Westerby; Bridget Boland
- Produced by: Donald B. Wilson
- Starring: Guy Rolfe; Kathleen Byron; Kathleen Ryan
- Cinematography: George Stretton
- Edited by: Sidney Hayers
- Music by: Muir Mathieson
- Production company: Two Cities Films
- Distributed by: General Film Distributors
- Release date: 2 May 1950
- Running time: 78 minutes
- Country: United Kingdom
- Language: English

Prelude to Fame is a 1950 British drama film set in Italy, directed by Fergus McDonell and starring Guy Rolfe, Kathleen Byron and Kathleen Ryan. It was written by Robert Westerby and Bridget Boland based on the 1924 story "Young Archimedes" by Aldous Huxley, about a mathematical prodigy who is also gifted in music.

== Plot ==
While vacationing in Italy, Nick Morell, son of John Morell, a famous English philosopher and amateur musician and his wife Catherine, becomes friendly with young Guido. Morell discovers Guido has an extraordinary instinct for orchestration and a phenomenal music memory. A neighbouring couple, Signor and Signora Boudini, become aware of the boy's talents, and the Signora appeals to Guido's parents to let her educate him musically. Torn between their love for their son and the duty they feel to let the world hear his talent, they eventually consent.

Guido is tutored by Dr. Lorenzo. Signora Bondini denies the boy all contact with his parents and everyone else except her. She also neither sends his letters to his family, nor lets him see the ones they have sent to him. He becomes phenomenally successful and makes the grand tour of Europe, while Signora Bondini is enraptured by the acclaim given her through her "discovery" of the boy. She prepares to take him to America and also prepares adoption papers.

== Cast ==
- Guy Rolfe as John Morell
- Kathleen Byron as Signora Anne Bondini
- Kathleen Ryan as Catherine Morell
- Jeremy Spenser as Guido Ferugia
- Henry Oscar as Signor Mario Bondini
- Rosalie Crutchley as Carlotta Ferugia
- John Slater as Dr. Lorenzo
- James Robertson Justice as Sir Arthur Harold
- Ferdy Mayne as Carlo Ferugia
- Robert Rietty as Giuseppe
- Robin Dowell as Nick Morell
- Hugo Schuster as Dr. Freihaus
- Michael Balfour as Lucio
- Christopher Lee as Newsman
- David McCallum Sr. as Leader of orchestra, Royal Albert Hall
- Dora Hyde as Leader of Orchestra, Naples
- Michael Croudson as Nick's friend
- Don Liddel as Benjamino
- Ben Williams as car driver
- Alex Fields as doorkeeper
- Penny Dane as Mmaid
- Leonard Trolley as waiter

== Production ==
It was made at Pinewood Studios with sets designed by the art director Frederick Pusey. This was the last film produced in the Rank Organisation's "Independent Frame" production system, an attempt to innovate filmmaking. When 12-year-old Jeremy Spenser was given the part, he spent many weeks before filming began being taught how to conduct an orchestra by Marcus Dods, who was, at that time, assistant to film composer / conductor Muir Mathieson, with the result that Jeremy's conducting scenes looked convincing.

== Reception ==
The Monthly Film Bulletin wrote: "A remarkable performance by Jeremy Spenser as a boy conductor, and some fine orchestral recordings, are the outstanding features of an otherwise undistinguished piece of film making. ... It is almost inevitable, with music as a frequent topic of conversation, that the script should be cluttered with pretentious dialogue; fortunately, the way the music is played is another matter. A highlight of this kind is the performance (in its entirety) of Weber's overture to Oberon, in which the expertly trained Master Spenser excels himself ... The grown-up members of the cast seem stiff and ill at ease, even allowing for the weakness of their material."

In The Radio Times Guide to Films David Parkinson gave the film 2/5 stars, writing: "Films about classical music have nearly always been box-office poison. This uninspired tale about a child prodigy whose tutor is his only refuge from expectation and exploitation was no exception. Adapted from a minor Aldous Huxley story, the film was directed with little flair by Fergus McDonell, who keeps the focus firmly on the sickly soloist, played rather well by Jeremy Spenser. The film was the last made using the ill-fated Independent Frame method, which aimed to cut costs by using back-projected interior scenery."
