= The Dark Island =

1962 British TV drama series

- Genre: Thriller
- Starring: Alistair Audsley; Angela Browne; Robert Hardy; Francis Matthews
- Country of origin: United Kingdom
- Original language: English
- No. of series: 1
- No. of episodes: 6 (all missing)

Original release
- Network: BBC Television
- Release: 8 July – 12 August 1962

The Dark Island is a six-part British television miniseries, produced by Gerard Glaister for the BBC. It premiered on 8 July 1962. It was later adapted for radio, which was transmitted in 1969. It was set on the Outer Hebridean island of Benbecula, though the majority of the series was filmed on South Uist. All six episodes are believed lost.

== Plot ==
The plot involves the discovery of a mysterious torpedo found on the shore of Benbecula. A naval team descends on the area to deal with the torpedo accompanied by Nicolson, an intrigued security officer. Further investigation of the torpedo reveals an international spy kit, the contents of which include a Finnish passport, British and Swedish currency, and most intriguing of all, a fragment of sheet music.

Nicolson is joined by fellow security operative Grant, and together they investigate the sudden appearance of the torpedo. Their investigations meet with resistance from the locals, and when their investigations lead to a murder, it becomes apparent that someone is trying to conceal something sinister. As Nicolson comes close to learning the truth, he is lured into a trap and is injured. When he comes to, he discovers that Grant has been murdered, and he endeavours to find the people responsible. He eventually uncovers an elaborate espionage operation.

== Cast ==
- Robert Hardy as Nicolson
- Francis Matthews as Grant
- Michael Barrington as Dr. Glenville
- Angela Browne as Mary Somers
- Wallace Campbell as Donald MacAulley
- Walter Carr as Davy McNeil
- James Copeland as Petty officer
- John Forbes-Robertson as Lieutenant
- Morag Forsyth as Margaret
- James Gibson as Dr. Mackenzie
- Michael Golden as Swanson
- Roy Hanlon as Corporal
- Denis Holmes as Major Williams
- Edward Jewesbury as George Hammond
- Cyril Luckham as Brigadier
- Alex McCrindle as Mr. Stewart
- Douglas Murchie as Alec Thomson
- Brydon Murdoch as Ian McLeod
- William Sherwood as Colonel Jamieson
- Ian Trigger as Attendant

== Theme tune ==
While the show is no longer seen, the theme tune remains a favourite with Scottish musicians, mostly accordionists and pipers. The air was originally called "Dr. Mackay's Farewell to Creagorry" by its composer, Iain MacLachlan about 1958. David Silver of Glasgow wrote the most common and famous words to the theme after the TV series appeared. Another set of lyrics was written by Stewart Ross of Inverness and is also quite well known, having been recorded by Calum and Fiona Kennedy as well as Daniel O' Donnell. Both sets of lyrics were published in 1963.

== Episode status ==
As of 2009, no episodes of The Dark Island have survived in the BBC archives; they were most likely wiped in the 1970s. The entire 1969 radio series, however, does still exist, and can be found at various internet sources, usually under the banner "Old Time Radio". The 1969 radio series is currently available (October 2023) via the BBC website. Further information regarding the TV series can be found on the Scotland On Air site.
