= Desirous of Change =

- Upstairs, Downstairs episode
- Episode no.: Season 3 Episode 6
- Directed by: Lionel Harris
- Written by: Fay Weldon
- Original air date: 1 December 1973

Episode chronology
| ← Previous "Rose's Pigeon" | Next → "Word of Honour" |

"Desirous of Change" is the sixth episode of the third series of the British television series, Upstairs, Downstairs. The episode is set in 1913.

== Plot ==
Richard Bellamy has a brief, steamy affair with a Vienna-born French Countess de Ternay, which ends on wistfully friendly terms when they both realise neither has the wealth that their public appearances imply. Gwyneth Davies falls in love with Richard Bellamy and goes away telling that it's time for her to leave for she is "desirous of change".

== Cast ==
- Angela Browne (Contesse Lili de Ternay)
- Sandor Eles (Kurt Schnabel)
- Janet Lees Price (Gwyneth Davies)
