= Follow Me! (TV programme) =

Television series

Follow Me! is a series of television programmes produced by Bayerischer Rundfunk and the BBC in the late 1970s to provide a crash course in the English language. It became popular in many overseas countries as a first introduction to English; in 1983, five hundred million people watched the show in China alone, featuring Kathy Flower.

Follow Me! was also shown regularly on SBS Television in Australia between 1981 and 1985 in tandem with another English tuition program, People You Meet.

The British actor Francis Matthews hosted and narrated the series.

The course consists of sixty lessons. Each lesson lasts from 12 to 15 minutes and covers a specific lexis. The lessons follow a consistent group of actors, with the relationships between their characters developing during the course.

== Follow Me! actors ==
- Francis Matthews
- Raymond Mason
- David Savile
- Ian Bamforth
- Keith Alexander
- Diane Mercer
- Jane Argyle
- Diana King
- Veronica Leigh
- Elaine Wells

== Episodes ==
1. "What's your name"
2. "How are you"
3. "Can you help me"
4. "Left, right, straight ahead"
5. "Where are they"
6. "What's the time"
7. "What's this What's that"
8. "I like it very much"
9. "Have you got any wine"
10. "What are they doing"
11. "Can I have your name, please"
12. "What does she look like"
13. "No smoking"
14. "It's on the first floor"
15. "Where's he gone"
16. "Going away"
17. "Buying things"
18. "Why do you like it"
19. "What do you need"
20. "I sometimes work late"
21. "Welcome to Britain"
22. "Who's that"
23. "What would you like to do"
24. "How can I get there?"
25. "Where is it"
26. "What's the date"
27. "Whose is it"
28. "I enjoy it"
29. "How many and how much"
30. "What have you done"
31. "Haven't we met before"
32. "What did you say"
33. "Please stop"
34. "How can I get to Brightly"
35. "Where can I get it"
36. "There's a concert on Wednesday"
37. "What's it like"
38. "What do you think of him"
39. "I need someone"
40. "What were you doing"
41. "What do you do"
42. "What do you know about him"
43. "You shouldn't do that"
44. "I hope you enjoy your holiday"
45. "Where can I see a football match"
46. "When will it be ready"
47. "Where did you go"
48. "I think it's awful"
49. "A room with a view"
50. "You'll be ill"
51. "I don't believe in strikes"
52. "They look tired"
53. "Would you like to"
54. "Holiday plans"
55. "The second shelf on the left"
56. "When you are ready"
57. "Tell them about Britain"
58. "I liked everything"
59. "Classical or modern"
60. "Finale"

== Broadcasting in other countries ==
In Nepal, the program was shown in Nepal Television. In Israel, it was shown in the Israeli Educational Television.. In Algeria it was shown between 1983 and 1985. In Portugal it was broadcast in 1983–1984. In Albania, it was shown on TVSH.
