= A Family Secret (Upstairs, Downstairs) =

- Upstairs, Downstairs episode
- Episode no.: Season 3 Episode 4
- Directed by: Raymond Menmuir
- Written by: Alfred Shaughnessy
- Original air date: 17 November 1973

Guest appearances
- Meg Wynn Owen (Hazel Forrest); Valerie White (Mrs. Forrest); Leonard Trolley (Mr. Arthur Forrest)

Episode chronology
← Previous "A Change of Scene"	Next → "Rose's Pigeon"

A Family Secret is the fourth episode of the third series of the British television series, Upstairs, Downstairs. The episode is set in 1912.

== Plot ==
James is immediately attracted to Hazel Forrest. The class divide between James and Hazel causes early conflicts with Hazel's parents, the Bellamys' staff and in the marriage. He wants to marry her. After about seven months of courting, James proposes in November, but Hazel declines his proposal and tearfully refuses him. She doesn't tell him that she was married before to a violent alcoholic named Patrick O'Connor. Hazel's sad past is now the Forrest's family secret. James don't know why she refuses him. This causes Hazel's father, Arthur Forrest, to visit James. He explains that Hazel was previously married to a drunk, Patrick O'Connor, who beat her. They divorced and Hazel moved back in with her parents. Mr. Forrest wants his daughter to be happy, while the prickly Mrs. Forrest is sure the Bellamys would never accept Hazel as a divorced woman (divorce being the shocking, stigmatic thing it was in 1912). After Hazel's initially declining James' proposal, James asks Hazel again, and after talking and James letting Hazel know his own sister Elizabeth is a divorced and remarried woman, she accepts his second proposal. They marry in late 1912 or early 1913, and honeymoon in Paris.

== Cast ==
=== Regular cast ===
- Gordon Jackson (Angus Hudson)
- Jean Marsh (Rose Buck)
- Joan Benham (Lady Prudence Fairfax)
- David Langton (Richard Bellamy)
- Simon Williams (James Bellamy)
- Angela Baddeley (Mrs. Bridges)
- Jenny Tomasin (Ruby)

=== Guest cast ===
- Meg Wynn Owen (Hazel Forrest)
- Valerie White (Mrs. Forrest)
- Leonard Trolley (Mr. Arthur Forrest)
