= Mount St Mary's Catholic High School, Leeds =

Mount St Mary's Catholic High School
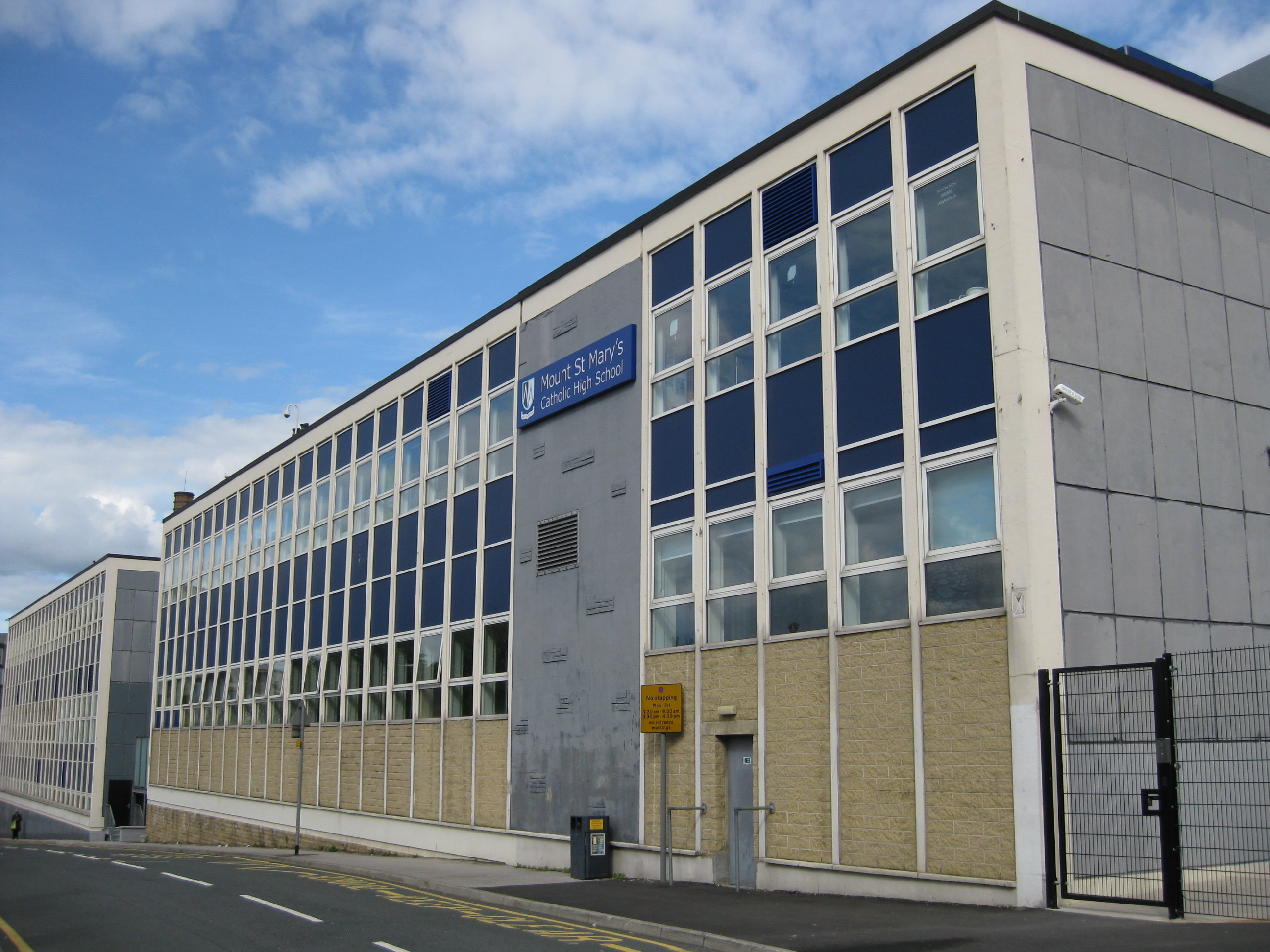

Location
- Ellerby Road; Leeds, West Yorkshire, LS9 8LA; England; 53.79386°N 1.52688°W

Information
- Type: Voluntary aided school
- Motto: Quid Retribuam
- Religious affiliation: Roman Catholic
- Established: 1853; 173 years ago
- Founder: Sisters Oblates of Mary Immaculate
- Local authority: City of Leeds
- Specialist: Maths & Computing
- Department for Education URN: 108097 Tables
- Ofsted: Reports
- Headteacher: Mark Cooper
- Gender: Mixed
- Age: 11 to 16
- Enrolment: 954
- Website: http://www.mountstmarys.org

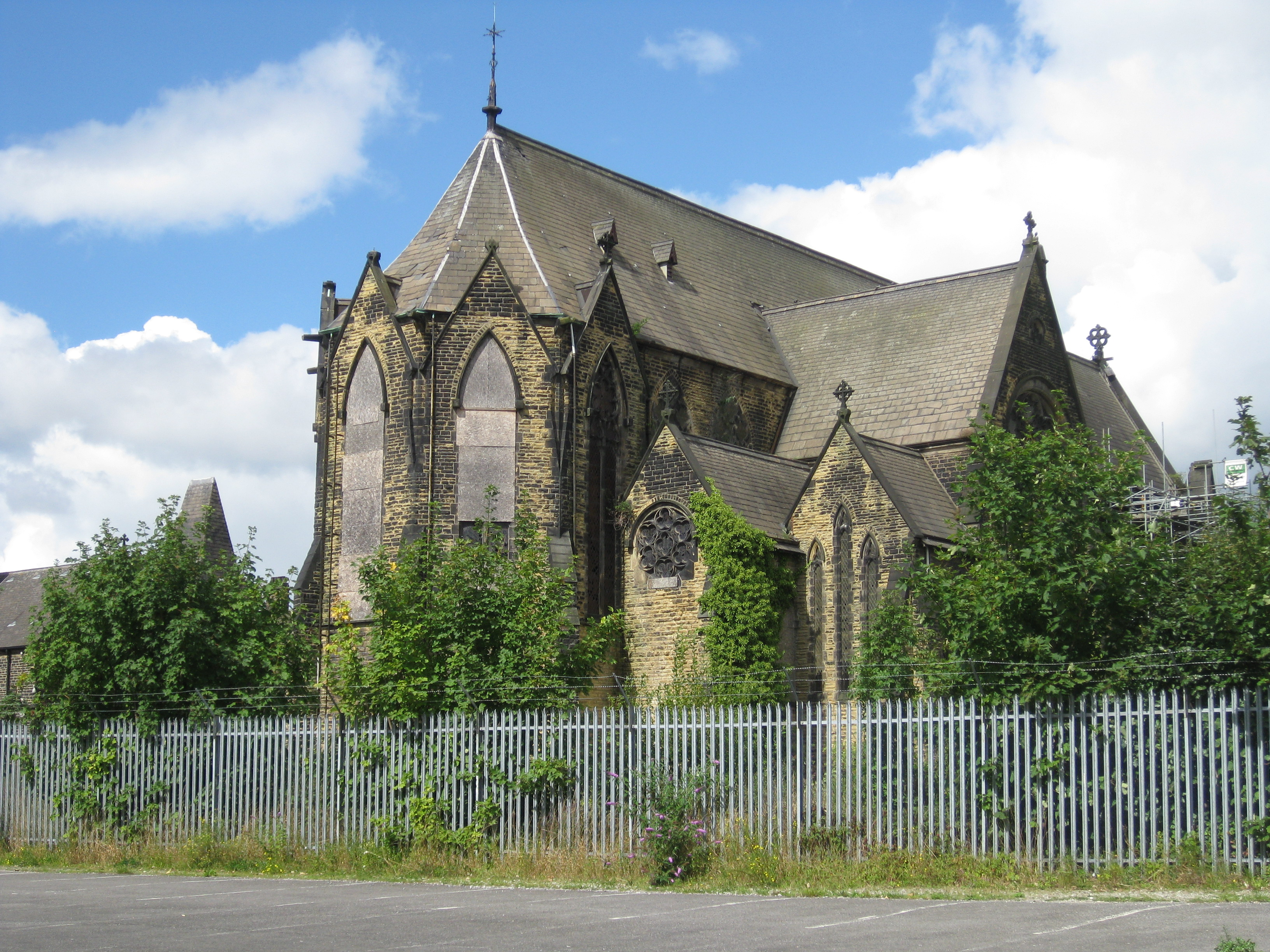
Mount St Mary's Church

Mount Saint Mary's School is a Roman Catholic secondary school in Leeds, England.

== History ==
Mount Saint Mary's School was founded in 1853 by the Sisters Oblates of Mary Immaculate. Father Robert Cooke, OMI, looked to the Sisters Oblates, who sent four sisters to establish a convent and school in the cellar of their convent. Many pupils were girls who worked in local flax mills and factories. By 1858 the sisters had raised enough funds to build a convent next to Mount Saint Mary's Church. More fundraising by the Sisters soon produced the £800 needed for new school buildings that were erected next to the Convent. It became a girls' Secondary Modern in 1946, at the same time as St Michael's College became a Grammar School. In 1978, Mount St Mary's and St Michael's College both became comprehensives.

== Different parts of the school ==
There are three main buildings at Mount St Mary's, one is the oldest building consisting of most parts of the school, one is home to many important parts to the school and is split in half and the last one is the sports department. If including all outdoor areas then the whole school is roughly 28,000 square metres in size.

== Admissions ==
Mount Saint Mary's is a Faith school for ages 11–16 in Richmond Hill. Catholic education after 16 is found at Notre Dame Catholic Sixth Form College (former Notre Dame Collegiate School, the other girls' direct grant grammar school in Leeds). It is situated just north of the A61, next to the derelict church of Mount St Mary which opened in 1857 and closed in 1989.

=== St Michael's College ===
This was a former boys' direct grant grammar school on St John's Road in the Hyde Park area of Leeds, the analogous school to the girls' Notre Dame Collegiate School. It later became a comprehensive school, St Michael's Catholic College. It was a Jesuit college which opened as Leeds Catholic College on 18 September 1905, becoming St Michael's College in 1933. It had the motto "Quis ut deus" (Who is like God), a translation of the Hebrew "Mikha'el", meaning God like.

=== Merger ===
Mount St Mary's announced a merger with St Michael's College of St John's Road in Hyde Park after a review by the diocese found that there was no longer a need for four catholic secondary schools in Leeds. St Michael's is no longer in operation. The remaining Year 7 pupils who began education at the school in 2005 were transferred to Mount St Mary's after the schools merged the same year. The last year group to move through the site left in 2008.

St George's Crypt, a Leeds homeless charity, used the site temporarily.

== Alumni ==
- David Doherty, rugby union player
- Andy Lynch, former rugby league player
- Tom Elliott, former Leeds United striker
- Barbara Keeley, Labour MP for Worsley and Eccles South
- Chris Moyles, BBC Radio 1 DJ
- Darren Cullen, artist and musician
- Nadine Mulkerrin, actress

=== St Michael's College ===
- Colin Burgon, Labour MP for Elmet from 1997 to 2010
- Derek Enright, Labour MP for Hemsworth, 1991–1995
- John Grogan, Labour MP for Selby from 1997 to 2010
- Francis Matthews, actor
- John Porter, musician and record producer of some Smiths' albums including The Smiths
- Dave Prentis, Baron Prentis of Leeds, General Secretary of UNISON 2001-2021
- David Stubbs, journalist
- Jake Thackray, singer
- Fr Edward Yarnold
- Valentine Pelka, actor
- Steve Nallon, actor and Spitting Image impressionist

== See also ==
- List of direct grant grammar schools
- Mount St Mary's College, private catholic boarding school in Spinkhill, north Derbyshire
- Listed buildings in Leeds (Burmantofts and Richmond Hill Ward)
