= Mount St Mary's Church, Leeds =

Church in Leeds, West Yorkshire, England

Coordinates: 53.794000°N 1.526707°W

Mount St Mary's Church
- Church of the Immaculate Virgin Mary
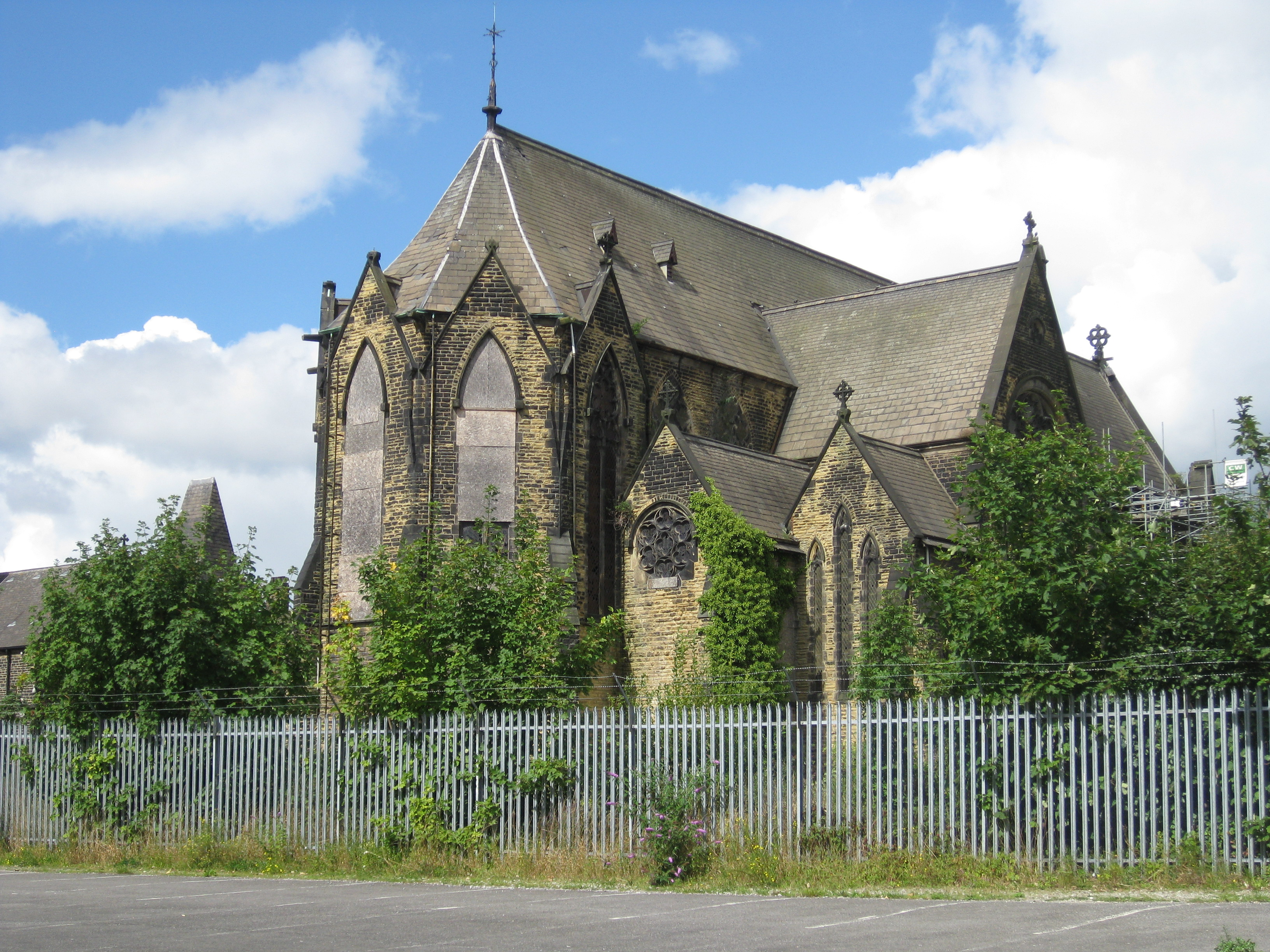
- East side of the church

- Location in West Yorkshire
- OS grid reference: SE 31304 33169
- Location: Richmond Hill, Leeds
- Country: England
- Denomination: Roman Catholic

History
- Status: Closed
- Founded: 1851
- Founder: Missionary Oblates of Mary Immaculate
- Dedication: Blessed Virgin Mary
- Dedicated: 29 July 1857

Architecture
- Functional status: Redundant church
- Heritage designation: Grade II* listed
- Designated: 5 August 1976
- Architect(s): Joseph Hansom; Edward Pugin
- Style: Gothic Revival
- Groundbreaking: 24 May 1853
- Completed: 13 September 1866
- Construction cost: £8,000
- Closed: June 1989

Specifications
- Length: 165 ft (50 m)
- Width: 100 ft (30 m)
- Height: 85 ft (26 m)

Mount St Mary's Church or the Church of the Immaculate Virgin Mary is a Grade II* listed building and a redundant Roman Catholic church in Leeds, West Yorkshire, England. It was founded in 1851 and designed by Joseph Hansom, with extensions by Edward Pugin. It is next to Mount St Mary's Catholic High School, Leeds. Part of the church was demolished in 2024 to make way for flats.

== History ==
=== Foundation ===
In 1851, the Missionary Oblates of Mary Immaculate came to Leeds to start a mission to the local Catholics. They were persuaded to do so by a group of men from St Saviour's Church in Leeds, who had left the Anglican church and become Roman Catholics. There were already two Catholic churches in the city, St Anne's Church at one end and St Patrick's Church at the other. There was no church for the Richmond Hill area of the city and the Irish migrants living in the east of Leeds. Fr. Crowe OMI, the first priest of the mission, raised funds for acquiring a site for the church. It was also named the 'Famine Church' because it was built during the recovery of the Irish population from the Great Irish Famine and was seen by the survivors as a sign of hope after the period of mass starvation.

=== Construction ===
On 24 May 1853, the foundation stone of the church was laid by the Bishop of Beverley, John Briggs. The architect was Joseph Hansom. He also designed Plymouth Cathedral and the Church of St Walburge in Preston, both of which, like Mount St Mary's Church, are in the Gothic Revival style. In the same year, Mount Saint Mary's School was founded next door to the church. It was staffed by the Sisters Oblates of Mary Immaculate. They were housed in a nearby convent and also used the church as their place of worship.

On 29 July 1857, the church was dedicated in a ceremony presided over by Bishop Briggs. The ceremony was notable, because in attendance were the Archbishop of Westminster, Cardinal Nicholas Wiseman, his successor Henry Manning and the founder of the Oblates, Eugène de Mazenod, who was made a saint in 1995. They processed through the city streets before having Mass in the church.

The church was not complete; only the nave and side aisles were built. The chancel and transepts were designed by Edward Pugin, who was a partner in Joseph Hansom's architectural firm from 1862 to 1863. When the chancel and transepts were completed, the church in its entirety was opened on 13 September 1866. The main celebrant at the ceremony was the Archbishop of Westminster, Cardinal Manning.

In 1916, a tower building fund was started to collect donations for the construction of a tower which was in the original church architectural plans. However, this was during the First World War and no tower was built.

=== Repairs ===
As the church sits on Richmond Hill, it is exposed to strong winds. In December 1894 and February 1962, the church was damaged and needed to be repaired. From the 1930s to the 1950s, the church was renovated. Major repairs and renovation also took place from 1980 to 1981. In 1953, during renovation work, an old coal mine was discovered underneath the church. A mine shaft, that could be accessed through the sacristy, was blocked off during the church's construction. Leeds Council had no records of the mine, but it did confirm a local suspicion that a nearby coal mine once existed. A study by Leeds City Council in August 2007 recorded that more than one mine exists, at three different levels, dating from the late 1600s to 1877.

=== Rehousing ===
From 1935 to 1950, much of the local population was moved to new houses in the Osmondthorpe area in east Leeds. This re-housing of population caused the parish of Mount St Mary's to halve in size before the Second World War. It went from 6,000 people to 3,000. After the Second World War it stood at 1,100 people. Postwar efforts to invite people back to the area did not succeed and by 1979, the parish population was 790 people.

=== Post-Vatican II ===
In 1953 the orphanage, that the sisters ran from 1853, closed. More than 3,000 children passed through it during its existence. In June 1967, it was decided to build a new parish social centre for the church.

On 18 October 1964, after the Second Vatican Council, a new English liturgy was introduced to the parish. On 11 April 1965 it was inaugurated and then said at all future Masses. In July 1971 a new altar was added to allow the priest to say Mass facing the congregation. In April 1978, a parish council was introduced. In the same year, Mount St Mary's School became a comprehensive.

On 30 November 1986, the link between the church and the nearby Anglican church, St Saviour's, led to an official 'Covenant Declaration to Witness and Work Together'. This was signed by David Konstant, Roman Catholic Bishop of Leeds, and David Young, Anglican Bishop of Ripon.

== Architecture ==
=== Exterior ===
The church is an example of nineteenth-century Gothic Revival architecture. It has a brick exterior, and a steep slated roof similar to the main parts of St Walburge Church in Preston and Plymouth Cathedral, both by the same architect, Joseph Hansom. It has a tall nave and a semi-circular chancel. It is east facing with north and south transepts. Each transept has a rose window above three smaller lancet windows.

There are gables above the windows over the aisles and above the polygonal apse, with Greek crosses carved into them. The tracery is decorated, including the large west window. It has geometric tracery with an arched doorway below. Included with the windows are hood moulds to stop rainwater hitting the stonework below.

=== Interior ===
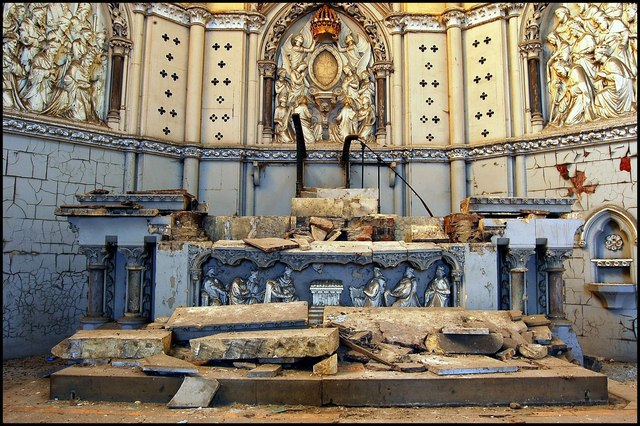
Smashed altar

There is one central aisle with two narrower ones on either side. There are columns, each supporting a Gothic arch, either side of the main aisle, six from the back to the chancel. From there, there are seven steps leading up to the sanctuary with two more columns until the bay-shaped sanctuary. The bay has three gothic arches around it, separating it from the back east side of the church. The altar is marble, but the top surface of it has been smashed into pieces since the church was closed. Around the altar are three sculptures set into the wall. The centre one depicts angels; the north side one depicts church leaders and saints; and the south side one depicts royalty, all kneeling towards an emblem of the Blessed Sacrament being crowned by the angels.

In the north aisle, confessionals still remain. The floor in the nave is wooden, while the floor in the sanctuary is tiled. Some of the windows still survive in the church, because they have protective screens on them. They were by Hardman & Co.

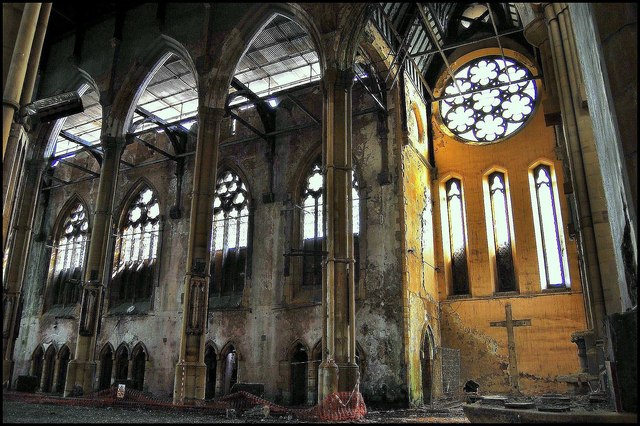
North transept

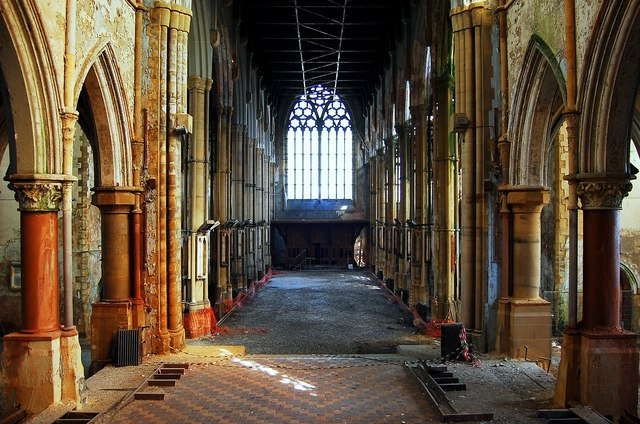
View from the sanctuary

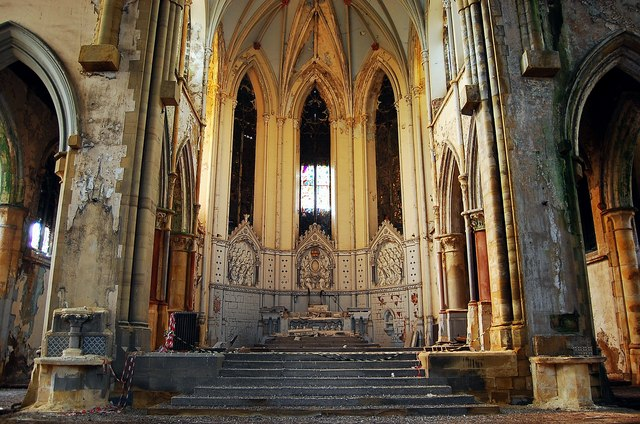
Sanctuary

== Parish ==
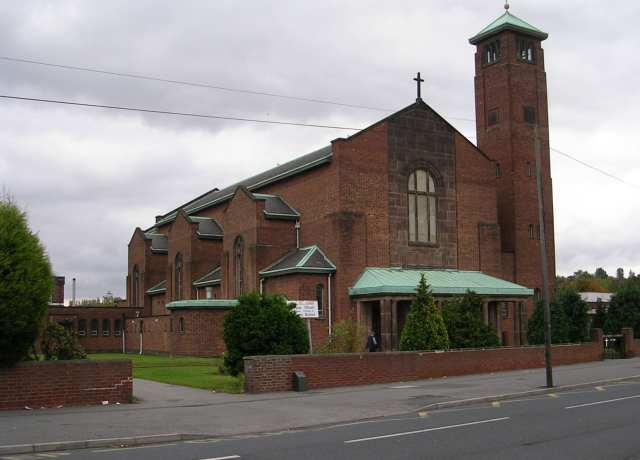
Corpus Christi Church, created from the parish of Mount St Mary's

To cater for the moved Catholic congregation in Osmondthorpe, a daughter parish of Mount St Mary's was built, Corpus Christi Church. This was also staffed by the Oblates. It was originally a wooden building, built next to the presbytery. In the early 1950s, it was burnt to the ground by a fire. In the 1960s, work started on the present church and it was opened in 1962.

The Oblates served the Corpus Christi parish until 2008 when they handed it over to the Diocese of Leeds who continue to administer the church. In 2011, together with St Theresa of the Child Jesus Church in Cross Gates and St Gregory the Great Church in Swarcliffe, it became part of the Parish of Blessed John Henry Newman.

== Closure ==
With the parish population shrinking and the cost of maintaining the church increasing, the Oblates decided to withdraw from the parish. The bill of repairing the church was estimated to be £1.5 million, which was considered to be too expensive for a church with a reduced congregation.

In June 1989, the Oblates of Mary Immaculate handed over administration of the parish to the Diocese of Leeds. It was deconsecrated on the departure of the Oblates. Together they worked to sell the church and hoped that it would still be function in a different role for the local community. In 1996, it was sold to Sanctuary Housing Trust for a nominal amount. Since its sale it has remained unused. Scaffolding is visible around the church, showing that only essential repairs to make the building structurally safe have been carried out.

It has been named by the Victorian Society as a heritage building at risk of disrepair.

== List of Superiors ==
The priests in charge of the parish, from the Missionary Oblates of Mary Immaculate, were:

- 1851–56: Fr Cooke
- 1856–67: Fr Pinet
- 1867–75: Fr Redmond
- 1875–85: Fr Pinet
- 1885–88: Fr J. O’Reilly
- 1888–90: Fr Coyle
- 1890–04: Fr Roche
- 1904–08: Fr E. Matthews
- 1908–22: Fr D. O’Ryan
- 1922–25: Fr J. Gorman
- 1925–31: Fr M. Butler
- 1931–32: Fr M. O’Ryan
- 1932–36: Fr T. Foley
- 1936–42: Fr McManus
- 1942–48: Fr Clavin
- 1948–54: Fr Clery
- 1954–60: Fr P. Glasheen
- 1960–66: Fr Sean Connellan
- 1966–72: Fr D’Arcy
- 1972–75: Fr L. Keogh
- 1975–81: Fr M. Phelan
- 1981–87: Fr Michael McGhee
- 1987–88: Fr Richard O’Donovan
- 1988–89: Fr Patrick Mee

== See also ==
- Mount St Mary's Catholic High School, Leeds
- Missionary Oblates of Mary Immaculate
- Diocese of Leeds
- Grade II* listed buildings in Leeds
- Listed buildings in Leeds (Burmantofts and Richmond Hill Ward)
