= List of English actors =

English actors and actresses

Listed below are actors and actresses of note and some notable individuals born in England.

== Actors and actresses ==
=== A-C ===
- Amanda Abbington (born 1972)
- Marisa Abela (born 1996)
- Naomi Ackie (born 1991)
- Joss Ackland (1928–2023)
- Nykiya Adams (born 2009/2010)
- Mark Addy (born 1964)
- Jenny Agutter (born 1952)
- Freema Agyeman (born 1979)
- Jassa Ahluwalia (born 1990)
- Anthony Ainley (1932–2004)
- Caroline Aherne (1963–2016)
- John Alderton (born 1940)
- Sophie Aldred (born 1962)
- Ben Aldridge (born 1985)
- Michael Aldridge (1920–1994)
- Freya Allan (born 2001)
- David Ames (born 1983)
- Gillian Anderson (born 1968)
- Jacob Anderson (born 1990)
- Adjoa Andoh (born 1963)
- Dame Julie Andrews (born 1935)
- Vanessa Angel (born 1966)
- Richard Armitage (born 1971)
- Alexander Armstrong (born 1970)
- Debbie Arnold (born 1955)
- Emily Atack (born 1989)
- Eileen Atkins (born 1934)
- Emma Atkins (born 1975)
- Sir Richard Attenborough (1923–2014)
- Lorraine Ashbourne (born 1961)
- Peggy Ashcroft (1907–1991)
- Simone Ashley (born 1995)
- Lena Ashwell (1872–1957)
- Rowan Atkinson (born 1955)
- Greg Austin (born 1992)
- Rose Ayling-Ellis (born 1994)
- Sophia Baddeley (1745–1786)
- Hermione Baddeley (1906–1986)
- Bill Bailey (born 1965)
- Jonathan Bailey (born 1988)
- Colin Baker (born 1943)
- Kenny Baker (1934–2016)
- Gillian Barber (born 1958)
- Ronnie Barker (1929–2005)
- Lynda Baron (1939–2022)
- Sacha Baron Cohen (born 1971)
- Emma Barton (born 1977)
- Alfie Bass (1916–1987)
- Helen Baxendale (born 1970)
- Sean Bean (born 1959)
- Kate Beckinsale (born 1973)
- Geoffrey Beevers (born 1941)
- Jamie Bell (born 1986)
- Dorothy Bellew (1891–1973)
- Eliza Bennett (born 1992)
- Rosalind Bennett (born 1966)
- Martin Benson (1918–2010)
- Ruby Bentall (born 1988)
- Steven Berkoff (born 1937)
- Matt Berry (born 1974)
- Paul Bettany (born 1971)
- Simon Bird (born 1984)
- John Bishop (born 1966)
- Brian Blessed (born 1936)
- Brenda Blethyn (born 1946)
- Orlando Bloom (born 1977)
- Emily Blunt (born 1983)
- Dirk Bogarde (1921–1999)
- Jordan Bolger (born 1994)
- Samantha Bond (born 1961)
- John Boyega (born 1992)
- Lucretia Bradshaw (fl. 1714-1741)
- Richard Briers (1934–2013)
- Kellie Bright (born 1976)
- Tony Britton (1924–2019)
- Millie Bobby Brown (born 2004)
- Kelly Brook (born 1979)
- June Brown (1927–2022)
- Jessica Brown Findlay (born 1987)
- Nicola Bryant (born 1960)
- Scarlett Byrne (born 1990)
- James Buckley (born 1987)
- Jeremy Bulloch (1945–2020)
- Kathy Burke (born 1964)
- Saffron Burrows (born 1972)
- Asa Butterfield (born 1997)
- Sebastian Cabot (1918–1977)
- Sir Michael Caine (born 1933)
- Harriet Cains (born 1993)
- Cheryl Campbell (born 1949)
- Brian Cant (1933–2017)
- Emily Carey (born 2003)
- Raquel Cassidy (born 1968)
- Fanny Carby (1925–2002)
- Liz Carr (born 1972)
- Helena Bonham Carter (born 1966)
- Jim Carter (born 1948)
- Laura Carmichael (born 1986)
- Kim Cattrall (born 1956)
- Caroline Catz (born 1969)
- Jessie Cave (born 1987)
- Julian Chagrin (born 1940)
- Emma Chambers (1964–2018)
- Gemma Chan (born 1982)
- Anna Chancellor (born 1965)
- Ben Chaplin (born 1969)
- Graham Chapman (1941–1989)
- Ellise Chappell (born 1992)
- Craig Charles (born 1964)
- Mark Charnock (born 1968)
- Keith Chegwin (1957–2017)
- Selina Chilton (born 1981)
- Esme Church (1893–1972)
- Noel Clarke (born 1975)
- John Cleese (born 1939)
- Martin Clunes (born 1961)
- Jenna Coleman (born 1986)
- Dame Joan Collins (born 1933)
- José Collins (1887–1958)
- Michelle Collins (born 1962)
- Pauline Collins (1940–2025)
- Olivia Colman (born 1974)
- Robbie Coltrane (1950–2022)
- Jodie Comer (born 1993)
- Kit Connor (born 2004)
- Peter Cook (1937–1995)
- Olivia Cooke (born 1993)
- Emma Corrin (born 1995)
- Daniel Craig (born 1968)
- Rosalie Craig (born 1981)
- Michael Crawford (born 1942)
- Chanel Cresswell (born 1990)
- Lenora Crichlow (born 1985)
- Mackenzie Crook (born 1971)
- Rosalie Crutchley (1920–1997)
- Abigail Cruttenden (born 1968)
- Benedict Cumberbatch (born 1976)
- Dan Cunningham (1917–2001)
- Tim Curry (1946–2026)
- Peter Cushing (1913–1994)

=== D-F ===
- Emma D'Arcy (born 1992)
- Hugh Dancy (born 1975)
- Jane Danson (born 1978)
- Arthur Darvill (born 1982)
- Jack Davenport (born 1973)
- Joanna David (born 1947)
- Lucy Davis (born 1973)
- Phil Davis (born 1953)
- Warwick Davis (born 1970)
- Peter Davison (born 1951)
- Anthony Dawson (1916–1992)
- Ashley Taylor Dawson
- Daniel Day-Lewis (born 1957)
- Letitia Dean (born 1967)
- Dame Olivia de Havilland (1916–2020)
- Roger Delgado (1918–1973)
- Dame Judi Dench (born 1934)
- Eileen Derbyshire (born 1931)
- Sacha Dhawan (born 1984)
- Lisa Dillon (born 1979)
- Michelle Dockery (born 1981)
- Hannah Dodd (born 1995)
- Erin Doherty (born 1992)
- Robert Donat (1905–1958)
- Diana Dors (1931–1984)
- Sarah Douglas (actress) (born 1952)
- Kevin Doyle (born 1959 or 1960)
- Minnie Driver (born 1970)
- Anne-Marie Duff (born 1970)
- Janine Duvitski (born 1952)
- Danny Dyer (born 1977)
- Phoebe Dynevor (born 1995)
- Sally Dynevor (born 1963)
- Christopher Eccleston (born 1964)
- Adrian Edmondson (born 1957)
- Daisy Edgar-Jones (born 1998)
- Tamsin Egerton (born 1988)
- Samantha Eggar (1939–2025)
- Jennifer Ehle (born 1969)
- Chiwetel Ejiofor (born 1977)
- Victoria Ekanoye (born 1981)
- Idris Elba (born 1972)
- Fady Elsayed (born 1993)
- Jennifer Ellison (born 1983)
- Nathalie Emmanuel (born 1989)
- Harry Enfield (born 1961)
- Cynthia Erivo (born 1987)
- Alice Eve (born 1982)
- Rupert Everett (born 1959)
- Craig Fairbrass (born 1964)
- Lucy Fallon (born 1995)
- JJ Feild (born 1978)
- Tom Felton (born 1987)
- Emerald Fennell (born 1985)
- Perry Fenwick (born 1962)
- Joseph Fiennes (born 1970)
- Ralph Fiennes (born 1962)
- Hero Fiennes Tiffin (born 1997)
- Siobhan Finneran (born 1966)
- Yasmin Finney (born 2003)
- Colin Firth (born 1960)
- Dexter Fletcher (born 1966)
- Georgia May Foote (born 1991)
- Beatrice Forbes-Robertson Hale (1883–1967)
- Kate Ford (born 1976)
- Jamie Foreman (born 1958)
- Claire Forlani (born 1971)
- George Formby (1904–1961)
- Edward Fox (born 1937)
- Emilia Fox (born 1974)
- James Fox (born 1939)
- Freddie Fox (born 1989)
- Claire Foy (born 1984)
- James Frain (born 1968)
- Richard Franklin (1936–2023)
- Lynne Frederick (1954–1994)
- Martin Freeman (born 1971)
- Anna Friel (born 1976)
- Joanne Froggatt (born 1980)
- Nick Frost (born 1972)
- Sadie Frost (born 1965)
- Emma Fryer (born 1980)

=== G-I ===
- Dean Gaffney (born 1978)
- Nicholas Galitzine (born 1994)
- Sir Michael Gambon (1940–2023)
- William Gao (born 2003)
- Romola Garai (born 1982)
- Patricia Garwood (1941–2019)
- Mark Gatiss (born 1966)
- Genevieve Gaunt (born 1991)
- Ruth Gemmell (born 1967)
- Helen George (born 1984)
- Millie Gibson (born 2004)
- Sir John Gielgud (1904–2000)
- Mandip Gill (born 1988)
- Philip Glenister (born 1963)
- Caroline Goodall (born 1959)
- Matthew Goode (born 1978)
- Sarah Gordy (born 1976)
- Mia Goth (born 1993)
- Julia Goulding (born 1985)
- Stephen Graham (born 1973)
- Holliday Grainger (born 1988)
- Cary Grant (1904–1986)
- Hugh Grant (born 1960)
- Leslie Grantham (1947–2018)
- Bertram Grassby (1880–1953)
- Sydney Greenstreet (1879–1954)
- John Gregson (1919–1975)
- Simon Gregson (born 1974)
- Tamsin Greig (born 1966)
- Rupert Grint (born 1988)
- Sienna Guillory (born 1975)
- Sir Alec Guinness (1914–2000)
- Natalie Gumede (born 1984)
- Jessica Gunning (born 1986)
- Rachel Gurney (1920–2001)
- Sarah Hadland (born 1971)
- Harry Hadden-Paton (born 1981)
- Binnie Hale (1899–1984)
- Sonnie Hale (1902–1959)
- Chelsea Halfpenny (born 1991)
- Brian Hall (1937–1997)
- Charlie Hall (1899–1959)
- Rebecca Hall (born 1982)
- Alan Halsall (born 1982)
- Robert Hardy (1925–2017)
- Tom Hardy (born 1977)
- Gordon Harker (1885–1967)
- Dani Harmer (born 1989)
- Ricci Harnett (born 1973)
- Frank Harper (born 1962)
- Naomie Harris (born 1976)
- Richard Harris (1930–2002)
- Blake Harrison (born 1985)
- Rosemary Harris (born 1927)
- Miranda Hart (born 1972)
- William Hartnell (1908–1975)
- Nigel Havers (born 1951)
- Keeley Hawes (born 1976)
- Jack Hawkins (1910–1973)
- Sally Hawkins (born 1976)
- David Hawthorne (1888–1942)
- Nigel Hawthorne (1929–2001)
- Charles Hawtrey (1914–1988)
- Will Hay (1888–1949)
- Georgie Henley (born 1995)
- Ruthie Henshall (born 1967)
- Elizabeth Henstridge (born 1987)
- Jessica Henwick (born 1992)
- Audrey Hepburn (1929–1993)
- Tom Hiddleston (born 1981)
- Freddie Highmore (born 1992)
- Jacqueline Hill (1929–1993)
- Dame Wendy Hiller (1912–2003)
- Frazer Hines (born 1944)
- Thora Hird (1911–2003)
- Patricia Hodge (born 1946)
- Tom Holland (born 1996)
- Tom Hollander (born 1967)
- Stanley Holloway (1890–1982)
- James Hooton (born 1973)
- Sir Michael Hordern (1911–1995)
- Jeff Hordley (born 1970)
- Bob Hoskins (1942–2014)
- Nicholas Hoult (born 1989)
- Leslie Howard (1893–1943)
- Sally Ann Howes (1930–2021)
- Annie Hulley (born 1955)
- Florence Hunt (born 2007)
- Rosie Huntington-Whiteley (born 1987)
- Rachel Hurd-Wood (born 1990)
- Elizabeth Hurley (born 1965)
- John Hurt (1940–2017)
- Jessica Hynes (born 1972)
- Damson Idris (born 1991)
- Celia Imrie (born 1952)
- Kerry Ingram (born 1999)
- Harold Innocent (1933–1993)
- Jeremy Irons (born 1948)
- Jeremy Irvine (born 1990)

=== J-L ===
- Derek Jacobi (born 1938)
- Freda Jackson (1907–1990)
- Glenda Jackson (1936–2023)
- Oliver Jackson-Cohen (born 1986)
- Julia James (1890–1964)
- Lennie James (born 1965)
- Theo James (born 1984)
- Robert James-Collier (born 1976)
- Sir David Jason (born 1940)
- Ernest Jay (1893–1957)
- Michael Jayston (1935–2024)
- Dominic Jephcott (born 1957)
- Claudia Jessie (born 1990)
- Rosamund John (1913–1998)
- Aaron Johnson (born 1990)
- Sue Johnston (born 1943)
- Felicity Jones (born 1983)
- Gemma Jones (born 1942)
- Suranne Jones (born 1978)
- Toby Jones (born 1966)
- Paterson Joseph (born 1964)
- Noah Jupe (born 2005)
- Tamla Kari (born 1988)
- Boris Karloff (1887–1969)
- Robbie Kay (born 1995)
- Toby Kebbell (born 1982)
- Malcolm Keen (1887–1970)
- William Kempe (died 1603)
- Roberta Kerr (born 1952)
- Daniel Kaluuya (born 1989)
- Penelope Keith (born 1940)
- Madge Kendal (1848–1935)
- Skandar Keynes (born 1991)
- Guz Khan (born 1986)
- Sir Ben Kingsley (born 1943)
- Alex Kingston (born 1963)
- Vanessa Kirby (born 1987)
- Keira Knightley (born 1985)
- Barbara Knox (born 1933)
- Bobby Knutt (1945–2017)
- Jonny Labey (born 1993)
- Sarah Lancashire (born 1964)
- Bonnie Langford (born 1964)
- Lillie Langtry (1853–1929)
- Maeve Larkin (fl. 2026)
- Charles Laughton (1899–1962)
- Stan Laurel (1890–1965)
- Hugh Laurie (born 1959)
- Ian Lavender (1946–2024)
- Jude Law (born 1972)
- Josie Lawrence (born 1959)
- Wingold Lawrence (1874–1938)
- Alex Lawther (born 1995)
- Ellie Leach (born 2001)
- Christopher Lee (1922–2015)
- Jane Leeves (born 1961)
- Vivien Leigh (1913–1967)
- Madge Lessing (1873–1966)
- Michael Le Vell (born 1964)
- Damian Lewis (born 1971)
- Jessie Mei Li (born 1995)
- Andrew Lincoln (born 1973)
- Letty Lind (1861–1923)
- Ralf Little (born 1980)
- Ricardo P Lloyd (born 1993)
- Margaret Lockwood (1916–1990)
- Samia Longchambon (born 1982)
- Lily Loveless (born 1990)
- Alice Lowe (born 1977)
- Gary Lucy (born 1981)
- Zöe Lucker (born 1974)
- Joanna Lumley (born 1946)
- Lashana Lynch (born 1987)
- Louisa Lytton (born 1989)

=== M-O ===
- Danny Mac (born 1988)
- Matthew Macfadyen (born 1974)
- George MacKay (born 1992)
- Pearl Mackie (born 1987)
- Patrick Macnee (1922–2015)
- Ashley Madekwe (born 1983)
- Rebecca Mader (born 1977)
- Richard Madden (born 1986)
- Jessica Madsen (born 1992)
- Miles Mander (1888–1946)
- Katy Manning (born 1946)
- Lesley Manville (born 1956)
- Elspeth March (1911–1999)
- Miriam Margolyes (born 1941)
- Roy Marsden (born 1941)
- Eddie Marsan (born 1968)
- Kris Marshall (born 1973)
- James Mason (1909–1984)
- Anna Massey (1937–2011)
- Dorcas Matthews (1890–1969)
- Abby Mavers (born 1990)
- Anna Maxwell-Martin (born 1977)
- Rik Mayall (1958–2014)
- Bill Maynard (1928–2018)
- Gugu Mbatha-Raw (born 1983)
- Deborah McAndrew (born 1967)
- Joanna McCallum (born 1950)
- Lillah McCarthy (1875–1960)
- Helen McCrory (1968–2021)
- Martine McCutcheon (born 1976)
- Steve McFadden (born 1959)
- Colin McFarlane (born 1961)
- Paul McGann (born 1959)
- Gibb McLaughlin (1884–1960)
- Sir Ian McKellen (born 1939)
- Mia McKenna-Bruce (born 1997)
- Gus McNaughton (1881–1969)
- Ian McShane (born 1942)
- Sophie McShera (born 1985)
- Will Mellor (born 1976)
- Carla Mendonça (born 1961)
- Tobias Menzies (born 1974)
- Stephen Merchant (born 1974)
- Robin Merrill (born 20th century)
- Jennifer Metcalfe (born 1983)
- Tuppence Middleton (born 1987)
- Sienna Miller (born 1981)
- Hayley Mills (born 1946)
- Sir John Mills (1908–2005)
- Dame Helen Mirren (born 1945)
- Jimi Mistry (born 1973)
- Georgia Tennant (née Moffett) (born 1984)
- Ambika Mod (born 1995)
- Dominic Monaghan (born 1976)
- Sir Roger Moore (1927–2017)
- William Moore (1916–2000)
- Hattie Morahan (born 1978)
- Nick Moran (born 1969)
- Kenneth More (1914–1982)
- Joseph Morgan (born 1981)
- Neil Morrissey (born 1962)
- Samantha Morton (born 1977)
- Laila Morse (born 1945)
- William Moseley (born 1987)
- Stephen Moyer (born 1969)
- Carey Mulligan (born 1985)
- Billy Murray (born 1941)
- Sophia Myles (born 1980)
- Parminder Nagra (born 1975)
- Cathleen Nesbitt (1888–1982)
- Hannah New (born 1984)
- Guy Newall (1885–1937)
- Anthony Newley (1931–1999)
- Luke Newton (born 1993)
- Sue Nicholls (born 1943)
- Lesley Nicol (born 1953)
- Bill Nighy (born 1949)
- David Niven (1910–1983)
- Christine Norden (1924–1988)
- Clair Norris (born 1997)
- Hermione Norris (born 1967)
- David Oakes (born 1983)
- Tracy-Ann Oberman (born 1966)
- Merle Oberon (1911–1979)
- Tina O'Brien (born 1983)
- Jack O'Connell (born 1990)
- Brenock O'Connor (born 2000)
- Josh O'Connor (born 1990)
- Sophie Okonedo (born 1969)
- Kate O'Mara (1939–2014)
- Gary Oldman (born 1958)
- Sir Laurence Olivier (1907–1989)
- Vivian Oparah (born 1966)
- Steve Oram (born 1973)
- Julia Ormond (born 1965)
- Tamzin Outhwaite (born 1970)
- Julian Ovenden (born 1976)
- Clive Owen (born 1964)
- David Oxley (1920–1985)

=== P-R ===
- Regé-Jean Page (born 1988)
- Alfred Paget (1879–1919)
- Patsy Palmer (born 1972)
- Archie Panjabi (born 1972)
- Ray Panthaki (born 1979)
- Lucy Pargeter (born 1977)
- Sarah Parish (born 1968)
- Cecil Parker (1897–1971)
- Nico Parker (born 2004)
- Robin Parkinson (1929–2022)
- Rachel Parris (born 1984)
- Diane Parish (born 1969)
- Louis Partridge (born 2003)
- Dev Patel (born 1990)
- Himesh Patel (born 1990)
- Robert Pattinson (born 1986)
- Maxine Peake (born 1974)
- Lennard Pearce (1915–1984)
- Julie Peasgood (born 1956)
- Simon Pegg (born 1970)
- James Pellow (born 1955)
- Steve Pemberton (born 1967)
- Alistair Petrie (born 1970)
- Sean Pertwee (born 1964)
- Alex Pettyfer (born 1990)
- Jon Pertwee (1919–1996)
- Nick Pickard (born 1975)
- Tim Pigott-Smith (1946–2017)
- Rosamund Pike (born 1979)
- Billie Piper (born 1982)
- Arthur Playfair (1869–1918)
- Donald Pleasence (1919–1995)
- Jessica Plummer (born 1992)
- Anna Popplewell (born 1988)
- Jorgie Porter (born 1987)
- Will Poulter (born 1993)
- Bel Powley (born 1992)
- Kathryn Prescott (born 1991)
- Megan Prescott (born 1991)
- Dominique Provost-Chalkley (born 1990)
- Florence Pugh (born 1996)
- Lucy Punch (born 1977)
- Kay Purcell (1963–2020)
- James Purefoy (born 1964)
- Ella Purnell (born 1996)
- Maiya Quansah-Breed (born 1997)
- Caroline Quentin (born 1960)
- Joseph Quinn (born 1994)
- Pauline Quirke (born 1959)
- Daniel Radcliffe (born 1989)
- Ronald Radd (1929–1976)
- Bella Ramsey (born 2003)
- Adil Ray OBE (born 1974)
- Jemma Redgrave (born 1965)
- Eddie Redmayne (born 1982)
- Oliver Reed (1938–1999)
- Toby Regbo (born 1991)
- Beryl Reid (1919–1996)
- Archie Renaux (born 1997)
- Lillian Rich (1900–1954)
- Dakota Blue Richards (born 1994)
- Joely Richardson (born 1965)
- Kieron Richardson (born 1986)
- Miranda Richardson (born 1958)
- Natasha Richardson (1963–2009)
- Sir Ralph Richardson (1902–1983)
- Shane Richie (born 1964)
- Alan Rickman (1946–2016)
- Daisy Ridley (born 1992)
- Lisa Riley (born 1976)
- Elisabeth Risdon (1887–1958)
- Michael Ripper (1913–2000)
- William Roache MBE (born 1932)
- Amy Robbins (born 1971)
- John Robinson (1908–1979)
- Patrick Robinson (born 1963)
- Vinette Robinson (born 1981)
- Zuleikha Robinson (born 1977)
- Paul Rogers (1917–2013)
- Stewart Rome (1886–1965)
- Tim Roth (born 1958)
- Dame Patricia Routledge (1929–2025)
- Fanny Rowe (1913–1988)
- Sophie Rundle (born 1988)
- William Russell (1924–2024)
- Dame Margaret Rutherford (1892–1972)
- Michelle Ryan (born 1984)
- Rebecca Ryan (born 1991)
- Mark Rylance (born 1960)

=== S-Z ===
- Hugh Sachs (born 1964)
- Colin Salmon (born 1961)
- Emma Samms (born 1960)
- George Sanders (1906–1972)
- Peter Sandys-Clarke (born 1981)
- Joan Sanderson (1912–1992)
- Jennifer Saunders (born 1958)
- Julia Sawalha (born 1968)
- Joanna Scanlan (born 1961)
- Adrian Scarborough (born 1968)
- Kaya Scodelario (born 1992)
- Naomi Scott (born 1993)
- Terry Scott (1927–1994)
- Kristin Scott Thomas (born 1960)
- Terry Scully (1932–2001)
- Peter Sellers (1925–1980)
- Andy Serkis (born 1964)
- Rufus Sewell (born 1967)
- Athene Seyler (1889–1990)
- Jane Seymour (born 1951)
- Anna Shaffer (born 1992)
- Martin Shaw (born 1945)
- Robert Shaw (1927–1978)
- Susan Shaw (1929–1978)
- Jack P. Shepherd (born 1988)
- Reece Shearsmith (born 1969)
- Nicollette Sheridan (born 1963)
- John Simm (born 1970)
- Sir Donald Sinden (1923–2014)
- Elisabeth Sladen (1946–2011)
- Tony Slattery (1959–2025)
- Lauren Socha (born 1990)
- Liz Smith (1921–2016)
- Dame Maggie Smith (1934–2024)
- Matt Smith (born 1982)
- Sheridan Smith (born 1981)
- Timothy Spall (born 1957)
- June Spencer (1919–2024)
- Samantha Spiro (born 1968)
- Terence Stamp (1938–2025)
- Joan Standing (1903–1979)
- Wyndham Standing (1880–1963)
- Imelda Staunton (born 1956)
- Shirley Stelfox (1941–2015)
- Dan Stevens (born 1982)
- Rachel Stevens (born 1978)
- Ronnie Stevens (1925–2006)
- Juliet Stevenson (born 1956)
- Patrick Stewart (1940–2026)
- Freddie Stroma (born 1987)
- Una Stubbs (1937–2021)
- Trudie Styler (born 1954)
- Terry Sue-Patt (1964–2015)
- Claire Sweeney (born 1971)
- Connor Swindells (born 1996)
- Tilda Swinton (born 1960)
- Meera Syal (born 1961)
- Sydney Tafler (1916–1979)
- Mary Tamm (1950–2012)
- Catherine Tate (born 1969)
- Gillian Taylforth (born 1955)
- Alma Taylor (1895–1974)
- Dame Elizabeth Taylor (1932–2011)
- Georgia Taylor (born 1980)
- Juno Temple (born 1989)
- Ellen Terry (1847–1928)
- Rakhee Thakrar (born 1984)
- Heather Thatcher (1896–1987)
- John Thaw (1942–2002)
- Joe Thomas (born 1983)
- Kristin Scott Thomas (born 1960)
- Emma Thompson (born 1959)
- Sophie Thompson (born 1962)
- Harriet Thorpe (born 1957)
- David Threlfall (born 1953)
- Will Tilston (born 2007)
- David Tomlinson (1917–2000)
- Eleanor Tomlinson (born 1992)
- Sybil Thorndike (1882–1976)
- Kraig Thornber (born 1961)
- Pip Torrens (born 1960)
- Patrick Troughton (1920–1987)
- Ralph Truman (1900–1977)
- Callum Turner (born 1990)
- Sophie Turner (born 1996)
- Jodie Turner-Smith (born 1986)
- Dorothy Tutin (1930–2001)
- Rupert Vansittart (born 1958)
- Norma Varden (1898–1989)
- Indira Varma (born 1973)
- Reg Varney (1916–2008)
- Manjinder Virk (born 1975)
- Charles Venn (born 1973)
- Hannah Waddingham (born 1974)
- Polly Walker (born 1966)
- Jessie Wallace (born 1971)
- Bradley Walsh (born 1960)
- Kay Walsh (1911–2005)
- Harriet Walter (born 1950)
- Melissa Walton (born 1990)
- Lalla Ward (born 1951)
- Suki Waterhouse (born 1992)
- Emma Watson (born 1990)
- Naomi Watts (born 1968)
- Eileen Way (1911-1994)
- Rachel Weisz (born 1970)
- Dominic West (born 1969)
- Lydia West (born 1993)
- Danniella Westbrook (born 1973)
- Gemma Whelan (born 1988)
- Chrissie White (1895–1989)
- Fionn Whitehead (born 1997)
- Josh Whitehouse (born 1990)
- Billie Whitelaw (1932–2014)
- June Whitfield (1925–2018)
- Jodie Whittaker (born 1982)
- Ricky Whittle (born 1981)
- Andy Whyment (born 1981)
- Jack Wild (1952–2006)
- Gabriella Wilde (born 1989)
- Michael Wilding (1912–1979)
- Tom Wilkinson (1948–2023)
- Maisie Williams (born 1997)
- Olivia Williams (born 1968)
- Ruth Wilson (born 1983)
- Penelope Wilton (born 1946)
- Anna Wilson-Jones (born 1970)
- Barbara Windsor (1937–2020)
- Kate Winslet (born 1975)
- Jaime Winstone (born 1985)
- Ray Winstone (born 1957)
- Norman Wisdom (1915–2010)
- Greg Wise (born 1966)
- Jack Wolfe (born 1995)
- Sir Donald Wolfit (1902–1968)
- Benedict Wong (born 1971)
- Emily Woof (born 1967)
- Aimee Lou Wood (born 1994)
- Jake Wood (born 1962)
- Victoria Wood (1953–2016)
- Katherine Woodville (1948–2013)
- Helen Worth (born 1951)
- Gillian Wright (born 1959)
- Bonnie Wright (born 1991)
- Margaret Wycherly (1881–1949)
- Archie Yates (born 2009)
- Reggie Yates (born 1983)
- David Yip (born 1951)
- Tom York (born 1992)
- Kit Young (born 1994)
- Rupert Young (born 1978)
- Assad Zaman (born 1990)
- Benjamin Zephaniah (1958–2023)
- Milly Zero (born 1999)

== See also ==
- Category:English actors
