= Abra-Cadaver =

Abra-Cadaver, Abra Cadaver, or Abracadaver may refer to:

== Literary works ==
- Abracadaver (Lovesey novel), a 1972 Sergeant Cribb novel by Peter Lovesey
- Abra Cadaver (novel), a 1999 crime novel by the American writer James N. Tucker
- Abra Cadaver, a supporting character from The Wizard of Id comic strip

== Music ==
- "Abracadaver", a song from the 1972 Bloodrock album Bloodrock U.S.A.
- "Abracadaver", a song from the 2002 The Lawrence Arms album Apathy and Exhaustion
- "Abra Cadaver", a song from the 2004 The Hives album Tyrannosaurus Hives

== Television ==
- "Abracadaver", a 1980 series one episode of the TV series Cribb
- "Abra Cadaver", a 1991 season three episode of the TV series Tales from the Crypt
- "Boogie Frights / Abracadaver", a 1998 season one episode of the TV series The Powerpuff Girls
- "Abra-Cadaver", a 2002 season three episode of the TV series CSI: Crime Scene Investigation
- "Abra Cadaver", a 2015 season two episode of the TV series iZombie
