= Wobble to Death =

1970 novel

- Author: Peter Lovesey
- Language: English
- Series: Sergeant Cribb
- Genre: Detective
- Publisher: Macmillan
- Publication date: 1970
- Publication place: United Kingdom
- Media type: Print
- Followed by: The Detective Wore Silk Drawers

Wobble to Death is a 1970 historical detective novel by the British writer Peter Lovesey. It was the first of a series of eight novels featuring the Victorian era policeman Sergeant Daniel Cribb, a member of the Metropolitan Police. It was published in Britain by Macmillan and in America by Dodd, Mead & Co. it received positive reviews from critics. The plot revolves around a walking marathon in 1879 in which several of the participants are murdered.

== Adaptation ==
In 1980 it was adapted as an episode in the first series of the ITV television show Cribb starring Alan Dobie and William Simons.

== Bibliography ==
- Herbert, Rosemary. Whodunit?: A Who's Who in Crime & Mystery Writing. Oxford University Press, 2003.
- Hubin, Allen J. Crime Fiction, 1749-1980: A Comprehensive Bibliography. Garland Publishing, 1984.
- Murphy, Bruce F. The Encyclopedia of Murder and Mystery. Springer, 1999.
- Reilly, John M. Twentieth Century Crime & Mystery Writers. Springer, 2015.
