= June Wyndham Davies =

British television producer and director (1929–2026)

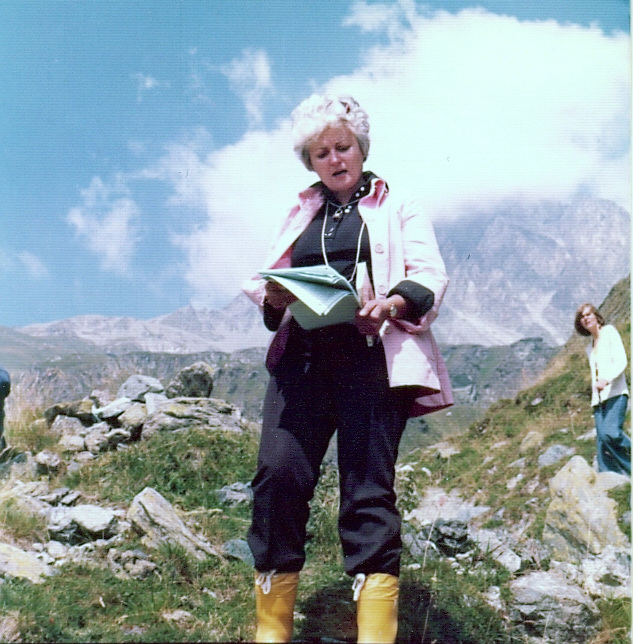
Wyndham Davies on location in Switzerland for BBC's 1974 production of Heidi

June Wyndham Davies (27 June 1929 – 9 September 2026) was a British television producer and director. For her work as co-producer (with Pippa Cross) of the film August, starring and directed by Anthony Hopkins, she won the BAFTA Wales award for Best Drama in 1997. She was also a writer, having written several short stories and plays, including Green Shutters.

== Life and career ==
June Wyndham Davies was born in Cardiff, Wales, on 27 June 1929 to Mervyn and Despina Wyndham Davies of Llandaff. Her father served as an officer in World War II and her mother, eldest daughter of the engineer and inventor James Wyndham, had been a ballet dancer. She attended Elm Tree House convent before moving to London to train at the Royal Academy of Dramatic Art, thereafter working for several years as an actress.

She entered the television industry as a BBC director in 1965 when most television drama was made almost as-live in the studio. Wyndham Davies directed 30 Minute Theatre, Sunday Afternoon Theatre and Out of Town Theatre, as well as single plays such as The House Mouse, Why Me? The Heart Grows Cold and The Lariat. She also devised, wrote and directed the six-part documentary series Why Would You Believe It? which was based on the idea of truth often being stranger than fiction.

Going freelance in 1969, Wyndham Davies continued her career with several TV companies – among them the BBC, Anglia, Granada and Yorkshire – directing Boy Meets Girl, Love Story, The Dolly Spike, The Folly and Don't Shoot the Cook. She also moved into directing episodes for long-running television series and serials, including Coronation Street, Castle Haven, Kate and Crown Court, together with television adaptations of children's classics such as Pollyanna (starring Elaine Stritch) and Johanna Spyri's Heidi (featuring Flora Robson and Kathleen Byron), which received a 1975 Emmy nomination in the United States for best television serial. From 1976 onwards, Wyndham Davies worked almost exclusively for Granada Television, producing dark and thought-provoking dramas, often dealing with the supernatural (for example, the Shades of Darkness series), as well as Victorian crime themes as in the Cribb series with Alan Dobie in the title role.

With a knack for spotting talent, Wyndham Davies gave the young Michael Caine his first chance in theatre, along with providing early opportunities for Rhys Ifans, Keeley Hawes and Hugh Grant. Her inspired casting ideas whilst working for the Drama Department at Granada included suggesting Jeremy Brett for the title role in The Adventures of Sherlock Holmes. Wyndham Davies went on to produce the second series, The Return of Sherlock Holmes, as well as The Memoirs of Sherlock Holmes in 1994 and several feature-length television films, including Sherlock Holmes – The Sign of Four.

Wyndham Davies died in Spain on 9 September 2026 aged 97.

== Awards ==
- BAFTA Cymru – Best Drama:‘August’ 1997
- Chicago International Film Festival – Silver Plaque: ‘The Lady’s Maid’s Bell’ (Shades of Darkness) 1985

== Selected filmography ==
=== Producer ===
- Send in the Girls
- The Adventures of Sherlock Holmes
- Cribb

=== Director ===
- Crown Court
- Heidi
- Pollyanna

=== Actress ===
- 1963–1964 – Compact (TV series) – Radiographer / Mrs. Stenton
- 1964 – On, Comet! On, Cupid! On, Donner and Blitzen! – Mrs.Stenton
- 1963 – Shock Tactics – Radiographer
- 1963 – On the Edge – Radiographer
- 1964 – Curtain of Fear (TV Series) – Secretary
- 1964 – The Linton Compact – Secretary
- 1958 – Saturday Playhouse (TV Series) – Secretary to Mrs. Wentross
- 1958 – Trespass – Secretary to Mrs. Wentross

=== Director ===
1986 – Shades of Darkness (TV series) (1 episode)

- Agatha Christie's The Last Seance

1980–1981 – Cribb (TV series) (3 episodes)

- Mad Hatter's Holiday (1981)
- Swing, Swing Together (1980)
- Waxwork (1980)

1981 – Christmas Spirits (TV Movie)

1979 – Screenplay (TV Series)

1973–1977 – Crown Court (TV series) (7 episodes)

- One for the Road: Part 1 (1977)
- The Personator: Part 1 (1975)
- A Case of Murder: Part 1 (1974)
- Traffic Warden's Daughter: Part 1 (1974)
- A Message to Ireland: Part 3 (1973)

1975–1976 – Coronation Street (TV Series)

- Episode #1.1655 (1976)
- Episode #1.1481 (1975)

1974 – Heidi (TV Mini-Series) (6 episodes)

1973 – Pollyanna (TV mini-series) (6 episodes)

1970–1972 – Kate (TV series)

- Back to Square One (1972)
- A Nice Rest (1972)
- Accidents Will Happen (1972)
- The Woman Behind the Man (1972)
- I Belong to Somebody (1972)

1969 – Who-Dun-It (TV series) (1 episode)

- Don't Shoot the Cook

1967 – Boy Meets Girl (TV series) (1 episode)

- Love with a Few Hairs

=== Producer ===
1998 – The Cater Street Hangman (TV Movie)

1996 – August (film)

1994 – The Memoirs of Sherlock Holmes (TV mini-series) (6 episodes)

- The Cardboard Box (1994)
- The Mazarin Stone (1994)
- The Red Circle (1994)
- The Golden Pince-Nez (1994)
- The Dying Detective (1994)

•The Three Gables (1994)

- 1992–1993 – The Case-Book of Sherlock Holmes (TV mini-series) (producer – 3 episodes)
- The Eligible Bachelor (1993)
- The Last Vampyre (1993)
- The Master Blackmailer (1992)

1990 – Made in Heaven (TV series) (producer – 4 episodes)

- A Fair Mix Up
- The Big Match
- Falling for Love
- Best of Enemies

1989 – The Heat of the Day (TV movie)

1988 – The Hound of the Baskervilles (TV movie)

1986–1988 – The Return of Sherlock Holmes (TV mini-series)

- The Bruce Partington Plans (1988)
- Wisteria Lodge (1988)
- Silver Blaze (1988)
- The Devil's Foot (1988)
- The Six Napoleons (1986)

1987 – The Sign of Four (TV movie)

1987 – The Death of the Heart (TV movie)

1983–1986 – Shades of Darkness (TV series) (producer – 9 episodes)

- Agatha Christie's The Last Seance (1986) (starring Jeanne Moreau)
- The Demon Lover (1986)
- Bewitched (1983)
- Seaton's Aunt (1983)
- The Maze (1983)

1981 – The Member for Chelsea (TV series)

- Episode #1.3
- Episode #1.2
- Episode #1.1

1980–1981 – Cribb (TV series) (producer – 14 episodes)

- Invitation to a Dynamite Party
- Murder Old Boy? (1981)
- The Choir That Wouldn't Sing (1981)
- The Hand That Rocks the Cradle (1981)
- The Last Trumpet (1981)

1981 – Christmas Spirits (TV movie)

1978 – Send in the Girls (TV series) (producer – 7 episodes)

- Goosepimples (1978)
- Chickabiddy (1978)
- Beware the Gentle People (1978)
- Away All Boats (1978)
- A Hardy Breed of Girl (1978)

1966 – Out of Town Theatre (TV mini-series) (producer – 1 episode)

- Why Me? (1966)
