= Peter Lovesey =

British writer (1936–2025)

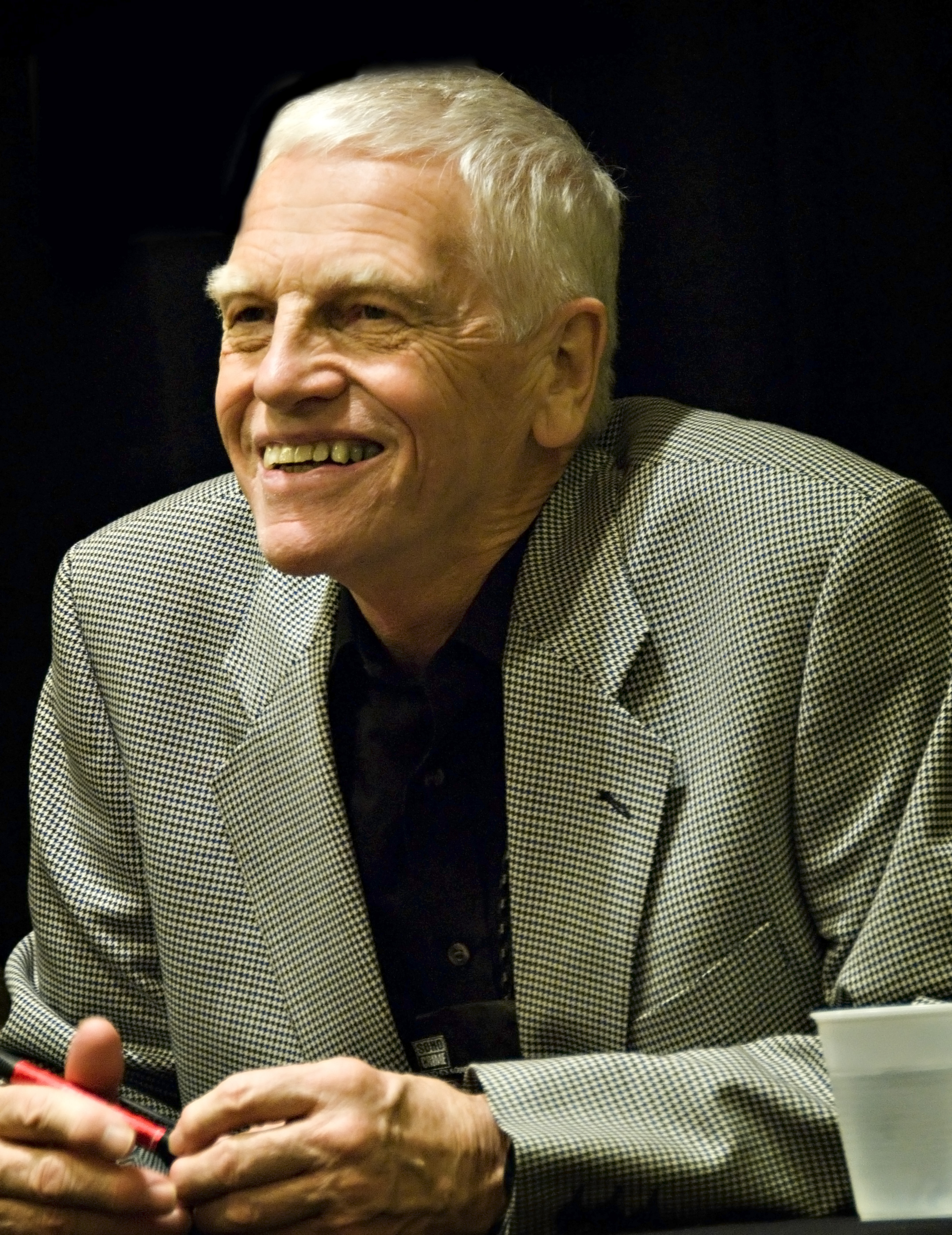
- Peter Lovesey in 2009
- Born: 10 September 1936; Whitton, Middlesex, England
- Died: 10 April 2025 (aged 88); Shrewsbury, Shropshire, England
- Occupation: Novelist
- Writing career
- Pen name: Peter Lear
- Genres: Detective fiction, Historical mystery
- Notable works: Sergeant Cribb series Peter Diamond series
- Notable awards: CWA Diamond Dagger; CWA Gold Dagger; CWA Silver Dagger
- Website: peterlovesey.com

Peter Harmer Lovesey (10 September 1936 – 10 April 2025), also known by his pen name Peter Lear, was a British writer of historical and contemporary detective novels and short stories. His best-known series characters are Sergeant Cribb, a Victorian-era police detective based in London, and Peter Diamond, a modern-day police detective in Bath. He was also one of the world's leading track and field statisticians.

== Early life ==
Lovesey was born in Whitton, Middlesex, England, on 10 September 1936, and attended Hampton Grammar School. He went to Reading University in 1955 but since he did not have the requisite Latin qualification to study English, he chose a degree in Fine Art which included History and English as elective subjects. Two of his English tutors, John Wain (1925–94) and Frank Kermode (1919–2010), thought well enough of Lovesey's essays to get him into the English course after all.

He graduated from Reading with an honours degree in 1958; he then did three years of National Service in the Royal Air Force. Signing up for the third year – National Service was ordinarily for two years – enabled him to train, and obtain better pay, as an Education Officer. When he left the Air Force it also gave him an edge in starting his teaching career. He married Jacqueline (Jax) Lewis, whom he had met at Reading, in 1959.

== Teaching and writing career ==
Lovesey's career in education lasted fourteen years. He started as a lecturer in English at Thurrock Technical College in Essex in 1961; he then became Head of the General Education Department at London's Hammersmith College for Further Education (now West London College). He quit teaching to become a full-time writer in 1975.

Lovesey wrote that he entered into writing detective fiction by way of his interest in British sports history. His first detective novel, Wobble to Death (1970), was set within a historically accurate depiction of a 19th-century foot race. Lovesey also authored non-fiction works on the history of British athletics. His first novel was followed by seven others in the Sergeant Cribb series set in Victorian England with the stories often placed in sports or entertainment events such as boxing, rowing, and music hall. After the Cribb series concluded, Lovesey continued with standalone and series mysteries, mostly set in various historical periods. From 1991, he switched to contemporary crime fiction with the Peter Diamond series set in modern-day Bath and consisting of twenty-two titles, with Against the Grain (2024) announced as the last in the series.

== Personal life and death ==
The Loveseys had two children, a daughter Kathy and a son Phil. Kathy was born in 1960, pursued a career in banking and lives with her family in Greenwich, Connecticut. Phil writes crime novels like his father. He was born in 1963 and worked as an English teacher at Wolverhampton Grammar School until 2012.

Lovesey died from pancreatic cancer at his home in Shrewsbury, on 10 April 2025, at the age of 88.

== Awards ==
Peter Lovesey won awards for his fiction, including Gold and Silver Daggers from the British Crime Writers' Association, the Cartier Diamond Dagger for Lifetime Achievement, the French Grand Prix de Littérature Policière and first place in the Mystery Writers of America's 50th Anniversary Short Story Contest. In 2016, the UK's Detection Club published Motives for Murder (US: Crippen & Landru, UK: Sphere) to recognise Lovesey's 80th birthday. In 2019, he was recognised by the Bouchercon Convention in Dallas for Lifetime Achievement.

== Adaptations ==
Some of the Sergeant Cribb novels were adapted into a Granada TV Series simply entitled Cribb (1979–81). The Series starred Alan Dobie as Cribb, with William Simons as Thackeray. The series is available on DVD in the UK, the US, and Canada.

BBC Radio's Saturday Night Theatre adapted six of the novels:

- Abracadaver (1975), with Frank Windsor as Cribb & John Hollis as Thackeray.
- Wobble to Death (1975), with Timothy Bateson as Cribb & William Eedle as Thackeray.
- The Detective Wore Silk Drawers (1977), with John Rye as Cribb & John Hollis as Thackeray.
- A Case of Spirits (1985), with Barry Foster as Cribb & John Cater as Thackeray.
- Swing, Swing Together (1987), with Barry Foster as Cribb & John Cater as Thackeray.
- Waxwork (1987), with Brian Cox as Cribb & John Cater as Thackeray.

== Published works ==
Lovesey's novels and stories mainly fall into the category of entertaining puzzlers in the "Golden Age" tradition of mystery writing.

Most of Peter Lovesey's writing was done under his own name. However, he did write three novels under the pen name Peter Lear.

=== Sergeant Cribb novels ===
Novels featuring Victorian-era detective Sergeant Daniel Cribb and his assistant Constable Thackeray.

- Wobble to Death (1970), ISBN 0-333-11069-2
- The Detective Wore Silk Drawers (1971), ISBN 0-333-12578-9
- Abracadaver (1972), ISBN 0-333-13591-1
- Mad Hatter's Holiday (1973), ISBN 0-333-14409-0
- Invitation to a Dynamite Party (1974), ISBN 0-333-15656-0 (published in the US as The Tick of Death)
- A Case of Spirits (1975), ISBN 0-333-18225-1
- Swing, Swing Together (1976), ISBN 0-333-19322-9
- Waxwork (1978), ISBN 0-333-23455-3 (Silver Dagger Award)

=== Peter Diamond novels ===
- The Last Detective (1991), ISBN 0-356-20264-X (Anthony Award)
- Diamond Solitaire (1992), ISBN 0-316-90325-6
- The Summons (1995), ISBN 0-316-91078-3 (Silver Dagger Award)
- Bloodhounds (1996), ISBN 0-316-87838-3 (Silver Dagger Award, Macavity Award, Barry Award)
- Upon a Dark Night (1997), ISBN 0-316-63971-0
- The Vault (1999), ISBN 0-316-64646-6
- Diamond Dust (2002), ISBN 0-316-85985-0
- The House Sitter (2003), ISBN 0-316-72531-5 (with Inspector Henrietta Mallin) (Macavity Award)
- The Secret Hangman (2007), ISBN 978-1-56947-457-0
- Skeleton Hill (2009), ISBN 978-1-84744-333-5
- Stagestruck (2011), ISBN 978-0-7515-4505-0
- Cop to Corpse (2012), ISBN 978-1-61695-078-1
- The Tooth Tattoo (2013), ISBN 978-1-61695-230-3
- The Stone Wife (2014), ISBN 978-1-61695-393-5
- Down Among the Dead Men (2015), ISBN 978-1-61695-626-4
- Another One Goes Tonight (2016), ISBN 978-0-75156-465-5
- Beau Death (2017), ISBN 978-1-61695-905-0
- Killing With Confetti (2019), ISBN 978-1641290593
- The Finisher (2020), ISBN 978-1641291811
- Diamond and the Eye (2021), ISBN 978-0751583670
- Showstopper (2022), ISBN 978-1641294706
- Against the Grain (2024), ISBN 978-1641296151

=== Albert Edward, Prince of Wales novels ===
- Bertie and the Tinman (1987), ISBN 0-370-31113-2
- Bertie and the Seven Bodies (1990), ISBN 0-7126-3471-1
- Bertie and the Crime of Passion (1993), ISBN 0-316-90685-9

=== Novels as Peter Lear ===
- Goldengirl (1977), ISBN 0-304-29848-4
- Spider Girl (1980), ISBN 0-670-66274-7 (republished as In Suspense)
- The Secret of Spandau (1986), ISBN 0-7181-2671-8

=== Other novels ===
- The False Inspector Dew (1982), ISBN 0-333-32748-9 (Gold Dagger Award)
- Keystone (1983), ISBN 0-333-35044-8
- Rough Cider (1986), ISBN 0-370-30740-2
- On the Edge (1989), ISBN 0-7126-2593-3 (adapted for television as Dead Gorgeous in 2002)
- The Reaper (2000), ISBN 0-316-85419-0
- The Circle (2005), ISBN 0-316-72945-0 (Inspector Hen Mallin, appearance by Peter Diamond)
- The Headhunters (2008), (Inspector Hen Mallin)

=== Short story collections ===
- Butchers (1985), ISBN 0-333-13364-1
- The Crime of Miss Oyster Brown (1994), ISBN 0-316-91253-0
- Do Not Exceed the Stated Dose (Crippen & Landru,1998), ISBN 978-1-885941-21-3
- The Sedgemoor Strangler (Crippen & Landru, 2001), ISBN 978-1-885941-64-0
- Murder on the Short List (Crippen & Landru, 2008), ISBN 978-1-932009-73-6
- "Showman" in Past Poisons (1998)

=== Anthology ===
- The Black Cabinet (1989), ISBN 0-947761-27-6 (ed.)
- The Verdict of Us All (2006), ISBN 978-1-932009-55-2 (ed.)

=== Non-fiction ===
- The Kings of Distance (1968)
- The Guide to British Track and Field Literature, 1275–1968 (1969), ISBN 0-902175-00-9 (with Tom McNab)
- The Official Centenary History of the Amateur Athletic Association (1979), ISBN 0-900424-95-8
- An Athletics Compendium (2001), ISBN 0-7123-1104-1 (with Tom McNab and Andrew Huxtable)
