= Carrie's War =

1973 children's novel by Nina Bawden

- Cover of first edition
- Author: Nina Bawden
- Illustrator: Faith Jaques
- Language: English
- Genre: Children's historical novel
- Publisher: Victor Gollancz Ltd
- Publication date: 1973
- Publication place: United Kingdom
- Media type: Print (Hardback & Paperback)
- Pages: 160 (first edition)
- ISBN: 978-0435122027
- Recommended reading age 7+.

Carrie's War is a 1973 English children's novel by Nina Bawden set during the Second World War. It follows two young London evacuees, Carrie and her younger brother Nick, into a Welsh village. It is often read in schools for its literary and historical interest. Carrie's War received the 1993 Phoenix Award and has been adapted for television.

== Plot ==
A frame story has Carrie visiting the town as a widow with her three, unnamed, children. She tells the children what happened thirty years before.

Carrie Willow and her younger brother Nick are evacuated to a rundown mining town in Wales during the Second World War. After an initial difficulty in finding a family to foster them, they stay with a shopkeeper, Mr Evans, who dominates his gentle but weak younger sister, whom they call "Auntie Lou". Another evacuee whom Carrie has befriended, Albert Sandwich, is staying at a dilapidated country house called Druid's Bottom with Mr Evans's older sister, the dying Mrs Dilys Gotobed, and her disabled cousin, Mr Johnny Gotobed. Their English housekeeper, Hepzibah Green, is reputed to be a wise woman. Carrie and Nick become friends with Albert and Johnny and spend a lot of time there. The housekeeper tells the children many tales, including one about a curse on Druid's Bottom, which will be activated if a mysterious skull is removed from the house.

It is revealed that Mr Evans has been estranged from his older sister, Mrs Gotobed, after she married a wealthy Englishman whose family owned the mines where their father was killed in an accident. Carrie is caught in the rift between the brother and sister. Despite almost universal contempt for Mr Evans, Carrie gives him a chance and sees that, beneath his rough exterior, he genuinely is a well-meaning man, who became embittered with the world due to his hard life and the feud with his older sister, to whom he was once very close. Hepzibah reveals to Carrie that Mr Evans resents that his sister came into wealth and privilege easily when she married, whereas he has had to struggle and work hard for everything he has.

When Mrs Willow comes to visit them, they say nothing about their dislike of Mr Evans, as they do not want to leave. Mrs Gotobed assures Hepzibah and Mr Johnny that they can continue to live in her house once she has died, and that she has made a will saying so. Carrie only meets Mrs Gotobed twice before she dies. Mrs Gotobed spends her days dressing in the beautiful ball gowns she used to wear when she was young. She asks Carrie to tell Mr Evans that she has never forgotten him, despite their feud. Carrie discovers that, despite Mr Evans's firm belief that Hepzibah is cheating Mrs Gotobed out of money, she is in fact penniless due to her and her late husband squandering their wealth on a lavish lifestyle.

On Carrie's birthday, Albert kisses her as a present and she is delighted. Auntie Lou, meanwhile, becomes friendly with Major Cass Harper, an American soldier, keeping this secret from her brother, who would not approve. When Mrs Gotobed dies, Albert is sure that Mr Evans has stolen her will so that he can turn Hepzibah and Mr Johnny out of his deceased sister's house, despite there being plenty of evidence that Mrs Gotobed had made no will – only mental deterioration (perhaps mild dementia) led her to believe she had made one. Johnny and Hepzibah will be homeless after a month's notice, as the house has become Mr Evans's property. Carrie does not want to believe this of Mr Evans, seeing him as an honest man. Albert, on the other hand, is convinced that Mr Evans has destroyed the will, and becomes even more adamant after he realises that a ring which Mr Evans gives Carrie as a present had in fact belonged to Mrs Gotobed.

However, Carrie changes her mind about Mr Evans after Albert vaguely recalls seeing an envelope in Mrs Gotobed's jewellery box that disappeared after Evans visited the house to take an inventory of his late sister's belongings. This envelope, Carrie believes, was Mrs Gotobed's will, and she too thinks Evans stole it to ensure he would inherit everything. To prevent this from happening, she throws the cursed skull into the horse pond. Mrs Willow arranges a new home for her family near Glasgow, and so the children prepare to leave, with mixed feelings. At the same time, Auntie Lou departs to marry Major Harper, leaving Evans alone. Carrie later learns that Evans is innocent after all: the envelope in fact contained nothing more than a childhood photograph of Evans and Mrs Gotobed, which she had left him. Evans bought the ring he gave Carrie as a present for Mrs Gotobed in their youth. As the children leave by train, they see that Druid's Bottom is on fire. Carrie is guilt-stricken, believing it is her fault for casting out the skull.

Thirty years later, Carrie's children discover that Hepzibah and Mr Johnny are living in a converted barn at Druid's Bottom, having escaped the fire, which was seemingly accidental. Mr Johnny's speech has improved considerably thanks to help from a speech therapist, a friend of Albert Sandwich. Albert, who also escaped the fire, still visits them every month, and is looking to buy and restore the ruined house for them to live in again one day. Auntie Lou, now Mrs Harper, lives in North Carolina with her husband, and they have at least one son. Evans, grieving and lonely, died long ago.

== Reception ==
Kirkus Reviews commended the author stating "Carrie's insight into the loneliness of an unsympathetic old man," before going to praise the novel stating that it was "a story of hushed suspense and emotional complexity."

== Awards and nominations ==
Carrie's War won the 1993 Phoenix Award from the Children's Literature Association as the best English-language children's book that did not receive a major contemporary award when it was originally published twenty years earlier. The award is named after the mythical bird phoenix, which is reborn from its ashes, to suggest the book's rise from obscurity.

== Film, TV or theatrical adaptations ==
Carrie's War has been adapted twice for television by the BBC, first in 1974, and then again in 2004. The original 1974 version starred Juliet Waley as Carrie, and Rosalie Crutchley as Hepzibah. The more recent 2004 BBC television film version (broadcast in America on PBS – Masterpiece Theatre in 2006) starred Keeley Fawcett as Carrie, Alun Armstrong as Mr Evans, Geraldine McEwan as Mrs Gotobed, Eddie Cooper as Albert Sandwich, Jamie Beddard as Johnny and Pauline Quirke as Hepzibah. The second remains available on DVD, distributed by Acorn Media UK.

A stage adaptation by Novel Theatre ran at Sadler's Wells in 2006–2007 and had a successful West End run starring Prunella Scales from June to September 2009, despite mixed reviews. One of them notes plot similarities with Gothic fiction and John Buchan's 1912 story "The Grove of Ashteroth".
