= Jamie Beddard =

British actor

Jamie Beddard (born 28 August 1966) is one of the United Kingdom's leading disabled theatre practitioners. He is a writer, actor, director and workshop leader as well as a trainer and consultant. At present Jamie is co-director of Diverse City, Lead Artist of Extraordinary Bodies, and an Associate Artist at the New Wolsey Theatre.

Previously Jamie has been Agent for Change at the New Wolsey Theatre, Diversity Officer at the Arts Council England, associate director of Graeae Theatre Company, and co-editor of DAIL magazine (Disability Arts in London). He achieved the honor of becoming a Clore Fellow and regularly writes and facilitates on leadership and diversity.

Jamie's past governance responsibilities and advising includes; the Independent Theatre Council, London Metropolitan University, the Football League and Transport for London, Arts Council England, Transport for London, Accentuate and London Metropolitan University. Jamie has contributed to print and web publications including The Guardian, BBC Ouch, Time Out, Disability Now and Access All Areas.

His present governance and advisory roles include Level Playing Field, Metal Culture, and Collective Encounters.

Beddard lives in North London with his partner Jo and children Llewelyn and Willow.

== Early life ==
Beddard attended Thomas Delarue School in Tonbridge, Kent, which, established by The National Spastics Society in 1955, was the first grammar school for disabled people. The Headmaster, Richard Tomlinson was a co-founder of Graeae Theatre Company, where Beddard would later work as an actor, writer, and director. Beddard was among the first disabled students to graduate from the University of Kent, with a degree in sociology. Beddard's grandfathers were both sportsmen; one being a fencer in the London Olympics and the other a Cambridge Blue. Beddard followed the Olympic tradition by directing 'Breathe/Battle of the Winds' for the Opening Ceremony (Sailing) of the London 2012 Olympic and Paralympic Games on Weymouth Beach.

== Career ==
Beddard is an established artist who entered into the disability arts world with no traditional performance training. In his own words, his career began "through a bizarre set of circumstances [when I] was jettisoned onto a film set, and a journey through the hinterlands of performance began." According to Jonathan Meth in the Guardian, seeing Beddard on a poster for Graeae Theatre Company's production of Ubu inspired Daryl Beeton, former artistic director of Kazzum Theatre, to enter the profession.

=== Writing ===
==== Plays ====
Beddard has written plays for Extraordinary Bodies, Graeae Theatre Company, Soho Theatre, Paines Plough and Writenet.

A number of these are referenced in Gary Owen's 'The Drowned World' and include:

- Waldo's Circus of Magic and Terror (co-writer with Hattie Naylor, National Tour, Extraordinary Bodies)
- Delicate (Theatre Royal Plymouth/Extraordinary Bodies)
- The Lodge (National Tour)
- Walking Among Sleepers (Jo Rawlinson & Caroline Parker)
- Perfect Wilderness (Paines Plough, Graeae Theatre Company)
- A Fading Light (Paines Plough, Graeae Theatre Company)
- Life Support (Writenet/Soho Theatre)

=== Directing ===
Beddard has held various Company positions and directed a range of cross-media productions.

He was associate director at Graeae Theatre Company (2005–2007) and at Diverse City (2008–2010). He was Guest Director for the Disabled Actors Theatre Company in 2011, and returned to Diverse City in 2012. He is Director of The Big Lounge Collective (2011 – present).

His productions include Fluff, Jackson's Lane (2004), The Last Freakshow, Fittings Multi-Media Arts (2005), The Trouble with Richard, Graeae Theatre Company (2005), The Drowned World, Edinburgh Traverse (2005), The Bigger Picture, Greenwich Theatre (2006), Pinocchio, Theatre Royal Stratford (2006), Reclaiming the Medical Model, Diverse City/Metropolitan University (2007), The Last Freakshow, Disabled Actors Theatre Company (2008), Didn't We Have a Lovely Time, Diverse City (2009), Can I Be Frank With You, Disabled Actors Theatre Company (2011) Splash, Diverse City (2019) Breathe (Battle of the Winds), Diverse City (2012), Delicate, (co-director) Extraordinary Bodies (2022), Green Spaces Dark Skies (Dartmoor co-director), Unboxed Festival/Film (2022), The Red Lion, (co-director) New Wolsey Theatre (2023)

=== Acting ===
==== Stage Work ====
Beddard's appearances on stage include; Joseph Merrick in The Elephant Man, dir by Lee Lyford at Bristol Old Vic, The Messiah in The Messiah, dir Tom Morris, at Bristol Old Vic, and Mathias in the Threepenny Opera (National Theatre) in 2016. This work was heralded as "a brilliant move" in a review by The Telegraph, which awarded the show three stars. Variety's review was equally mixed, though it praised Beddard's contribution: "Jamie Beddard, an actor with cerebral palsy, scor[es] with every punchline." His performance was also picked up on in the Financial Times: "Jamie Beddard plays the most astute of Macheath's lieutenants, largely from a wheelchair due to cerebral palsy, but makes every expletive ring through the Olivier." Beddard's appearance in the production was mentioned by Vikki Heyward in The Stage as indicative of "a new era of theatre, an era of acceptance and realisation that Deaf and disabled people should be – and can be – involved in a variety of shows" Mark Shenton in his review of the show, also in The Stage remarked: "It is also notable, because it's so rare, to see a wheelchair-using actor, Jamie Beddard, among the ensemble."

This came at a time when the National Theatre were starting to change its auditioning policy by responding to The Creative Case and opening its doors to disabled actors. As Disability Arts Online's Editor, Colin Hambrook observed in a review of the show: "aside from Nabil Shaban, Beddard is the only other wheelchair-using actor to tread the boards of the National Theatre in a pivotal role." Rufus Norris, artistic director at National Theatre who directed the production, has since reiterated his desire to work with Beddard again, telling The Stage: "Next time [I want to work with a disabled actor] I will think of Jamie, I won't think 'I need to find some disabled performers'".

Prior to becoming associate director at Graeae Theatre Company, Beddard had a number of acting roles with the company. These include the title role in Ubu (1994), and Christian in Fittings (2000). Beddard's portrayal of Corbaccio in Flesh Fly (1997) garnered commentary in literary criticism volumes about Ben Jonson's play. Marshall Botvinick described Graeae's production as 'possibly the most innovative staging [of the play] to date' and remarked: "Jamie Beddard, an actor with cerebral palsy played the part of Corbaccio, making it much harder for an audience to laugh at Corbaccio's many ailments". Beddard's portrayal was also singled out in Ben Jonson and Theatre: Performance, Practice and Theory for the way it confronted the prejudices of non-disabled audience members: "it was less easy for the able-bodied members of the audience to laugh...though the disabled members of the audience found [Beddard's] performance uproarious, as if they had earned the right to laugh. Here that factionalising of the audience which Jonson frequently promotes came forcefully alive to one's awareness, causing one to question the grounds on which one might laugh."

Beddard played the role of Mathieu in Traverse Theatre's 2007 production, 15 Seconds which was awarded three stars by The Guardian, with Mark Fisher highlighting Beddard's performance: "[Mathieu] is played by Jamie Beddard with a great forlorn frown, dreamy eyes and a deadpan black humour that cleverly undercuts our expectations of the character and the actor's disability."

His other theatre roles have included:

- Blake in Weighting, Extraordinary Bodies (2013)
- Estragon in Waiting for Godot, Tottering Bipeds (1998)
- The Dormouse in Alice in Wonderland, Nottingham Playhouse (1998)
- Voldov in The Bound Man, Battersea Arts Centre (1999)
- Francios in The Fly, Manchester Royal Exchange (2003)
- Quassimodo in The Kings of Fools, DASH (2006)
- Roger in Natural Diversions, Natural Theatre Company (2013)

Beddard has performed in Carrie's War twice, both times playing Mr Johnny at Apollo, Shaftsbury Avenue (2009), and for Novel Theatre (2011). The former was awarded four stars by The Telegraph, with Beddard described as providing "fine support".

==== TV and film ====
In the 1990s, Beddard played the lead Arthur in the BBC2 Screenplay Skalligrigg (1994) and Mike Bradley in ID for BBC Films (1995). He starred as Terry in Poland Productions' Trouble with Terry (1998) and played Gavin in BBC TV's production of Common as Muck (1999). In the same year Beddard played Rolandn Adams on the BBC made-for-TV film All the King's Men.

In the 2000s, he played the leading role of Man, in Channel 4's production of Access All Areas (2000), going on to play Nobby in Hartwood Films' Wonderful You (2001) and a few years later played Gobber in Quills for Carlton Films (2005). He played Johnny for BBC Wales' production of Carrie's War (2004), with The Movie Scene praising the "great casting". In 2002, Beddard played the leading role of Driver, this time for BBC1's The Egg.

He played Elvis for Beaconsfield Films' The Outcasts and Jamie for Turtle Canyon's Wheels, both in 2012.

Beddard starred alongside Jason Williamson from the Sleaford Mods in the 2017 short film, Lost Dog, which The Irish News described as "a tiny yet thought-provoking slice of life in 'austerity Britain'".

== Disability rights work ==
Beddard has been an outspoken advocate of rights for disability rights and for more disabled people to have roles within the creative industries. Beddard has commented, "I ain't broke, you don't need to fix me." This came as part of his focus group response for the 'Re-framing Disability' Exhibition in 2011, which looked at judgements and portrayal of historical representations of disabled people with comparisons to today. In an interview in 2016 with Disability Arts Online Beddard remarked:

"I'd like to see theatre become more inclusive. I love football and having relaxed performances makes theatre more like football. You should be able to go to theatre and engage with it. It is a scary time to be a disabled person, and so many of my contemporaries are desperately struggling, both, to work and survive. I feel a responsibility to the majority of disabled people who are finding life increasingly difficult, as Access to Work, the Independent Living Fund and care packages are savaged, and any gains we have made over last thirty years are consigned to history."

Beddard has also been critical of non-disabled actors playing disabled roles, writing in 2009 article for the Guardian:

"Unfortunately, some industry people still struggle with the idea that disabled actors may be best-placed to play disabled characters, and continue to represent disability through clouded prisms of metaphor and caricature. Non-disabled actors boost their red carpet prospects by offensively replicating impairments, as if physical appearance alone is shorthand for capturing the essence and character of a disabled protagonist. If he can imitate impairment, give him an Oscar."
