= Peter Ashmore (director) =

British theatre director and actor

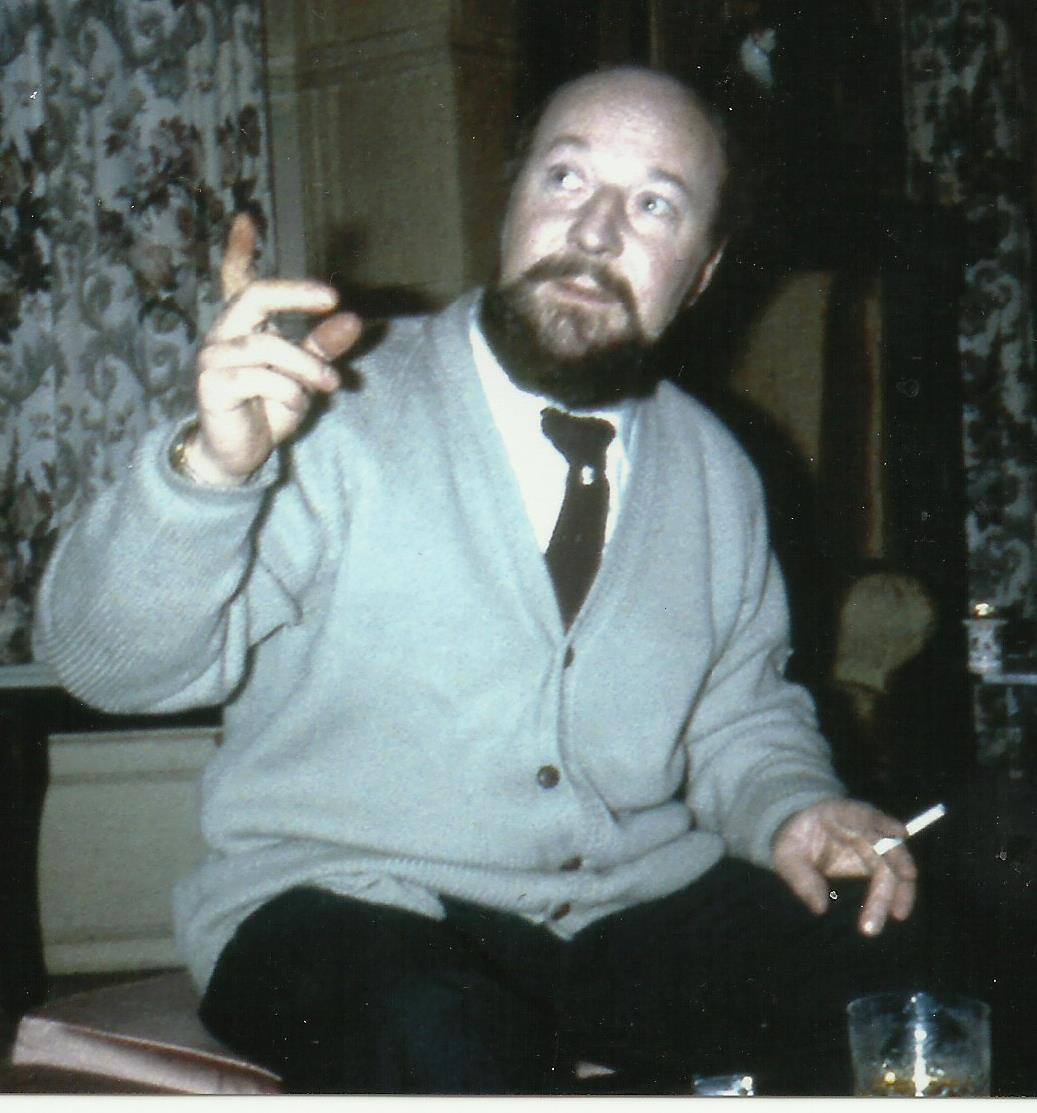
- Born: 29 January 1916; London
- Died: 26 July 1997 (aged 81); Cork, Ireland
- Education: St. Aloysius School, Archway London
- Occupations: Theatre director and actor
- Agent: Binkie Beaumont at HM Tennent Management
- Spouse: Rosalie Crutchley (m. 1946; dissolved 1959) Petra Gullstrand (m. 1963)
- Children: Jonathan and Catherine (by Rosalie Crutchley)

Peter Ashmore (born London 1916: died Cork, Ireland 1997) was a theatre director and actor. Between the years 1946 and 1956 Ashmore appeared as an actor and director in successful plays in London's West End and on Broadway. He drew from such players as Peggy Ashcroft, Alec Guinness, Wendy Hiller, Mai Zetterling, Robert Morley, Brenda Bruce, Frederick Valk, and Harcourt Williams.

== Life and career ==
Ashmore was the son of William Oliver Ashmore, undertaker, and his wife Marie Cavaliero. After attending The Central School of Speech and Drama, Swiss Cottage, Ashmore made his professional debut in 1934 in Windfall at the Embassy Theatre, London. He followed this by performing in Romeo and Juliet at Stratford-upon-Avon and featured in various productions at the Embassy, Phoenix, Mercury and Little theatres. He was a conscientious objector during the Second World War and made his reputation as a director at the Oxford Playhouse during the years 1941 and 1946. The actors in the company included Pamela Brown, Yvonne Mitchell, Isabel Dean and Rosalie Crutchley who was to become his wife. Noted productions during this period were Hedda Gabler with Pamela Brown and Uncle Vanya in which Ashmore played Vanya to Rosalie Crutchley's Sonia.

In 1946 Kitty Black, an agent working for Binkie Beaumont's H M Tennent theatrical management company, persuaded him to return to London, having been impressed with his directing at the Oxford Playhouse repertory theatre. He staged T.W. Robertson's play Caste at the Lyric Theatre, Hammersmith. Ashmore's first big commercial hit was in 1947 when he directed Robert Morley and Peggy Ashcroft in Edward, My Son at His Majesty's Theatre. The play was so successful that the production transferred to Broadway, New York. Then in 1949 it was made into a film produced by Metro-Goldwyn-Mayer, starring Spencer Tracy and Deborah Kerr.

From 1946 onwards and throughout the 1950s he worked continuously in London's West End, as well directing several plays on Broadway including the well received Legend of the Lovers ( from Jean Anouilh's Eurydice ) starring Richard Burton and Dorothy McGuire at the Plymouth Theatre, New York 1951 and the Master of Thornfield with Errol Flynn in 1958.

To Dorothy, a Son (1951), a farcical comedy by Roger McDougall starring Richard Attenborough and his wife Sheila Sim was another big success for Ashmore. It was made into a movie in 1954 starring Shelley Winters, John Gregson and Peggy Cummins.

The last play Ashmore directed was Mr Rhodes, a play about Cecil Rhodes (1961) starring Robert Morley but the play was a flop on tour and never reached the West End.

Ashmore decided to give up directing and lived on his boat for while in the South of France. Then he took his boat to Stockholm where he met the woman who was to be his second wife, Swedish school teacher Petra Gullstrand.

In the 1960s he returned to acting but only sporadically, appearing in various small parts in film ( Jigsaw 1962 ) and television ( Emergency Ward 10 ).

Ashmore's small part in The Saint TV crime series starring Roger Moore was to be his last appearance in film or TV. After his father's death in 1968, he inherited and sold his funeral business and decided to retire.

In the 1970s he lived mainly in Malta with his second wife Petra. Finally, they moved into a country mansion called Glenavon House in Fermoy, a village near Cork in Ireland and Ashmore remained there until his death in 1997.

Philip Purser, in his Guardian Obituary for Peter Ashmore, notes the sad coincidence that: "The actresses Rosalie Crutchley (obituary, July 31) and Isabel Dean (August 6) who had been friends since they were fellow members of Ashmore's Oxford Playhouse company during the war, died within 24 hours of each other. Ashmore, who was married to Crutchley for 13 years and father of her two children, had died one day earlier."

== Theatre ==
- 1934 Windfall - actor Embassy Theatre, London
- 1934 Aladdin - actor Embassy Theatre
- 1934 Romeo and Juliet - actor (playing "Gregory") Memorial Theatre, Stratford-upon-Avon
- 1935 Nothing ever Happens - actor Bournemouth
- 1938 Out She Goes - actor Richmond Theatre, London
- 1940 The Astonished Heart - actor Aberdeen
- 1941 Hedda Gabler - director Oxford Playhouse
- 1942 Uncle Vanya - director and actor Oxford Playhouse
- 1942 Quiet Wedding by Esther McCracken at the Mercury Theatre, Colchester, playing "Denys"
- 1944 Hamlet - director Playhouse Theatre, Liverpool
- 1944 Lisa - director Playhouse Theatre, Liverpool
- 1945 Pygmalion - director Playhouse Theatre, Liverpool
- 1946 Fear No More - director Bristol Old Vic
- 1946 Caste - director - Lyric Theatre, Hammersmith, London
- 1947 You Never Can Tell with Harcourt Williams - director - Wyndham's Theatre, London
- 1947 Edward, My Son - with Peggy Ashcroft and Robert Morley - director His Majesty's Theatre, London
- 1947 The Master Builder with Frederick Valk - director Arts Theatre
- 1948 Edward, My Son - transferred to Broadway, Martin Beck Theatre, New York
- 1948 You Never Can Yell - director Broadway, Martin Beck Theatre, New York
- 1949 Ann Veronica with Wendy Hiller - director Piccadilly Theatre, London
- 1950 The Fourposter with Dulcie Gray and Michael Denison - director Ambassador's Theatre, London
- 1950 Point of Departure by Jean Anouilh with Dirk Bogarde - London
- 1951 Figure of Fun with John Mills - Aldwych Theatre, London
- 1951 Three Sisters with Ralph Richardson and Celia Johnson - Aldwych Theatre, London BBC programme index
- 1951 The Human Touch with Alec Guinness - Savoy Theatre, London
- 1951 To Dorothy a Son with Richard Attenborough and Sheila Sim - Savoy Theatre, London
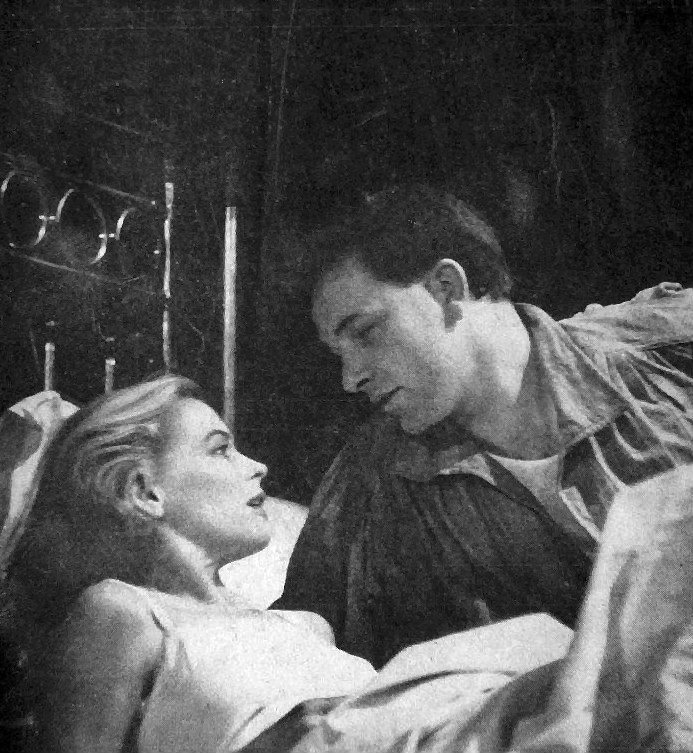
- Richard Burton with Dorothy McGuire in a scene from Legend of Lovers 1951 Plymouth theatre, New York, United States
  1951 Legend of Lovers adapted from Anouilh's Eurydice with Richard Burton, Plymouth Theatre New York
- 1952 Trelawny of the Wells - The Lyric Theatre, Hammersmith
- 1953 A Doll's House with Mai Zetterling and Sylvia Sims - The Lyric Hammersmith, London
- 1953 Night of the Fourth - Bournemouth Pavilion Theatre
- 1954 Hedda Gabler with Peggy Ashcroft and George Devine - Lyric, Hammersmith
- 1954 Hippo Dancing with Robert Morley - Lyric Theatre, London
- 1955 The Delegate - Opera House, Manchester
- 1956 A Likely Tale with Robert Morley and Margaret Rutherford - Globe Theatre BBC programme index
- 1958 The Master of Thornfield with Errol Flynn - New York
- 1961 Mr Rhodes with Robert Morley - this play did not make it to the West End.

== Filmography ==
- 1962 Jigsaw - Mr Bunnell (uncredited)
- 1963 Emergency Ward 10 ( TV series ) - Dr. Throssell (5 episodes)
- 1963 Lunch Hour - Lecturer
- 1964 Sergeant Cork ( TV series ) - Myers Abraham
- 1964 The Beauty Jungle - Lucius
- 1964 The Puzzle Lock - Luttrell
- 1964 Thorndyke ( TV Series )
- 1964 The Indian Tales of Rudyard Kipling - Mr Bent TV Series, "A Second-Rate Woman")
- 1965 Photo Finish - Reginald Kinsale ( Thursday Theatre TV Series )
- 1965 The Ipcress File - Sir Robert
- 1965 The Rise and Fall of Cesar Birotteau - Vauquelin (TV Series )
- 1966 Gordon of Khartoum - W.T.Stead ( BBC Play of the Month TV Series )
- 1966 The Lost Stradivarius - Dr. Empson ( Mystery and Imagination TV Series )
- 1967 Casino Royale - Barman
- 1968 The Saint - Finlay Hugoson ( TV Series )
