= Cribb =

British police drama television series (1979–1981)

- Genre: Mystery; Period drama
- Based on: Sergeant Cribb by Peter Lovesey
- Starring: Alan Dobie; William Simons; David Waller
- Country of origin: United Kingdom
- Original language: English
- No. of series: 2
- No. of episodes: 14

Production
- Running time: 60 minutes

Original release
- Network: ITV
- Release: 23 December 1979 – 10 May 1981

Cribb (Sergeant Cribb in North America) is a television police drama, which debuted in 1979 as a 90-minute made-for television film from Granada Television. Later, thirteen fifty-minute episodes were produced, which ran from 1980 to 1981.

Adapted from Peter Lovesey's Sergeant Cribb historical mystery novels and set in Victorian London around the time of the Jack the Ripper murders in 1888, Alan Dobie starred as the tough Detective Sergeant who worked for the newly formed Criminal Investigation Department (CID), determined to remove crime from the streets of London using the latest detection methods.

The series portrayed life in Victorian England, and the programmes included many real historical events such as the publication of Jerome K. Jerome's Three Men in a Boat and the sale of London Zoo's elephant Jumbo to Barnum and Bailey's Circus. The stories included issues such as bare-knuckle prize fighting, spiritualism and Irish terrorism. Assisting Cribb was Detective Constable Thackery, played by William Simons.

The 1979 pilot episode was entitled "Waxwork" and featured Carol Royle and Susie Blake and was produced and directed by June Wyndham-Davies.

== Main cast ==
- Alan Dobie as Sergeant Daniel Cribb
- William Simons as Constable Edward Thackeray
- David Waller as Inspector Jowett

== Episodes ==
=== Series 1 ===
No.	Title	Directed by	Written by	Original release date
1	"Waxwork"	June Wyndham-Davies	Peter Lovesey; Pauline Macaulay	23 December 1979
Pilot episode. Detective Sergeant Cribb is called in to investigate the case of a woman sentenced to hang for murder. Features Carol Royle, David Ashford, Gerald Sim, Laurence Payne, Bernard Archard and Roy Evans.
2	"Swing, Swing Together"	June Wyndham-Davies	Peter Lovesey; Brian Thompson	13 April 1980
After a young woman discovers a body floating in the River Thames, Cribb and Thackeray search for the killers—noting the similarities of the case to the recently published book Three Men in a Boat. Features Ronald Lacey, Heather James, Albert Welling, Jane How, Mark Burns, Sheila Keith, Robert Fyfe, Peter Birrel and Michael Ripper.
3	"Abracadaver"	Julian Amyes	Peter Lovesey; Bill MacIlwraith	20 April 1980
After a series of accidents to performers, Cribb and Thackeray enter the music hall scene where they uncover the existence of late-night secret performances for wealthy spectators. Features Patsy Rowlands, Julia Chambers, Chubby Oates, Ian Collier and Jerold Wells.
4	"The Detective Wore Silk Drawers"	Alan Grint	Peter Lovesey	27 April 1980
Rumours reach Cribb of a series of illegal prize fighting bouts taking place. Features Barry Andrews, Norma West, David Hargreaves, Mark Eden, Jimmy Gardner, Alf Joint, and Derek Ware.
5	"The Horizontal Witness"	Alan Grint	Peter Lovesey; Jacqueline Lovesey	4 May 1980
Cribb sends Thackeray undercover into hospital to protect a vital witness. Features John Ringham, Norman Jones, Jennifer Guy, Linda Robson, June Page, John Cannon and Steve Fletcher.
6	"Wobble to Death"	Gordon Flemyng	Peter Lovesey; Alan Plater	11 May 1980
The Pedestrian Championship of the World is taking place in London, and Cribb and Thackeray are on hand to prevent foul play between the various competitors. Features Andrew Burt, Archie Tew, Michael Elphick, Kenneth Cranham, Jeremy Young and Paul Barber.
7	"Something Old, Something New"	Oliver Horsbrugh	Peter Lovesey; Jacqueline Lovesey	18 May 1980
When Cribb accompanies Thackeray to the countryside for the wedding of an old friend of his father to a much younger woman, he soon begins to suspect that the intentions of the bride and her family are not entirely honourable. Features Charlotte Mitchell, Geoffrey Bayldon, Sally Osborne, Ivor Salter, Arthur Hewlett and George Waring.
8	"A Case of Spirits"	Bill Gilmour	Peter Lovesey; Arden Winch	25 May 1980
A leading spiritualist is killed at the home of his patron. Features Clive Swift, Judy Cornwell, Thorley Walters and Michael Barrington.

=== Series 2 ===
No.	Title	Directed by	Written by	Original release date
9	"Mad Hatter's Holiday"	June Wyndham-Davies	Peter Lovesey; Bill MacIlwraith	29 March 1981
After a severed hand is discovered, Cribb travels down to the seaside town of Brighton. His first task is to discover the identity of the victim with the assistance of an eccentric holiday-maker with a tale of a missing woman. Features Derek Fowlds, Fenella Fielding, Conrad Phillips and George Lee.
10	"The Last Trumpet"	Brian Mills	Peter Lovesey; Jacqueline Lovesey	5 April 1981
A popular campaign is being waged to prevent the sale of Jumbo, London Zoo's most popular attraction to America. When the elderly animal-lover organising the protests is murdered Cribb considers the various motives people had for killing her. Features Joyce Carey, Geoffrey Keen, Barry Jackson, Mary Larkin, Garrick Hagon and Tony Steedman.
11	"The Hand That Rocks the Cradle"	George Spenton-Foster	Peter Lovesey; Jacqueline Lovesey	12 April 1981
Inspector Jowett is very excited by the upcoming Golden Jubilee celebrations and is jealous when Cribb is selected by the Royal Household for a special mission—to investigate the background of the new nanny being selected for the Queen's Granddaughter. Features Rosalie Crutchley, Scott Fredericks, Sarah Neville, Aubrey Woods and Jane Sherwin.
12	"The Choir That Wouldn't Sing"	Mary McMurray	Peter Lovesey; Jacqueline Lovesey	19 April 1981
Cribb and Thackeray investigate the apparent suicide of a retired colonel, a member of a village choir. The detectives soon deduce that the Colonel's death was murder but their questions meet with a wall of silence from the local community. Features Elizabeth Spriggs, Barry McGinn, Ben Aris, Gilbert Wynne, David Jackson and Enn Reitel.
13	"Murder Old Boy?"	George Spenton-Foster	Peter Lovesey; Jacqueline Lovesey	3 May 1981
Inspector Jowett returns to his old school for a small reunion. His suspicions are raised by an appeal for funds by a fellow former student, who is subsequently murdered. Features John Carson, Terence Edmond, Petra Davies, Eric Dodson and John Bryans.
14	"Invitation to a Dynamite Party"	Alan Grint	Peter Lovesey; Arden Winch	10 May 1981
Cribb goes undercover to infiltrate the membership of the Irish Republican Brotherhood who are planning a major bombing. Features Jeananne Crowley and Charles Keating.

== DVD ==
Cribb is available on Region 2 DVD as a box set, distributed by Acorn Media UK. The series has been released in Region 1 by BFS Video.

== Radio dramatizations ==
Six of the stories from Series 1 have also been dramatized for radio by Geoffrey M Matthews as part of the BBC Saturday Night Theatre strand.

No.	Title	Producer/Director	Original release date
1	"Abracadaver"	David H. Godfrey	3 March 1973
Starring Frank Windsor, John Hollis, Helen Worth, William Eedle, Rolf Lefebre and Peter Bathurst
2	"Wobble to Death"	Harry Catlin	6 December 1975
Starring Timothy Bateson, William Eedle, Sydney Tafler, Trader Faulkner, Steve Hodson, Denis McCarthy and Rio Fanning.
3	"The Detective Wore Silk Drawers"	Graham Gauld	14 May 1977
Starring John Rye, John Hollis, Steve Hodson, Carole Boyd, William Eedle, Michael Goldie and Nicolette McKenzie.
4	"A Case of Spirits"	Peter Windows	31 August 1985
Starring Barry Foster, John Cater and David Garth.
5	"Swing Swing Together"	Vanessa Whitburn	4 July 1987
Starring Barry Foster, John Cater, Moir Leslie, Brian Hewlett, Roger Hume, Gordon Reid and Terry Molloy.
6	"Waxwork"	Vanessa Whitburn	3 October 1987
Starring Brian Cox, John Cater, Sarah Berger, Roger Hume, Don Henderson, Gordon Reid and Edwin Richfield.
