= Francis Storm Investigates =

Television series

- Genre: Thriller
- Written by: Peter Elliott Hayes
- Starring: Brian Worth; William Simons
- Country of origin: United Kingdom
- Original language: English
- No. of series: 1
- No. of episodes: 6 (all missing)

Production
- Producer: Jack Williams
- Running time: 60 minutes
- Production company: Associated-Rediffusion

Original release
- Network: ITV
- Release: 1 March – 5 April 1960

Francis Storm Investigates is a British television series that originally aired on ITV in 1960. A former SOE operative sets up as a private detective from his mews house in Kensington.

== Main cast ==
- Brian Worth as Francis Storm
- William Simons as Robin
- Sarah Long as Penelope Worth
- Robin Wentworth as Sgt. Pilcher

== Bibliography ==
- Pitts, Michael R. Famous Movie Detectives III. Scarecrow Press, 2004.
