= Carrie's War (TV serial) =

1974 British TV series

Carrie's War is an adaptation of Nina Bawden's book Carrie's War, broadcast from 28 January 1974 to 25 February 1974 on BBC1 in five 30-minute episodes.

== Plot ==
Set in Britain during World War Two, the story revolves around a girl, Carrie Willow, approximately ten years of age, and her slightly younger brother, Nick, who are sent to live in a rundown village in Wales from London during the Battle of Britain. They stay with a rural shopkeeper, Mr Samuel Evans, a fanatically religious harsh taskmaster, and his timid sister, Auntie Lou, whom Samuel dominates and bullies. Another evacuee child, Albert, lives at a nearby country mansion called Druid's Bottom, run by the oldest Evans sister, Mrs Dilys Gotobed, estranged from Mr Evans, penniless and terminally ill, along with her mentally disabled adult cousin Mr Johnny and housekeeper, Hepzibah Green. All the inhabitants of Druid's Bottom befriend Carrie and Nick.

Unlike an earlier British TV series, Tom Grattan's War, which also featured a child war evacuee, Carrie and her brother do not have any adventures with German spies or deserters, and there is no violence. Instead Carrie's War is a quiet, intimate story about the relationships between the characters and how they change over time. There is a vaguely supernatural theme as well, as Hepzibah is reputed to be wise woman and there is rumored to be a curse on Druid's Bottom.

During the course of the series, Auntie Lou weds an American soldier and leaves the village over Mr Evans's bitter objections. Mrs Gotobed dies and Mr Evans tries to claim her mansion and property and to evict Hepzibah and Mr Johnny after her will apparently disappears. Carrie and Nick are convinced that Mr Evans has stolen the will, and she retaliates by stealing an old skull which is believed to control a curse on Druid's Bottom, which then burns down, causing guilt to Carrie who has by then discovered that Mr Evans was in fact innocent - there was no will at all. The Willow children then go to live with family in Glasgow. There is an epilogue in which, thirty years later, the adult Carrie returns to the area with her (two) children to discover that Hepzibah and Mr Johnny, who survived the fire, are still living at Druid's Bottom, now owned by Albert Sandwich. Auntie Lou and her husband have lived in North Carolina since the end of the war. Mr Evans, alone and unhappy, died only a short time after Carrie and Nick left the village.

== Production ==
Shot by the BBC, the show was principally filmed on location in Blaengarw in rural Wales. Only a small amount of Welsh was spoken in the series: by Mr Evans saying Grace at the children's first meal in his house in Episode 1, and by the minister, Mr Morgan, officiating at Mrs Gotobed's funeral ("Ashes to ashes, dust to dust...") in Episode 4. The railway scenes in Episodes 1 and 5 were filmed on the Severn Valley Railway. The scenes for Druid's Bottom House were filmed at Bettiscombe Manor in Dorset. The scenes of the path through Druid's Bottom were filmed at woods in Rousdon, Devon. There were five half-hour episodes which were aired in January 1974. The cast of child actors would have few other credits. The series has been made available on DVD and is available to purchase online. It is referenced in the BBC documentary From Andy Pandy To Zebedee in 2015.

== Cast ==
- Juliet Waley as Carrie Willow
- Andrew Tinney as Nick Willow
- Aubrey Richards as Samuel Evans
- Avril Elgar as Lou Evans
- Rosalie Crutchley as Hepzibah Green
- Tim Coward as Albert Sandwich
- Matthew Guinness as Mr. Johnny Gotobed
- Sean Arnold as Frederick
- Patsy Smart as Dilys Gotobed
