= Tragic Wand =

2000 novel by James Tucker

- First edition
- Author: James Tucker
- Language: English
- Genre: Novel
- Publisher: Onyx
- Publication date: 2000
- Publication place: USA
- Media type: Print (Paperback)
- Pages: 416
- ISBN: 0-451-40946-9
- OCLC: 47744552
- Preceded by: Hocus Corpus

Tragic Wand is a crime novel by the American writer James N. Tucker set in 1990s Pittsburgh, Pennsylvania. It opens with the story of Assistant District Attorney Tory Welch being attacked at the office of plastic surgeon Marshall Cutter. Her friend, protagonist Dr. Jack Merlin, surgeon, part-time magician and sleuth, gets involved in the case.

== Sources ==
Contemporary Authors Online. The Gale Group, 2006. PEN (Permanent Entry Number): 0000142340.
