= Chips with Everything =

1962 play by Arnold Wesker

- Dust jacket 1st edition, Jonathan Cape, 1962
- Original language: English
- Written by: Arnold Wesker
- Genre: Drama

Premiere
- Date: 27 April 1962
- Place: Royal Court Theatre

Chips with Everything is a 1962 play by Arnold Wesker. The action takes place among a group of National Service airmen in post-war Britain. One of the recruits comes from an upper-middle class family and has a public school education, but refuses to conform to the stereotype with which others try to categorise him.

== Productions ==
Chips with Everything premiered in the West End at the Royal Court Theatre on 27 April 1962, and subsequently transferred to the Vaudeville Theatre. Directed by John Dexter, the cast featured Frank Finlay as Corporal Hill.

The play opened on Broadway at the Plymouth Theatre (and then the Booth Theatre) on 1 October 1963 after one preview, and closed on 8 February 1964 after 149 performances. British actors Alan Dobie (as Corporal Hill), Barry Evans (as First Airman) and George Layton (as First Corporal) made their Broadway debut. The director was John Dexter, with a cast that featured Gary Bond as 276 Thompson (Pip), Corin Redgrave (Pilot Officer), Norman Allen (Fourth Airman), John Levitt as 277 Cohen (Dodger), John Noakes and Gerald McNally (Third Airman).

The play was revived in the West End in 1997, with a production at the Royal National Theatre, Lyttelton Theatre, from 4 September 1997 to 13 December 1997. Directed by Howard Davies, the set was designed by Rob Howell, with a cast that featured Rupert Penry-Jones, Ian Dunn, Eddie Marsan, and James Hazeldine as Corporal Hill.

== Adaptations ==
The first television adaptation came in 1963, when scenes from the Royal Court Theatre production aired on BBCtv featuring Derek Fowlds, John Noakes, Ronald Lacey and Corin Redgrave. BBC television adapted the play for their daytime 'Schools and Colleges' programming in September 1969, dramatizing the play in six 35-minute episodes, having previously presented a radio adaptation starring Martin Jarvis in May 1968. In 1975, the play was presented on BBC1 as part of the Play of the Month strand, directed by Waris Hussein and produced by Cedric Messina, with David Daker heading the cast.

== Plot summary ==
The play examines the nature of class consciousness in post-war Britain. Pip Thompson has been "conscripted for National Service" in the Royal Air Force (RAF) but prefers to be treated as an ordinary airman and not become an officer. Pip is a socialist who has seen the "squalor of London's East End, typified by greasy cafés offering 'chips with everything'".

Pip is the only privately-educated recruit in a draft of other National Service recruits. He has tried to buck the system by not applying for an officer's commission. The officers, hostile to this socio-political protest, do everything they can to make him abandon his decision and to join them in the ranks of commissioned officers. Pip is essentially on an ego trip, but his experiences allow the class system to be examined and, in particular, how powerful forces make sure Pip conform to his role as a middle-class member of society and accept a role as a commissioned officer.

== Songs performed ==
- Cutty Wren
- Lyke-Wake Dirge
