= The Detective Wore Silk Drawers =

1971 novel

- Author: Peter Lovesey
- Language: English
- Series: Sergeant Cribb
- Genre: Detective
- Publisher: Macmillan
- Publication date: 1971
- Publication place: United Kingdom
- Media type: Print
- Preceded by: Wobble to Death
- Followed by: Abracadaver

The Detective Wore Silk Drawers is a 1971 historical detective novel by the British author Peter Lovesey. It was the second entry a series of eight novels featuring the Victorian era policeman Sergeant Daniel Cribb, a member of the Metropolitan Police. It is set against the backdrop of nineteenth century bare-knuckle boxing. In 1980 it was adapted into an episode of the same title for the ITV series Cribb.

== Bibliography ==
- Browne, Ray B. & Kreiser, Lawrence A. The Detective as Historian: History and Art in Historical Crime Fiction, Volume 1. Popular Press, 2000.
- Herbert, Rosemary. Whodunit?: A Who's Who in Crime & Mystery Writing. Oxford University Press, 2003.
- Hubin, Allen J. Crime Fiction, 1749–1980: A Comprehensive Bibliography. Garland Publishing, 1984.
- Murphy, Bruce F. The Encyclopaedia of Murder and Mystery. Springer, 1999.
- Priestman, Martin. The Cambridge Companion to Crime Fiction. Cambridge University Press, 2003.
- Reilly, John M. Twentieth Century Crime & Mystery Writers. Springer, 2015.
