= Danton (1970 film) =

- Written by: Arden Winch
- Directed by: John Howard Davies
- Starring: Anthony Hopkins
- Country of origin: United Kingdom
- Original language: English

Production
- Producer: Mark Shivas
- Running time: 85 min
- Production company: BBC Television

Original release
- Network: BBC Television
- Release: October 21, 1970

Danton is a 1970 BBC-TV television movie starring Anthony Hopkins. The film is a dramatization of events during the French Revolution.

== Plot summary ==
Anthony Hopkins stars as the charismatic revolutionary leader Georges Danton in conflict with Maximilien Robespierre, played by Alan Dobie. Also featured are Geoffrey Bayldon as Couthon, David Andrews as Saint-Just, and Mark Jones as Desmoulins.

== Cast ==
- Anthony Hopkins as Danton
- Alan Dobie as Robespierre
- Michael Robbins as Sanson
- Clifford Cox as Crony
- Tenniel Evans as Gen. Westermann
- Terry Scully as Fabre d'Eglantine
- John Quentin as Hérault de Seychelles
- Mark Jones as Camille Desmoulins

== Reception and reviews ==
With Hopkins' other television work of 1970, the film officially shares credit for his nomination as Best Actor at that year's British Academy of Film and Television Arts awards.
