= Hocus Corpus =

1999 novel by James Tucker

- First edition
- Author: James Tucker
- Language: English
- Genre: Novel
- Publisher: Onyx
- Publication date: 1999
- Publication place: USA
- Media type: Print (Paperback)
- Pages: 403
- ISBN: 0-451-40891-8
- OCLC: 41575834
- Preceded by: Abra Cadaver
- Followed by: Tragic Wand

Hocus Corpus is a crime novel by the American writer James N. Tucker set in 1990s Pittsburgh, Pennsylvania.

It tells the story of Dr. Jack Merlin, now chief resident of surgery, still a part-time magician and sleuth, who is mysteriously losing patients after routine surgery at the University of Pittsburgh Medical Center.

== Sources ==
Contemporary Authors Online. The Gale Group, 2006. PEN (Permanent Entry Number): 0000142340.
