= Hard Times (British TV series) =

- DVD cover
- Genre: Drama
- Created by: Arthur Hopcraft
- Starring: Patrick Allen; Rosalie Crutchley; Michelle Dibnah; Alan Dobie; Barbara Ewing; Edward Fox; Ursula Howells; Harry Markham; Jacqueline Tong; Timothy West; Richard Wren; Sean Flanagan; Peter Martin
- Theme music composer: Malcolm Arnold
- Countries of origin: United States; United Kingdom
- No. of episodes: 4

Production
- Producers: Peter Eckersley & Ronald F. Maxwell & Jac Venza
- Running time: 60 Minutes

Original release
- Network: Granada Television; WNET
- Release: 25 October – 15 November 1977

Hard Times is a 1977 television series based on Charles Dickens' 1854 novel of the same name, directed by John Irvin.

== Cast ==
- Patrick Allen – Thomas Gradgrind
- Rosalie Crutchley – Mrs. Sparsit
- Michelle Dibnah – Sissy Jupe
- Alan Dobie – Stephen Blackpool
- Barbara Ewing – Rachael
- Edward Fox – Capt. James Harthouse
- Ursula Howells – Mrs. Gradgrind
- Harry Markham – Sleary
- Jacqueline Tong – Louisa Gradgrind
- Timothy West – Josiah Bounderby
- Richard Wren – Tom Gradgrind
- Sean Flanagan – Bitzer
- Peter Martin – Waiter
- Tony Heath – Childers
- Michael Deeks – Kidderminster
- Paul Ridley – McChoakumchild
- Brenda Elder – Mrs Blackpool
- Patrick Durkin – Slackbridge
- The circus artists are credited as Augusto's Circus, The Medini, Tommy Mann and others

== Critical reception ==
Screenonline wrote "The four-part adaptation by Arthur Hopcraft is streamlined but generally very faithful to the book and, as directed by John Irvin, the serial is presented with considerable panache."

== Music ==
The title music is the 'Cavatina' second movement of Malcolm Arnold's Little Suite No. 2 for Brass band Op. 93 (1967), arranged and conducted by Marcus Dods.
