= Abracadaver (Lovesey novel) =

1972 novel

- Author: Peter Lovesey
- Language: English
- Series: Sergeant Cribb
- Genre: Detective
- Publisher: Macmillan
- Publication date: 1972
- Publication place: United Kingdom
- Media type: Print
- Preceded by: The Detective Wore Silk Drawers
- Followed by: Mad Hatter's Holiday

Abracadaver is a 1972 historical mystery detective novel by the British author Peter Lovesey. It is the third in his series featuring the Victorian era policeman Sergeant Daniel Cribb. Cribb, a member of the Metropolitan Police, investigates a crime that takes place in the world of London's music halls. The title is a portmanteau of the words abracadabra, a word frequently used in magic tricks, and cadaver, an alternative word for a corpse.

== Adaptation ==
In 1980 it was adapted into an episode of for the ITV series Cribb starring Alan Dobie as Cribb.

== Bibliography ==
- Browne, Ray B. & Kreiser, Lawrence A. The Detective as Historian: History and Art in Historical Crime Fiction, Volume 1. Popular Press, 2000.
- Hubin, Allen J. Crime Fiction, 1749-1980: A Comprehensive Bibliography. Garland Publishing, 1984.
- Murphy, Bruce F. The Encyclopaedia of Murder and Mystery. Springer, 1999.
- Reilly, John M. Twentieth Century Crime & Mystery Writers. Springer, 2015.
