= Who-Dun-It (TV series) =

British TV crime series (1969)

- Created by: Lewis Greifer
- Directed by: Ian Fordyce; James Ormerod; Peter Moffatt; Robert Tronson; June Wyndham-Davies
- Starring: Gary Raymond; Victor Platt; Amanda Reiss; Anthony Sagar
- Country of origin: United Kingdom
- Original language: English
- No. of series: 1
- No. of episodes: 13

Production
- Producer: Jack Williams
- Editor: Lewis Greifer
- Running time: 50 mins

Original release
- Network: ATV
- Release: 19 August – 11 November 1969

Who-Dun-It is a 1969 British television crime drama series. It was a series of 13 television plays where a detective tries to solve a murder and the audience is presented with the clues to give them a challenge to solve it themselves. The lead investigator, who also narrated the shows, changed back and forth during the series starting with Jeremy Moon (played by Gary Raymond), followed by Detective Inspector Trubshaw (Victor Platt), Cynthia Park (Amanda Reiss) and Inspector White (Anthony Sagar). The series aired on ATN 7 in Australia in 1971.

TV Times ran their own series of Who-dun-it articles alongside the TV series to get viewers "into training".

== Episodes ==
Episodes with investigator in brackets.

1. Death of a Hostess (Moon)
2. A Matter of Honour (Moon)
3. The Eyes of Buddha (Trubshaw)
4. The Fall of a Goddess (Moon)
5. An Embarrassment of Murder (Park)
6. A Little Charity (Trubshaw)
7. Death of a Cavalier (Moon)
8. Crime at the Panto (Park)
9. Murder Impossible (Park)
10. Don't Shoot the Cook (Moon)
11. Murder Goes to School (Park)
12. Death in a Seance (White)
13. A High Class Death (White)

== Reception ==
On the opening episode Patricia Smith in Southern Daily Echo began "WHAT a spiffing spoof it all was. There was a body (rich, beautiful and thoroughly nasty it had been too), a legion of suspects (all with justifiable motives for murder) and clues galore." She said it "managed to sustain our involvement in the blatantly unsubtle plot (we were invited —welcomed even— to play amateur detective) while it poked gentle fun at such dialogue as: "I hate her Michael," and "If there was another man, I'd ... I'd kill you."" Daily Record's John Pirie said the lead actor "indulged in quite a bit of ham acting but I suppose that was necessary in order to get the evidence to us as simply as possible, and underline it as well."
