= Robin Merrill =

English journalist

Robin Merrill (born 20th century) is an English actor, musician, presenter, producer and journalist.

He is a journalist for Deutsche Welle television.

== Biography ==
Born in Salisbury, Merrill won a scholarship at age thirteen to the musical academia at Repton School in Repton, Derbyshire. Merrill then attended London's Guildhall School of Music and Drama where he studied singing.

He has worked for German television channel Deutsche Welle as a presenter and journalist since 1994.

He was an actor in the 1967 movie Far from the Madding Crowd.

He and his wife Karola have two children.
