= Oliver Horsbrugh =

British television director (1937–2009)

Oliver Horsbrugh (1937 – August 2009) was a British television director most recently for Emmerdale. He also directed episodes of the top rated ITV1 soap opera, Coronation Street, from the early 1970s. He won a BAFTA as part of the Emmerdale team in 2001 when the programme was awarded the Best Soap Award.

Horsbrugh was born to a family of actors; Walter Horsbrugh and Sheila Beckett.

His early training was at the BBC.

His daughter Rebecca is a sports journalist with SNTV, the sports television arm of Associated Press TV.
