= Dan Cunningham =

British actor (1917–2001)

Dan Cunningham (1 January 1917 – September 2001) was a British actor who made few screen appearances but was a noted stage actor, performing at Eichstätt. He appeared in Laurence Olivier's Richard III (1955) as Lord Grey.

He was married to the actress Rosalie Crutchley in 1939, but the marriage ended in divorce.

== Filmography ==
Year	Title	Role	Notes
1950	The Wooden Horse	David	
1954	The Diamond	Diamond Laboratory Technician	Uncredited
1955	Richard III	The Lord Grey	
1956	The Last Man to Hang?	The Law: Clerk of the Court	
