= Abra Cadaver (novel) =

1999 novel by James Tucker

- First edition
- Author: James Tucker
- Language: English
- Publisher: Signet Books
- Publication date: 1999
- Publication place: United States
- Media type: Print
- Pages: 400
- ISBN: 978-0-739-40134-7
- OCLC: 40503009
- Followed by: Hocus Corpus

Abra Cadaver is a crime novel by the American writer James N. Tucker set in 1990s Pittsburgh, Pennsylvania.

It tells the story of Dr. Jack Merlin, full-time surgeon, part-time magician, and now sleuth, who discovers the body of an old classmate in the gross anatomy lab at the University of Pittsburgh Medical Center.

== Sources ==
Contemporary Authors Online. The Gale Group, 2006. PEN (Permanent Entry Number): 0000142340.
