= Richard Tomlinson (disambiguation) =

Richard Tomlinson (born 1963) is a New Zealand-born British former Secret Intelligence Service (MI6) officer.

Richard Tomlinson may also refer to:

- Richard Tomlinson (academic) (born 1932), British archaeologist
- Richard Tomlinson (MP), Member of Parliament (MP) for Weymouth and Melcombe Regis (1571)
- Richard H. Tomlinson (c. 1924–2018), Canadian chemist and philanthropist
- Dick Tomlinson (Richard Kent Tomlinson), American football player
- Walter Montgomery (actor) (Richard Tomlinson, 1827–1871), American-British actor

== See also ==
- Ricky Tomlinson (born 1939), British actor
- Rick Tomlinson, English musician
