= James Pellow =

- Born: 1955; Ryde, Isle of Wight, England
- Occupations: Actor, writer
- Years active: c. 1993–present
- Known for: Playing Lady Bracknell; one-man shows

James Pellow is a British actor and writer, known for his work in stage plays, particularly in repertory theatre and for his one-man shows. He is noted for his performances of female roles, most notably playing Lady Bracknell in Oscar Wilde's The Importance of Being Earnest on four separate occasions. Pellow is originally from the Isle of Wight, where he began his career.

== Early life and career beginnings ==
Pellow was born in 1955 in Ryde, Isle of Wight, England. Prior to his professional theatre career, he worked at the Packs department store in Ryde starting in 1975, initially in the Men's Department and later at the store's "The Coffee Bean" coffee shop.

He trained with The Actors' Company, London, after leaving his job at Packs and worked in regional theatre.

== Theatre career ==
Pellow has an extensive stage career spanning two decades, including numerous performances in repertory theatre and touring productions.

=== Lady Bracknell and one-man shows ===
Pellow is particularly known for his portrayal of the theatrical matriarch Lady Bracknell in The Importance of Being Earnest, a role he has performed four times, including at:

- The Jermyn Street Theatre, London (2007)
- The Cochrane Theatre, London
- The Manor Pavilion Theatre, Sidmouth
- A French tour

This pivotal role inspired one of his successful original one-man plays, Lady Bracknell's Legacy (originally titled The Gathering). The play features two retired theatricals, Devonia deRudge (a self-styled "Grande Dame" who frequently quotes her performance as Lady Bracknell) and Freddie Farnsworth. Pellow performs both characters, exploring themes of friendship, memory, and lost opportunities in a theatrical retirement home setting.

=== Repertory and pantomime ===
Pellow has maintained a long association with the Manor Pavilion Theatre in Sidmouth, Devon, where he is considered a perennial favourite of the Summer Play Festival, marking his 20th consecutive season in 2024. His work in repertory includes:

- Pardon Me, Prime Minister (Theatre Royal, Windsor)
- Bedroom Farce (Theatre Royal, Windsor)
- Amy's View (Theatre Royal, Windsor)
- The Marriage-Go-Round (Lyceum Theatre, Crewe)
- Worm's Eye View (Lyceum Theatre, Crewe)

He has also returned to Shanklin Theatre on the Isle of Wight multiple times to play the Dame in local pantomimes.

== Writing credits ==
As an author, Pellow has written several non-fiction and stage works:

- Lady Bracknell's Legacy (Stage Play, 2022)
- Pellow Talk (Stage Show)
- Just James (Stage Show)
- Sylvia, Little Peach in the White Sandals (Stage Play, 2024)
- A Lifetime on The Titanic: A Survivor's Biography (Book)
- Editor of 'Never the Same Girl Twice', the autobiography of music hall artiste Helga Stone

== Film and radio ==
Pellow's film credits include Waiting for a Stranger (2011) and The Locksmith (2011). For radio, he has narrated Berries and Mrs. Bulstrode and A Christmas Carol.
