= Rosalie Crutchley =

British actress (1920–1997)

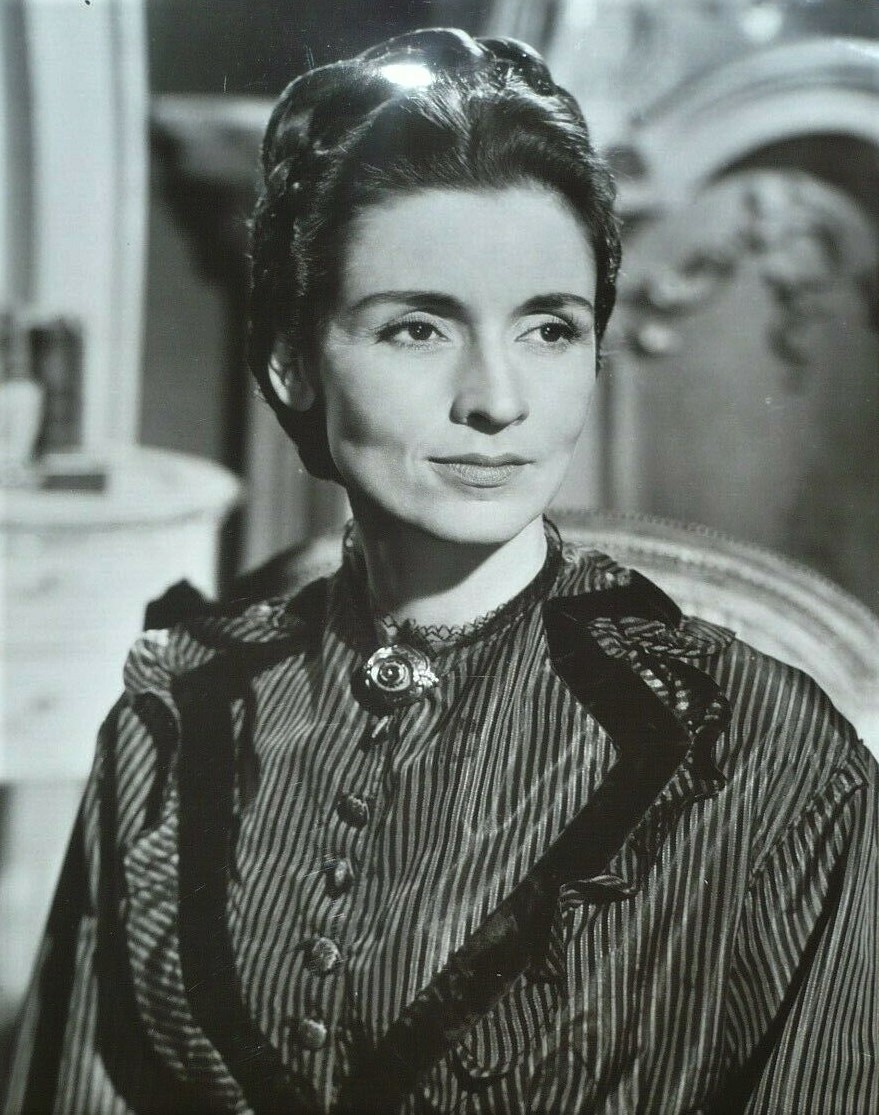
- Crutchley in Freud: The Secret Passion (1962)
- Born: Rosalie Sylvia Crutchley; 4 January 1920; London, England
- Died: 28 July 1997 (aged 77); Marylebone, London, England
- Occupation: Actress
- Years active: 1947–1997
- Spouse(s): Peter Ashmore (1946–?; divorced); Dan Cunningham (1939–?; divorced)
- Children: 2, including Jonathan Ashmore

Rosalie Sylvia Crutchley (4 January 1920 – 28 July 1997) was a British actress. Trained at the Royal Academy of Music, she was perhaps best known for her television performances, but had a long and successful career in theatre and films, making her stage debut in 1932 and her screen debut in 1947.

Crutchley had dark piercing eyes and often played foreign or rather sinister characters. She also played many classical roles, including Juliet in Shakespeare's Romeo and Juliet, Hermione in The Winter's Tale and Goneril in King Lear.

== Life and career ==
Crutchley was born in London on 4 January 1920. She trained at the Royal Academy of Music.

Her screen debut was as a violinist who is murdered in Take My Life (1947). She played Madame Defarge twice in adaptations of A Tale of Two Cities, in both the 1958 film and in the 1965 television serialisation of the same story.

She played Catherine Parr in the 1970 TV series, The Six Wives of Henry VIII and played the same character in its sequel, Elizabeth R (1971). She had previously portrayed Henry's first wife Catherine of Aragon in the 1953 film The Sword and the Rose.

Other roles included Mrs Sparsit in Hard Times (ITV, 1977) and Electra (1974). She also starred in the 1979 BBC TV production of Testament of Youth, playing the role of the Principal of Somerville College, Oxford. She was in the films Quo Vadis (1951), as Acte, the former mistress of the Emperor Nero (Peter Ustinov) and The Haunting (1963), as the sinister housekeeper Mrs Dudley.

Crutchley also appeared in film adaptations of two A.J. Cronin novels, The Spanish Gardener (1956) and Beyond This Place (1959) and played the flinty maiden aunt in the TV adaptation of Brendon Chase (1980–81). She had two guest roles in Casualty, in 1992 and 1995. She also had a cameo role in Four Weddings and a Funeral (1994).

She appeared in only one film musical, Man of La Mancha (1972), based on the successful stage production, as Don Quixote's housekeeper. In the role, her less-than-good singing voice was used for intentionally comic effect in the song "I'm Only Thinking of Him".

Her final acting role was in the pilot episode of the TV detective series, Midsomer Murders, playing Lucy Bellringer. This was shown in 1997, shortly before her death.

== Personal life ==
She was married twice, firstly to actor Dan Cunningham in 1939 and secondly to actor Peter Ashmore in 1946. Both marriages ended in divorce. She had two children, one of whom is the physicist Jonathan Ashmore.

Crutchley died at The Harley Street Hospital in London in 1997 at the age of 77.

== Filmography ==
=== Film ===
Year	Title	Role	Notes
1947	Take My Life	Elizabeth Rusman	
1950	Prelude to Fame	Carlotta Ferugia	
1951	The Lady with a Lamp	Mrs Sidney Herbert	
1951	Quo Vadis	Claudia Acte	
1953	Malta Story	Carmella Gonzar	
1953	The Sword and the Rose	Queen Katherine	
1954	Flame and the Flesh	Francesca	
1955	Make Me an Offer	Bella	
1956	The Gamma People	Frau Bikstein	
1956	The Spanish Gardener	Magdalena	
1957	Miracle in Soho	Mafalda Gozzi	
1957	Seven Thunders	Therese Blanchard	
1958	A Tale of Two Cities	Madame Defarge	
1959	Beyond This Place	Ella Mathry	
1959	The Nun's Story	Sister Eleanor	
1960	Sons and Lovers	Mrs Leivers	
1961	No Love for Johnnie	Alice Byrne	
1962	Freud: The Secret Passion	Amalia Freud	
1963	The Haunting	Mrs Dudley	
1963	The Model Girl Murder Case	Maude Klein	
1964	Behold a Pale Horse	Teresa Viñolas	
1970	Wuthering Heights	Mrs Earnshaw	
1971	Whoever Slew Auntie Roo?	Miss Henley	
1971	Creatures the World Forgot	The Old Crone	
1971	Blood from the Mummy's Tomb	Helen Dickerson	
1972	Au Pair Girls	Lady Tryke	
1973	The House in Nightmare Park	Jessica Henderson	
1973	And Now the Screaming Starts!	Mrs Luke	
1974	Mahler	Marie Mahler	
1976	The Message	Somaya	
1983	The Keep	Josefa	
1988	A World Apart	Mrs Harris	
1990	The Fool	Mrs Harris	
1994	Four Weddings and a Funeral	Mrs Beaumont	
1994	A Pin for the Butterfly	Anna	

=== Television ===
Year	Title	Role	Notes
1947	The Tragedy of Romeo and Juliet	Juliet Capulet	TV film
1947	The Infernal Machine	The Sphinx	TV film
1948	The Tragedy of King Lear	Goneril	TV film
1949	Crime Passionel	Olga	TV film
1949	Ladies in Waiting	Janet Garner	TV film
1955	The Messenger	Mary	TV film
1955	Madeleine	Madeleine	TV film
1955	London Playhouse	Tina Bordereau	Episode: "A Garden in the Sea"
1956	Colonel March of Scotland Yard	Annette	Episode: "Death in Inner Space"
1956	Romney	Margaret Vaughn	TV film
1956	The Gambler	Polina Alexandrovna	TV film
1956	Nom-de-Plume	Elisa	Episode: "The Ten Strangers"
1956	Assignment Foreign Legion	Lucette	Episode: "The Outcast"
1956, 1964	Armchair Theatre	Mary Charrington, Miriam	Episodes: "Black Limelight", "Cradle Song"
1957	Eye Witness	Ruth	TV film
1958	Television World Theatre	Andromache	Episode: "Women of Troy"
1959	The Hill	Mary Magdalene	TV film
1959	The Flying Doctors	Jean Dawson	Episode: "The Shock"
1959	Play of the Week	Elsa	Episode: "The Last Hours"
1960	The Soldier and the Woman	Rachel	TV film
1961	BBC Sunday-Night Play	Donna Lucia D'Alvadorez	Episode: "Charley's Aunt"
1961	The Complaisant Lover	Mary Rhodes	TV film
1961	The Pursuers	Vi Webber	Episode: "The George Webber Story"
1962	The Winter's Tale	Hermione	TV film
1962	The Franchise Affair	Marion Sharpe	6
1962	Maigret	Aimee Malik	Episode: "The Dirty House"
1963	Suspense	Anna Blake	Episode: "Thunder on Sycamore Street"
1963	The Human Jungle	Naomi Leigh Brooke	Episode: "A Woman with Scars"
1963	Sergeant Cork	Victoria Melrose	Episode: "The Case of the Sleeping Coachman"
1964	The Full Man	Lady MacBeth	Episode: "Tragedy"
1964	Festival	Mrs Sarti	Episode: "The Life of Galileo"
1964	The Count of Monte Cristo	Hermine Danglars	Regular role
1965	Hit and Run	Georgina Prestley	Episodes: "Accident", "Enquiry", "Arrest", "Trial"
1965	A Tale of Two Cities	Madame Defarge	TV series
1965	Armchair Mystery Theatre	Anna	Episode: "The Madam"
1965	The Mask of Janus	Madame Navachine	Episode: "Rendezvous"
1965–1966	The Wednesday Play	Mrs Liddel, Pauline Tenterden, Caridad Mercader	Episodes: "Alice", "The Connoisseur", "The Executioner"
1967	The Paradise Makers	Inga Swynnerton	Episodes: "1.1", "1.2", "1.4", "1.6"
1967	Sanctuary	Sister Euphrasia	Episode: "The Face of Hunger"
1967	The Prisoner	Queen	Episode: "Checkmate"
1967–1968	Theatre 625	Maria, Madame Calas	Episodes: "The Single Passion", "The Fanatics"
1968	City '68	Enid Somerset	Episode: "The Visitors"
1968	Cold Comfort Farm	Judith Starkadder	TV miniseries
1969	The Possessed	Varvara Stavrogin	TV miniseries
1969	ITV Sunday Night Theatre	Hannah Pritchard	Episode: "The Wicked Stage"
1969	Parkin's Patch	Miss Craig	Episode: "The Deserter"
1970	Manhunt	Hortense	Episode: "What Did You Do in the War, Daddy?"
1970	The Six Wives of Henry VIII	Catherine Parr	Episode: "Catherine Parr"
1970	Crime of Passion	Helene Jeygu	Episode: "Helene"
1970–1971	Jackanory	Storyteller	TV series
1971	Elizabeth R	Catherine Parr	Episode: "The Lion's Cub"
1973	Country Matters	Mrs Sadgrove	Episode: "The Higgler"
1973	Hadleigh	Kate	Episode: "The Goddaughter"
1973	The Return	Mrs Park	TV series
1974	Carrie's War	Hepzibah Green	Main role
1974	Fall of Eagles	Miehen	Episode: "Tell the King the Sky Is Falling"
1974, 1976	Play of the Month	Clytaemnestra, Mrs Bagot	Episodes: "Electra", "Trilby"
1975	Churchill's People	Hildis	Episode: "The Conquerors"
1975	Affairs of the Heart	Mrs Costello	Episode: "Daisy"
1975	North & South	Mrs Thornton	TV miniseries
1976	Bill Brand	Mrs Martin	Episode: "Tranquility of the Realm"
1977	Drama	Jocasta	Episode: "Oedipus Tyrannus by Sophocles"
1977	The Peppermint Pig	Aunt Sarah	TV series
1977	Hard Times	Mrs Sparsit	TV miniseries
1978, 1984	Play for Today	Mrs Howard, Laura	Episodes: "Destiny", "Moving on the Edge"
1979	Horse in the House	Gwen Davis	Episodes: "Right of Way: Parts 1 & 2"
1979	Testament of Youth	Miss Penrose	TV miniseries
1980, 1982	BBC2 Playhouse	Miss Snell, Beth	Episodes: "Gentle Folk", "Passing Through"
1980–1981	Brendon Chase	Aunt Ellen	TV series
1981	Cribb	Mrs Innocent	Episode: "The Hand That Rocks the Cradle"
1982	The Hunchback of Notre Dame	Simone	TV film
1982	Smiley's People	Mother Felicity	Episodes: "1.5", "1.6"
1982	The Agatha Christie Hour	Mrs Thompson	Episode: "The Red Signal"
1983	Chessgame	Mary Jenkins	Episodes: "Enter Hassan", "The Alamut Ambush"
1983–1985	By the Sword Divided	Margaret	Main role
1983–1984	Crown Court	Eloise Hunter	Episodes: "Mother's Boy: Part 1", "The Son of His Father: Part 1"
1984	The Testament of John	Mary	TV film
1985	Sherlock Holmes	Mrs Lexington	Episode: "The Norwood Builder"
1986	The Theban Plays by Sophocles	Eurydice	Episode: "Theban Plays: Antigone"
1986	Agatha Christie's Miss Marple: The Murder at the Vicarage	Mrs Price-Ridley	TV film
1986	The Alamut Ambush	Mary Jenkins	TV film
1987	Worlds Beyond	Mrs Pringle	Episode: "The Black Tomb"
1987	Great Performers	Teresa	Episode: "Monsignor Quixote"
1987	Dramarama	Miss Brady	Episode: "Badger on the Barge"
1988	Beryl Markham: A Shadow on the Sun	Mrs Markham	TV film
1988	The Franchise Affair	Mrs Sharpe	TV series
1989	Campion	Lisa	Episodes: "Death of a Ghost: Parts 1 & 2"
1989	Screen One	Gladys	Episode: "She's Been Away"
1990	God on the Rocks	Rosalie Frayling	TV film
1991	Dark Season	Mrs Polzinski	Episodes: "1.1", "1.2", "1.3"
1992	Anglo Saxon Attitudes	Stephanie Houdet	TV miniseries
1992, 1995	Casualty	Dodie Mitchell, Frances Newton	Episodes: "Cascade", "Sacrifice"
1993	Screen Two	Mrs Birt	Episode: "Femme Fatale"
1993	Agatha Christie's Poirot	Madame Deroulard	Episode: "The Chocolate Box"
1993	Lovejoy	Evie Smyton	Episode: "Taking the Pledge"
1993	Heartbeat	Florence Stockwell	Episode: "Endangered Species"
1994	Under the Hammer	Olga Krupenskya	Episode: "The Virgin of Vitebsk"
1994	A Skirt Through History	Florence Nightingale	Episode: "An Experiment"
1994	Cadfael	Juliana Aurifaber	Episode: "The Sanctuary Sparrow"
1995	A Village Affair	Lettice Deverel	TV film
1995	Wycliffe	Agnes Currow	Episode: "Wild Oats"
1997	Midsomer Murders	Lucy Bellringer	Episode: "The Killings at Badger's Drift"
