= William Simons =

Welsh actor (1940–2019)

- Simons as PC Alf Ventress in Heartbeat S16.E8 in 2006
- Born: Clifford William Cumberbatch Simons; 17 November 1940; Swansea, Glamorgan, Wales
- Died: 21 June 2019 (aged 78); London, England
- Other name: William Simmons
- Occupations: Actor; presenter
- Years active: 1950–2017
- Spouse(s): Janie Lowther (m. 1968; died 2002) Jackie Simons (m. 2007)

Clifford William Cumberbatch Simons (17 November 1940 – 21 June 2019) was a Welsh actor best known for his role as PC Alf Ventress in Heartbeat, a role he played from 1992 to 2010.

== Early life ==
Simons was born on 17 November 1940 in Swansea where his father was stationed in the Second World War and he grew up in South Wales until the family moved to North London. He started acting as a child, appearing in the films No Place for Jennifer (1950), Where No Vultures Fly (1951) and West of Zanzibar (1954). He then suffered from severe acne as a teenager, which caused him to prefer working backstage as a stage manager for four years before deciding to become an adult actor. Later in life, he would become a patron of the charity Changing Faces, which supports people with facial deformities.

== Heartbeat ==
Simons played PC Ventress for the entire 18-year run of Heartbeat. Although playing a heavy smoker, Simons was a non-smoker in real life and was given herbal cigarettes to play the part. The character is a policeman that lacks in the physical side but makes up for that with his ‘local knowledge’. Ventress is the longest serving officer for much of the drama and occasionally in a role as acting sergeant when Blaketon, Craddock and Merton are absent. In later series of the drama, Ventress is forced to retire from the force but continues as a civilian member of the team and also helps Oscar Blaketon (Derek Fowlds) in a private investigatory role. Simons appeared in 355 episodes of Heartbeat, more than any other actor.

== Other acting roles ==
Simons's other regular roles in television included the political dissident Quarmby in the 1971 series The Guardians, Martin O'Connor QC in Crown Court (1973–83), Constable Thackeray in Cribb (1979–81), and Inspector "Brer" Fox in The Inspector Alleyn Mysteries (1990–94).

Simons also made guest appearances in Doctor Who: The Sun Makers, Auf Wiedersehen Pet, Francis Storm Investigates, Coronation Street, The Sweeney, Minder as 'Pongo' Harris, Dempsey & Makepeace, Give Us a Break, The Darling Buds of May, Wish Me Luck, Bergerac, Casualty, The Bill, Lovejoy, Enemy at the Door and Rumpole of the Bailey.

== Death ==
Simons died on 21 June 2019, aged 78.

== Partial filmography ==
- No Place for Jennifer (1950) – Jeremy
- Where No Vultures Fly (1951) – Tim Payton
- West of Zanzibar (1954) – Tim Payton
- Not So Dusty (1956) – Derek Clark
- On the Fiddle (1961) – Private (uncredited)
- Mystery Submarine (1963) – Leading Seaman Grant
- Clash by Night (1963) – Guard Outside Barn (uncredited)
- Pope John Paul II (1984, TV film) – Foreman Krauze
- The Woman in Black (1989, TV film) – John Keckwick
