= Alan Dobie =

English actor

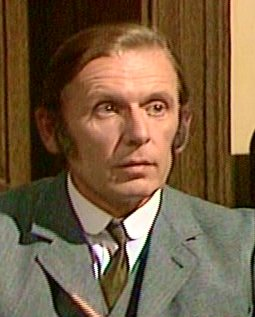
Alan Dobie as Sgt Cribb

Alan Russell Dobie (born 2 June 1932) is a retired English stage, television and film actor and a former member of the Royal Shakespeare Company.

== Early life and career ==
Dobie was born in Wombwell, West Riding of Yorkshire, England, to George Russell and Sarah Kate (née Charlesworth) Dobie. His father was a mining engineer and his mother's family were farmers. After attending Wath Grammar School, Dobie trained at the London Old Vic Theatre School and has performed in more than 117 productions during his 50+ year acting career.

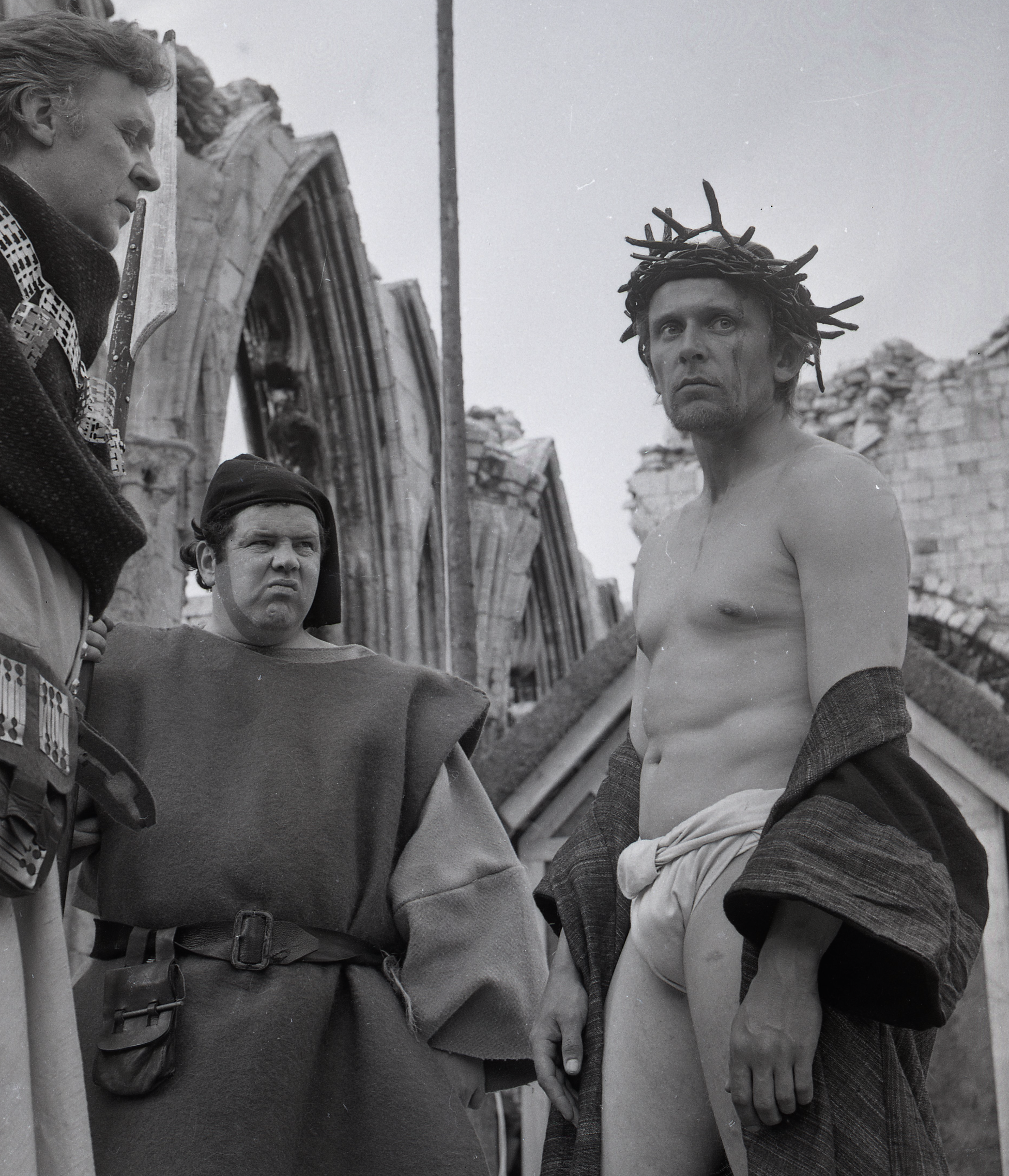
Alan Dobie as Jesus, York Mystery Plays, 1963

Dobie made his stage debut when he played the Page to Paris, in Shakespeare's Romeo and Juliet at the Old Vic Theatre, London, in 1952. In 1963 he played both God and Jesus in the open air, mainly amateur-cast York Mystery Plays, produced at that point triennially in the Yorkshire Museum Gardens. He made his Broadway debut as Corporal Hill in Chips with Everything, at the Plymouth Theatre in 1963.

== Later career ==
Dobie's stage roles in London's West End include: No Concern of Mine, Rosmersholm, The Complaisant Lover, The Tiger and the Horse, The Affair, Curtmantle, The Devils, Inadmissible Evidence, The Hallelujah Boy, The Wild Duck, Dancing at Lughnasa, Rough Justice, Hamlet and Waiting for Godot. At the Old Vic Theatre he performed in Romeo and Juliet, Italian Straw, Julius Caesar, Murder in the Cathedral, Henry VIII, Merchant of Venice, Macbeth, Love's Labours Lost, Taming of the Shrew, As You Like It, Richard II, Henry IV parts 1, & 2, Major Barbara, The Lonely Road, Waste and King Lear. At the Royal Court Theatre Dobie starred in Look Back in Anger, Live Like Pigs, Major Barbara, Serjeant Musgrave's Dance, One Leg Over the Wrong Wall, Chips with Everything, The London Cuckolds and Famine. In 1963 he played the role of Jesus Christ in the famous York Cycle of Mystery Plays. Dobie has directed The Merry Wives of Windsor, Season's Greetings and Wedding in White.

Dobie has an extensive list of television roles to his credit, including major parts in War and Peace (1972) for the BBC, Kessler (1981), The Troubleshooters and Hard Times (1977), among many others. In 1964–65 he was David Corbett, antagonist to hard-nosed business director John Wilder (played by Patrick Wymark) in the board-room drama The Plane Makers. In Cribb (1980–81), Dobie starred in the title role as the Victorian Detective Sergeant created by Peter Lovesey. Debuting as a television play for Granada Television in 1979, the series Cribb, developed from it, ran for 14 episodes. In (1986) Dobie took a leading role in Channel 4's The Disputation, playing Rabbi Moshe ben Nahman, with Christopher Lee as King James I of Aragon, based on a true story.

He was married to actress Rachel Roberts from 1955 to 1961, then married Maureen Scott in 1963. He appeared with his daughter, Natasha, in the TVTimes Star Challenge show, made by ITV Central in 1984.

== Partial filmography ==
- The Firm of Girdlestone (1958, TV series) - Ezra Girdlestone
- Captured (1959)
- Seven Keys (1961) - Russell
- Dr. Syn, Alias the Scarecrow (1963) - Mr. Frank Fragg - Prosecutor
- The Comedy Man (1964) - Jack Lavery
- The Charge of the Light Brigade (1968) - Riding Master Mogg
- The Long Day's Dying (1968) - Helmut
- The Chairman (1969) - Benson
- Alfred the Great (1969) - Ethelred
- Danton (1970) - Robespierre
- Madame Sin (1972) - White
- War and Peace (1972–73, TV) - Andrei Bolkonsky
- Eleanor Marx (1977, TV series) – Edward Aveling
- Hard Times (1977, TV) - Stephen Blackpool
- Hedda Gabler (1981, TV) - Judge Brack
- Master of the Game (1984, TV)
- Men and Wild Horses (1986, TV docudrama) – Charles Clement
- The Disputation (1986, TV film) - Nachmanides
- White Mischief (1987) - Harragin
