= The Franchise Affair =

The Franchise Affair may refer to:

- The Franchise Affair (novel), a 1948 novel by Josephine Tey
- The Franchise Affair (film), a 1951 British film, based on the novel
- The Franchise Affair (1962 TV series), a British television series, based on the novel
- The Franchise Affair (1988 TV series), a British television series, based on the novel
