= A Shilling for Candles =

1936 mystery novel by Josephine Tey

- First edition
- Author: Josephine Tey
- Language: English
- Series: Inspector Alan Grant
- Genre: Mystery Novel
- Published: 1936
- Publisher: Methuen Publishing
- Publication place: United Kingdom
- ISBN: 999753056X
- Preceded by: The Man in the Queue
- Followed by: The Franchise Affair

A Shilling for Candles is a 1936 mystery novel by Josephine Tey (Elizabeth MacKintosh) first published in 1936 by Methuen in the UK. It is the second of Tey's six mysteries featuring Inspector Alan Grant, and the first book written under the Josephine Tey pseudonym. The plot features the investigation of the death of the film actress Christine Clay.

== Development ==
The plot draws extensively on Tey's experience in working with actors in her successful play Richard of Bordeaux, which was produced in London's West End in 1932-1933. The play starred John Gielgud and Gwen Ffrangcon-Davies. Tey also worked as a contract writer in Hollywood.

The character Marta Hallard is believed to be based on actress Marda Vanne, whose partner Gwen Ffrangcon-Davies was the leading lady in Richard of Bordeaux.

Like the character Christine Clay, Tey left the bulk of her money to the National Trust for Places of Historic Interest or Natural Beauty.

== Explanation of title ==
Clay's will includes the bequest "To my brother Herbert, a shilling for candles". Herbert is a con man who poses as religious. Grant comments that this bequest is the only sign of real enmity he has discovered in Clay's relationships.

== Plot ==
An early morning walker discovers the body of a woman at the edge of the surf on a beach in Kent. People hope she is the victim of a drowning accident, but the presence of a button tangled in her hair, and signs of struggle on her hands, lead Inspector Grant to conclude she has been murdered.

Grant’s suspicion quickly falls on her house guest, Robert Tisdall, who admits to having stolen the victim's car and then regretted it and returned to the beach. Tisdall had been her guest in a rented cottage for four days at the time of the murder. He claims not to have known that his hostess was film star Christine Clay, who had rented the cottage in secret to have an anonymous holiday; only her husband and the owner know where she is. Tisdall inherited a fortune but had squandered it, was on the point of suicide, and was rescued when Clay randomly encountered him in London, offering him hospitality out of kindness. She did not tell him her full name, instructing him to call her "Chris".

Clay's identity is revealed when Jason Harmer, her songwriter, arrives at the cottage having tracked down its location from a clue in a letter he received from her. Once her identity becomes public, Lydia Keats, an astrologist, receives considerable attention for having correctly predicted that Clay would drown.

The day before the murder, Clay wrote to her lawyer instructing him to add a codicil to her will bequeathing a small portion of her estate — a ranch in California and five thousand pounds — to Tisdall. The bulk of her estate is left to "maintain the beauty of the English countryside", as she knows her husband has sufficient wealth.

Tisdall does not know about the bequest to him until the police tell him.

Although it goes against his intuition, Grant is convinced of Tisdall's guilt by the motive provided by the bequest. Another suspicious circumstance is that Tisdall's coat, which has buttons similar to the one found in Clay's hair, has been stolen.

Grant decides to arrest Tisdall, but he escapes. Later, Erica Burgoyne, the 16-year-old daughter of the local Chief Constable, finds Tisdall and brings him food. Erica believes Tisdall's story about his coat, and sets out to find it. She is successful, and the coat has no missing buttons. Grant concludes that Tisdall is innocent. Tisdall cannot be found and anxiety mounts regarding his safety.

Grant is back at square one. He next investigates Clay's brother Herbert Gotobed, who turns out to be a con man with a history of posing as a religious prophet.

Clay's husband, Lord Edward Champneis (pronounced “chins”), arouses suspicion by failing to account for his whereabouts on the night before the murder, but Grant is reluctant to confront him because he is highly regarded in society.

Lydia Keats gives a talk about astrology. Her audience, including actors, actresses, aristocrats and one police officer, really wants to hear about her foretelling one year earlier that Clay would die. Lydia blurts out that Clay’s killer is in the room; that statement drives the frightened audience out in a crush.

Grant tracks Gotobed to a monastery in Canterbury, not far from Clay's rented cottage. Gotobed is on the point of being given control of a large amount of money as Prior, since the incumbent is about to leave Canterbury to lead the brotherhood's Mexican mission. Eventually Gotobed is arrested for his stash of phony passports, and extradited to the US.

Champneis's suspicious behaviour is discovered to be due to an effort to help a political exile to obtain sanctuary in London. Tisdall re-surfaces, having hidden in an attic for several days; he is feverish and on the point of pneumonia, but recovers.

At a loss for the next step, Grant decides to get a haircut. While waiting, he happens across an article in an old magazine that points out how celebrated Lydia Keats will be if her prediction of death by drowning for a film star — not identified in the article — comes true, and hints that the star should not go swimming with Keats for fear she might be tempted to make her prediction a reality. He telephones the cottage's owner, Owen Hughes, and finds that he mentioned Clay's tenancy of the cottage to Keats, forgetting that it was supposed to be a secret. Keats has a motorboat that could have given her easy access to the beach where Clay was killed. Grant investigates and finds a coat in the motorboat that is missing a button on one sleeve. He confronts Keats. She raves about her infallibility and the glorious destiny predicted for her by the stars, and is taken away by the police surgeon.

The final scene of the book is a dinner party attended by Grant and Tisdall at the Burgoyne home. Grant is happy to see that Erica is still her young and independent self, and has not fallen in love with Tisdall.

== Characters ==
- William Potticary, early morning walker along the beach who works at the Coastguard station
- Bill Gunter, Potticary's colleague at the Coastguard station
- Robert Stannaway, also known as Tisdall, staying at Briars Cottage
- Christine Clay, successful and talented film actress, about 30 years old, rented Briars cottage. She is dead by drowning.
- Owen Hughes, owner of Briars, actor in Hollywood
- Mrs Pitts, cook for the Briars' guests
- Jammy Hopkins, crime and passion writer for The Clarion
- Inspector Alan Grant, from Scotland Yard at the inquest
- Erica Burgoyne, skinny 16-year-old girl daughter of the Chief Constable; active and direct
- Colonel Burgoyne, father of Erica and Chief Constable for the County
- Superintendent Barker, boss of Grant
- Sergeant Williams, assists Inspector Grant

Christine’s circle

- Marta Hallard, famed actress in London, a level below Clay’s talents and success
- Lord Edward Champneis (pronounced Chins), married to Christine Clay four years earlier; he writes books about inhospitable countries. Independently wealthy.
- Lydia Keats, astrologer with a newspaper column; she makes predictions, including foretelling Christine’s death by drowning.
- Judy Sellers, actress who plays dumb blondes
- Jason Harmer, songwriter and friend to Christine Clay
- Herbert Gotobed, only brother of Christine Clay. He is a conman who preaches religion until ejected from an area. They are estranged, but he keeps track of his sister.
- Rosa Freeson, partner of Gotobed when he is a monk in Canterbury; her face shows as his wife on many fake passports.

== Adaptations ==
=== Film ===
The novel was adapted for Young and Innocent (1937) directed by Alfred Hitchcock, starring Nova Pilbeam and Derrick De Marney.

=== Radio ===
There have been various full cast adaptations for BBC Radio:

- 1954, adapted by Rex Rienits and produced by Charles Lefeaux. Part of the Saturday Night Theatre series.
- 1963, adapted by Rex Rienits and produced by Audrey Cameron. Part of the Saturday Night Theatre series.
- 1969, adapted by Rex Rienits and produced by Betty Davies. Part of the Saturday Night Theatre series.
- 1998, adapted by John Fletcher and directed by Tabitha Potts. Part of The Saturday Play series. This version dispenses with much of the plot, changes the identity of the murderer, and presents the remaining narrative as a Wodehousian romantic romp.

There have been several solo readings for BBC Radio:

- 1959, in 12 episodes, abridged by Donald Bancroft and read by Ronald Wilson.
- 2003, in two episodes, abridged by [undetermined] and read by [undetermined].
- 1993, BBC audiobook, unabridged and read by Stephen Thorne. Produced by Chivers Audio Books and released on cassette.

== Publication history ==
First published in 1936 by Methuen Publishing in London. First American edition in 1954 from The Macmillan Company, New York. ISBN 0099576325; ISBN 9780099576327.
