= The Laughing Woman =

The Laughing Woman may refer to:

- The Laughing Woman (film), a 1969 Italian erotic thriller film
- The Laughing Woman (play), a 1934 British play by Gordon Daviot
