= The Man in the Queue =

1929 novel

- 1953 US edition (Macmillan)
- Author: Josephine Tey
- Language: English
- Series: Inspector Grant
- Genre: Detective
- Publisher: Methuen (UK); E. P. Dutton (US)
- Publication date: 1929
- Publication place: United Kingdom
- Media type: Print
- Followed by: A Shilling for Candles
- Text: The Man in the Queue online

The Man in the Queue is a 1929 detective novel by the British writer Josephine Tey. It was the first in her series of six novels featuring the Scotland Yard detective Inspector Grant. It was released during the Golden Age of Detective Fiction. It was initially published under the pseudonym Gordon Daviot, and published by Methuen in London and Dutton in New York.

== Plot summary ==
A young man is stabbed in the back with a stiletto dagger while waiting in the queue for standing room at one of the final West End performances of a hit musical comedy starring actress and singer Ray Marcable. None of those near him in the queue noticed him until he collapsed, nor did they appear to have any motive for killing him. The dead man carries no identification; the only item found on him is a service revolver.

Inspector Alan Grant is brought onto the case, and he follows several painstaking leads, first to learn the identity of the dead man and then to track the possible killer who approached the dead man in the queue. Only one person notices the victim and recalls another man who came to argue with the victim, describing his appearance to Grant.

Alan Grant is independently wealthy and not solely dependent on his wage as a “plainclothes policeman”. He makes philanthropic uses of his money and also enjoys the best restaurant in town. He has Mrs. Field at home to look after him, making his breakfast of bacon and eggs. He relaxes by fishing.

One lead takes Grant to Nottingham, without much result, though he learned activities that drew people there. Eventually he traces a potential suspect to the boarding house where both the dead man, Albert Sorrell, a betting agent or bookmaker, and the possible killer, Gerald "Jerry" Lamont, lived as roommates until a day before the murder of Sorrell. Learning Sorrell’s occupation explains his trips to Nottingham, where horse races are held. Lamont’s job was as clerk to Sorrell. Mrs Everett and Jerry Lamont knew Sorrell was sailing to America the day after the musical comedy, and thus neither thought he might be the fair-haired dead man until four or five days after his murder.

Grant gets photos of both men from their landlady, Mrs Everett. Learning about Mrs Everett's family, Grant tracks the suspect to a hideaway in Carninnish on the west coast of Scotland where her clergyman brother lives. Here he meets Miss Dinmont, a London nurse by profession and niece of Mrs Everett and her uncle Logan, the clergyman. Grant uses a motorboat to catch Lamont attempting to escape in a rowboat. Lamont jumps out of the rowboat, hitting his head, and is saved by Grant.

After tracking and arresting Lamont, Grant begins to have doubts about Lamont's guilt as he brings him back to London. In London, Grant seeks Sorrell’s luggage left at a train station. He finds a woman’s brooch in a case, with initials spelled out in gem stones. At the jeweller's, he learns it was custom made and expensive.

Lamont is brought before magistrate’s court where his attorney objects to the manner of his confession. Grant expresses his misgivings to Superintendent Barker, his superior, but his doubts are brushed aside. Grant's attempts to pursue another possible suspect, which leads to nothing, and he is almost forced to concede defeat.

Sitting with Barker, Grant hears the confession of the “fat woman” from the queue, Mrs Wallis. Barker wants to send her away, until Grant realises she is the mother of Ray Marcable, born Rose Markham, the star of the musical. Mrs Wallis had encountered Sorrell a few weeks earlier, when he said this regarding Ray going to America: “At least, it isn't certain. Either we're both going or neither of us is going.”(Chapter 18, Conclusion)

Bert Sorrell had known Rose Markham in childhood when she was raised by her aunt and uncle Markham, and he had been in contact with her in her current stardom. He gave her the brooch, which she sent back. Upon his rejection, he was planning to make a scene at the performance, killing her and possibly killing himself. Mrs Wallis sensed Sorrel’s crazy state of mind and used a knife her late first husband brought back from his sailing voyages to kill him. No one had taken her seriously as a suspect in the early part of the investigation.

Police speculate how Mrs Wallis might be treated in court, and feel she will not be hanged.

Grant ends by reflecting that there was no villain in the case.

== Reception ==
Kirkus Reviews reviewed this novel in 1953 when the novel was reprinted by Macmillan in the “Murder Revisited Series”. The novel was published in 1929 under her pseudonym of Gordon Daviot, and under Josephine Tey in 1953. The plot gave “solid proof for the unreliability of circumstantial evidence.” The novel gave no preparation for the ending which justified Grant’s misgivings about Lamont, yet Kirkus Reviews was pleased to have this novel, liking the writing of Josephine Tey.
