= To Love and Be Wise =

1950 novel

- 1951 American edition
- Author: Josephine Tey
- Language: English
- Series: Inspector Grant
- Genre: Detective
- Publisher: Peter Davies; Macmillan (US)
- Publication date: 1950
- Publication place: United Kingdom
- Media type: Print
- Preceded by: The Franchise Affair
- Followed by: The Daughter of Time

To Love and Be Wise is a 1950 mystery detective novel by the British writer Josephine Tey. It was the fourth of six novels featuring Detective Inspector Grant of Scotland Yard during the Golden Age of Detective Fiction.

== Synopsis ==
At a theatrical party in London Grant briefly encounters a young American, whose connections as a famous photographer grant him an invitation to stay at the home of a well-known writer in an English village that has become fashionable among the artistic set. A few days later Grant is called in when the American has disappeared, mostly likely into the river. What at first seems a routine case of accident, or at worst murder, becomes for the detective a more complex investigation of identity as he begins to ponder whether any accident or crime has taken place at all.

== Bibliography ==
- Herbert, Rosemary. Whodunit?: A Who's Who in Crime & Mystery Writing. Oxford University Press, 2003.
- Miskimmin, Esme. 100 British Crime Writers. Springer Nature, 2020.
- Reilly, John M. Twentieth Century Crime & Mystery Writers. Springer, 2015.
- Van Dover, J.K. The Detective and the Artist: Painters, Poets and Writers in Crime Fiction, 1840s–1970s. McFarland, 2019.
