= George Pitcher (producer) =

British film producer

George Pitcher was a British film producer and production manager who worked in the 1950s and 1960s. He helped produce the film version of Day of the Triffids.

== Select credits ==
- Trottie True (1949)
- Curtain Up (1952)
- Gift Horse (1952)
- Genevieve (1953)
- Always a Bride (1953)
- It's Never Too Late (1956)
- The Birthday Present (1957)
- Happy Is the Bride (1958)
- Law and Disorder (1958)
- Whirlpool (1959)
- A Story of David (1960)
- The Day of the Triffids (1963)
- Lancelot and Guinevere (1963)
- The Heroes of Telemark (1965)
- Georgy Girl (1966)
- Charlie Bubbles (1968)
