= A Story of David =

1962 British film by Bob McNaught

- Directed by: Bob McNaught
- Written by: Gerry Day; Terence Maples
- Produced by: William Goetz; George Pitcher; Irving Starr
- Starring: Jeff Chandler; Basil Sydney; Peter Arne
- Production companies: Scoto; Mardeb; ABC Television
- Release date: 18 November 1962 (US TV)
- Countries: United Kingdom; Israel

A Story of David (also known as David the Outlaw) is a 1961 British-Israeli drama film directed by Bob McNaught and starring Jeff Chandler, Basil Sydney and Peter Arne. It was written by Gerry Day and Terence Maples and depicts the life of the Biblical King David and his conflicted relationship with King Saul.

It was one of the first films made for television.

== Plot ==
Saul becomes jealous of the popularity of his protege and son-in-law David. David goes into hiding. In a fit of rage, Saul tries to kill David with a spear, but David manages to escape and gathers a group of followers. Saul becomes increasingly obsessed and relentlessly hunts David to kill him, but David refuses to fight Saul, out of respect for him as king. Therefore, David keeps moving from one territory to another to avoid Saul's attacks, while Jonathan, Saul's firstborn son and David's best friend, assists him in his escape.

== Cast ==
- Jeff Chandler as David
- Basil Sydney as King Saul
- Peter Arne as Doeg
- David Knight as Jonathan
- Barbara Shelley as Abigail
- Donald Pleasence as Nabal
- Richard O'Sullivan as Abiathar
- Robert Brown as Jashobeam
- David Davies as Abner
- Angela Browne as Michal
- John Van Eyssen as Joab
- Martin Wyldeck as Hezro
- Charles Carson as Ahimilech
- Zena Marshall as Naomi
- Alec Mango as Kudruh
- Peter Madden as Chief Herder

== Production ==
The film was a co-production between ABC-TV and William Goetz. It was shot in Israel and London. It was intended that the film be released as two one-hour episodes for TV in the US and as a feature in other countries. Part one was to be called David the Outlaw; part two David the Hunted.

"It's a simple story," said Chandler "only half a dozen people in it. There'll be no chariot race." Filming took place in Israel in August and September 1960; Israel troops guarded them near the Jordan border. The unit then shifted to Elstree studios in London. Filming had completed by October.

== Release ==
ABC could not find a sponsor for the program. It eventually screened on ABC as a Sunday night movie in 1962. The film drew record high ratings and prompted ABC to commission a series Great Bible Stories.

== Reception ==
The Monthly Film Bulletin wrote: "A Story of David has the simple charm of Sunday School story ... Unexpectedly, the narrative has more than a touch of the traditional Western, with the uncomplicatedly honest outlaw gathering his forces together against unlikely odds In order to rout the badman's reign of violence. And, as in a minor Ford Western, with its gallery of comfortingly familiar faces, Bob McNaught devotes much of his film to bold strokes sketching in the uncomplicated warmth and humanity of the goodies ... to set against the sneering treachery of the baddies. A little more action, and more boldness in the use of exteriors might have sparked off an attractive trend in Biblical Westerns."

Kine Weekly wrote: "Last and least, A Story Of David: Britain's muted reply to America's The Ten Commandments and Ben-Hur. It's no giant-killer, and that's putting it mildly."

Variety wrote: "Oddly enough, this feature-length dramatization of the lean middle years of David, being more indigenous to the dimensions of the large screen than the living room tube, would probably have had more impact and value as a theatri¢al release than as a television attraction. ... Chandler's portrayal of David was a typical performance by the late actor: one of quiet, understated strength, masculinity and appeal. Supporting performances were generally solid, under Bob McNaught's firm direction. Three younger players came off quite well: Barbara Shelley as the courageous Abigail, David Knight as the faithful and perceptive Jonathan (Soul's son and heir to the throne), and Richard O'Sullivan as the orphaned lad, Abiathar. Also efficient were Basil Sidney as Saul and Peter Arne as his wicked, cunning henchman, Doeg."
