= John Forrest (actor) =

Actor, artist and stage magician (1931–2012)

- Born: John Forsht; March 14, 1931; Bridgeport, Connecticut
- Died: March 28, 2012 (aged 81); London, England
- Other names: John Forrest Cairns; John Klox
- Education: Imperial Service College; Highgate School
- Occupations: Actor; Artist; Magician
- Years active: 1946–1990s

John Forrest (14 May 1931 – 28 March 2012) was an American-born British actor, artist and stage magician probably best remembered today for playing the young Herbert Pocket in the film Great Expectations (1946), directed by David Lean.

== Early life and education ==
He was born as John Forsht in Bridgeport in Connecticut in 1931 to an American lawyer father and British artist mother. On the breakup of the marriage when Forrest was aged five, his mother took him and his sister to England where, in 1939 at the start of World War II the family moved to Taplow on the River Thames; here his mother took in lodgers. Among these was the magician Herbert Spencer, a relative of the celebrated artist Stanley Spencer. Herbert Spencer taught the ten year-old Forrest card tricks. An alcoholic, Spencer fell into the Thames and drowned.

During the War Forrest attended the Imperial Service College in Windsor where a contemporary was the future-racing driver Stirling Moss. He encouraged Forrest to put on his own magic shows. After the War Forrest moved with his mother and sister to a flat in Kensington in London, where he was to live until his death in 2012. Here he attended from April 1945 Highgate School, as John Forrest Cairns (his mother's surname), during which period his mother, herself an artist, encouraged him to take up painting.

== Career ==
=== Actor ===
In 1946 Forrest was cast as the young Herbert Pocket in David Lean's film Great Expectations. He later recalled, "Suddenly I had responsibility – the sun came out," and his acting career began. Although the part was small he was noticed by the critics, and the fight between the two youths Pip and Pocket was described in the Best of British film guide as "the funniest scrap ever seen on the screen." He followed this success with small roles in Bonnie Prince Charlie (1948) opposite David Niven; in The Guinea Pig opposite Richard Attenborough (1948); and opposite Jean Simmons in Adam and Evelyne (1949). He played Leslis Wynn in The Franchise Affair (1951) and was Appleby in Gift Horse (1952).

In 1949 Laurence Olivier cast him as the Young Collector opposite Vivien Leigh in a production of A Streetcar Named Desire at the Aldwych Theatre. In 1951 he played Flashman in the film Tom Brown's Schooldays, with Variety applauding "a standout performance by John Forrest as the sneering, bullying Flashman". By now, Forrest was balancing his acting career with that of a professional magician, making his début at Fulham Town Hall in 1955. Later, he was to become a member of the Inner Magic Circle.

In the late 1950s Forrest began a career as a radio actor, often working for the BBC Third Programme's producer Raymond Raikes and during the 1970s he was a member of the Radio Drama Company. In 1952 he played on stage opposite Barbara Jefford in Pinero's Trelawny of the "Wells" at the Lyric Theatre in Hammersmith; while in 1955 he appeared in the West End production of The Remarkable Mr. Pennypacker opposite Nigel Patrick. In 1961 he played "Grassy" Green, an undercover German agent in a POW camp, in the British comedy film Very Important Person opposite James Robertson Justice. His television roles included Forbes Thompson in an episode of Dr. Finlay's Casebook (1964), and he appeared in Thunder in the West (1957), Little Women (1958), Emergency Ward 10 (1959), Armchair Theatre (1959), and as Beadle in the 1970 Omnibus episode "A Requiem for Modigliani". He played Captain Blifil in the film The Bawdy Adventures of Tom Jones (1976).

=== Magician ===
During the 1980s and 1990s Forrest turned more to his magic act, with which he toured the world. Moving to Paris he performed in cabaret venues there and in Monte Carlo as "John Klox". During his eight-minute act he would make clocks appear and disappear and seemingly float through the air. As John Klox he appeared on The Sooty Show (1968), The Good Old Days (1953) and International Cabaret (1964). Forrest also performed his act in Palm Springs, Hollywood and Los Angeles.

== Death ==
John Forrest died in London in 2012 aged 81. His mother and sister had predeceased him.

== Filmography ==
=== Film ===
- 1946: Great Expectations – The Pale Young Gentleman, Herbert Pocket
- 1948: Bonnie Prince Charlie – Neil (uncredited)
- 1948: The Guinea Pig – Fitch
- 1949: Adam and Evelyne – Tony
- 1951: The Franchise Affair – Leslis Wynn
- 1951: Tom Brown's Schooldays – Flashman
- 1952: Gift Horse (aka Glory at Sea) – Sub-Lieutenant Appleby, the Captain's Steward
- 1961: Very Important Person (aka A Coming Out Party) – "Grassy" Green
- 1976: The Bawdy Adventures of Tom Jones – Captain Blifil

=== Television ===
John Forrest television credits
Year	Title	Role	Notes	Ref.
1957	Thunder in the West	Jonathan Carey	6 episodes	
1958	Good Wives	Fred Vaughn	6 episodes	
1959	Emergency Ward 10	Charles Wood	6 episodes	
1959	Armchair Theatre	Jeremy	1 episode	
1964	Dr. Finlay's Casebook	Forbes Thompson	1 episode	
1970	Omnibus	Beadle	Episode: "A Requiem for Modigliani" (S4.E9)	
