= Young and Innocent =

1937 film by Alfred Hitchcock

- Theatrical release poster
- Directed by: Alfred Hitchcock
- Written by: Gerald Savory (dialogue); Alma Reville (continuity)
- Screenplay by: Charles Bennett; Edwin Greenwood; Anthony Armstrong
- Based on: A Shilling for Candles; 1936 novel by Josephine Tey
- Produced by: Edward Black (uncredited)
- Starring: Nova Pilbeam; Derrick De Marney
- Cinematography: Bernard Knowles
- Edited by: Charles Frend
- Music by: Jack Beaver (uncredited); Louis Levy (uncredited)
- Production company: Gaumont-British
- Distributed by: General Film Distributors
- Release dates: November 1937 (London); 17 February 1938 (US)
- Running time: 83 minutes
- Country: United Kingdom
- Language: English

Young and Innocent, released in the US as The Girl Was Young, is a 1937 British crime thriller film directed by Alfred Hitchcock and starring Nova Pilbeam and Derrick De Marney. Based on the 1936 novel A Shilling for Candles by Josephine Tey, the film is about a young man on the run from a murder charge who enlists the help of a woman who must put herself at risk for his cause. An elaborately staged crane shot Hitchcock devised, which appears towards the end of the film, identifies the real murderer.

== Plot ==
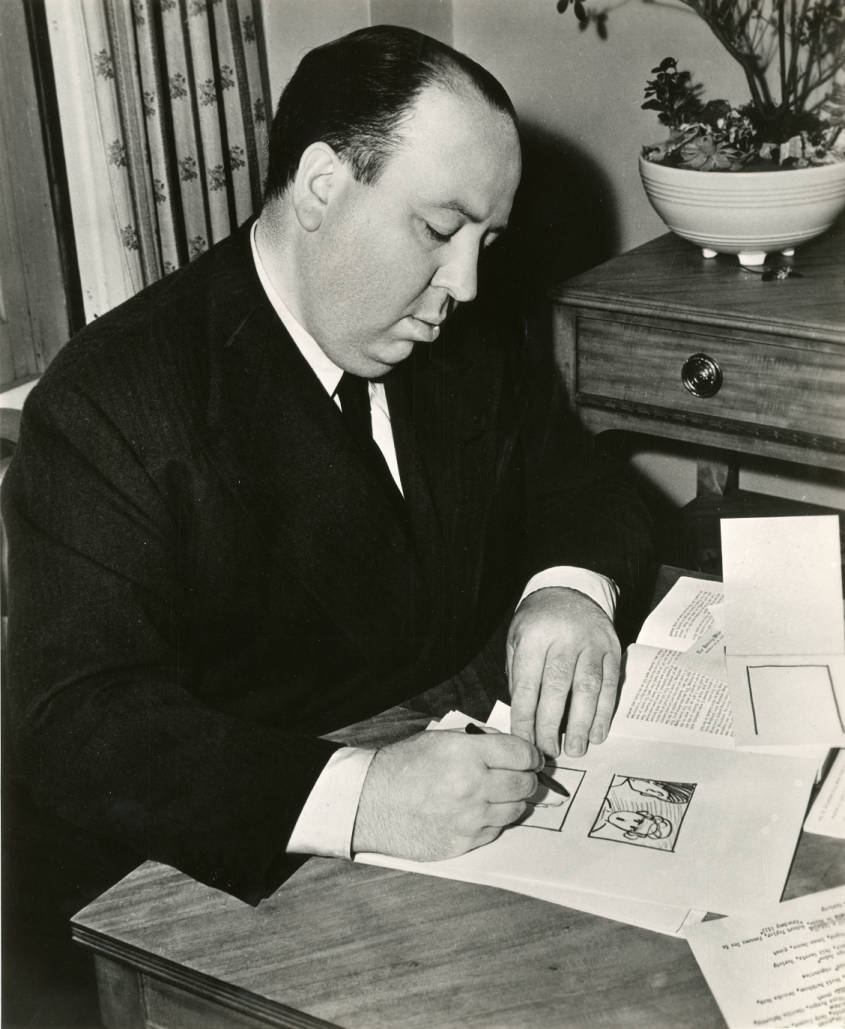
Hitchcock in 1939

On a stormy night, at a retreat on the English coast, Christine Clay, a successful actress, argues passionately with her jealous ex-husband Guy. Not accepting her Reno divorce as valid, he accuses her of having an affair. Finally, she slaps him and he leaves the room. His eyes twitch violently.

The next morning, writer Robert Tisdall is walking along the seaside when Christine's dead body washes ashore. He recognizes her, and runs for help. Two young women arrive just in time to see him racing away from the corpse. The police quickly decide that Tisdall is the only suspect. Christine was strangled with the belt from a raincoat; his raincoat is missing and he says it was recently stolen. He admits having known Christine for three years since he sold her a story.

Scotland Yard detectives grill him all night. They suggest he was having an affair with Christine. When they tell him she left him a large sum of money in her will, he faints. He is revived with the aid of Erica Burgoyne, daughter of the local police Chief Constable. Tisdall is assigned an incompetent solicitor, and is taken into court for his formal arraignment. Doubting if his innocence will ever be established, he takes advantage of overcrowding in the courthouse to escape. He gets away by riding on the running board of Erica's Morris car, revealing himself to her after the car runs out of petrol.

He helps push the car to a filling station, pays for petrol, and convinces her to give him a ride. Though she is initially fearful and unsure about her passenger, Erica eventually becomes convinced of his innocence and decides to help him. They are eventually spotted together, forcing both to stay on the run from the police. Tisdall tries to prove his innocence by tracking down the stolen coat: if it still has its belt, the one found next to Christine's body must not be his.

The duo succeed in tracing Tisdall's coat to Old Will, a homeless china-mender. But Will was not the thief; he was given the coat by a man with "twitchy eyes", and with its belt already missing.

After becoming separated from the others, Erica is taken in by the police. Upon realizing that his daughter has fully allied herself with a murder suspect, her father chooses to resign his position rather than arrest her for assisting a felon. Tisdall sneaks into their house to see Erica, intending to surrender and assert he kidnapped her, but she mentions that the coat had a box of matches from the Grand Hotel in a pocket. As Tisdall has never been there, he surmises perhaps the murderer has a connection to the hotel.

The following evening, Erica and Will go to the hotel together, hoping to find him. It is revealed that Guy is the drummer in the band in the hotel ballroom, performing in blackface. His eyes are twitching.

Recognizing Old Will in the audience, and seeing policemen nearby (who have actually followed Will, hoping he would lead them to Tisdall), Guy performs poorly due to fear. He is berated by the conductor and, during a break, takes medicine to try to control the twitching, but it makes him very sleepy. Eventually, in mid-performance, Guy passes out, drawing the attention of Erica and the police. Immediately after being revived and confronted, he confesses his crime and begins laughing hysterically. With Tisdall exonerated, Erica happily introduces him to her father.

== Cast ==
- Nova Pilbeam as Erica Burgoyne
- Derrick De Marney as Robert Tisdall
- Percy Marmont as Colonel Burgoyne
- Edward Rigby as Old Will
- Mary Clare as Erica's aunt Margaret
- John Longden as Inspector Kent
- George Curzon as Guy
- Basil Radford as Erica's uncle Basil
- Pamela Carme as Christine Clay
- George Merritt as Detective Sergeant Miller
- J. H. Roberts as the solicitor, Henry Briggs
- Jerry Verno as lorry driver
- H. F. Maltby as Police Sergeant
- John Miller as Police Constable
- Syd Crossley as policeman
- Torin Thatcher as the owner of Nobby's lodging house
- Anna Konstam as bathing girl (uncredited)
- Bill Shine as manager of Tom's Hat Cafe (uncredited)
- Beatrice Varley as accused man's wife (uncredited)
- Peter Thompson as Erica Burgoyne's bespectacled brother (uncredited)

== Production ==
The film was the first of two Hitchcock made for producer Ted Black, the other being The Lady Vanishes. Leading lady Nova Pilbeam was only 17 at the time of filming.

== Reception ==
Variety called the film a "Pleasing, artless vehicle" for Nova Pilbeam, who was "charming" in her role and concluded, "If the pic is not Hitchcock's best effort, it is by no means unworthy of him." Frank Nugent of The New York Times called it a "crisply paced, excellently performed film." The Monthly Film Bulletin wrote, "Innumerable small touches show Hitchcock's keen and penetrating observation and his knowledge of human nature. Comedy, romance, and thrills are skilfully blended." Harrison's Reports wrote, "Good melodramatic entertainment. Because of the novelty of the story, the interesting plot developments, and the expert direction by Alfred Hitchcock, one's attention is held from the beginning to the end."

John Mosher of The New Yorker, however, wrote that it was "rather exasperating and disappointing to me. It begins with a smart murder, but wanders off through the English rural landscape in a fashion so lacking in that sound common sense we like in our mysteries, or like to feel is there anyhow, that one's interest fades away."

Aggregator Rotten Tomatoes reports a 100% approval of Young and Innocent based on 16 reviews, with an average rating of 7.5/10.

== Changes from the novel ==
American theatrical release poster with alternate title

Significant changes were made in adapting the book for the film. The novel is a whodunit centred on the Scotland Yard inspector, who is Tey's regular character Alan Grant. The storyline involving Robert Tisdall, Erica Burgoyne, and the missing coat is similar to the film story, but in the novel it is only a subplot and ends part way through the book when Erica finds the coat and it is intact. Grant then focuses on other suspects, none of whom (including the actual murderer in the novel) appear in the film. Christine Clay in the novel is not divorced, but is in an unconventional marriage to an aristocrat.

== Hitchcock's cameo ==
Alfred Hitchcock's cameo is a signature occurrence in most of his films. He can be seen outside the courthouse, holding a camera, at 18 minutes into the film.

== Copyright status and home media ==
Young and Innocent is copyrighted worldwide but has been heavily bootlegged for home video. Despite this, licensed releases have appeared on Blu-ray, DVD and video on demand services worldwide from the likes of Network Distributing in the UK, MGM and The Criterion Collection in the US, and others.

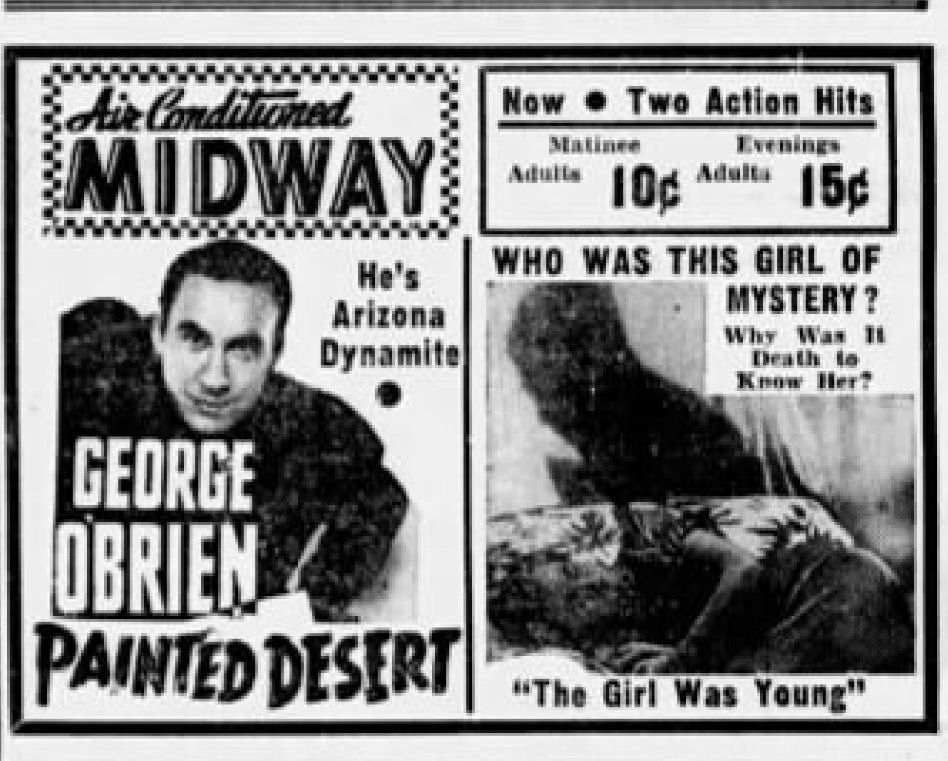
American advertisement for The Girl Was Young and Painted Desert
