= Inspector Alan Grant series =

Fictional character

The Inspector Alan Grant series consists of six mystery novels by the Scottish author Josephine Tey. This includes The Daughter of Time, Tey's most acclaimed work.

== Alan Grant ==
Physically, Grant is dark haired, has a Ronald Colman moustache, and is a dapper dresser. He has a keen interest in poetry (having occasionally dabbled himself), the theatre, fishing, horse riding and golf. He is quite wealthy owing to a legacy from a relative, and is very generous with money to others.

Grant has a good relationship with his colleagues, particularly Sergeant Williams, who worships him. He has had some romantic prospects (including actress Marta Hallard), but prefers to remain single.

== Novels ==
- The Man in the Queue (1929) (originally published under the pen-name of Gordon Daviot)
- A Shilling for Candles (1936)
- The Franchise Affair (1948)
- To Love and Be Wise (1950)
- The Daughter of Time (1951)
- The Singing Sands (1952)

== Adaptations ==
=== Film ===
- A Shilling for Candles was adapted into the 1937 Alfred Hitchcock film Young and Innocent. Grant (renamed Inspector Kent and played by Hitchcock regular John Longden) plays only a small role.
- John Bailey portrayed Grant in 1951's The Franchise Affair.

=== Television ===
- The Franchise Affair was twice adapted as a serial for BBC Television. Grant was played by Clifford Earl in the 1962 series and by John Vine in the 1988 series.
  - The Singing Sands was adapted as an episode of the BBC anthology series Detective with John Carson as Grant.

=== BBC Radio ===
- Peter Coke starred as Grant in a 1955 adaptation of The Man in the Queue for the Saturday Night Theatre
- A Shilling for Candles was adapted several times for BBC Radio. Grant was portrayed by Gordon Davies (1954), Bryden Murdoch (1963), Denys Hawthorne (1969) and Ben Crowe (1998)
- The Franchise Affair was dramatised in 1952 with Duncan McIyntyre as Grant, and in 2005 with Steven McNicoll as the inspector.
- The Daughter of Time was adapted in 1982 with Peter Gilmore as Grant.
- The Singing Sands was dramatised in 1956 with Ewan Roberts as Grant.

=== Stage ===
- A theatrical adaptation of The Daughter of Time, dramatised by M. Kilburg Reedy, debuted at the Charing Cross Theatre on July 18, 2025. The part of Grant was taken by Rob Pomfret.
