= The Bawdy Adventures of Tom Jones =

1976 British film by Cliff Owen

- American Theatrical Release Poster
- Directed by: Cliff Owen
- Written by: Jeremy Lloyd
- Based on: The History of Tom Jones, a Foundling by Henry Fielding
- Produced by: Robert Sadoff
- Starring: Nicky Henson; Trevor Howard; Terry-Thomas
- Cinematography: Douglas Slocombe
- Edited by: Bill Blunden
- Music by: Ron Grainer
- Production companies: Robert Sadoff Productions; Chobridge Productions
- Distributed by: Universal Pictures
- Release date: August 1976
- Running time: 94 minutes
- Country: United Kingdom
- Language: English

The Bawdy Adventures of Tom Jones is a 1976 British comedy film directed by Cliff Owen and starring Nicky Henson, Trevor Howard and Terry-Thomas. It is an adaptation of the 1749 novel Tom Jones by Henry Fielding, which follows the main character in a new series of misadventures. It drew poor comparisons with the 1963 film Tom Jones.

== Cast ==
- Nicky Henson as Tom Jones
- Trevor Howard as Squire Western
- Terry-Thomas as Mr. Square
- Arthur Lowe as Dr. Thwackum
- Georgia Brown as Jenny Jones
- Joan Collins as Black Bess
- William Mervyn as Squire Alworthy
- Murray Melvin as Blifil
- Madeline Smith as Sophia
- Geraldine McEwan as Lady Bellaston
- Jeremy Lloyd as Lord Fellamar
- Gladys Henson as Mrs Wilkins
- Maxine Casson as Prudence
- Joan Cooper as Nellie
- Isabel Dean as Bridget
- Arnold Diamond as Noisy Reveller
- Hilda Fenemore as Mrs. Belcher
- John Forrest as Captain Blifil
- James Hayter as Briggs
- Arthur Howard as Old Vicar
- Patricia McPherson as Molly Seagram
- Frank Thornton as Whitlow
- Jean Gilpin as Lady at Ball

== See also ==
- Cinema of the United Kingdom

== Bibliography ==
- Sigoloff, Marc. The Films of the Seventies: A Filmography of American, British and Canadian Films 1970-1979. McFarland, 2000.
