= The Franchise Affair (1988 TV series) =

British television series

- Genre: Drama
- Based on: The Franchise Affair by Josephine Tey
- Written by: James Andrew Hall
- Directed by: Leonard Lewis
- Starring: Patrick Malahide; Joanna McCallum; Rosalie Crutchley
- Country of origin: United Kingdom
- Original language: English
- No. of series: 1
- No. of episodes: 6

Production
- Producer: Terrance Dicks
- Running time: 30 minutes
- Production company: BBC

Original release
- Network: BBC One
- Release: 25 September – 30 October 1988

The Franchise Affair is a British six-part television series which originally aired on BBC One in 1988. It is based on the 1948 novel The Franchise Affair by Josephine Tey.

== Main cast ==
- Patrick Malahide as Robert Blair
- Joanna McCallum as Marion Sharpe
- Rosalie Crutchley as Mrs Sharpe
- Miranda Bell as Miss Tuff
- David Ellison as Inspector John Hallam
- James Garbutt as Mr Heseltine
- Alex Jennings as Nevil Bennet
- Penelope Nice as Mrs Wynn
- Grant Parsons as Leslie Wynn
- Timothy Block as Stanley Peters
- Kate Emma Davies as Betty Kane
- Jean Heywood as Aunt Lin
- John Vine as DI Grant
- Edward Wilson as Benjamin Corley
- David Doyle as Wallis
- Peter James Holloway as Herbert
- Jo Rowbottom as Mildred Pinner
- Catherine Terris as Anita Kenton

== Bibliography ==
- Baskin, Ellen . Serials on British Television, 1950-1994. Scolar Press, 1996.
