= Brat Farrar =

1949 novel by Josephine Tey

- First edition
- Author: Josephine Tey
- Language: English
- Publisher: Peter Davies
- Publication date: 1949
- Media type: Print
- ISBN: 978-0-671-50978-1

Brat Farrar is a 1949 crime novel by Josephine Tey, based in part on the Tichborne case.

== Plot ==
The story is about the Ashbys, an English country-squire family. Their centuries-old family estate is Latchetts, in the fictional village of Clare, near the south coast of England. It takes place in the late 1940s, after World War II.

The Ashby family consists of Beatrice Ashby ("Aunt Bee"), a spinster of about 50, and the four children of her late brother Bill: Simon, 20; Eleanor, 18–19 and the twins Jane and Ruth, 9.

Bill and his wife Nora died eight years earlier. Since then, the Ashbys have been short of money. Bee has kept the estate going by turning the family stable into a profitable business and combining breeding, selling and training horses with riding lessons. When Simon turns 21, he will inherit Latchetts and a large trust fund left by his mother.

Simon had a twin brother, Patrick, who was older than him by a few minutes, but soon after Bill and Nora died, Patrick had disappeared and left what was taken to be a suicide note.

The title character, Brat Farrar, is a young man recently returned to England from America. He was a foundling. At the age of 13, the orphanage placed him in an office job but he ran away instead. He ended up in the western US, where he worked at ranches and stables for several years and became an expert horseman, until a fall injured his leg, leaving him with a limp.

On a street in London, someone completely unknown to Brat greets him as "Simon". The stranger is Alec Loding, a second-rate actor. He knows the Ashby family intimately and sees a way to help his own fortunes.

Alec's idea is for Brat to impersonate Simon's missing twin, Patrick, and, as the elder brother, claim the trust and the estate. Alec remembers a great deal about the Ashbys, Latchetts and the village, which will allow him to coach Brat on all of the background details. In return, Brat will give him a share of the money. Brat is reluctant but eventually agrees, especially when he hears about the horses.

After two weeks of tutoring, Brat appears at the office of the Ashby family solicitor saying he adopted the name "Brat Farrar" after he had run away. He gives his own story as the account of Patrick's missing years. Mr Sandal informs Bee, who meets Brat and is convinced. Over the next two weeks, Sandal verifies Brat's story. The family receives "Patrick" at Latchetts.

His presence leads to the discovery of Patrick's actual fate of being murdered by Simon. The final confrontation leaves Simon dead and Brat in hospital. There, Bee's Uncle Charles identifies Brat as an illegitimate son of Bee's wastrel cousin, Walter.

== Adaptations ==
A version was produced in 1950 and shown on television in the series "The Philco-Goodyear Television Playhouse".

The novel was loosely adapted in 1963 by Hammer Films as Paranoiac, but some of the novel's details are changed in the film. The Ashbys are wealthy by other means with no money problems and so do not need to raise horses, Simon's disappeared twin is named Tony rather than Patrick, the impostor who plays Tony is not a long-lost cousin, and the character of Uncle Charles does not appear.

In 1986, the BBC and A&E Television Networks adapted Brat Farrar for television as a six-part miniseries. The setting of the story was shifted from the 1940s to the 1980s. In the US it was broadcast on PBS as three hour-long episodes.

The Oxford University Press made an adaptation of the original story to be sold to students.

BBC Radio 4 broadcast a new adaptation of the book in March 2025 alongside an edition of the literature series Opening Lines on Brat Farrar and the writer Josephine Tey, presented by John Yorke and produced by Caroline Raphael.

In February 2004 it was announced that Ben Affleck would produce and star in a film adaptation of the novel but that film was never made.
