= The Daughter of Time =

1951 mystery novel by Josephine Tey

- First edition cover
- Author: Josephine Tey
- Language: English
- Series: Inspector Alan Grant
- Genre: Mystery novel
- Publisher: Peter Davies
- Publication date: 1951
- Media type: Print (hardback and paperback)
- Preceded by: To Love and Be Wise
- Followed by: The Singing Sands

The Daughter of Time is a 1951 detective novel by Josephine Tey, concerning a modern police officer's investigation into the alleged crimes of King Richard III of England. It was the last book Tey published in her lifetime, shortly before her death. In 1990 it was voted number one in The Top 100 Crime Novels of All Time list compiled by the British Crime Writers' Association (CWA).

== Plot summary ==
Scotland Yard Inspector Alan Grant (a character who also appears in five other novels by the same author) is feeling bored while confined to bed in hospital with a broken leg. Marta Hallard, an actress friend of his, suggests he should amuse himself by researching a historical mystery. She brings him some pictures of historical characters, aware of Grant's interest in human faces. He becomes intrigued by a portrait of King Richard III. He prides himself on being able to read a person's character from his appearance, and King Richard seems to him a gentle, kind and wise man. Why is everyone so sure that he was a cruel murderer?

With the help of other friends and acquaintances, Grant investigates Richard's life and the case of the Princes in the Tower, testing out his theories on the doctors and nurses who attend to him. Grant spends weeks pondering historical information and documents with the help of Brent Carradine, a likable young American researcher working in the British Museum. Using his detective's logic, he comes to the conclusion that the claim of Richard being a murderer is a fabrication of Tudor propaganda, as is the popular image of the king as a monstrous hunchback.

== Themes and arguments ==
The book explores how history is constructed, and how certain versions of events come to be widely accepted as the truth, despite a lack of evidence and/or any logical plausibility. Grant comes to understand the ways in which myths or legends are constructed, and how in this case, the victorious Tudors saw to it that their version of history prevailed.

The novel's title is taken from an old proverb ("Truth is the daughter of time") which is quoted by Tey as the novel's epigraph. Like all aphorisms this proverb has been directly quoted, paraphrased or enhanced many times over the centuries by multiple famous literate thinkers such as Aulus Gellius and Abraham Lincoln (direct quotes); Sir Francis Bacon (enhanced quote: "Truth is the daughter of time, not of authority"); and Thales (paraphrase: "It is time that has discovered, or in due course will discover, all things that lie hidden"), to name just a few.

The novel also explores and pastiches different types of historical writing. In his research, Grant starts with children's history books, then moves on to general popular histories and the very scholarly but dull Tanner's Constitutional History of England. He also reads Thomas More's History of King Richard III and a historical novel called The Rose of Raby by "Evelyn Payne-Ellis", about the life of Richard's mother Cecily Neville. Both Tanner's history and the novel are non-existent; it has been suggested that the title of the latter is derived from Guy Paget's 1937 biography of the same name.

Other alleged historical myths touched upon by the author are the commonly believed (but false) story that troops fired on the public at the 1910 Tonypandy Riot, the traditional depiction of the Boston Massacre, the martyrdom of Margaret Wilson, and the life and death of Mary, Queen of Scots. Grant adopts the term "Tonypandy" to describe widely believed historical myths, such as the supposed shootings at the Tonypandy Riots and believes popular accounts of Richard's activities to fall into this category. This line of thought reflects a dislike and distrust of emotional popular narratives concerning supposed historical injustices which also surfaces in Tey's other works.

== Grant's case for the innocence of Richard III ==
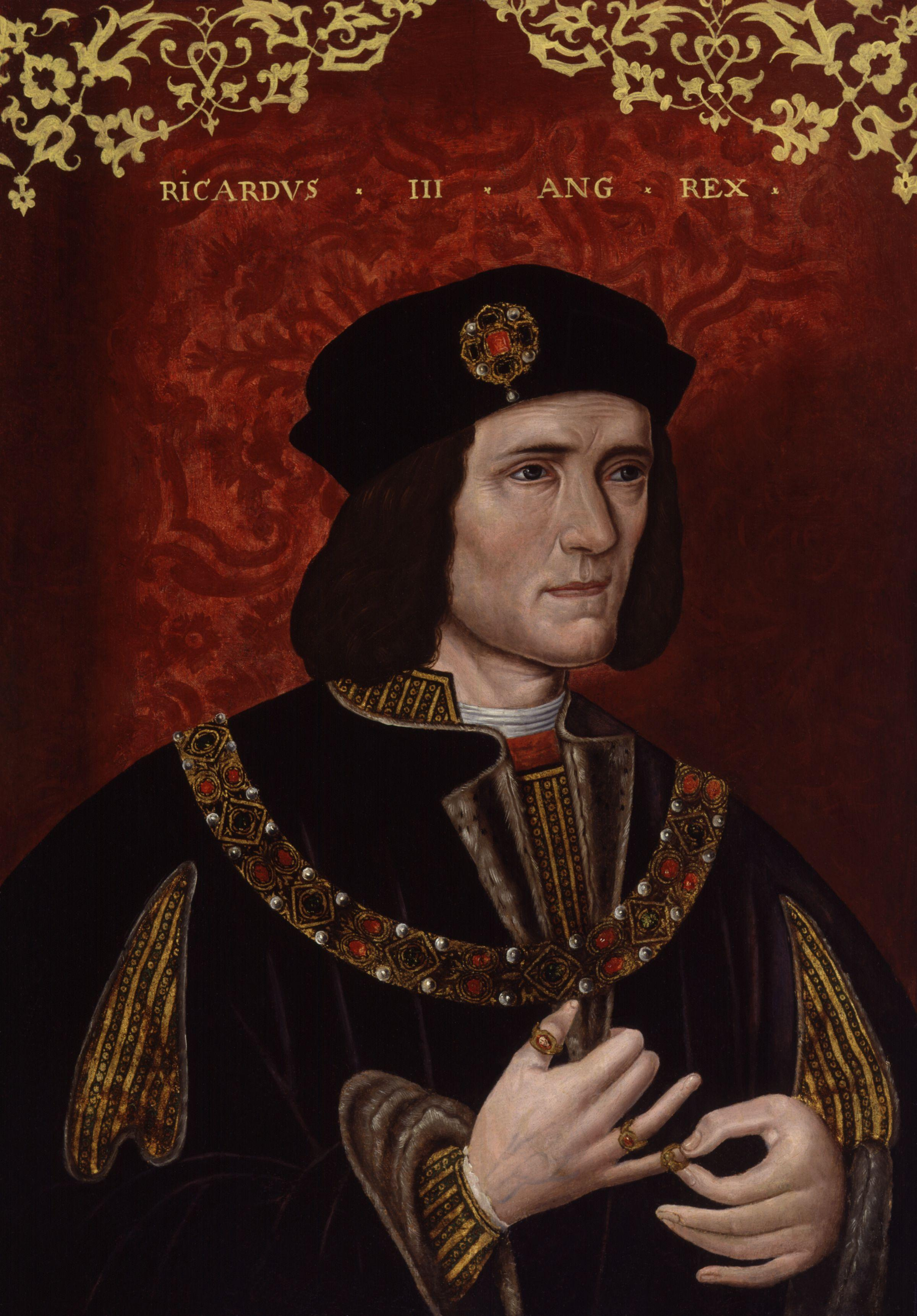
Late 16th-century portrait of Richard III (National Portrait Gallery, London), copied from an early 16th-century one in the Royal Collections. A reproduction of this version is kept by Grant at his bedside.

In this novel, as in her other works such as The Franchise Affair and Miss Pym Disposes, Josephine Tey relies partially on physiognomy as a means of determining an initial assessment of a person's character. Grant's first impetus towards an intellectual investigation of whether Richard III really had the two main heirs to his dead brother's throne callously murdered in the Tower of London is his early certainty that Richard's face could not possibly be that of someone who would perform such a base crime as the cold-blooded murder of his two young nephews. However, this is just an initial 'gut feel', the original spark that makes Grant want to know more about (and thus ultimately research and investigate) the true character and background of Richard III rather than any of the other historical personae of whom his friend Marta Hallard has provided him with images (in order to alleviate his bed-ridden boredom).

The subsequent police-like investigation that Grant undertakes during the remainder of the novel in order to find some circumstantial evidence that Richard (or anyone else) disposed of the princes reveals that there never was a bill of attainder, coroner's inquest, or any other legal proceeding that contemporaneously accused – much less convicted – Richard III of any foul play against the Princes in the Tower. It also points out that the princes were not reported missing by anyone until after the Battle of Bosworth Field, by which time Richard was dead and the princes were now in Henry VII's custody in the Tower. Grant comes to the conclusion that Henry is a much more likely perpetrator of the dual regicide than Richard when the question of "who instigated the killing of the princes?" is approached from the traditional crime detection perspective of means, motive and opportunity – particularly motive.

Tey's pro-Richard arguments repeat some of those made in Clements Markham's 1906 book Richard III: his life & character, reviewed in the light of recent research.

The main arguments presented in the book in defence of King Richard are as follows:

- There was no political advantage for Richard III in killing the young princes. With Titulus Regius enacted, the two princes represented no threat to Richard once he was crowned king.
- The two princes were more of a threat to Henry VII as the foundation of his Tudor claim to the crown was significantly weaker than theirs.
- Although a bill of attainder was brought by Henry VII against Richard after the battle of Bosworth it made no mention of the princes' disappearance from the Tower, suggesting that at the time the bill was presented to Parliament the princes were not yet missing.
- The bill of attainder that Henry and his supportive magnates did subsequently introduce against the deceased Richard merely accuses him generically of "cruelty and tyranny" during his reign – there is no specific accusation, nor even a mention, in it of Richard's suspected complicity in the princes' disappearance or assumed deaths.
- The mother of the princes, Elizabeth Woodville, remained on genuinely good terms with Richard once he was king, and her daughters regularly took part in social events at his court. Grant observes that this was hardly the behaviour of a mother who believed, or even just suspected, that Richard had ordered the deaths of both her young sons (ignoring the fact that regardless of the fate of the princes, Richard certainly did execute one of her sons and her brother, and the brother and uncle of her daughters, Sir Richard Grey and Anthony Woodville, 2nd Earl Rivers).
- There is no contemporary recorded evidence that the princes were missing from the Tower before Henry VII took over custody of them. It is only at that juncture that the rumours and speculative accusations start to be recorded in historical documents.

Grant and his American collaborator argue that there is little evidence of resistance to Richard's rule (ignoring Buckingham's rebellion). They allow that there were rumours of his murdering the princes during his lifetime, but they decide that the rumours had little circulation, and attribute them to the Croyland Chronicle and to the Lord Chancellor of France, and ultimately to Tudor sympathiser John Morton. They also propose that Morton was the actual author of Thomas More's biography of Richard, suggesting that the incomplete manuscript found after More's death was an unfinished copy by More of Morton's lost original. They conclude that the princes probably remained alive throughout Richard's reign and were later killed by Henry.

== Literary significance and criticism ==
On its publication Anthony Boucher called the book "one of the permanent classics in the detective field. ... one of the best, not of the year, but of all time". Dorothy B. Hughes also praised it, saying it is "not only one of the most important mysteries of the year, but of all years of mystery". The novel is listed as number one on the CWA's Top 100 Crime Novels of All Time list and number four on the MWA's Top 100 Mystery Novels of All Time list.

Winston Churchill stated in his History of the English-Speaking Peoples his belief in Richard's guilt of the murder of the princes, adding, "It will take many ingenious books to raise the issue to the dignity of a historical controversy", probably referring to Tey's novel, published seven years earlier. The papers of Sir Alan Lascelles contain a reference to his conversation with Churchill about the book.

== Adaptations ==
There have been two radio adaptations broadcast, in 1952 (scriptwriter not credited), and on 25 December 1982 on BBC Radio 4 FM's Afternoon Theatre, dramatised by Neville Teller.

A play written by M. Kilburg Reedy based on the book was performed in the Charing Cross Theatre, London, from 18 July to 13 September 2025.

Cast (in order of appearance):

- Nurse Ingham: Hafsa Abbasi
- Alan Grant: Rob Pomfret
- Marta Hallard: Rachel Pickup
- Nigel Templeton: Noah Huntley
- Nurse Darroll: Janna Fox
- Sergeant Williams: Sanya Adegbola
- Brent Carradine: Harrison Sharpe

The character of Nigel Templeton does not appear in the book, but was added to the play to provide a romantic sub-plot between Alan Grant and Marta Hallard.

== Works with related themes ==
- Guy M. Townsend's To Prove a Villain is a detective novel about a series of modern murders that seem to be linked to Richard III. The hero, a history professor, launches a scathing attack on Tey's arguments as "hopelessly unprofessional and untrustworthy for her 'slavish' following of Clements Markham's argument".
- Colin Dexter's Inspector Morse novel The Wench is Dead follows a similar plot, as Morse recuperates in a hospital whilst trying to solve a murder that occurred over a century before.
