= Paranoiac (film) =

1963 British film by Freddie Francis

- Theatrical release poster
- Directed by: Freddie Francis
- Written by: Josephine Tey
- Screenplay by: Jimmy Sangster
- Based on: Brat Farrar (1949 novel) by Josephine Tey
- Produced by: Anthony Hinds
- Starring: Janette Scott; Oliver Reed; Sheila Burrell; Alexander Davion
- Cinematography: Arthur Grant
- Edited by: James Needs
- Music by: Elisabeth Lutyens
- Production company: Hammer Film Productions
- Distributed by: Rank Film Distributors
- Release dates: 15 May 1963 (San Francisco); 26 January 1964 (London)
- Running time: 80 minutes
- Country: United Kingdom
- Language: English

Paranoiac is a 1963 British neo-noir psychological thriller film from Hammer Film Productions. It is directed by Freddie Francis, and stars Janette Scott, Oliver Reed, Sheila Burrell, and Alexander Davion. The screenplay, written by Jimmy Sangster, is based loosely on the 1949 novel Brat Farrar by Josephine Tey. The film was released by Rank Film Distributors.

== Plot ==
After the wealthy Mr. and Mrs. Ashby die in a plane crash, their three children were left in the care of their Aunt Harriet. Three years later, the elder son, Tony, jumped into the sea when he was 15 after he had left a suicide note, but his body was never recovered. Eight years later, the younger son, Simon, is a cruel spendthrift alcoholic, who tries to have his sister, Eleanor, committed for insanity so that he can be the sole heir.

Only three weeks before he inherits, a man resembling an adult Tony appears. Initially, he is seen only by Eleanor, who believes that her dead brother is calling her from beyond the grave. She is rescued by him during a suicide attempt.

The man claims to be Tony and that he simply ran away. Eleanor believes him, but Harriet calls him an impostor. In fact, he is a conman, who was hired by Keith Kossett, the son of the family attorney, to allow Kossett to keep embezzling from the estate.

"Tony" hears music from the family chapel at night. When he investigates, he is attacked by a masked figure with a hook. Eleanor heard the music before but was too afraid to leave her room. Simon appears to be open-minded about him but does not really believe him. Fearing that he will lose the inheritance, Simon sabotages the car when "Tony" and Eleanor go for a drive, and Eleanor is nearly killed.

That night, the music starts again. Eleanor and "Tony" investigate and see Simon playing the organ with a masked singer, but the singing emerges to be a recording. Eleanor is spotted by the masked person, who emerges with the hook but is stopped by "Tony." The masked person is revealed to be Aunt Harriet, who explains that Simon has been driven insane by guilt over Tony's death. The ritual calms Simon by allowing him to pretend that his brother is still alive. He plays a recording of Tony singing, Simon plays the organ, and Harriet is a masked "singer" and plays Tony's part.

Eleanor falls in love with "Tony" and is conflicted by her seemingly-incestuous thoughts. She is about to commit suicide, but he stops her and confesses that he is not her brother. Meanwhile, Simon had an affair with Eleanor's nurse, who guesses Simon's murder attempt and so tries to leave. When he stops her, she threatens to expose him, which makes him drown her in the garden pond. Simon tells Eleanor that the nurse left.

The fake Tony investigates the chapel. Despite Harriet's attempt to stop him he finds the real Tony's mummified body after their struggle reveals a hidden wall. He is about to leave but is stopped by Simon, who admits he had tricked the real Tony into writing the suicide note and then murdered him and that he had sabotaged the car. Simon slugs and binds him.

When the fake Tony comes to his senses, Simon plays the organ with the real Tony's body now seated on a chair. Simon informs the impostor that he and Tony had a talk and have decided to have the impostor "join" Tony.

Harriet appears and persuades Simon to leave since she will take care of the situation. She is unfazed at seeing the corpse and so evidently knew the truth as well. She sets the chapel on fire with a lantern to protect Simon and then leaves. Eleanor, alarmed by the fire, appears. She sees the real Tony's body and unties the fake Tony.

They flee the chapel, and since it is ablaze and Tony's body is inside, Simon's madness overwhelms him. He staggers to the chapel to try to "rescue" Tony but is trapped by the flames and is overcome as he clutches Tony's skeletal remains.

== Cast ==
- Janette Scott as Eleanor Ashby
- Oliver Reed as Simon Ashby
- Sheila Burrell as Aunt Harriet
- Maurice Denham as John Kossett
- Alexander Davion as "Tony Ashby"
- Liliane Brousse as Françoise
- Harold Lang as RAF Type
- Arnold Diamond as Publican
- John Bonney as Keith Kossett
- John Stuart as Williams

== Release ==
Paranoiac was first released theatrically in the United States, opening in San Francisco, California on 15 May 1963. It opened in January 1964 in London as a double bill with Hammer's Kiss of the Vampire (1963).

== Critical reception ==
The Monthly Film Bulletin wrote: "A thinly disguised variation on Taste of Fear (1961) and Maniac (1963), this is perhaps the most bizarre, far-fetched and tasteless Grand Guignol which Jimmy Sangster has yet scripted. Freddie Francis's direction is workmanlike without being notably imaginative; he has little luck solving the familiar Hammer problems of a diffuse, loose-ended script, stock characterisation and makeshift acting. The atmosphere has little of the requisite atmosphere which one found in a Thirties film along vaguely similar lines, The Case of the Frightened Lady (1940), nor, by any stretch of the imagination, is Oliver Reed a young Marius Goring. One finds oneself continually asking awkward questions, fatal in this kind of story which, if it is to work, needs to be consistently, rigidly stylised. An indication of the film's lack of purpose, even on its own level, is the revelation of the mummified schoolboy, shorn of all shock by its risible resemblance to a wizened old gnome."

The Radio Times Guide to Films gave the film 3/5 stars, writing: "This is one of the best of a cycle of psychological horror films Hammer made in the 1960s."

Leslie Halliwell said: "A complex maze of disguise, mistaken identity, family curses and revelations of something nasty in the woodshed, out of Psycho (1960) by Taste of Fear (1961). Not very good in itself, but interesting in its borrowings."

AllMovie called the film a "solid if not entirely satisfying entry in the wave of Psycho-inspired thrillers produced by England's Hammer Studios during the early-to-mid-'60s" ... The plot and the devices (organ played in the middle of the night, car brakes tampered with) now seem very hackneyed. But this was very popular with rebellious teens, and the twist ending is still not easily guessable."

== Home media ==
On 26 July 2010 a Blu-ray and DVD was released in the UK and made available for the first time on home video in the UK. The Blu-ray contains a restored Cinemascope high-definition transfer, optional music and effects track, the long-unseen original trailer, and high-definition stills gallery of rare materials (exclusive to the Blu-ray version).

In North America, the film had been released on 6 September 2005 along with seven other Hammer horror films on the 4-DVD set The Hammer Horror Series (ASIN: B0009X770O), which is part of MCA-Universal's Franchise Collection. The set was re-released on Blu-ray 13 September 2016. On 8 February 2022, Scream Factory released a collector's edition Blu-ray of the film.

== See also ==
- Gaslighting

== Sources ==
- Keaney, Michael F. (2010). British Film Noir Guide. Jefferson, North Carolina: McFarland. ISBN 978-0-786-46427-2.
