= The Singing Sands =

1952 novel by Josephine Tey

- Author: Josephine Tey
- Language: English
- Series: Inspector Grant
- Genre: Detective
- Publisher: Peter Davies
- Publication date: 1952
- Publication place: United Kingdom
- Media type: Print
- Preceded by: The Daughter of Time

The Singing Sands was the last of Josephine Tey's Inspector Grant mysteries, published posthumously by Peter Davies Ltd in 1952.

== Plot ==
Inspector Alan Grant has taken the overnight sleeper to the Scottish Highlands after being diagnosed with stress from overwork, which manifests itself as claustrophobia. On arrival, he chances on an attendant trying to rouse a man in a compartment reeking of whisky. Grant points out that the man is dead and proceeds on his holiday, stopping with his old school friend Tommy, now married to his cousin Laura. His intention is to spend some weeks fishing the glen, but he discovers on arriving that he has carried away a newspaper on which is scribbled a poem, "The beasts that talk, The streams that stand, The stones that walk, The singing sand…That guard the way To paradise". Realising that this may be a clue, he sends the paper to Scotland Yard but, the case not being his, goes on with his leave. He does break it out of interest, however, in order to visit a Hebridean island that is supposed to be distinguished by the 'singing sands' that give the book its title.

As the symptoms of stress begin to disappear in the book's second half, Grant returns to London, unsatisfied with the inquest's verdict of death by misadventure. A newspaper advert he places asking if anyone can identify the lines of the poem brings in a pilot colleague of Bill Kenrick, the dead man, which eventually provides the clarifying clue. Having been blown off-course by a dust storm over the Rub' al Khali (the Empty Quarter of the southern Arabian desert), Kenrick had discovered the location of the legendary lost city of Wabar. Benefiting from a stay in London, he had visited the veteran explorer Heron Lloyd, who immediately realised the significance of Kenrick's discovery. Being a vain man, Heron Lloyd wished to keep the glory of the city's identification for himself and had accordingly murdered Kenrick on the train and so arranged his death that it appeared accidental. Coincidentally, the papers now announce the city's discovery by a rival explorer. To avoid arrest, Heron Lloyd flees, posting Grant a confession and announcing his imminent suicide.

== Posthumous versions ==
Josephine Tey's final novel, The Singing Sands was found among her papers and published after her death in 1952. Adapted by Bertram Parnaby, it was later broadcast in 1956 for BBC Home Service's "Saturday Night Theatre" and televised in 1969 in an episode of the "Detective" series that is now missing. It was also read on BBC Radio 7 in 2008 in a four-part abridged version.
