= Richard of Bordeaux =

Play by Josephine Tey

- Programme cover depicting Gielgud as Richard
- Original language: English
- Written by: Gordon Daviot
- Subject: King Richard II tries to maintain peace in England
- Genre: Period piece
- Setting: Medieval England

Premiere
- Date: 1933
- Place: Arts Theatre

Richard of Bordeaux (1932) is a play by "Gordon Daviot", a pseudonym for Elizabeth MacKintosh, best known by another of her pen names, Josephine Tey.

The play tells the story of Richard II of England in a romantic fashion, emphasizing the relationship between Richard and his first wife, Queen Anne of Bohemia. The play was a major hit in 1933, playing a significant role in turning its director and leading man John Gielgud into a major star. Audiences found its portrayal of medieval characters speaking like modern people refreshing.

== Characters ==
(In order of their appearance)

- Fair Page, Maudelyn
- Dark Page
- Richard, King of England
- Anne, The Queen
- Thomas of Woodstock, Duke of Gloucester
- John of Gaunt, Duke of Lancaster
- Sir Simon Burley
- Edmund of Langley, Duke of York
- Michael de la Pole, Chancellor of England
- Richard, Earl of Arundel
- Thomas Arundel, Archbishop of Canterbury
- Robert de Vere, Earl of Oxford
- Mary, Countess of Derby
- Agnes Launcekron, the Queen's waiting-woman
- Henry, Earl of Derby
- Thomas Mowbray, Earl of Nottingham
- Maudelyn, the King's secretary
- Sir John Montague
- Edward, Earl of Rutland
- A Waiting-woman
- Doctor
- A man in the street
- Second man
- Third man
- Woman with loaves
- Woman with vegetables
- First page
- Second page
- Lord Derby's page

== Development ==
Daviot wrote the play after seeing John Gielgud play Shakespeare's Richard II at the Old Vic Theatre, and submitted it to him for production. Gielgud had reservations about the play but agreed to test it out for two matinée performances at the Arts Theatre.

Gielgud finally recognised the play's potential and directed it with himself as Richard at the New Theatre in February 1933. Prior to that production, Gielgud was regarded as a highly respected classical actor based on his performances at the Old Vic, but the overwhelming success of Richard of Bordeaux catapulted him into the status of superstar. The Times praised the rest of the cast, but added:

Mr Gielgud stands clear of them all. He has long had brilliant subtlety and sensitiveness; it is now clear that prestige does not flatter, but enables him, as it enables all genuine artists who search themselves, to discover new strength; he is acquiring the authority and presence that are the marks of a great actor.

The principal roles in the production at the New were played as follows:

- Richard II – John Gielgud
- Anne of Bohemia – Gwen Ffrangcon-Davies
- Duke of Gloucester – Eric Stanley
- Duke of Lancaster – Ben Webster
- Sir Simon Burley – George Howe
- Duke of York – Kinsey Peile
- Michael de la Pole – H. R. Hignett
- Earl of Arundel – Frederick Lloyd
- Robert de Vere – Francis Lister
- Mary Bohun – Margaret Webster
- Agnes Launcekron – Barbara Dillon
- Henry, Earl of Derby – Henry Mollison
- Thomas Mowbray – Donald Wolfit
- Sir John Montague – Walter Hudd
- John Maudelyn – Richard Ainley
- Edward, Earl of Rutland – Clement McCallin
- Thomas Arundel – Rayner Barton
- Doctor – Ralph Truman

The play ran for over a year in the West End (a substantial run for its time).

At the time the play was compared to Bernard Shaw's Saint Joan, which was also noted for the refreshingly modern and lighthearted language with which the medieval characters were portrayed speaking. The play depicts Richard in the light of the pacifism that was prevalent at the time, after the carnage of World War I. Richard is portrayed as a gentle, refined individual in a brutal militaristic culture, whose "struggle for peace is fine and ennobling". The depiction of Richard intentionally diverged radically from Shakespeare's portrayal of him as a self-dramatising narcissist preoccupied with his divine right to rule.

Many audience members came to see the play several times, and the production was notable for the fact that souvenir dolls were created and marketed depicting the actors in character.

== Productions ==
Richard of Bordeaux was originally produced at the Arts Theatre Club for two performances on June 26th and July 3rd, 1932. After some revisions, it was presented on February 2nd, 1933 at The New Theatre where it played to "enthusiastic" crowds for more than a year.

The first publication of the play was done in 1933 by Victor Gollancz Ltd.. Samuel French put out an actors edition in 1935. It was reproduced thereafter by Longman (known then as Longmans, Green and Company) in 1938, 1958 by Penguin Plays and in 1966 by Pan Books. It was included in a collection of other plays by Daviot in 1953. A German translation was published in 1959.

It went on to play in the British provinces many times, first on the original tour with Gielgud, then with other actors, on tour and in repertory revivals. Robert Morley variously played York and Gloucester in it. Michael Redgrave played Richard at Liverpool Playhouse, and John Clements at the Intimate Theatre in Palmer's Green.

The play crossed the Atlantic to Broadway in 1934 with Dennis King as Richard, but without Gielgud in the role, the play ran for only 38 performances.

The play was performed on television in 1938 with Andrew Osborn as Richard and the original Queen Anne, Gwen Ffrangcon-Davies. After the War, Osborn again played the part on the small screen, now with Joyce Heron as the Queen. Peter Cushing starred in 1955 in another BBC television version, which survives and has been shown at the National Film Theatre.

For BBC radio, Griffith Jones played the young King in 1946. Probably because its brand of 1930s pacifism became discredited as appeasement, the play is rarely revived. However, Laurence Payne played the King at the old theatre at Guildford after the War, when Kenneth Williams was John Maudelyn. Gielgud himself reprised his stage role at the microphone in 1941 and 1952. Some of the latter broadcast can be heard on a commercially released recording of Gielgud's audio work. Martin Jarvis was well-received as Richard in a 1974 radio production. Gielgud wrote a letter of congratulation to Jarvis on his performance.

In 1954, it was the premiere production of the new Crest Theatre Foundation theatre company in Toronto, Canada, starring Murray Davis and Barbara Chilcott.

== Projected film ==
Gielgud tried to make one of his then rare film appearances in the role in the 1930s and teamed with Alexander Korda to produce it, but the project fell through. He wrote to Douglas Fairbanks Jr., hoping to interest him in the project, and suggested Lillian Gish for the role of Richard's wife Anne. He later tried to persuade Dirk Bogarde to play the part on film in the 1960s, but to no avail.

== In other literature ==
In Josephine Tey's novel The Daughter of Time, which is about the reputation of King Richard III, the narrator says of the detective hero Alan Grant that though he was no expert on medieval history, "he had in his youth seen Richard of Bordeaux; four times he had seen it".
