= The Franchise Affair (1962 TV series) =

British television series

- Genre: Drama
- Based on: The Franchise Affair by Josephine Tey
- Written by: Constance Cox
- Directed by: Mervyn Pinfield
- Starring: Rosalie Crutchley; Michael Aldridge; Veronica Turleigh
- Country of origin: United Kingdom
- Original language: English
- No. of series: 1
- No. of episodes: 6 (all missing)

Production
- Producer: George R. Foa
- Running time: 30 minutes
- Production company: BBC

Original release
- Network: BBC One
- Release: 21 May – 25 June 1962

The Franchise Affair is a British television series that originally aired on BBC One in 1962. It is based on the 1948 novel The Franchise Affair by Josephine Tey.

All six episodes are believed to be lost.

== Main cast ==
- Rosalie Crutchley as Marion Sharpe
- Michael Aldridge as Robert Blair
- Veronica Turleigh as Mrs. Sharpe
- Gladys Boot as Aunt Lin
- Barry Wilsher as Leslie Wynn
- Derek Aylward as Tony Bredon
- Peggy Thorpe-Bates as Mrs. Wynn
- Leslie French as Mr. Heseltine
- Jack May as Kevin Macdermott
- Edward Harvey as Chief Insp. Hallam
- Meg Wynn Owen as Betty Kane
- Clifford Earl as Det. Insp. Grant
- Jennifer Hill as Miss Harker
- William Marlowe as Stan Peters

== Bibliography ==
- Baskin, Ellen . Serials on British Television, 1950-1994. Scolar Press, 1996.
