= Gift Horse (film) =

- UK DVD cover
- Directed by: Compton Bennett
- Written by: William Fairchild; Hugh Hastings; William Rose
- Produced by: George Pitcher
- Starring: Trevor Howard; Richard Attenborough; James Donald; Sonny Tufts
- Cinematography: Harry Waxman
- Edited by: Alan Osbiston
- Music by: Clifton Parker
- Production company: Molton Films
- Distributed by: Independent Film Distributors (UK)
- Release date: 16 July 1952 (UK)
- Running time: 100 minutes
- Country: United Kingdom
- Language: English
- Budget: £218,784

Gift Horse (U.S. title: Glory at Sea) is a 1952 British black-and-white World War II drama film directed by Compton Bennett, and starrimg Trevor Howard, Richard Attenborough, James Donald, and Sonny Tufts. It was written by William Fairchild, Hugh Hastings and William Rose, and was produced by George Pitcher. The film follows the story of the fictional ship HMS Ballantrae and her crew from the time they come together in 1940 until they go on a one-way mission to destroy a German-held dry dock in France. The final mission is based on HMS Campbeltown and the St Nazaire Raid. The title is a reference to the proverb "Never look a gift horse in the mouth".

== Plot ==
In the Second World War, the Royal Navy is desperately short of personnel. Court-martialled eight years before, Lieutenant Commander Fraser is brought out of retirement and put in command of the antiquated "four pipe" First World War-vintage ship HMS Ballantrae, formerly USS Whittier, one of the Town-class destroyers from the destroyers-for-bases deal. On her first mission, convoy escort duty, Ballantrae suffers a burst steam pipe and has to be left behind while repairs are effected.

The commander's reputation spreads around the harbour while still in Britain, resulting in a bar brawl between crews when his crew defends his reputation. Flanagan ends up on a charge due to this, ironically being punished by the man he was defending.

On her first mission, convoy escort duty, while attempting to attack a nearby U-boat the Ballantrae suffers a burst steam pipe and cannot attack the submarine. They do however successfully shoot down a plane before returning to port for repair. Fraser is offered a new ship but chooses to stay with the Ballantrae.

Whilst exercising close to the Cornish coast off Lizard Point the ship strikes a recently sunk ship, which should have been plotted on the charts. The ship is badly damaged. Fraser takes full blame for this during an enquiry by the Admiralty.

At Christmas 1941 Commander Fraser receives a telegram telling him that his son has been killed on active service. He does not show his grief. He celebrates with his crew, who have now given the ship the nickname "The Gift Horse".

Fraser's officers and crew resent his efforts to whip them into shape, but he eventually moulds them into an efficient fighting force, prior to being sent on Operation Boadicea, a daring suicide mission against a Nazi submarine base on the coast of France.

== Cast ==
- Trevor Howard as Lieutenant Commander Hugh Algernon Fraser
- Richard Attenborough as "Dripper" Daniels
- James Donald as Lieutenant Richard Jennings
- Sonny Tufts as "Yank" Flanagan
- Bernard Lee as Able Seaman "Stripey" Wood
- Dora Bryan as Gladys Flanagan
- Hugh Williams as Captain David G. Wilson, Division Commander
- Robin Bailey as Lieutenant Michael Grant, ship's pilot
- Meredith Edwards as Jones, Chief Engineer
- John Forrest as Appleby
- Patric Doonan as Petty Officer Martin
- Sid James as Ned Hardy, owner of Golden Bull public house (as Sidney James)
- Tony Quinn as McConalog
- James Kenney as John A. Fraser, Hugh's son
- George Street as court member
- Hugh Hastings as crewman
- James Carney as Bone
- Harold Siddons as ship's doctor
- Harold Ayer as Lt. Cmdr. Carson
- Charles Lloyd-Pack as member of Board of Inquiry (as Charles Lloyd Pack)
- Peter Bathurst as member of Board of Inquiry
- William Russell as crewman (as Russell Enoch)
- Anthony Oliver as Ship's Officer, Guns
- Joan Rice as June Mallory, WRNS cypher officer
- Glyn Houston as Morgan, engine room artificer [uncredited]

== Production ==
The movie was meant to star Robert Stack but when he arrived in the UK he was refused a work permit and was replaced by James Donald. Part of the finance came from two rubber merchants, Colonels Weil and Prior.

The film was backed by James Lawrie and John Woolf. They formed a new company, Molton Films, to take the film over from Jay Lewis Productions as Jay Lewis refused to allow director Compton Bennett to work unhindered while filming.

The real-life ship used in the film was HMS Leamington. Built in 1919 as the USS Twiggs, a Wickes-class destroyer, she was one of the last post-war survivors of the 50 elderly four-funnelled destroyers provided in 1940 by the US as part of the "Destroyers for Bases Agreement": (also known as "The Fifty Ships that Saved the World"). She served on convoy duties, including as an escort for the ill-fated Convoy PQ 17. In 1943 she was transferred to the Royal Canadian Navy as HMCS Leamington. After a short period in reserve in 1944, she was one of seven sisters transferred to the Soviet Navy, and there became the Zguchij ("Firebrand"). Returned to the Royal Navy in 1950, the ship was listed for disposal in 1951, but before being broken up she was hired for the Gift Horse film. For the final scenes of the film, based on her sister-ship Campbeltown's daring St Nazaire Raid, her four funnels were reduced to two, and cut down at an angle to resemble the funnels of a German torpedo boat, just as Campbeltown's had been. She was finally broken up in December 1951.

The film was shot at Isleworth Studios in London with sets designed by the art director Edward Carrick.

== Reception ==
=== Box office ===
The film performed poorly at the US box office. It earned the producer receipts of £152,287.

=== Critical ===
The Monthly Film Bulletin wrote: "Throughout, it seems that the script has taken the line of least resistance in developing facile effects: the scene, for instance, in which Fraser learns of his son's death on Christmas Eve is altogether too obvious a sentimental set-piece. The mixture of action, lower deck comedy and sentiment has been directed by Compton Bennett with surface competence and accuracy, but without feeling or imagination. A concentration on the character of the captain, well played by Trevor Howard within the limitations imposed, might have proved more worth-while than this artificial chronicle of naval affairs."

Variety wrote: "Entire yarn is dominated by the male cast, and the few femme members provide only an incidental romantic touch. Howard gives a forceful performance as the skipper who refuses to allow personal tragedies (his son is killed in action on Christmas Day) to interfere with his over-riding task. Richard Attenborough has only a small part to play as a seaman but does it with his usual efficiency. ... Film has been directed by Compton Bennett with painstaking attention to detail. The three scripters have done a sound writing job and Harry Waxman's photography is in the top-grade."
