= Gwen Ffrangcon-Davies =

British actress and centenarian

Dame Gwen Ffrangcon-Davies DBE
- Gwen Ffrangcon-Davies, on 27 June 1928
- Born: Gwen Lucy Ffrangcon-Davies; 25 January 1891; London, England
- Died: 27 January 1992 (aged 101); Halstead, Essex, England
- Resting place: St Peter and St Thomas Churchyard, Stambourne, Essex, England
- Occupation: Actress
- Years active: 1911–1991
- Known for: Actress and centenarian

Dame Gwen Lucy Ffrangcon-Davies (25 January 1891 – 27 January 1992) was a British actress who worked mainly in theatre and television, as well as radio and film. She made her last acting appearance as a centenarian in 1991.

== Early life ==
She was born in London of a Welsh family; the name "Ffrangcon" is said to originate from a valley in Snowdonia. Her parents were opera baritone David Ffrangcon-Davies (né David Thomas Davies) and Annie Francis Rayner.

== Career ==
Ffrangcon-Davies made her stage debut in 1911, as a singer as well as an actress, and received encouragement in her career from Ellen Terry. In 1924, she played Juliet opposite John Gielgud as Romeo, and Gielgud was grateful to her for the rest of his life for the kindness she showed him, casting her as Queen Anne in Richard of Bordeaux in 1934. In 1925, Ffrangcon-Davies played Tess in a stage version of Tess of the d'Urbervilles, including a special presentation for its author, Thomas Hardy.

In 1938, Ffrangcon-Davies appeared with Ivor Novello in a production of Henry V at Drury Lane. Later the same year, she appeared as Mrs. Manningham in the first production of Gaslight by Patrick Hamilton. Ffrangcon-Davies played Lady Macbeth for almost an entire year in 1942 opposite John Gielgud's Macbeth.

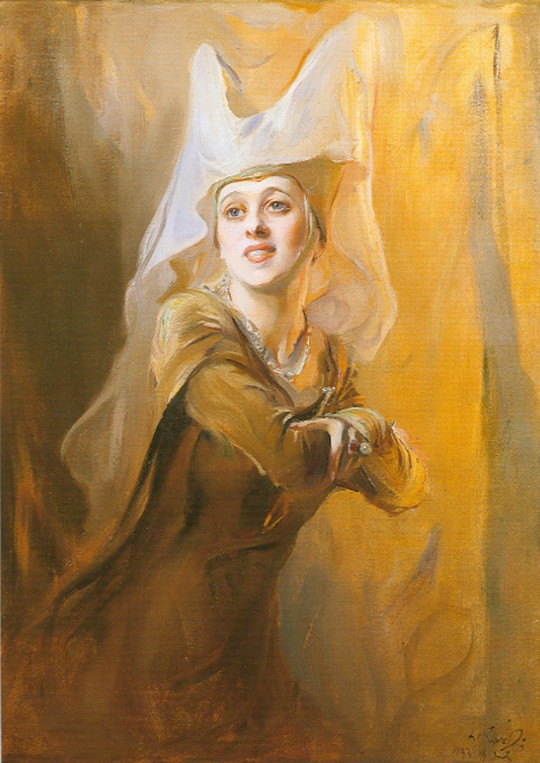
1933 portrait by Philip Alexius de László.

She won the Evening Standard Award in 1958 for her performance as Mary Tyrone in Long Day's Journey Into Night. She described the role as her favourite: "It's the most glorious part I've ever played. When you're young, you want to play Juliet. When you are old, this is the equivalent to Juliet. The mother I play is addicted to dope, and she keeps going back in time in her thinking. She becomes almost a child and it's a wonderful opportunity for an actress."

In 1960, Ffrangcon-Davies appeared at Toronto, Canada's Crest Theatre, performing in Long Day's Journey Into Night. The Crest only received permission to perform the play on condition Ffrangcon-Davies perform the role of the mother. She also presented an evening of poetry reading,and character studies of Shakespearean heroines Lady Macbeth, Catherine of Aragon, and Portia at the Crest. Her father had appeared in Toronto in 1900. Also in 1960, Ffrangcon-Davies - then in her late 60s - played Lady Macbeth in the Caedmon Records production of Macbeth opposite Anthony Quayle.

In 1963, Ffrangcon-Davies appeared in The School for Scandal with Gielgud, Ralph Richardson, Muriel Forbes, Richard Easton, and Laurence Naismith in London, which later toured in New York, and Toronto's O'Keefe Centre.

Ffrangcon-Davies retired from the stage in 1970, but continued to appear on radio and television; in one such appearance, broadcast on Christmas Day, 1990, a month before her 99th birthday, she featured in the BBC radio show, With Great Pleasure, in which stars chose favourite readings, spoken by others, and by themselves. She chose "The Kingdom of God", by Francis Thompson, read by Alec McCowen; a passage from The Merchant of Venice, read by herself, and Anna Massey and Alec McCowen; "These I Have Loved", by Rupert Brooke, read by Anna Massey; and, a part of the Seven Pillars of Wisdom, by T. E. Lawrence, whom she once met, read by Alec McCowen; it was included in the 1992 compilation cassette With Great Pleasure. In the 1980s, well into her nineties, she appeared on the Wogan chat show, in which she recited, word for word, the famous death scene of Juliet.

She made her final acting appearance as the Dowager in The Case-Book of Sherlock Holmes feature-length episode The Master Blackmailer at the age of 100. She was listed in The Guinness Book of Records under the category 'Oldest performer (UK)' for this role. Her films included The Witches (1966) and The Devil Rides Out (1968), both for Hammer Films.

== Personal life and death ==
Ffrangcon-Davies was created a Dame Commander of the Order of the British Empire in 1991, aged 100, and was the oldest-ever appointee to that honour until fellow actress Olivia de Havilland received her damehood in 2017. Ffrangcon-Davies died in 1992, two days after her 101st birthday, and a month after her final acting role was screened.

A lesbian, for many years her partner was South African actress Marda Vanne. She lived in the village of Stambourne, Essex, England.

Ffrangcon-Davies made two appearances on Desert Island Discs: one broadcast on 8 October 1962, and the other on 19 June 1988.

== Filmography ==
=== Movies ===
Year	Title	Role	Notes
1936	Tudor Rose	Mary Tudor	
1940	Busman's Honeymoon	Woman	Uncredited
1956	Paul Krüger	Queen Victoria	
1960	The Hill	Mary	Canadian TV movie
1966	The Witches	Granny Rigg	
1968	The Devil Rides Out	Countess	
1970	Leo the Last	Hilda	
1971	Speaking of Murder	Mrs. Walworth	TV movie

=== Television series ===
Year	Title	Role	Notes
1959–1967	ITV Play of the Week		six episodes
1960	BBC Sunday-Night Play		one episode
1961	Theatre Night		one episode
1964	Thursday Theatre		one episode
1965	Londoners	Dora Ashton	one episode
1967–1969	The Wednesday Play		two episodes
1968	Theatre 625		one episode
1969	Boy Meets Girl		one episode
1970	ITV Sunday Night Theatre	Miss Mybus	episode : 'The Policeman and the Cook'
1972	The Edwardians	Mrs. Olave Baden-Powell	episode : 'Baden-Powell'
1976	BBC Play of the Month	Lady Agatha	episode : 'The Picture of Dorian Gray'
1978	BBC2 Play of the Week		episode : 'Liza'
1982	BBC2 Playhouse		episode : 'Aubrey'
1992	The Case-Book of Sherlock Holmes	The Dowager	one episode
