= The Franchise Affair (film) =

- UK theatrical poster
- Directed by: Lawrence Huntington
- Written by: Robert Hall; Lawrence Huntington
- Based on: The Franchise Affair by Josephine Tey
- Produced by: Robert Hall
- Starring: Michael Denison; Dulcie Gray; Marjorie Fielding
- Cinematography: Günther Krampf
- Edited by: Clifford Boote
- Music by: Philip Green
- Production company: Associated British
- Distributed by: Associated British-Pathé
- Release date: 20 February 1951
- Running time: 95 minutes
- Country: United Kingdom
- Language: English
- Box office: £117,966 (UK)

The Franchise Affair is a 1951 British mystery thriller film directed by Lawrence Huntington and starring Michael Denison, Dulcie Gray, Anthony Nicholls and Marjorie Fielding. It was written by Robert Hall and Huntington from the 1948 novel The Franchise Affair by Josephine Tey.

== Plot ==
In a quiet English market town, 17-year-old schoolgirl Betty Kane claims that the owners of an isolated house ("The Franchise"), spinster Marion Sharpe and Marion's mother, kidnapped and beat her. The police believe Betty's story, but local lawyer Robert Blair, a bachelor, is sceptical. Risking ostracism from the community, Blair quietly sets about proving the innocence of the two women. The community begin to shun the women as they have already effectively been tried by the local press. Attacks on the house begin: breaking windows and painting graffiti on the walls. Local garage mechanics offer to help guard the house.

It eventually emerges that Betty was claiming to be 19 and was having an affair with a travelling salesman. She planned to explain her absence by a kidnap and chose "The Franchise" house, having seen it over the high wall from the top of a double decker bus, and hearing about the house and its occupants from a former employee, whom she easily manipulates and dominates.

Lawyer Blair asks Marion to marry him, but she declines and after the trial she and her mother go to fly away to Canada. However Robert is sitting in the seat behind her on the plane and surprises them both.

== Cast ==
- Michael Denison as Robert Blair
- Dulcie Gray as Marion Sharpe
- Anthony Nicholls as Kevin MacDermott
- Marjorie Fielding as Mrs Sharpe
- Athene Seyler as Aunt Lin
- John Bailey as Detective Inspector Grant
- Ann Stephens as Betty Kane
- Hy Hazell as Mrs Chadwick
- Kenneth More as Stanley Peters
- Avice Landone as Mrs Wynn
- Maureen Glynne as Rose Glynn
- Peter Jones as Bernard Chadwick
- Moultrie Kelsall as Judge
- Martin Boddey as Inspector Hallam
- Patrick Troughton as Bill Brough
- Hugh Moxey as Counsel for prosecution
- John Warwick as Carley
- Ernest Jay as Ramsden
- Everley Gregg as Mrs. Jarrett
- Ambrosine Phillpotts as Miss Spence
- Jean Anderson as Miss Tuff
- Harold Lang as bus inspector
- John Forrest as Leslis Wynn
- Lawrence Ray as Albert the waiter
- Victor Maddern as bus mechanic
- Doris York as Christina
- Will Ambro as Heseltine

== Production ==
It was shot at Elstree Studios with location shooting taking place around Chipping Campden in Gloucestershire which stood in for the fictional town of Melford. The film's sets were designed by the art director Terence Verity.

== Critical reception ==
The Monthly Film Bulletin wrote: "'The story is remotely based on the famous eighteenth century disappearance of Elizabeth Canning, and is a quite ingenious modernized version of this mystery. The script, adapted from a novel, tends to show its literary origins rather too clearly, particularly in dialogue, and is somewhat scrappily and haphazardly constructed. As a whole, the film needs more force and control both in direction and playing, but the material has sufficient interest to hold the attention to the end."

The New York Times wrote, "a great many words are spoken and a great deal of tea is consumed in a low-budget British picture, "The Franchise Affair," which made a bedraggled appearance at the Little Carnegie yesterday. And, as may be readily imagined, the sum total of it all is an hour and a half of sheer boredom, unrelieved by any action or surprise."

Sky Movies wrote, "a neat, well-constructed whodunit – or, rather, was-it-done? – graced by good performances – it was one of several films husband-and-wife team Michael Denison and Dulcie Gray made together – and a leisurely but literate script. Although modest in ambition, the film sustains its drama throughout and there are some fine moments of spicy, English upper-crust wit. Its courtroom scenes also bring a welcome relief from the Perry Mason style of histrionics. Star-spotters can't miss Kenneth More in a small role."

In The Radio Times Guide to Films David Parkinson gave the film 2/5 stars, writing: "The presence of postwar British cinema's golden couple, Michael Denison and Dulcie Gray, deprives this tale of superstition and recrimination of much of its suspense. As one of the women accused of kidnap and torture by the hysterical Ann Stephens, Gray fails to generate sufficient ambiguity, while lawyer Denison's decency lacks the indignation that might have injected some much-needed impetus."
