= The Laughing Woman (play) =

- Original language: English
- Written by: Gordon Daviot

Premiere
- Date: 1934
- Place: New Theatre, London

The Laughing Woman is a 1934 British stage play by Gordon Daviot, a nom de plume for Elisabeth MacKintosh (1896-1955) who also wrote under the name Josephine Tey. It was based on the relationship between Henri Gaudier and Sophie Brzeska.

The play debuted in London in 1934 at the New Theatre. It had a short run on Broadway in 1936.

== Premise ==
According to a synopsis in The Spectator, the "play... presents a cross-section of the relations between Rene Latour and Ingrid Rydrnan. He is young, French, and a sculptor; she is older, Swedish, and a philosopher with a book to write. They come from Paris to London and live there as brother and sister in great poverty. Their incessant quarrels cannot blind — or deafen — them to the fact that they are necessary to each other. They cling together stormily. The outbreak of the War finds Rene on the threshold of fame. He returns incontinently to the France which rejected him, to die (as the Epilogue tells us) on active service and with the rank of sergeant."

== Australian radio adaptation ==
The play was adapted for Australian radio in 1939 by Max Afford, starring Peter Finch and Neva Carr Glynn.

Finch's performance was a milestone in his career. A critic for Wireless Weekly stated:

Peter Finch is a great actor.... For the first time in my listening life, I was actually sorry when the play came to an end... As Rene Latour, Peter Finch is inspired. And Neva Carr-Glynn as Ingrid is not far behind... in the hands of the players it came to life — one of the most human, the most extraordinary, the most ruthless, the most delicate love stories that radio has been able to present.

The play was performed again on Australian radio in 1941 with Neva Carr Glynn and Paul O'Loughlin in the leads. Wireless Weekly said "It contains some of the most effective backyard squabbles I have heard in radio drama" but felt the accents were "not so good in parts. Perhaps Neva Carr-Glyn, who played Ingrid opposite Peter Finch in the first version, was a little bored with doing it again. Perhaps Paul O'Loughlin, who played the artist Latour, was a little self-conscious."

It was performed again in 1946, with Finch and Thelma Scott. Reviewing the 1946 production, the Sun said "Many actors make a hash of foreign characterisations. Not so Peter Finch. His Rene Latour in 2GB's "Laughing Woman" was a gem, matched only by Thelma Scott's sensitive performance as Ingrid Rydman. Both artists breathed life into an otherwise average play." Finch's performance earned him the Macquarie Award for Best Starring Male Actor of the year.

There was another version in 1953.
