= Josephine Tey =

Scottish author (1896–1952)

Elizabeth MacKintosh
- Born: Elizabeth MacKintosh; 25 July 1896; Inverness, Scotland
- Died: 13 February 1952 (aged 55); London, England
- Education: Inverness Royal Academy, Anstey Physical Training College
- Writing career
- Pen name: Josephine Tey, Gordon Daviot
- Genres: plays, novels
- Notable work: The Daughter of Time

Elizabeth MacKintosh (25 July 1896 – 13 February 1952), known by the pen name Josephine Tey, was a Scottish author. She is known for her Inspector Alan Grant series, which started with The Man in the Queue (1929). Her 1951 novel The Daughter of Time, from the same series, a detective work investigating the death of the Princes in the Tower, was chosen by the Crime Writers' Association in 1990 as the greatest crime novel of all time. Her first play Richard of Bordeaux, written under another pseudonym, Gordon Daviot, starred John Gielgud in its successful West End run.

== Life and work ==
MacKintosh was born on 25 July 1896 in Inverness, the eldest of three daughters of Colin MacKintosh, a fruiterer, and Josephine (née Horne). She attended Inverness Royal Academy and then, in 1914, Anstey Physical Training College in Erdington, a suburb of Birmingham. She taught physical training at various schools in England and Scotland and during her vacations worked at a convalescent home in Inverness as a Voluntary Aid Detachment nurse. A youthful romance ended with the death of her soldier friend in the Somme battles. In 1923, she returned to Inverness permanently to care for her invalid mother and stayed after her mother's death that year to keep house for her father.

The curriculum for "physical training" included much more than athletics. MacKintosh used her school experience in Miss Pym Disposes when describing the subjects taught at the school, and the types of bruises and other injuries sustained by the pupils. When she graduated, MacKintosh worked in a physiotherapy clinic in Leeds, then taught in schools, first in Nottinghamshire, then in Oban, where she was injured when a boom in the gymnasium fell on her face. MacKintosh repurposed this incident as a method of murder in Miss Pym Disposes.

While caring for her father, she began her career as a writer. Her first published work was in The Westminster Gazette in 1925, under the name Gordon Daviot. She continued publishing verse and short stories in The Westminster Review, The Glasgow Herald and the Literary Review.

Her first novel, Kif: An Unvarnished History, was well received at the time with good reviews, a sale to America, and a mention in The Observer's list of Books of the Week. This work was inspired by a detachment of the 4th Cameron Highlanders, a Scottish Territorial battalion stationed at Inverness before the First World War and prominent in the city's affairs. It was an early indication of MacKintosh's lasting interest in military matters. Three months later, her first mystery novel, The Man in the Queue, was published by Benn, Methuen. It was awarded the Dutton Mystery Prize when published in America. This is the first appearance of her detective, Inspector Alan Grant. It would be some years before she wrote another mystery.

MacKintosh's real ambition had been to write a play that would receive a run in London's West End. Her play about King Richard II, Richard of Bordeaux, was produced in 1932 at the Arts Theatre, under the Daviot pseudonym. Its success was such that it transferred to the New Theatre (now the Noël Coward Theatre) in 1933 for a year-long run. The production made a household name of its young leading man and director, John Gielgud, who became MacKintosh's life-long friend. MacKintosh wrote of Inspector Alan Grant that "he had in his youth seen Richard of Bordeaux; four times he had seen it". She stated that she was inspired by Gielgud's performance in Hamlet and by the Royal Tournament. Two more of her plays were produced at the New Theatre, The Laughing Woman (1934) and Queen of Scots (1934, written in collaboration with Gielgud).

MacKintosh wrote about a dozen one-act plays and another dozen full-length plays, many with biblical or historical themes, under the name of Gordon Daviot, but none received notable success. How she chose the name of Gordon is unknown, but Daviot was the name of a scenic locale near Inverness where she had spent many happy holidays with her family. Only four of her plays were produced during her lifetime.

MacKintosh's only non-fiction book, Claverhouse, was written as a vindication of John Graham, 1st Viscount Dundee (1648-1689), whom she regarded as a libelled hero: "It is strange that a man whose life was so simple in pattern and so forthright in spirit should have become a peg for every legend, bloody or brave, that belonged to his time."

MacKintosh's best-known books were written under the name of Josephine Tey, which was the name of her Suffolk great-great grandmother.

In five of the mystery novels, all of which except the first she wrote under the name of Tey, the hero is Scotland Yard Inspector Alan Grant. (Grant appears in a sixth, The Franchise Affair, as a minor character.) The best known of these is The Daughter of Time, in which Grant, laid up in hospital, has friends research reference books and contemporary documents so that he can puzzle out the mystery of whether King Richard III of England murdered his nephews, the Princes in the Tower.

The Franchise Affair also has a historical context: although set in the 1940s, it is based on the 18th-century case of Elizabeth Canning. The Daughter of Time was the last of MacKintosh's books published during her lifetime. Her last work, an additional crime novel, The Singing Sands, was found in her papers and published posthumously.

== Death ==
Tey was intensely private, shunning all publicity throughout her life. During her last year, when she knew that she was terminally ill, she resolutely avoided all her friends as well. Her ultimate work, The Privateer (1952), was a romantic novel based on the life of the privateer Henry Morgan. She died of liver cancer at her sister Mary's home in London on 13 February 1952. Most of her friends, including Gielgud, were unaware that she was even ill. Her obituary in The Times appeared under her real name: "Miss E. Mackintosh Author of 'Richard of Bordeaux'".

Proceeds from Tey's estate, including royalties from her books, were assigned to the National Trust.

== Reception and legacy ==
In 1990, The Daughter of Time was selected by the Crime Writers' Association as the greatest crime novel of all time; The Franchise Affair was 11th on the same list of 100 books.

In 2015, Val McDermid argued that Tey "cracked open the door" for later writers such as Patricia Highsmith and Ruth Rendell to explore the darker side of humanity, creating a bridge between the Golden Age of Detective Fiction and contemporary crime novels, because "Tey opened up the possibility of unconventional secrets. Homosexual desire, cross-dressing, sexual perversion – they were all hinted at, glimpsed in the shadows as a door closed or a curtain twitched. Tey was never vulgar nor titillating.... Nevertheless, her world revealed a different set of psychological motivations." In 2019, Evie Jeffrey discussed Tey's engagement with capital punishment debates in A Shilling for Candles and To Love and Be Wise.

== Publications ==
=== Novels ===
==== Inspector Alan Grant novels ====
All as Josephine Tey except where specified

1. The Man in the Queue (also published as Killer in the Crowd) (1929) [as Gordon Daviot]. Serialised, Dundee Evening Telegraph, 12 August to 24 September 1930.
2. A Shilling for Candles (1936) (the basis of Hitchcock's 1937 film Young and Innocent)
3. The Franchise Affair (1948) [Inspector Grant appears briefly at the beginning, mentioned a few times] (filmed in 1950 starring Michael Denison and Dulcie Gray)
4. To Love and Be Wise (1950)
5. The Daughter of Time (1951)
6. The Singing Sands (1952)

==== Stand-alone mysteries ====
All as Josephine Tey. These novels are set in the same fictional 20th-century Britain as the Inspector Grant novels.

- Miss Pym Disposes (1946)
- Brat Farrar (or Come and Kill Me) (1949) (the basis, without on-screen credit, for the 1963 Hammer production Paranoiac)

==== Other novels ====
All as Gordon Daviot

- Kif: An Unvarnished History (1929) – story of a boy who cares for horses and goes through WW1.
- The Expensive Halo: A Fable without Moral (1931) – about two pairs of brothers and sisters, one aristocratic, the other working class.
- The Privateer (1952) – a fictionalized reconstruction of the life of the privateer Henry Morgan.

=== Biography ===
- Claverhouse (1937) [as Gordon Daviot] (a life of the 17th-century cavalry leader John Graham of Claverhouse, 1st Viscount Dundee)

=== Stage plays ===
All as Gordon Daviot except where specified

- Richard of Bordeaux (First performed, Arts Theatre Club, London, 1932)
- The Laughing Woman (New Theatre, London, 1934)
- Queen of Scots (New Theatre, Aberdeen, 1934)
- The Stars Bow Down (Published, 1939; first performed, Chatham House School, 1949)
- Kirk o'Field (First performed, Theatre Royal, Glasgow, 1940)
- Cornelia (First performed, Glasgow Citizens' Theatre, 1946) [as F. Craigie Howe]. Revived, 1963, as by Gordon Daviot
- The Little Dry Thorn (First performed, Glasgow Citizens' Theatre, 1946)
- Leith Sands (Published, 1946: No stage performance yet traced)
- Rahab (Published, 1946. First performed, Scottish Community Drama Association, 1947)
- The Mother of Masé (Published, 1946: No stage performance yet traced)
- Sara (Published, 1946: No stage performance yet traced)
- Mrs Fry has a Visitor (Published, 1946: No stage performance yet traced)
- Three Mrs Madderleys (Published, 1946: No stage performance yet traced)
- Clarion Call (Published, 1946. First performed, Rugeley Town Hall, 31 July 1947)
- Remember Cæsar (Published, 1946: No stage performance yet traced)
- Valerius (First performed, Saville Theatre, London, 1948)
- Barnharrow (First performed, Stirling Dramatic Club, 1949, One-act)
- The Balwhinnie Bomb (1949)
- Dickon (First performed, Salisbury Playhouse, 1955) - a sympathetic portrayal of Richard III

=== Radio plays ===
All as Gordon Daviot

- The Laughing Woman (Short version). BBC Home Service, 1 December 1940
- Leith Sands. BBC Home Service, 13 December 1941
- Queen of Scots (Adapted by the author). BBC Home Service, 6 December 1942
- The Three Mrs Madderleys. BBC Home Service, 14 June 1944
- Mrs Fry Has a Visitor. BBC Home Service, 6 December 1944
- Three Women. (Three playlets). BBC Home Service, 10 June 1945
- Remember Caesar. BBC Home Service, 4 January 1946
- The Stars Bow Down. BBC Home Service, 13 November 1948
- The Pen of My Aunt. BBC Home Service, 15 February 1950
- The Pomp of Mrs Pomfret. BBC Home Service, 23 October 1954

=== Television plays ===
All as Gordon Daviot

- Sweet Coz. BBC Television, 4 January 1955
- Lady Charing Is Cross. BBC Television, 8 January 1955
- The Staff Room. BBC Television, 1 May 1956
- Barnharrow. BBC Television, 1 May 1956

=== Short stories ===
All as Gordon Daviot

- Pat at Seven. Westminster Gazette, 24 July 1926
- Janet. Westminster Gazette, 2 October 1926
- Atalanta. Westminster Gazette, 9 March 1927
- Pat Wears His Second Best Kilt. Westminster Gazette, 17 December 1927

=== Poems ===
All as Gordon Daviot

- A Song of Racing. Westminster Gazette, 16 April 1927
- Exile. Westminster Gazette, 7 May 1927
- Deadlock. Westminster Gazette, 21 May 1927
- A Song of Stations. Westminster Gazette, 4 June 1927
- Roads. Westminster Gazette, 20 August 1927
- In Memoriam HPFM. Westminster Gazette, 10 September 1927
- Dyspepsia. Westminster Gazette, 15 October 1927
- Reasons. Westminster Gazette, 24 December 1927
- When I Am Old. Westminster Gazette, 7 January 1928

=== Short non-fiction ===
All as Gordon Daviot

- Tossing the Caber. Westminster Gazette, 10 September 1927

== Radio and television dramatisations ==
- The Man in the Queue: broadcast in 1955, adapted by H.B. Fortuin
- A Shilling For Candles: broadcast in 1954, 1963 and 1969, adapted by Rex Rienits; in 1998, adapted by John Fletcher
- Miss Pym Disposes: broadcast in 1952, adapted by Jonquil Antony; and 1987, adapted by Elizabeth Proud
- The Franchise Affair: broadcast in 1952, 1970 and 2005
- The Franchise Affair: televised in 1958 (Robert Hall), serials 1962 (Constance Cox) and 1988 (James Andrew Hall)
- Brat Farrar: broadcast in 1954, 1959 and 1980 (all adapted by Cyril Wentzel)
- Brat Farrar: televised in 1986, adapted by James Andrew Hall
- The Daughter of Time: broadcast in 1952 (scriptwriter not credited) and 1982 (Neville Teller)
- The Singing Sands: broadcast in 1956 (Bertram Parnaby); televised in 1969 (James MacTaggart)
