= The Franchise Affair (novel) =

1948 mystery novel by Josephine Tey

- 1948 first edition cover
- Author: Josephine Tey
- Language: English
- Series: Inspector Alan Grant
- Genre: Mystery novel
- Publisher: Peter Davies
- Publication date: 1948
- Media type: Print book (Hardback & Paperback)
- Preceded by: A Shilling for Candles
- Followed by: To Love and Be Wise

The Franchise Affair is a 1948 British mystery novel by Josephine Tey about the investigation of a mother and daughter accused of kidnapping a young woman visiting their area. It was published in the UK by Peter Davies Ltd in 1948 and in the US by The Macmillan Company in 1949. While the book has maintained its reputation among readers of British genre fiction, and has often been adapted to other media, its social attitudes have been heavily criticised by more modern commentators.

== Plot ==
Robert Blair, a solicitor living in the country town of Milford, is called on to defend Marion Sharpe and her mother, who are accused of kidnapping and beating a fifteen-year-old war orphan named Betty Kane. The novel opens with the Sharpes about to be interviewed by local police. Marion has telephoned Blair, who agrees to come out to The Franchise, their isolated home on the edge of town, during the questioning.

Betty's account is that during the Easter holidays she went to stay with her aunt and uncle, the Tilsits, near Larborough. After a week, she wrote to her adoptive parents, the Wynns, to say she was enjoying herself and would spend another three weeks with the Tilsits. Then one evening, waiting for a bus, the Sharpe women offered her a lift. They took her to The Franchise, demanded that she become a domestic worker and, upon her refusal, imprisoned her in the attic. Betty alleges that they starved and beat her until she escaped.

When Blair meets Marion and Mrs. Sharpe, who are sensible and forthright and deny that the girl was ever in the house, he believes them and distrusts Betty. Yet Betty does have bruises from a beating, and she describes items and rooms inside The Franchise accurately.

Later in the week, the tabloid Ack-Emma, described as "run on the principle that two thousand pounds for damages is a cheap price to pay for sales worth half a million", features a long story from Betty's side, based on an interview with her vengeful brother, Leslie. This turns the townspeople of Milford against the Sharpes. One exception is Stanley Peters, a local car mechanic and friend of Blair, who says that Betty reminds him of an ex-girlfriend who was promiscuous and deceitful.

As interest in the case builds, locals engage in overt hostility against the Sharpes that culminates in The Franchise being destroyed by arson. Meanwhile, Stanley has become a friend and ally, serving as a night guard for them along with his co-worker Bill, and then providing them shelter when their home is burned down.

Blair is assisted in his search for clues against Betty Kane by his cousin, Nevil Bennet, who also works at the law firm, and his friend Kevin Macdermott, a flamboyant London barrister. Nevil's engagement to a local clergyman's daughter ends due to her belief in the Sharpes' guilt.

The clues that the investigators chiefly uncover are in the manner of character evidence. For example, Betty has an eidetic memory. When she returns home after the alleged kidnapping, the only item she has with her is lipstick. She does not tell the Wynns about her abduction right away, but in various details over a few days. Betty's mother was promiscuous, "a bad mother and a bad wife", according to a neighbour. Mrs. Tilsit, the aunt, tells Blair how Betty spent most of her holiday time, not with her aunt and uncle but in unsupervised freedom.

Betty had befriended a teenage girl who had once worked for the Sharpes as a cleaner, whom Betty had bullied. She is described by a couple of people as demure and looking as though "butter wouldn't melt in her mouth"; one of them, a restaurant waiter, tells Blair that Betty came in for tea several times, looking wholesome: "And then one day she picked up the man at the next table. You could have knocked me over with a feather."

Robert Blair, a lifelong bachelor living with his Aunt Lin, becomes strongly attracted to Marion Sharpe, with her gypsy looks and colourful scarves. But Marion is determined to remain single and stay close to her sharp-tongued mother. Nevil, although engaged, also finds Marion attractive; an aspiring poet, he describes her as "all compact of fire and metal. ... People don't marry women like Marion Sharpe, any more than they marry winds and clouds. Any more than they marry Joan of Arc."

The suspense of the Sharpes' guilt or innocence is maintained to the very end, with detailed investigative work proving that Betty had been abroad at the time with a married man only paying off in a satisfactory fashion at the trial.

== Inspiration ==
Although given a contemporary (post-Second World War) setting, the story was inspired by the 18th-century case of Elizabeth Canning, a maidservant who claimed she had been kidnapped and held prisoner for a month. It is most probably based on a reading of Arthur Machen's non-fiction account of the case The Canning Wonder (1925) as the plot follows a similar line to Machen's thinking.

== Adaptations ==
The novel was adapted for the film The Franchise Affair, made by the Associated British Picture Corporation in 1951.

It has also been adapted twice for television: in 1962 by Constance Cox in six episodes for BBC TV; and in 1988 in a six-episode series for BBC One by James Andrew Hall.

Earlier it had been adapted by Kenneth Owen for the BBC Home Service's Saturday Night Theatre and first broadcast in 1952. Also a ten-episode abridgement of the novel was read on BBC Radio 4's "Story Time" in 1976, on "Book at Bedtime" in 1980 and "Woman's Hour" in 1991.

The novel was adapted for Australian radio in serial form in 1954 directed by Max Afford. This was performed again in 1962.

== Reception ==
Despite being listed by the UK Crime Writers' Association as one of The Top 100 Crime Novels of All Time in 1990, and by the Mystery Writers of America as among The Top 100 Mystery Novels of All Time in 1995, there have been many dissentient views as well. In the year of its publication, for example, Kirkus Reviews dismissed the novel as "Dignified, disappointing, very British".

More recent studies have seen The Franchise Affair as a study in spiteful misogyny. The author Sarah Waters is offended by its outmoded, class-based values and contrasts the mid-18th century narrative on which it is based, the mysterious Canning case, with the immediately post-war implosion of the upper middle class in Tey's story and its total lack of compassionate understanding of the war-orphaned Betty Kane's behavioural experimentation. In Charlotte Beyer's feminist reading, the story demonstrates the period's blatantly unfair defence of authoritarian male prejudice in which the final shaming of an adolescent girl's sexuality during the court proceedings has more to do with privileged and outmoded attitudes than any concept of justice.
